= Background of the occupation of the Baltic states =

The background of the occupation of the Baltic states covers the period before the first Soviet occupation on 14 June 1940, stretching from independence in 1918 to the Soviet ultimatums in 1939–1940. Estonia, Latvia, and Lithuania gained independence in the aftermath of the Russian revolutions of 1917 and the German occupation, which in the Baltic countries lasted until the end of World War I in November 1918. All three countries signed non-aggression treaties with the Soviet Union in the 1920s and 1930s. Despite the treaties, in the aftermath of the 1939 German–Soviet pact, Estonia, Latvia, and Lithuania were occupied, and thereafter forcibly incorporated, into the Soviet Union in 1940.

== Independence process ==
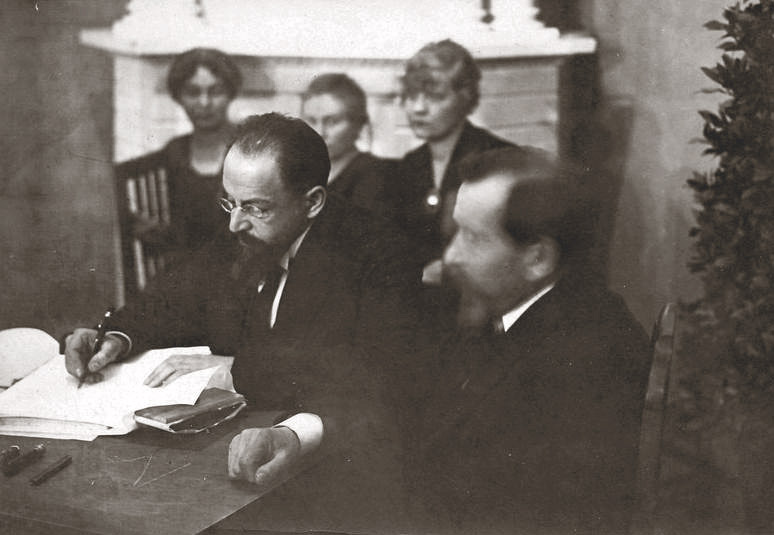
Signing the Treaty of Tartu. Adolf Joffe (Soviet Russia, left).

The Russian Empire acquired the Baltic areas as autonomous Duchies administered by Baltic German nobility via the Treaty of Nystad in 1721 and Courland in 1795. In 1914, World War I broke out and by 1915, German armies had occupied Lithuania and Courland, incorporating the areas into Ober Ost. As the Russian Empire began to collapse, independence movements sprung up on many regions. After the 1917 October Revolution in Russia, Baltic political leaders attempted to establish the independent states of Estonia, Latvia and Lithuania; however, German control continued throughout the area until early 1918. Later in 1918, the area was drawn into the Russian Civil War and proclamations of independence were issued in Lithuania on 16 February, in Estonia on 24 February, and in Latvia on 18 November 1918.

Between the years of 1918–1920, the bolsheviks tried to establish Soviet republics in the Baltic area. In November 1918, the Red Army conquered Narva. They proclaimed the Commune of the Working People of Estonia, but it was able to function only for six weeks. In December, the Latvian communists controlled Riga and proclaimed the Latvian Socialist Soviet Republic. In May 1919, the communist control ended when the city was taken by combined German, Latvian, and White Russian troops.

By 1920, German troops had withdrawn and the Russian Civil War was in its final phase. Consequently, the Baltic states signed peace treaties with Soviet Russia. Estonia signed the Treaty of Tartu on 2 February, Lithuania signed the Soviet–Lithuanian Peace Treaty on 12 July, and Latvia signed the Latvian–Soviet Peace Treaty on 15 August 1920. In 1920, all three Baltic states adopted constitutions including universal suffrage, a multi-party system, and parliamentary with a president. However, the communists were prohibited from participation in politics.

== Diplomacy in the 1920s and early 1930s ==
=== Baltic states seek security guarantees ===
The Bolsheviks could not prevent the independence of the Baltic states, but the West had to be persuaded to accept it. By 1921, Lithuania, and by 1922, Estonia and Latvia, all obtained de jure international recognition. All three states joined the League of Nations in 1921. The Baltic states begin to build a regional alliance system with their neighbours in Scandinavia and eastern Europe. In the south, Poland was reconstituted with consolidation of territories from Germany and Russia. Furthermore, in summer 1920, Lithuania cooperated with the Bolsheviks trying to seize Vilnius, which poisoned Lithuanian relations with their neighbours. In the north, Finland had also been under Russian control from 1809 until its independence in 1918, but the Finns looked to Scandinavia rather than towards the Baltic states. In the west, Sweden followed a policy of neutrality, but during the 1920s, it took a more active regional role.

Between 1917 and 1934, the Baltic states worked to improve security, and unsuccessfully attempted to build a regional bloc stretching from Scandinavia to Romania. The Estonians and Latvians concluded a military convention in 1923, which Lithuania joined in 1934. Further, the Estonians and Latvians held a joint military exercise in 1931, but it was not repeated, and collaboration remained a dead letter thereafter. However, the Finns and the Estonians had secret military exercises in the early 1930s, reconstructing the tsarist naval batteries. Finally, in 1934, the three Baltic states reached the Baltic Entente agreement.

In spite of the Vilnius issue, the Baltic states were open to the Polish option. The Warsaw Accord was signed in March 1922 by Finland, Poland, Estonia, and Latvia, but the Finnish parliament failed to ratify it.

=== German–Soviet trade and non-aggression agreements ===
The April 1922 Genoa Conference between Germany, the Soviet Union, and the Allied powers was an attempt to reconstruct Europe. Soon, the Germans and the Soviets agreed on the Rapallo Treaty, which provided mutual liquidation of war debts and the recognition of the Soviet state. It was also the beginning of the direct economic co-operation between these two giants. The Baltic leaders had lost their chance of planned international consortium to trade with the Soviets. Next, the Locarno Conference in 1925 gave a framework for European security. The Locarno treaties guaranteed Germany's western borders, but left open questions about Germany's eastern borders. The Germans and Soviets agreed to the Treaty of Berlin in 1926, as the Soviets feared the West could use Germany in its anti-Bolshevik crusade. The Baltic states were warned to not become military outposts of Great Britain against the Soviet Union.

Germany developed a positive relationship with the Baltic states, especially with Latvia. Latvia represented itself as a bridge to an improved relationship with the Soviet Union. Latvia managed to sign a trade agreement with Germany in 1926 and with the Soviet Union in 1927. Similarly, Lithuania signed a trade agreement with Germany in May 1926. Lithuania was the key to improved relationship with the Soviet Union. In exchange for Soviet recognition of Lithuania's claim to Vilnius, the countries signed a non-aggression pact in September 1926.

The situation appeared to be stable for the Baltic states. The Soviet Union was not a significant threat as Joseph Stalin's rise to power was underway, and the state retreated to the Socialism in one country ideology. The Soviets signed non-aggression treaties with their neighbor states between 1926 and 1933, including Finland, Latvia, Estonia, and Poland.

== Europe becomes unstable ==
=== Rise of totalitarian regimes ===
The early 1930s saw instability in the international community; first, the stock markets collapsed in 1929, causing an economic slump. Second, economic woes and fear of Communism saw the rise of totalitarian regimes in Japan, Germany, and Italy. Economic crises destabilized the internal politics of the Baltic states, causing the rise of authoritarian regimes. Antanas Smetona and Augustinas Voldemaras had already taken power in Lithuania in a coup d'état in 1926; both Estonia and Latvia followed their example in 1934. The Elder of State Konstantin Päts took power in Estonia, and shortly afterward, Prime Minister Kārlis Ulmanis took power in Latvia. Furthermore, because of the Great Depression, the Baltic states' two leading trading partners, Britain and Germany, limited their imports from the Baltic region.

Adolf Hitler's rise to power in Germany increased Soviet fears, and made the Baltic position between these two giants difficult. The Germans responded to the banking crisis of 1931 by introducing the policy of Grossraum wirtschaft. It was a clearing agreement where states exchanged material goods instead of money. This increased German trade with the Baltic states and it integrated their economy with Germany, but it never dominated their trade as effectively as in the Balkans. In January 1934, the Germans and the Poles signed a non-aggression pact.

In March 1934, the Soviet commissar for foreign affairs Maxim Litvinov proposed to the German ambassador in Moscow Rudolf Nadolny, a German-Soviet guarantee for the Baltic states which were "previously a part of the former Russian empire". Hitler vetoed the proposed deal and Nadolny resigned. Next, the Soviets turned to the "Eastern Locarno" plan, which was originally proposed by French foreign minister Louis Barthou. The proposed plan would have allowed Soviet troops to enter the Baltic states in the name of mutual assistance. External threats led to the Baltic Entente of September 1934, in which the Baltic states concluded a collective foreign policy, though it had no formal military provisions.

=== Road to Nazi–Soviet co-operation ===
Germany increased the scope of its power and authority with the Anglo-German Naval Agreement in 1935 and the remilitarization of the Rhineland in 1936. In response, Baltic chiefs of staff were invited to the May Day celebration in Moscow in 1936. During their visit, an Estonian officer was warned about German influence and offered a military alliance with the Soviet Union. Leningrad Bolshevik party leader Andrei Zhdanov made a speech to the eighth Soviet congress in November 1936, in which he warned border states against acting on behalf of the fascist powers and hinted at an intervention by the Red Army on the other side of the border.

Next, Germany annexed Austria in March 1938. A few days after this, Poland delivered an ultimatum, demanding that Lithuania sign a peace treaty with Poland. Without support from their Baltic neighbours, the Lithuanians had to accede to the ultimatum. In September, the Germans occupied Czechoslovakia. Next, the Germans aimed to regain the Polish Corridor and Klaipėda in Lithuania. On 20 March 1939, the Germans demanded Klaipėda from Lithuania. Two days later, the Lithuanians agreed, losing 30 percent of their industrial capacity and their only major sea port. The dismemberment of Czechoslovakia caused France and Great Britain to guarantee Polish integrity on 30 March.

Planned and actual divisions of Europe, according to the Molotov–Ribbentrop Pact, with later adjustments

The Soviet Union remained conciliatory with Baltic states in 1937–1938. Moscow had welcomed the Baltic Entente earlier and Soviet marshal Alexander Yegorov visited all three Baltic capitals in 1937. However, during the same period, the Soviet Union built defences on the borders of Finland, Estonia, and Latvia, and committed airspace infringements. In early 1939, the Germans and Soviets started secret meetings toward an agreement. The British had abandoned the idea of naval intervention in the Baltic with the Anglo-German Naval Agreement in 1935. However, British politicians made visits to the area, and exported armaments. In 1939, the British and French tried to arrange a "guarantee" of the Baltic states to the Soviet Union. The Baltic states would have preferred to remain neutral, but the only security systems on offer were German or Soviet. In June 1939, Estonia and Latvia yielded to German pressure and signed non-aggression pacts.

In late June, the German general Franz Halder visited Estonia and Finland, and later, Admiral Wilhelm Canaris visited Estonia. The visits were merely political demonstration, but the Soviets saw them as unfriendly. Germany and the West raced for Soviet favours. The French were prepared to hand over the Baltic states to the Soviets in order to purchase an agreement but the British refused. The French and British went on to hold military conversations in Moscow in August 1939. The Soviets demanded that the Western powers occupy bases in Finland and the Baltic states and then hand them over to the Red Army. Soon afterward, German foreign minister Joachim von Ribbentrop traveled to Moscow to negotiate the final stage of a new pact, later known as the Molotov–Ribbentrop Pact. In its secret protocol, the Germans and Soviets divided Finland, Estonia, Latvia, Lithuania, Poland, and Bessarabia between their spheres of influence. After the German invasion of Poland on 1 September, a second secret protocol of 28 September consigned Lithuania to the Soviet sphere of interest.

== Soviet ultimatums and occupation ==
=== Soviets demand and establish military bases ===
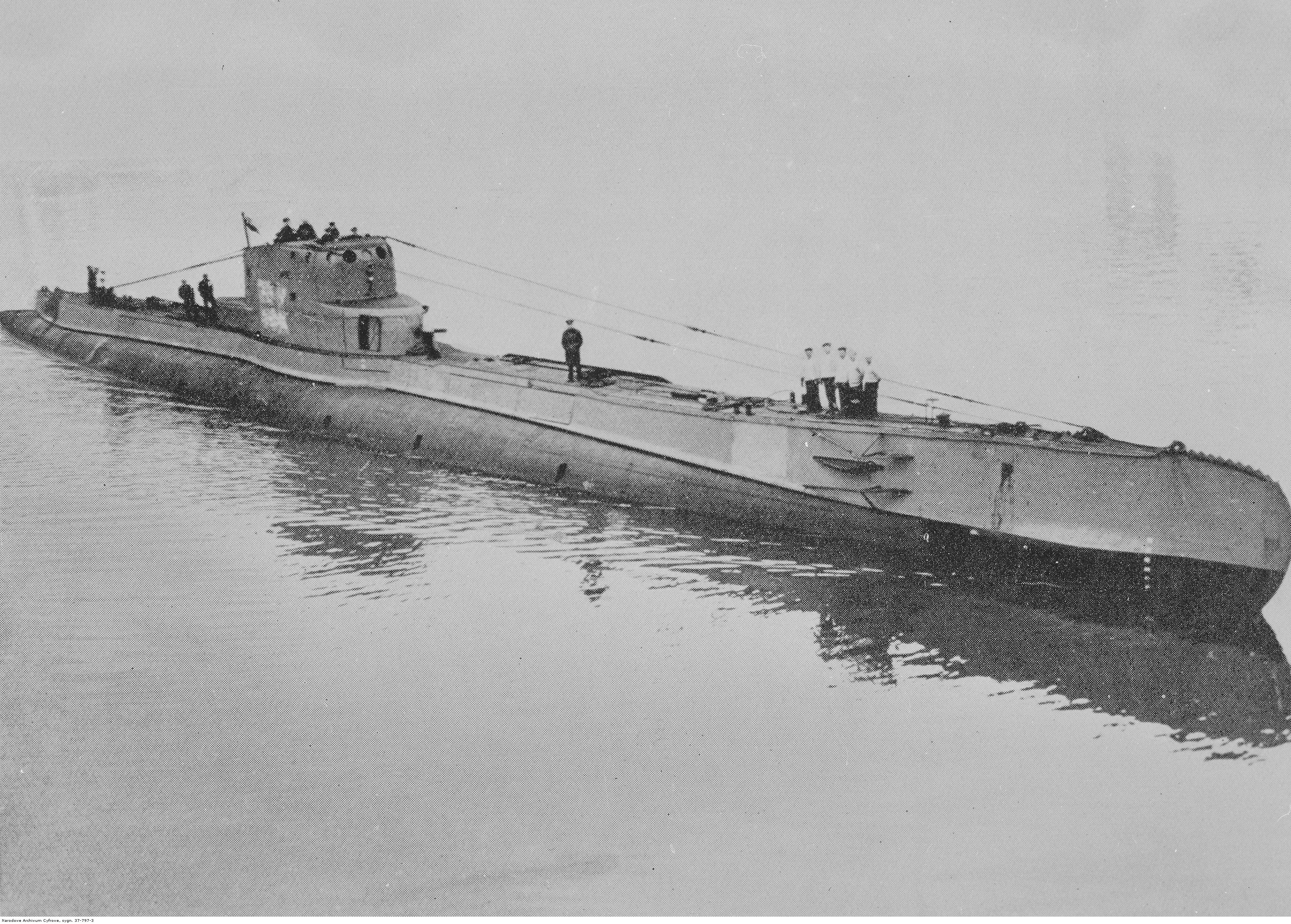
Polish submarine ORP Orzeł in Rosyth in early 1940.

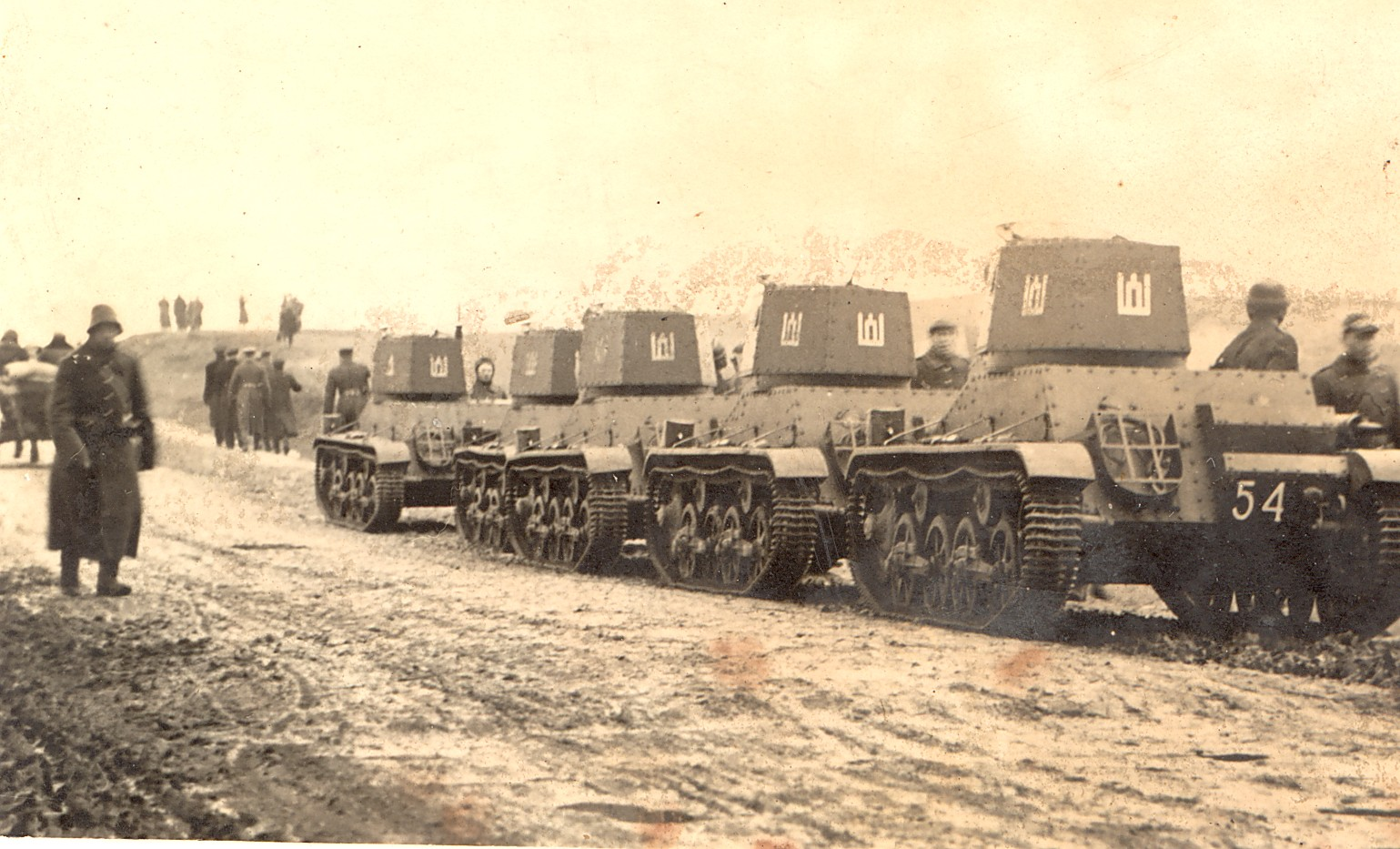
Lithuanian tanks heading to Vilnius in 1939 after the Soviet–Lithuanian Mutual Assistance Treaty.

On August 23, 1939, the Soviet Union asserted its control over the Baltic states with the Molotov–Ribbentrop Pact, which declared them as a Soviet sphere of influence. On September 16, the Soviets and Japanese governments signed a cease-fire agreement. Next, the Soviets invaded Poland on 17 September, concluding operations on 6 October. After occupying eastern Poland, the Soviets pressured Finland and the Baltic states to conclude mutual assistance treaties. The Soviets questioned the neutrality of Estonia following the escape of a Polish submarine on 18 September. A week later, on 24 September, the Estonian foreign minister Karl Selter was given an ultimatum in Moscow. The Soviets demanded the conclusion of a treaty of mutual assistance which included the establishment of military bases in Estonia.

In early 1939, the Leningrad Military District had already allocated 17 divisions, about 10% of the Soviet Army, to the Baltic states. Mobilizations followed shortly. The 8th Army was dispatched to Pskov on 14 September 1939, and the mobilized 7th Army placed under the Leningrad Military District. Invasion preparations were by now nearing completion. On 26 September, the Leningrad Military District was ordered to "start concentrating troops on the Estonian-Latvian border and to finish that operation on 29 September." The order noted, "for the time of starting the attack a separate directive will be issued." On 24 September, warships of the Soviet Navy appeared off Estonian ports and Soviet bombers began threatening patrols over Tallinn and the nearby countryside. The USSR then entered the airspace of all three Baltic states, flying massive intelligence gathering operations on 25 September.

After four days of negotiations, the Estonians had no choice but to accept naval, air, and army bases on two Estonian islands and at the port of Paldiski. Soviet troop numbers in Estonia were put at 25,000. The mutual assistance treaty was signed on 28 September and the Soviets made similar treaties with Latvia on 5 October and Lithuania on 10 October. The latter treaty transferred the Vilnius district to Lithuania. Finland was invited to enter similar negotiations on 5 October. Unlike the Baltics, the Finnish–Soviet negotiations lasted weeks without result. The Soviets invaded Finland on 30 November. The Finns were able to resist the Soviets for over three months and prevented them from annexing Finland. In the ensuing Moscow Peace Treaty, Finland ceded 9% of its territory to the USSR.

=== Occupation and annexation ===
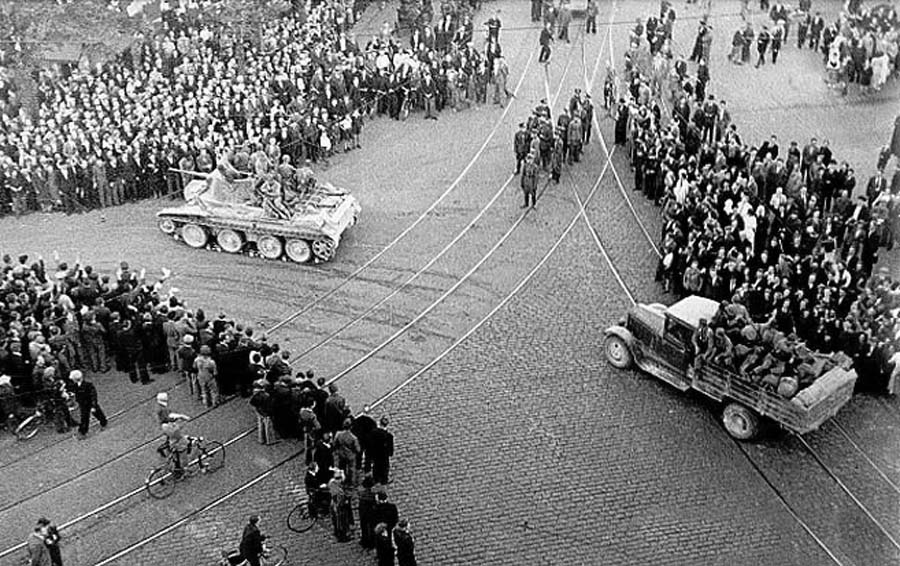
Soviet Tanks in center of Riga, 1940

In December 1939, Latvian communists were called to consultation in Moscow. Their activities included, among others, collecting information on those who held opinions hostile to the Soviets. In May 1940, the Soviets turned to the idea of direct military intervention, but still intended to use a puppet regime. Their model was the Finnish Democratic Republic, a puppet regime set up by the Soviets on the first day of the Winter War. The Soviets organised a press campaign against the allegedly pro-Allied sympathies of the Baltic governments. In May, the Germans invaded France; the country was overrun and occupied a month later. In late May and early June, the Baltic states were accused of military collaboration against the Soviet Union. On 15 June, the Lithuanian government had no choice but to agree to the Soviet ultimatum and permit the entry of an unspecified number of Soviet troops. Prime minister Antanas Smetona proposed armed resistance to the Soviets, but the government refused, proposing their own candidate to lead the regime. However, the Soviets refused and sent Vladimir Dekanozov to take charge of affairs while the Red Army occupied the state.

On 16 June, Latvia and Estonia also received ultimatums. The Red Army occupied the two remaining Baltic states shortly thereafter. The Soviets installed Andrey Vyshinsky as leader of Latvia and Andrei Zhdanov in Estonia. New Baltic state governments were formed on 18 and 21 June along popular front lines. They were confirmed in office by rigged elections on 14–15 July. A few days afterward, on 18 July, "demonstrators" in major Baltic cities called for incorporation into the Soviet Union. Three days later, all three parliaments declared their states to be Soviet republics and applied for membership. Lithuania was incorporated into the Soviet Union on 3 August, Latvia on 5 August, and Estonia on 9 August.

== See also ==
- Background of the Winter War
- Western betrayal
