= Soviet occupation of the Baltic states (1940) =

- Part of World War II, the occupation of the Baltic states and military occupations by the Soviet Union
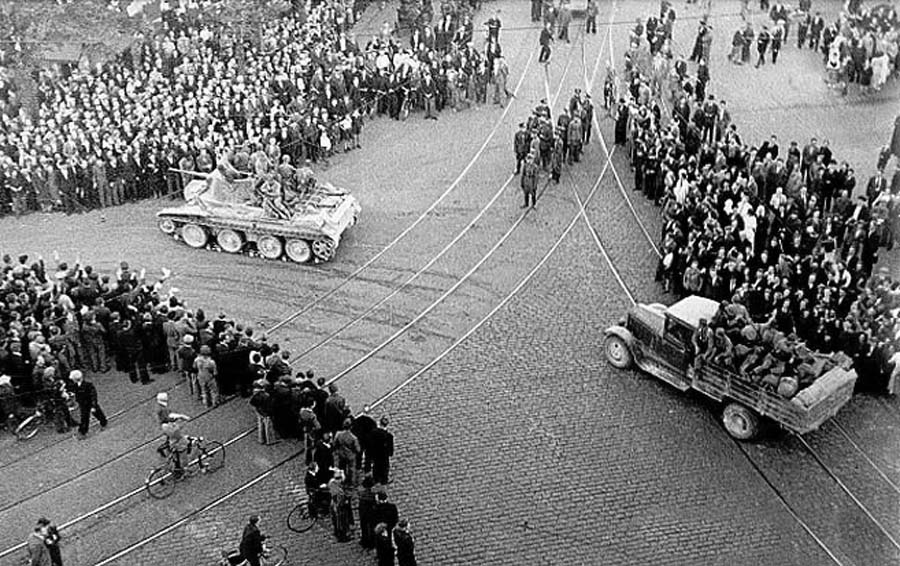
- Soviet troops in Riga, Latvia (1940)
Date	15 June – 6 August 1940
Location	Baltic states (Estonia, Latvia, and Lithuania)
Result	Soviet victory: Soviet troops militarily occupy the Baltic states; Baltic governments deposed; Rigged elections produce communist governments under Soviet control, which request admission to the USSR; Baltic states annexed de facto as republics of the Soviet Union, not widely recognized by the outside world; Beginning of partisan resistance to Soviet rule

Belligerents
Estonia Latvia Lithuania	Soviet Union (Estonian Soviet Socialist Republic) Estonian Communist Party (Latvian Soviet Socialist Republic) Latvian Communist Party (Lithuanian Soviet Socialist Republic) Lithuanian Communist Party; Diplomatic support: Germany

Commanders and leaders
(Estonia) Konstantin Päts (Estonia) Jüri Uluots (Estonia) Nikolai Reek (executed) (Estonia) Johan Laidoner (Latvia) Kārlis Ulmanis (Latvia) Krišjānis Berķis (Latvia) Jānis Balodis (Lithuania) Antanas Smetona (Lithuania) Antanas Merkys	(Soviet Union) Joseph Stalin (Soviet Union) Vyacheslav Molotov (Soviet Union) Semyon Timoshenko (Soviet Union) Aleksandr Loktionov (Soviet Union) Andrey Vyshinsky (Estonian Soviet Socialist Republic) Johannes Vares (Estonian Soviet Socialist Republic) Karl Säre (Latvian Soviet Socialist Republic) Augusts Kirhenšteins (Latvian Soviet Socialist Republic) Jānis Kalnbērziņš (Lithuanian Soviet Socialist Republic) Justas Paleckis (Lithuanian Soviet Socialist Republic) Antanas Sniečkus

The Soviet occupation of the Baltic states covers the period from the Soviet–Baltic mutual assistance pacts in 1939, to their invasion and annexation in 1940, to the mass deportations of 1941.

In September and October 1939 the Soviet government compelled the much smaller Baltic states to conclude mutual assistance pacts which gave the Soviets the right to establish military bases there. Following invasion by the Red Army in the summer of 1940, Soviet authorities compelled the Baltic governments to resign. The presidents of Estonia and Latvia were imprisoned and later died in Siberia. Under Soviet supervision, new puppet communist governments and fellow travelers arranged rigged elections with falsified results. Shortly thereafter, the newly elected "people's assemblies" passed resolutions requesting admission into the Soviet Union. In June 1941 the new Soviet governments carried out mass deportations of "enemies of the people". Consequently, at first many people in the Baltic states greeted the Germans as liberators when they occupied the area a week later.

== Background ==
Soviet expansion in 1939–1940

After the Soviet invasion of Poland on 17 September 1939, in accordance with the Molotov–Ribbentrop Pact the Soviet forces were given freedom over Estonia, Latvia, and Lithuania, an important aspect of the agreement to the Soviet government as they were afraid of Germany using the three states as a corridor to get close to Leningrad. The Soviets pressured Finland and the Baltic states to conclude mutual assistance treaties. The Soviets questioned the neutrality of Estonia following the escape of a Polish submarine from Tallinn on 18 September. Six days later, on 24 September 1939, the Estonian foreign minister was given an ultimatum in Moscow. The Soviets demanded the conclusion of a treaty of mutual assistance to establish military bases in Estonia. The Estonians had no choice but to allow the establishment of Soviet naval, air and army bases on two Estonian islands and at the port of Paldiski. The corresponding agreement was signed on 28 September 1939. Latvia followed on 5 October 1939 and Lithuania shortly thereafter, on 10 October 1939. The agreements permitted the Soviet Union to establish military bases on the Baltic states' territory for the duration of the European war, and station 25,000 Soviet soldiers in Estonia, 30,000 in Latvia and 20,000 in Lithuania from October 1939.

The Soviets then turned their attention to Finland. The Soviets demanded that Finland cede or lease parts of its territory, as well as the destruction of Finnish defenses along the Karelian Isthmus. After the Finns rejected these demands, the Soviets responded with military force. The USSR launched the Winter War on 30 November 1939, with the goal of annexing Finland. Simultaneously, a puppet regime, called the Finnish Democratic Republic, was created by the Soviets to govern Finland after Soviet conquest. The initial period of the war proved disastrous for the Soviet military, taking severe losses while making little headway. On 29 January 1940, the Soviets put an end to their Finnish Democratic Republic puppet government and recognized the government in Helsinki as the legal government of Finland, informing it that they were willing to negotiate peace.

The Soviets reorganized their forces and launched a new offensive along the Karelian Isthmus in February 1940. As fighting in Viipuri raged and the hope of foreign intervention faded, the Finns accepted peace terms on 12 March 1940 with the signing of the Moscow Peace Treaty. Fighting ended the following day. The Finns had retained their independence, but ceded 9% of Finnish territory to the Soviet Union. While the Baltic states were officially neutral in the Winter War, with the Soviets praising their relations with the USSR as exemplary, Soviet bombers had used bases in Estonia for bombing Finland.

== Soviet occupation ==
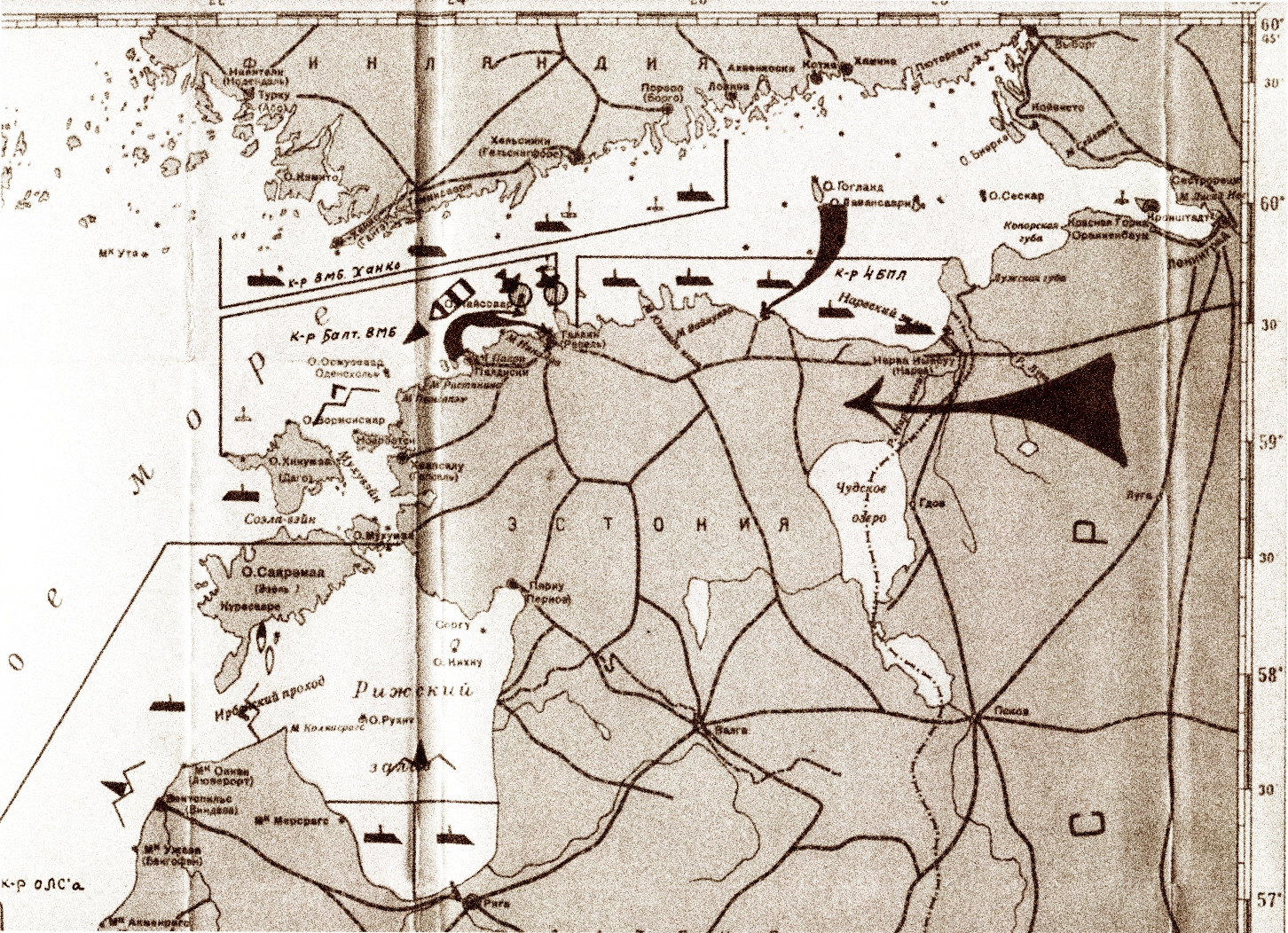
Schematics of the Soviet military blockade and invasion of Estonia and Latvia in 1940 (Russian State Naval Archives)

The Soviet troops allocated for possible military actions against the Baltic states numbered 435,000 troops, around 8,000 guns and mortars, over 3,000 tanks, and over 500 armoured cars. On 3 June 1940 all Soviet military forces based in Baltic states were concentrated under the command of Aleksandr Loktionov. On 9 June the directive 02622ss/ov was given to the Red Army's Leningrad Military District by Semyon Timoshenko to be ready by 12 June to a) capture the vessels of the Estonian, Latvian and Lithuanian navies in their bases or at sea; b) capture the Estonian and Latvian commercial fleets and all other vessels; c) prepare for an invasion and landing in Tallinn and Paldiski; d) close the Gulf of Riga and blockade the coasts of Estonia and Latvia in the Gulf of Finland and Baltic Sea; e) prevent an evacuation of the Estonian and Latvian governments, military forces and assets; f) provide naval support for an invasion towards Rakvere; and g) prevent Estonian and Latvian airplanes from flying either to Finland or Sweden.

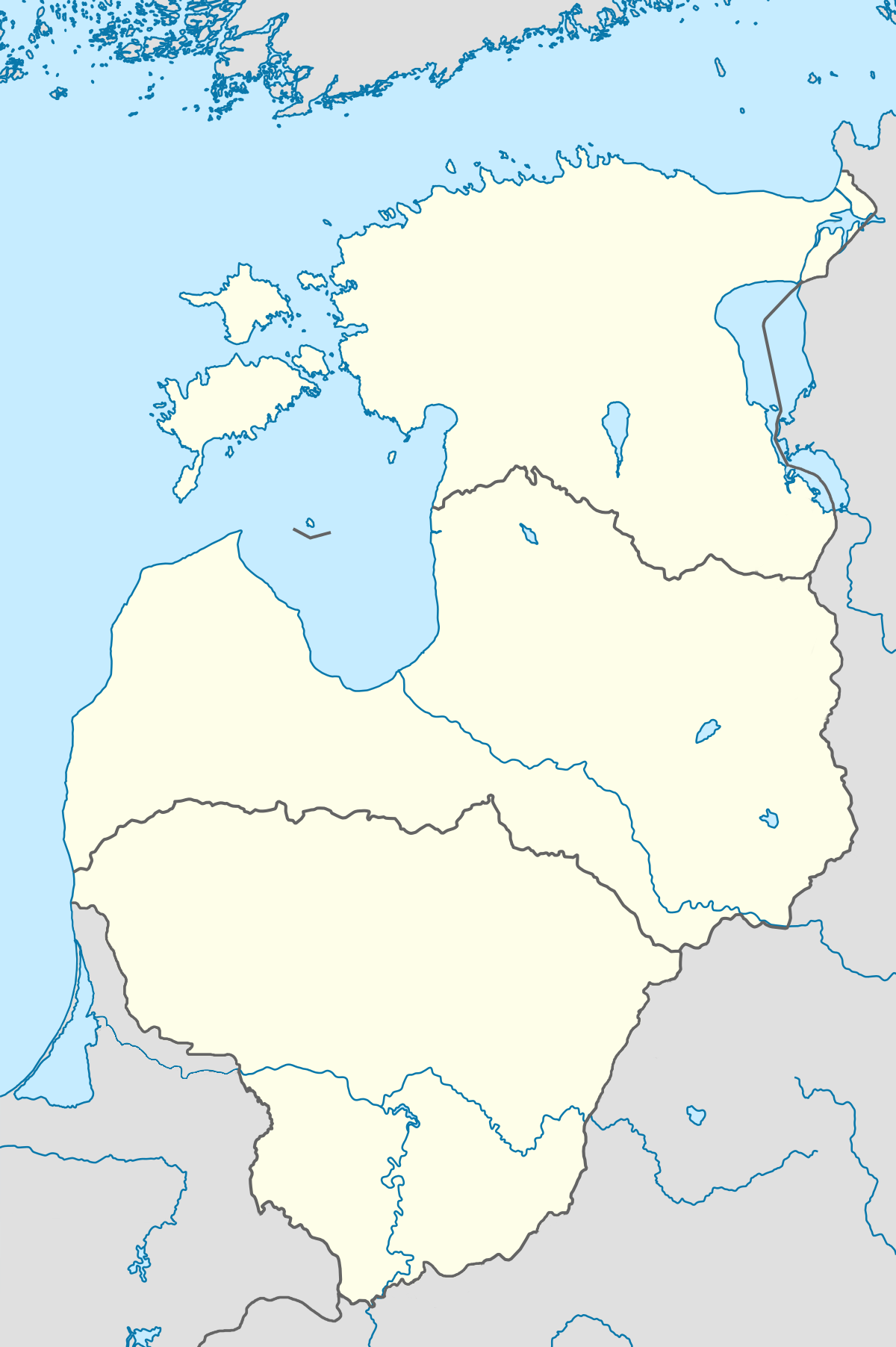
Baltic States right before the Soviet Invasion (1940)

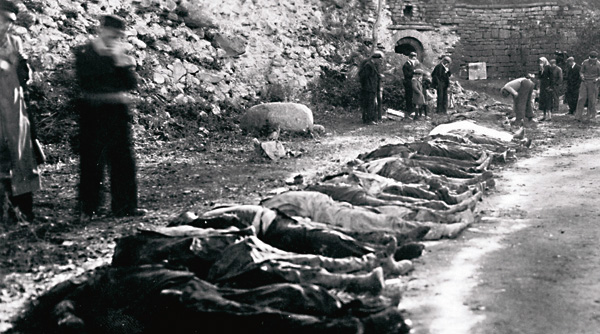
Soviet repressions in Kuressaare, Estonia (1941)

On 12 June 1940, according to the director of the Russian State Archive of the Naval Department Pavel Petrov (C.Phil.) referring to the records in the archive, the Soviet Baltic Fleet was ordered to implement a total military blockade of Estonia. On 13 June at 10:40 a.m. Soviet forces started to move to their positions and were ready by 14 June at 10 p.m. Four submarines and a number of light navy units were positioned in the Baltic Sea, in the Gulfs of Riga and Finland, to isolate the Baltic states by the sea. A navy squadron including three destroyer divisions was positioned to the west of Naissaar in order to support the invasion and the 1st Marine Brigade's four battalions were positioned on the transport ships Sibir, 2nd Pjatiletka and Elton for landings on the islands Naissaare and Aegna. The transport ship Dnester and destroyers Storozevoi and Silnoi were positioned with troops for the invasion of the capital Tallinn; the 50th battalion was positioned on ships for an invasion near Kunda. Participating in the naval blockade were 120 Soviet vessels, including one cruiser, seven destroyers, and seventeen submarines, along with 219 airplanes including the 8th air-brigade with 84 DB-3 and Tupolev SB bombers and the 10th brigade with 62 airplanes.

On 14 June 1940 the Soviets issued an ultimatum to Lithuania. The Soviet military blockade of Estonia went into effect while the world's attention was focused on the fall of Paris to Nazi Germany. Two Soviet bombers downed the Finnish passenger airplane Kaleva flying from Tallinn to Helsinki carrying three diplomatic pouches from the U.S. legations in Tallinn, Riga and Helsinki. The US Foreign Service employee Henry W. Antheil Jr. was killed in the crash.

On 16 June 1940 the Soviets issued an ultimatum to Estonia and to Latvia.

On 18 June 1940 the German Ambassador to the Soviet Union Graf von der Schulenburg in his telegram said that earlier V. Molotov had "warmly" congratulated him on Germany's recent success in France and added that: (Note: This telegram and other important documents were originally published by the U.S. State Department. As authors of the pulibcation claimed, the documents, including telegram, were copied verbatim and translated. The documents originate from German Foreign Office archive captured by British and US troops in 1945. The next sources in Russian are duplicates of the same report and telegram translated into Russian.)

«[…] it had become necessary to put an end to all the intrigues by which England and France had tried to sow discord and mistrust between Germany and the Soviet Union in the Baltic States. […]Lithuanian border was evidently inadequately guarded. The Soviet Government would, therefore, if requested, assist the Lithuanian Government in guarding its borders.»

=== Red Army invades ===
Molotov had accused the Baltic states of conspiracy against the Soviet Union and delivered an ultimatum to all Baltic countries for the establishment of Soviet-approved governments. Threatening invasion and accusing the three states of violating the original pacts as well as forming a conspiracy against the Soviet Union, Moscow presented ultimatums, demanding new concessions, which included the replacement of their governments and allowing an unlimited number of troops to enter the three countries.

The Baltic governments had decided that, given their international isolation and the overwhelming Soviet forces on their borders and already on their territories, it was futile to actively resist and better to avoid bloodshed in an unwinnable war. The occupation of the Baltic states coincided with a communist coup d'état in each country, supported by the Soviet troops.

On 15 June the USSR invaded Lithuania. The Soviet troops attacked the Latvian border guards at Masļenki before invading Latvia and Estonia on 16 June. According to a Time magazine article published at the time of the invasions, in a matter of days around 500,000 Soviet Red Army troops occupied the three Baltic states – just one week before the Fall of France to Nazi Germany. The Soviet military forces far outnumbered the armies of each country.

Most of the Estonian Defence Forces and the Estonian Defence League surrendered according to the orders of the Estonian Government and were disarmed by the Red Army. Only the Estonian Independent Signal Battalion stationed in Tallinn at Raua Street showed resistance to the Red Army and "People's Self-Defence" Communist militia, fighting the invading troops on 21 June 1940. As the Red Army brought in additional reinforcements supported by six armoured fighting vehicles, the battle lasted several hours until sundown. Finally the military resistance was ended with negotiations and the Independent Signal Battalion surrendered and was disarmed. There were two dead Estonian servicemen, Aleksei Männikus and Johannes Mandre, and several wounded on the Estonian side and about ten killed and more wounded on the Soviet side. The Soviet militia that participated in the battle was led by Nikolai Stepulov.

=== Western reaction ===
Estonia was the only one of the three Baltic states that established a government in exile. It had legations in London and was the government recognized by the Western world during the Cold War. With the reestablishment of independence by the Soviet Republics leaving the USSR in 1990–1991, the government in exile was integrated into the new governing establishment. Latvia and Lithuania managed to preserve exile diplomatic services that had received emergency powers to represent the countries abroad, that worked as de facto governments-in-exile.

== Sovietization of the Baltic states ==
Political repressions followed with mass deportations of around 130,000 citizens carried out by the Soviets. The Serov Instructions, "On the Procedure for carrying out the Deportation of Anti-Soviet Elements from Lithuania, Latvia, and Estonia", contained detailed procedures and protocols to observe in the deportation of Baltic nationals.

The Soviets began a constitutional metamorphosis of the Baltic states by first forming transitional "People's Governments". Led by Stalin's close associates, and local communist supporters as well as officials brought in from the Soviet Union, they forced the presidents and governments of all three countries to resign, replacing them with the provisional People's Governments.

On 14–15 July, following illegal amendments to the electoral laws of the respective states, rigged parliamentary elections for the "People's Parliaments" were conducted by local Communists loyal to the Soviet Union. The laws were worded in such a way that the Communists and their allies were the only ones allowed to run. The election results were completely fabricated: the Soviet press service released them early, with the results having already appeared in print in a London newspaper a full 24 hours before the polls closed. The "People's Parliaments" met on 21 July, each with only one piece of business—a request to join the Soviet Union. These requests carried unanimously. In early August, the Supreme Soviet of the USSR accepted all three requests. The official Soviet narrative was that all three Baltic states simultaneously carried out socialist revolutions and voluntarily requested to join the Soviet Union.

The new Soviet-installed governments in the Baltic states began to align their policies with Soviet practices at the time. According to the prevailing doctrine in the process, the old "bourgeois" societies were destroyed so that new socialist societies, run by loyal Soviet citizens, could be constructed in their place.

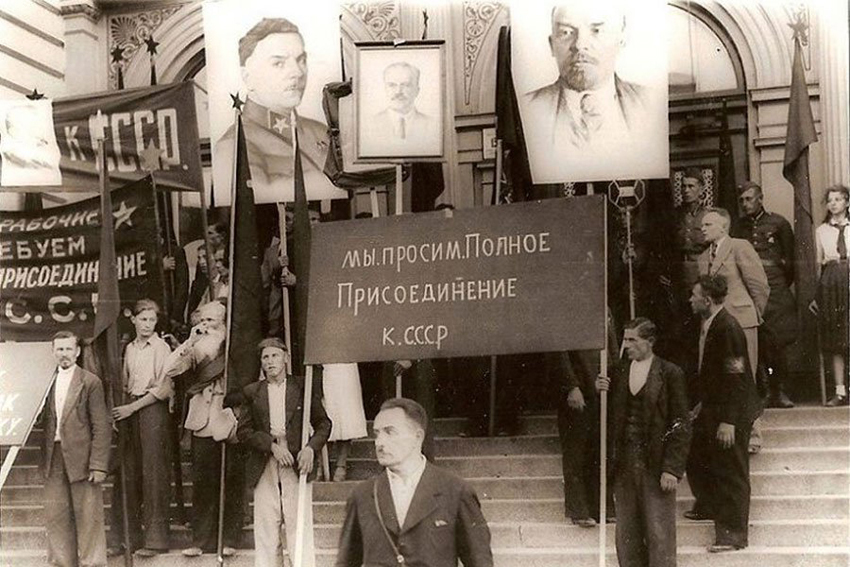
Soviet propaganda demonstration in Liepāja, 1940. Posters in Russian say: We demand the full accession to the USSR!

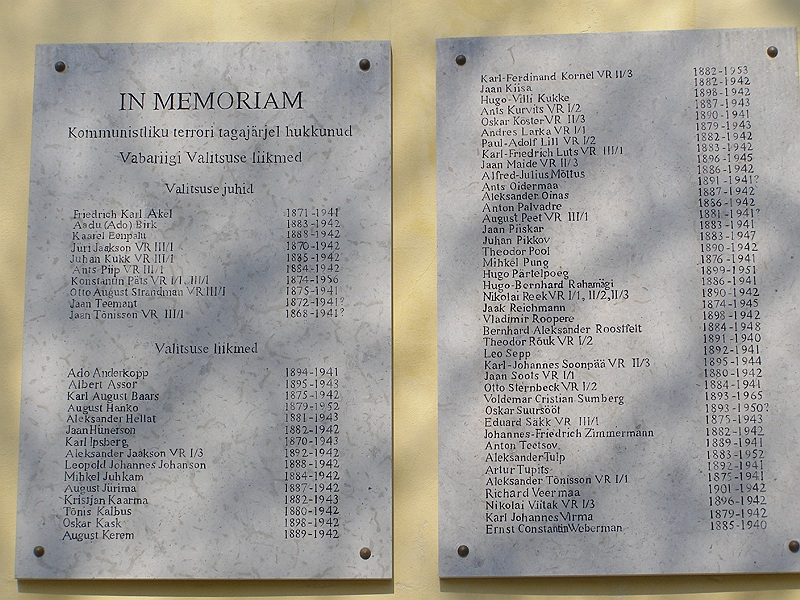
Plaque on the building of Government of Estonia, Toompea, commemorating government members killed by communist terror

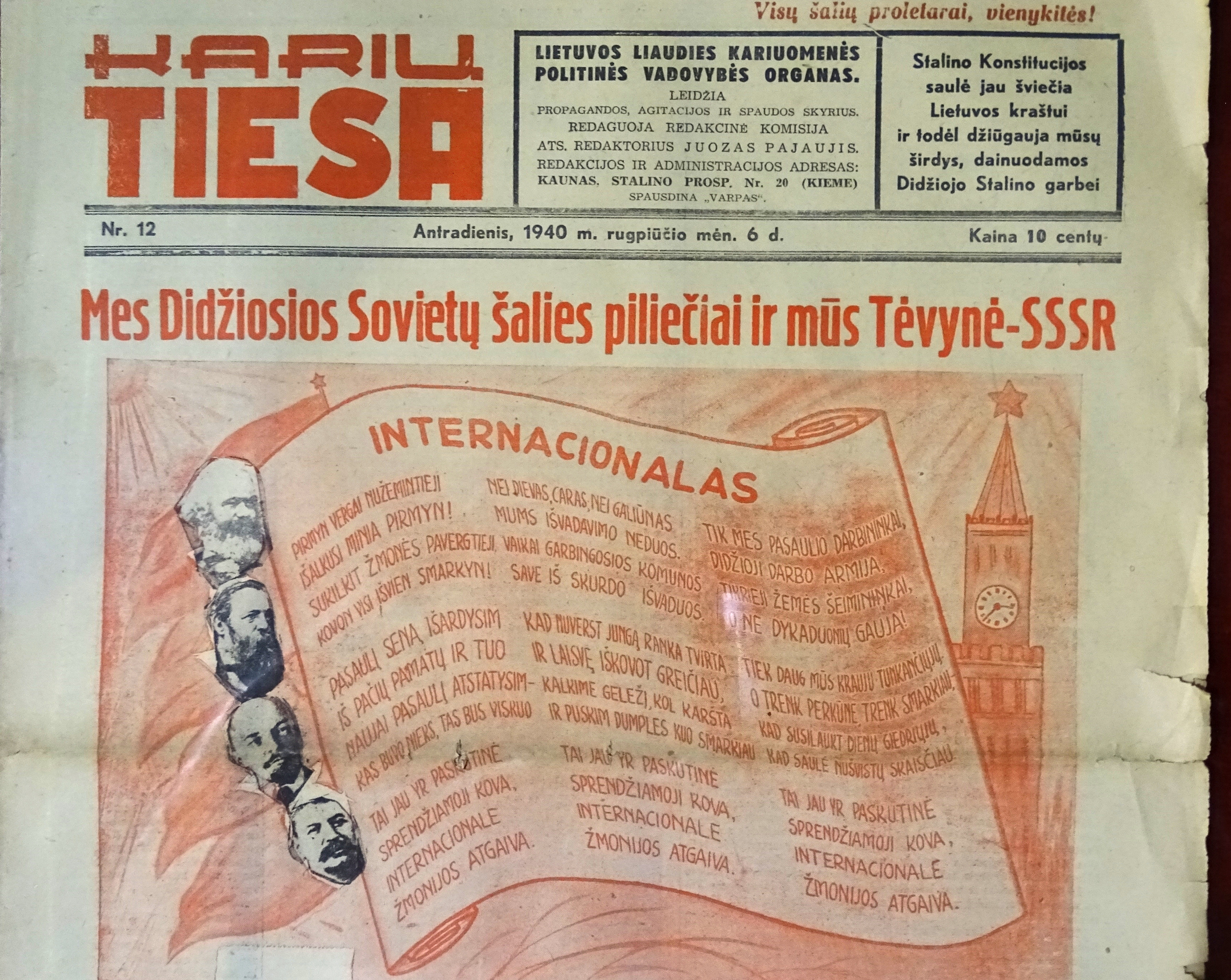
Soviet propaganda newspaper in Lithuanian language. Black text in the right square says: The Stalinist Constitution's sun already shines to the Lithuanian land and so our hearts rejoice by singing in honor of the great Stalin.

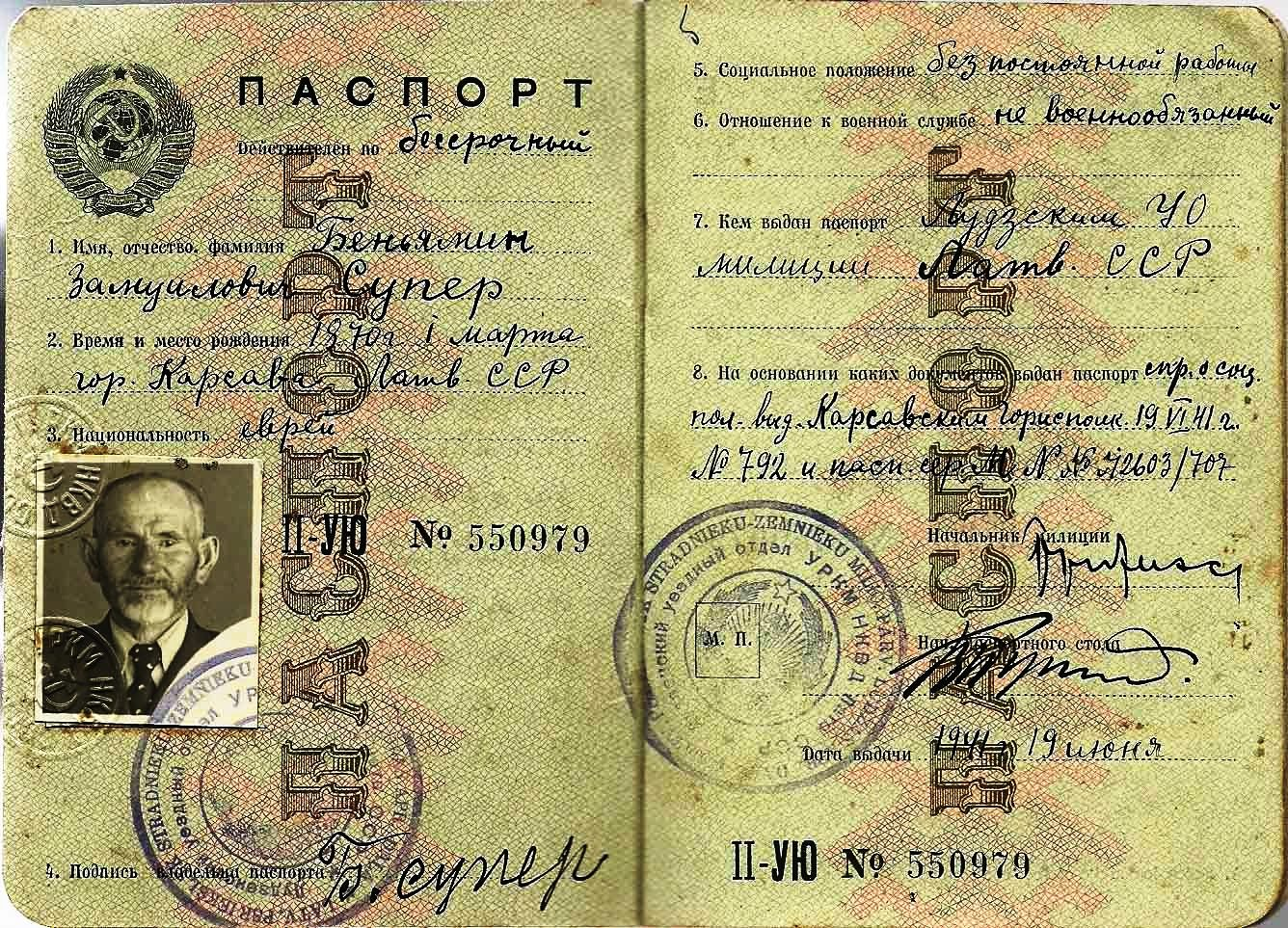
1941 Soviet internal-passport issued in occupied Latvia, shortly before the German invasion. The holder was an elderly Jewish man being evacuated at the end to Kuybyshev.

== See also ==
- June deportation – 1941 deportation of people from Soviet-occupied territories
- Soviet occupation of Latvia in 1940
- Soviet re-occupation of the Baltic states (1944)
