= German–Latvian Non-Aggression Pact =

1939 treaty between Germany and Latvia

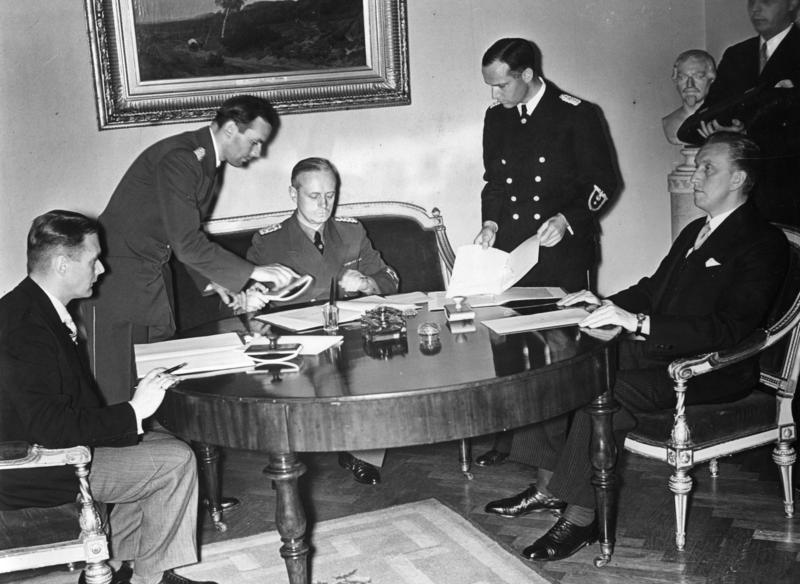
Signing of German–Estonian and German-Latvian nonaggression pacts. Sitting from the left: Vilhelms Munters, Latvian MFA, Joachim von Ribbentrop, German MFA; Karl Selter, Estonian MFA.

The German–Latvian Non-Aggression Pact was signed in Berlin on June 7, 1939.

In light of the German advance in the east, the Soviet government demanded an Anglo-French guarantee of the independence of the Baltic states during the negotiations for an alliance with the Western Powers. The Latvian and Estonian governments, ever suspicious of Soviet intentions, decided to accept a mutual non-aggression pact with Germany. The German–Estonian and German–Latvian Non-aggression pacts were signed in Berlin on June 7, 1939, by Latvian Foreign Minister Vilhelms Munters and German Foreign Minister Joachim von Ribbentrop. The next day, Adolf Hitler received the Estonian and Latvian envoys and, in the course of his interviews, stressed the maintaining and strengthening of commercial links between Germany and the Baltic states. Ratifications of the pact were exchanged in Berlin on July 24, 1939, and it became effective the same day. It was registered in League of Nations Treaty Series on August 24, 1939 and was intended for a period of ten years.

The pacts were intended to prevent western or Soviet powers from gaining influence in the Baltic states and thus encircling Germany. A non-aggression pact with Lithuania was concluded in March after the 1939 German ultimatum to Lithuania regarding the Klaipėda Region. The states were to provide a barrier against any Soviet intervention in a planned German–Polish war.

Germany offered to sign non-aggression pacts with Estonia, Latvia, Finland, Denmark, Norway and Sweden on April 28, 1939. Sweden, Norway and Finland rejected the proposal. The first drafts were prepared the first week of May, but the signing of the treaties was twice delayed by Latvia's requests for clarification.
