= Eric Assmus =

Eric Assmus (Russian: Эрих А. Асмус died 1937.12.9, literally Erih Asmus) was a Soviet diplomat of German descent.He joined the All-Union Communist Party (Bolsheviks) in 1918 and began working in diplomacy in 1923. From 1935 to 1937, he served as the Soviet Plenipotentiary Representative to Finland.

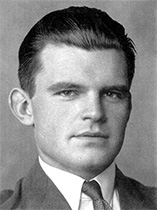
picture of Assmus in the 1930s

Preceded by Boris Shtein, Assmus was Ambassador to Finland from 1935 to 1937. He contacted Finnish Prime Minister Toivo Kivimäki on 15 June 1935 that "in case of a military conflict in the Mainland Europe, the Soviet Union could be forced to occupy some parts of Finland". On 10 February 1936, Kivimäki reported his private conversation with Assmus to Juho Kusti Paasikivi:

"in case Germany starts a war to any direction, Russia is forced to annihilate Finland to defuse it. It is possible that the enemy great power could use Finland to attack Russia, and to prevent this Russia have to occupy Finland. According to Russian military experts this would happen in days".

On August 16, 1937, after Assmus left Helsinki, he was arrested by the NKVD. At the time of his arrest, he was living in apartment number 78, building number 5, Kalyaevskaya Street, Moscow. In 1938, the NKVD agent Boris Yartsev started unsuccessful negotiations between Finland and the Soviet Union.

Rehabilitated on June 27, 1956, by a ruling of the Military Collegium of the Supreme Court of the USSR.
