= Soviet–Estonian Mutual Assistance Treaty =

1939 treaty allowing Soviet troops and military bases within Estonia

The Soviet–Estonian Mutual Assistance Treaty (Estonian: Eesti Vabariigi ja NSV Liidu vaheline vastastikuse abistamise pakt, Russian: Пакт о взаимопомощи между СССР и Эстонией, romanized: Pakt o vzaimopomoshchi mezhdu SSSR i Estoniyey), also known as the Bases Treaty (Estonian: baaside leping) was a bilateral treaty between the Soviet Union and Estonia, signed in Moscow on 28 September 1939. The treaty obliged both parties to respect each other's sovereignty and independence, and allowed the Soviet government to establish military bases in Estonia. These bases facilitated the Soviet takeover of the country in June 1940.

It was signed by Estonian Minister of Foreign Affairs Karl Selter and Soviet Commissar of Foreign Affairs Vyacheslav Molotov. Ratifications were exchanged in Tallinn on 4 October 1939 and the treaty became effective on the same day. It was registered in League of Nations Treaty Series on 13 October 1939.

== Background ==
In September 1939 the Soviet Union asserted its control over the Baltic states with the Molotov–Ribbentrop Pact. The Soviets invaded Poland on 17 September, concluding operations on 6 October. After occupying eastern Poland, the Soviets pressured Finland and the Baltic states to conclude mutual assistance treaties. The Soviets questioned the neutrality of Estonia following the escape of a Polish submarine on 18 September. A week later, on 24 September, the Estonian foreign minister Karl Selter was given an ultimatum in Moscow. The Soviets demanded the conclusion of a treaty of mutual assistance which included the establishment of military bases in Estonia. The Estonian government yielded to the ultimatum.

== Articles of the treaty ==
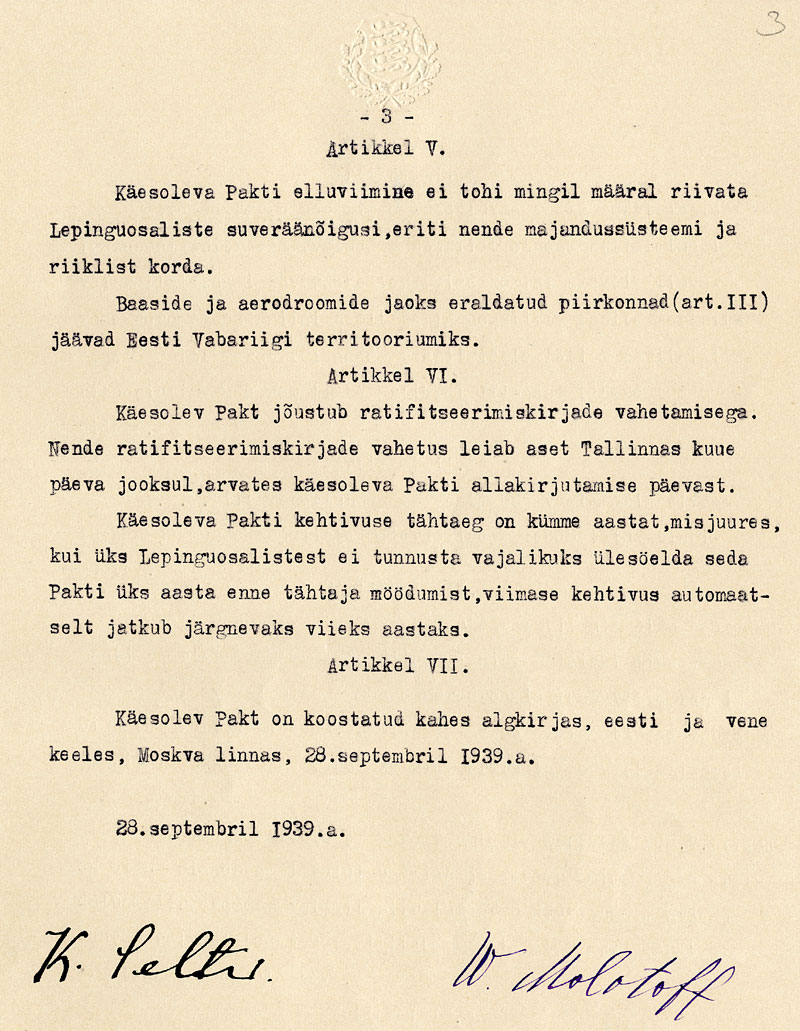
third page

- Article 1 provided for military cooperation between the parties in case of an attack by a third party.
- Article 2 obliged the Soviet government to assist the Estonian government in providing armaments.
- Article 3 permitted the Soviet government to establish military and naval bases on Estonian territory.
- Article 4 obliged the Soviet and Estonian governments not to engage in military alliances against the other party.
- Article 5 stipulated that the political and economic systems and the sovereignty of both parties shall not be affected by the treaty. It clearly stipulated that the areas where Soviet bases were to be established shall remain part of Estonia.
- Article 6 dealt with ratification, and stipulated that the treaty shall remain in force for ten years, with an option to extend it for further five years.
- Article 7 stipulated that the official text of the treaty would be in the Russian and Estonian languages.

== Aftermath ==
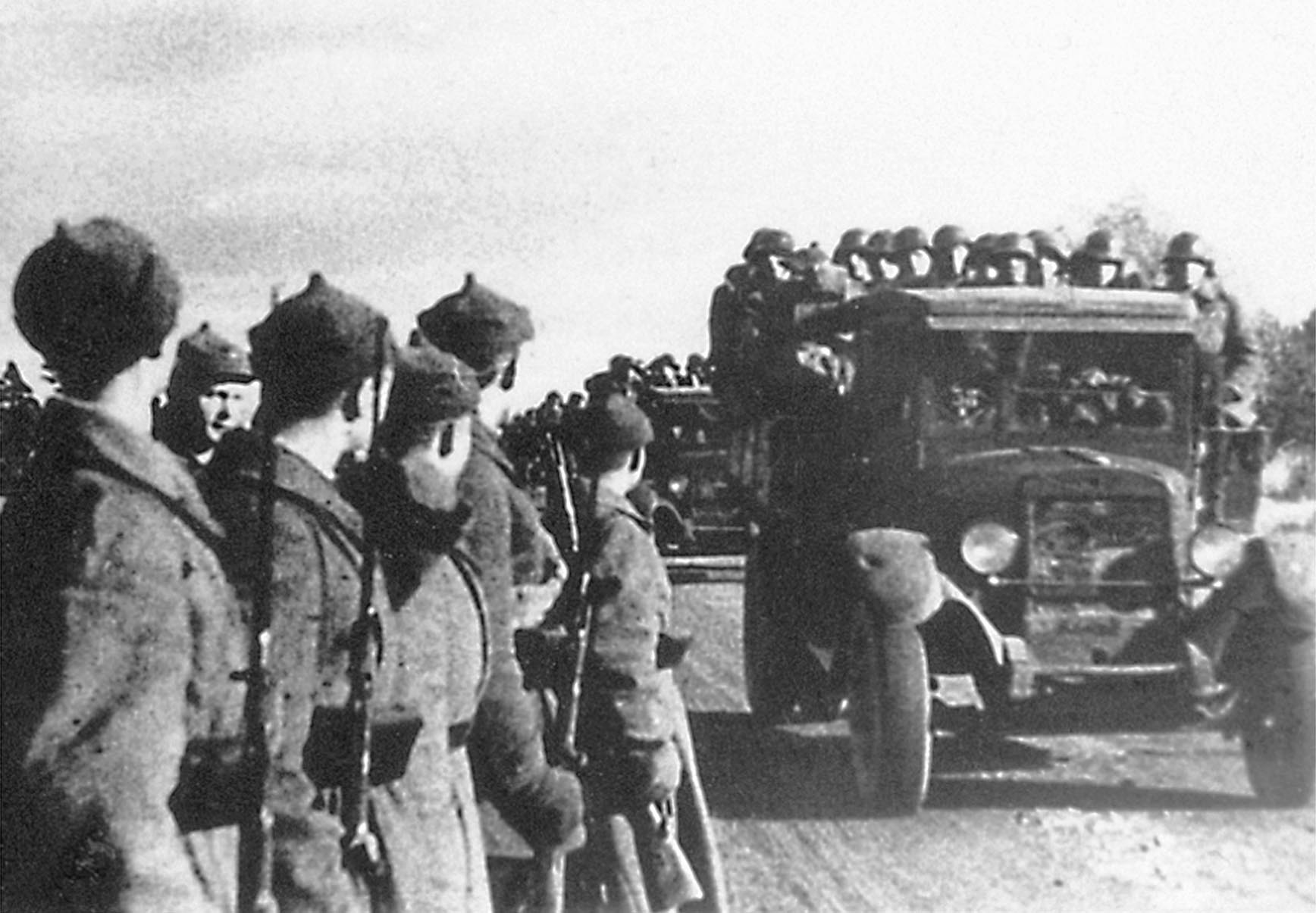
Red Army entering Estonia in 1939 after Estonia had been forced to sign the bases treaty.

The Soviets made similar treaties with Latvia on 5 October and Lithuania on 10 October. The latter treaty transferred Vilnius district to Lithuania. Finland was invited to enter similar negotiations on 5 October. Unlike the Baltics, the Finnish-Soviet negotiations lasted weeks without result.

During October 1939, the Soviet government began stationing troops in Estonia in numbers exceeding the Estonian armed forces. As a result, the Soviet government gradually gained control over the territory of Estonia. This allowed the Soviet forces to sink the Estonian merchant ship Kassari in the Baltic sea on December 10, 1939 without any Estonian response.

The Soviets invaded Finland on 30 November.

On 16 June 1940 the Soviets issued an ultimatum to Estonia (and to Latvia). On 17 June 1940 the Soviets occupied and annexed Estonia after invading the two other Baltic states.

== Gallery ==
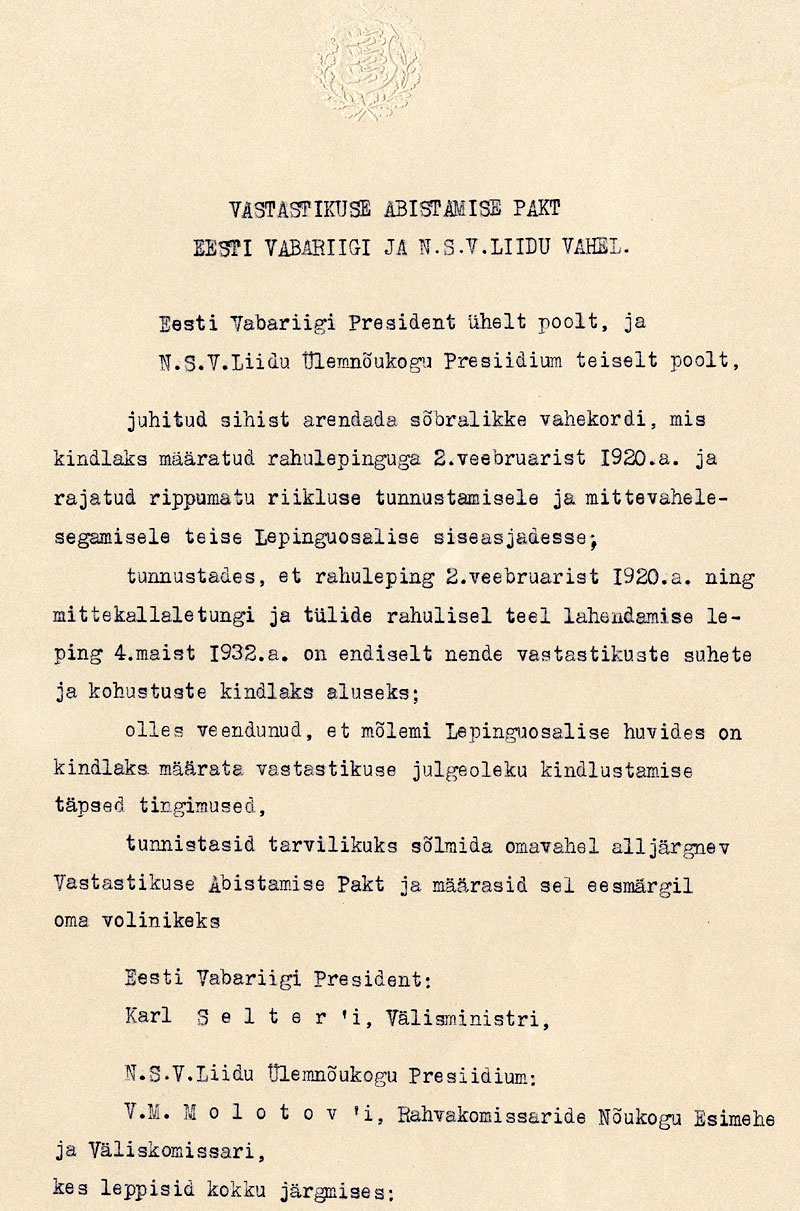

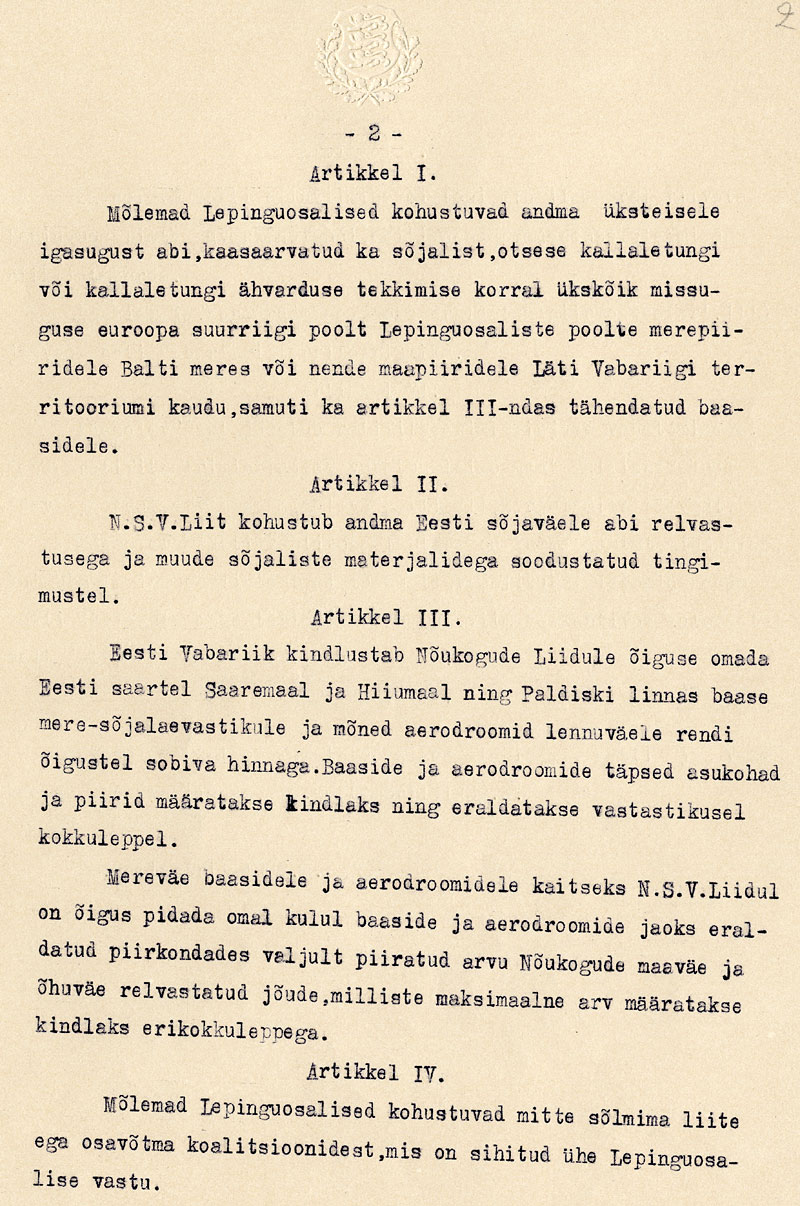

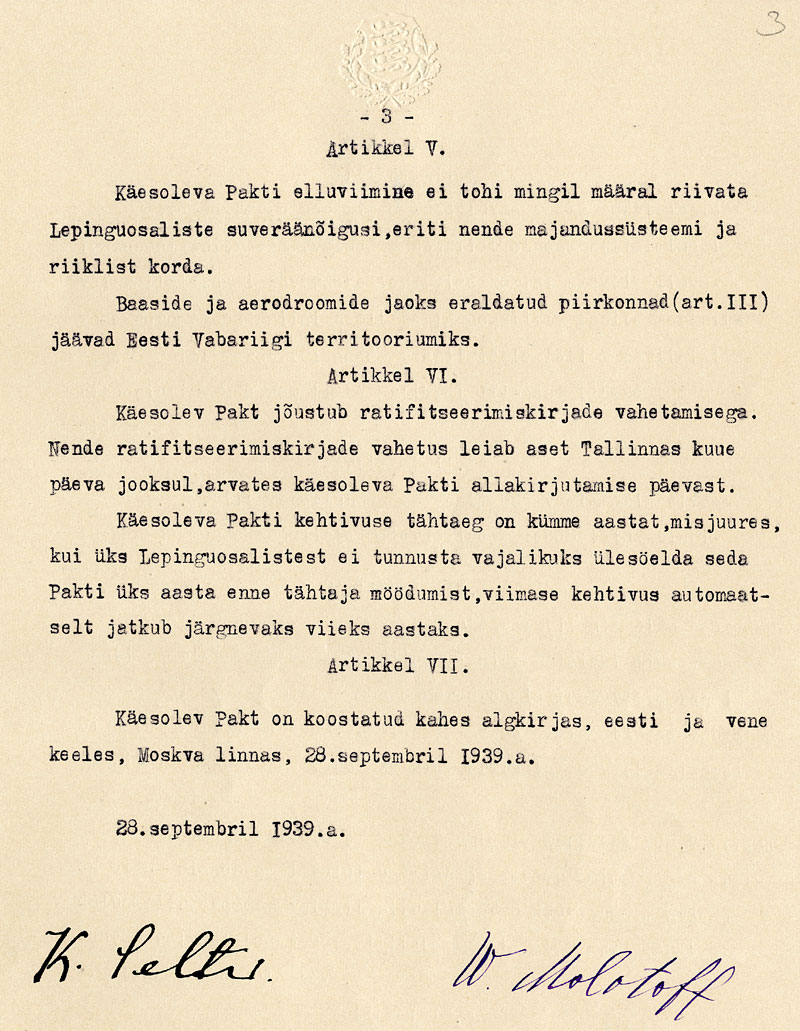

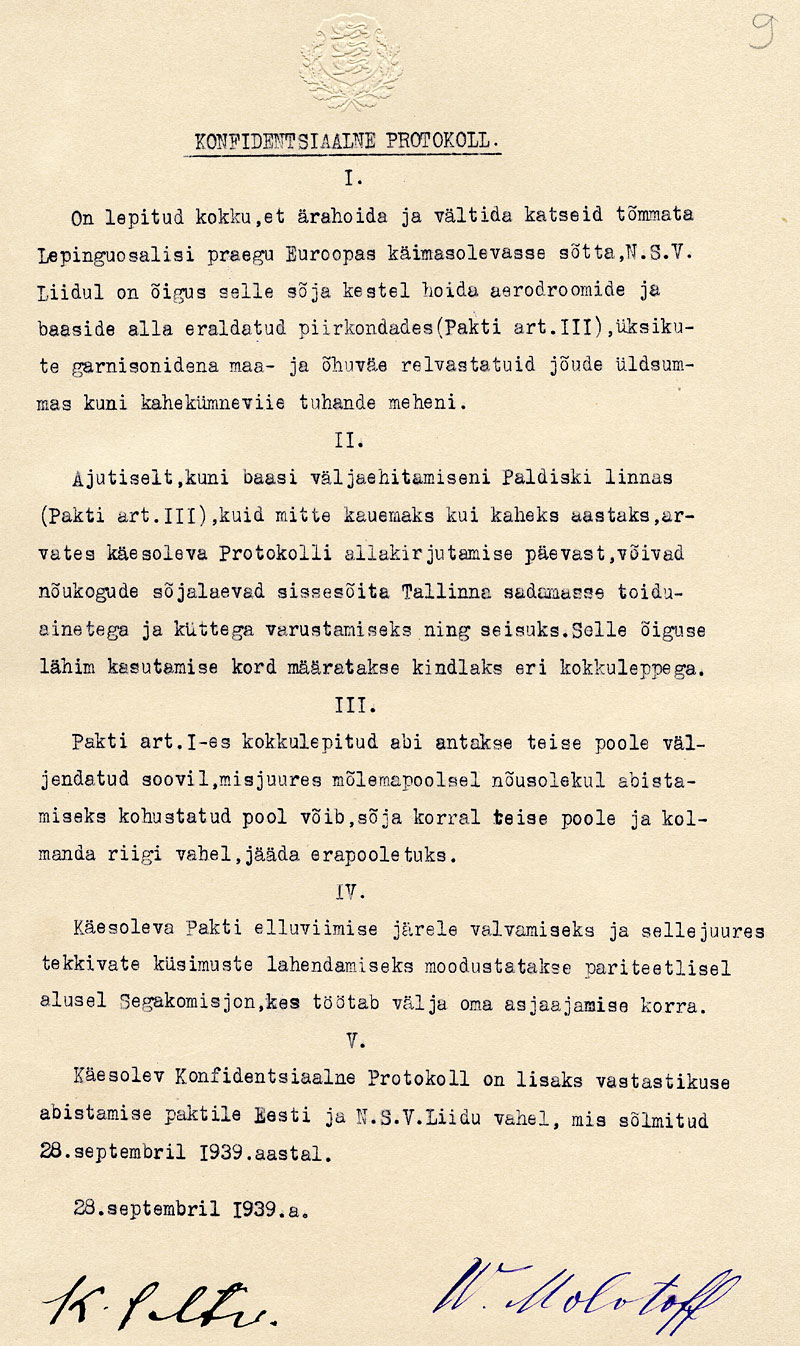

== See also ==
- Soviet–Latvian Mutual Assistance Treaty
- Soviet–Lithuanian Mutual Assistance Treaty
