= Vilhelms Munters =

Latvian politician and diplomat (1898–1967)

Minister of Foreign Affairs of Latvia
- In office 14 July 1936 – 20 June 1940
- Prime Minister: Kārlis Ulmanis
- Preceded by: Ludvigs Ēķis
- Succeeded by: Augusts Kirhenšteins

Personal details
- Born: 25 July 1898 Riga, Russian Empire (now Latvia)
- Died: 11 January 1967 (aged 68) Riga, then part of Latvian SSR, Soviet Union
- Party: Independent
- Domestic partner: Natālija Kļagina (m. 1934)
- Education: University of Latvia

Gothards Vilhelms Nikolajs Munters (German: Gotthard Wilhelm Nikolai Munter, 25 July 1898 – 11 January 1967) was a Latvian diplomat who served as Minister of Foreign Affairs of the Republic of Latvia from 1936 to 1940. He was also a member of the Council of the League of Nations from 1936 to 1938, Chairman of the Far East Commission and the president of the 101st Session of the league in 1938.

Munters was the signatory on behalf of the Latvian government in a number of important international agreements with the Baltic states, Nazi Germany and the Soviet Union from 1934 to 1939.

== Biography ==
=== Early life ===
Vilhelms Munters was born on 25 July 1898, in Riga to Estonian trader Nikolai Munter (Nikolajs Munters, died 1930) and Baltic German mother from Estonia, Auguste Klein (Kleina). She and Vilhelm's sister later repatriated to Germany in 1939. He graduated with a gold medal from Riga Stock Exchange Business School in 1915 and enrolled in the Faculty of Chemistry of the Riga Polytechnic Institute. That same year he, together with the institute, evacuated to Moscow due to World War I and continued his studies until 1917. On 22 May 1917, Munters was drafted into the Imperial Russian Army, where he served in the 1st Preparatory Training Battalion in Nizhny Novgorod and from 8 August to 26 October studied at the Vladimir Military School in Saint Petersburg. He, together with other cadets, took part in fighting during the Bolshevik October Revolution and was shortly imprisoned in the Peter and Paul Fortress, but released thanks to an acquaintance. Afterwards he worked as an oiler in the Treugolnik (Russian: Треугольник) factory.

After the signing of the Treaty of Brest-Litovsk, Munters returned to German-occupied Riga in July 1918. During the Latvian War of Independence he was drafted by the Army of the Latvian Socialist Soviet Republic in March 1919, only to soon desert. After the Battle of Cēsis he joined the 6th Infantry Regiment, 1st Division of the Estonian Army on 24 June 1919. Munters fought in North Vidzeme, served as the Estonian Army Command team leader and the aide-de-camp of the Viljandi Garrison of the 6th Infantry Regiment until 17 October 1920, when he was retired from active service with the rank of lieutenant.

On 22 November 1920, he was drafted into the Latvian Armed Forces and assigned to the 6th Riga Infantry Regiment, but was discharged with the rank of virsseržants (staff sergeant) on 20 December. While working for the Ministry of Foreign Affairs of Latvia, Munters resumed his studies at the Faculty of Chemistry of the University of Latvia and graduated in 1925 with a degree in engineering chemistry (ing. chem.).

In 1934, he married Natālija Sūna (née Kļagina, 1897–1973 in Riga). They had one son, Andrejs (born 1935), and an adopted daughter, Margarita (born 1934), both of which died in a children's home in the Uzbek SSR in 1942 during the family's deportation. Natālija also had a son from a previous marriage, Nikolajs Sūna (born 1921).

=== Diplomatic service career ===
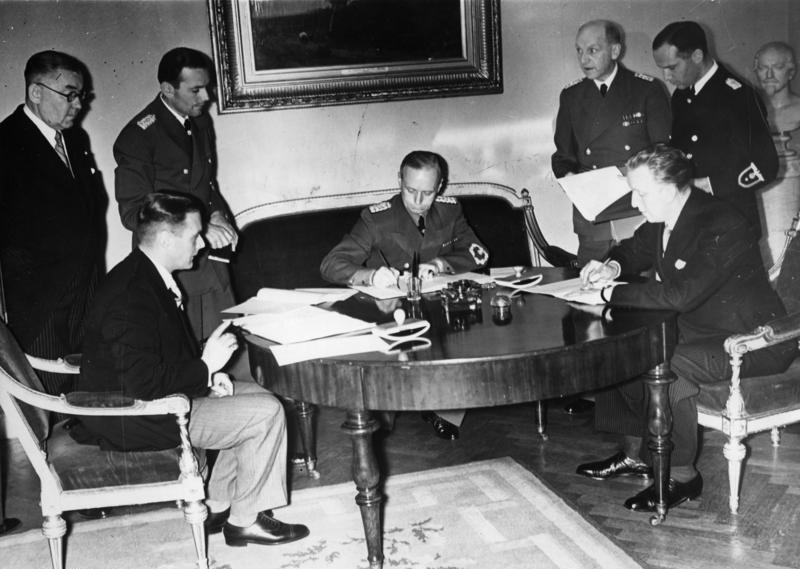
V. Munters (left) during the signing of the non-aggression pact, June 7, 1939. Joachim fon Ribbentrop is seated in the middle, on the right - Karl Selter, the Estonian foreign minister

Since 20 December 1920, Munters began working at the Ministry of Foreign Affairs of Latvia. Until October 1921 he was the 3rd secretary of the Information Section of the Political-Economic Department, reaching the post of 1st secretary in August 1922. In April 1923 he was transferred to the Western Section, in April 1924 – the Press Section, and in February 1925 he took charge of the Baltic States Section. Two years later he was appointed as a representative of the ministry to the External Trade Commission of the Ministry of Finance, and in January 1931 Munters became the director of the Administrative-Legal Department and the assistant general secretary of the ministry. His salary in 1927 was 3600 Ls per year, and he lived in a three-room apartment in Stabu iela 62.

In addition to his posts, Munters was a member of various high-rank committees in the ministry and took part in drafting important economic and political agreements with foreign nations. Since 1931, he participated in all plenary meetings of the League of Nations.

On 14 July 1933, Munters was appointed general secretary of the Ministry of Foreign Affairs with vice-ministerial functions. After the 1934 Latvian coup d'état led by Kārlis Ulmanis, despite Ulmanis taking up the post of Minister of Foreign Affairs on 17 July, Munters became the de facto head of the ministry. From 1935 to 1939 he led the Latvian delegation at the League of Nations, being the main representative from 1936 to 1938. There, in 1937 on the 13th Plenary Session he was elected head of the Far East Commission, but in 1938 as the president of the 101st Session.

Vilhelms Munters became the minister of foreign affairs of the Republic of Latvia on 14 July 1936, and served in this capacity until 21 June 1940. On 7 June 1939, Munters signed the German-Latvian Non-Aggression Pact in Berlin and on 5 October 1939 - the Soviet–Latvian Mutual Assistance Treaty (commonly known in Latvia as the "(Military) Base Treaty"), which the USSR later used as the basis of the Soviet occupation of Latvia in 1940.

=== Deportation and imprisonment ===
After the Soviet occupation of Latvia, he was de facto replaced by Augusts Kirhenšteins, and the Munters family was deported on 16 July 1940 in the presence of the collaborationist minister of the interior Vilis Lācis. During forced exile in Voronezh, he worked in the Institute of Foreign Language Teachers. In the meantime, Munters wrote multiple requests to Soviet People's Commissar for Internal Affairs Lavrentiy Beria, sharing detailed information on many contemporaries.

On 26 June 1941 Munters was arrested. First imprisoned in Voronezh, he was transferred to Saratov in September and a year later - to Kirov Prison. There, on 14 April 1952, the Special Council of the NKVD sentenced Munters to 25 years in prison for "active struggle against the revolutionary workers' movement and hostile actions against the USSR" and imprisoned him in Moscow's Butyrka prison and Vladimir Central Prison. After the death of Joseph Stalin, he was released on 19 August 1954, but was forbidden to return to the Baltic states.

=== Final years and death ===
After release, Munters and his family lived in Vladimir-on-Klyazma, with him working as a translator in the Vladimir Tractor Factory. In 1958 he together with his family was finally permitted to return to occupied Latvia, where in 1959 he started to work as a translator in the editorial board of the official newsletter of the Latvian SSR Academy of Sciences, with contributions to other scientific publications.

Since 1962, Munters penned articles in Izvestia and Soviet Latvian press, critical of Latvian diaspora organizations (e.g. the American Latvian Association and others). In 1963, he published his memoirs Pārdomas ('Reflections') and in 1964 an essay on the Assembly of Captive European Nations, titled Savu tautu ienaidnieki ('Enemies of Their Peoples'). The same year he was appointed a member of the KGB-controlled Latvian Committee for Cultural Relations with Compatriots Abroad. The official purpose of these committees, founded in several Soviet republics in the 1960s, was the development of cultural contacts an promoting peace, but the secret purpose was investigation of the emigrant communities and using them in order to destabilize the democratic Western states.

Vilhelms Munters died on 11 January 1967 in Riga and was buried in the Forest Cemetery on 15 January.

== Awards and decorations ==
- (Latvia) Order of Lāčplēsis (1924, No. 1814)
- (Latvia) Order of the Three Stars, 2nd (14 May 1937), 3rd and 4th Class
- (Latvia) Cross of Recognition, 1st Class (16 November 1938, No. 2)
- (Latvia) Aizsargi Cross of Merit
- (Latvia) Medal of the Latvian Defense Society
- (Sweden) Order of the Polar Star, 1st (1937), 2nd and 3rd Class
- (Finland) Order of the White Rose, 1st and 2nd Class
- (Lithuania) Order of the Lithuanian Grand Duke Gediminas, 1st and 2nd Class
- (Lithuania) Order of Vytautas the Great, 1st Class
- (Belgium) Order of Leopold, 1st and 2nd Class
- (Belgium) Order of the Crown, 3rd Class
- (Estonia) Cross of Liberty, 1st Grade 1st and 2nd Class
- (Estonia) Order of the Cross of the Eagle, 1st and 2nd Class
- (Kingdom of Italy) Order of the Crown of Italy, 1st and 2nd Class
- (Kingdom of Italy) Order of Saints Maurice and Lazarus, 1st Class
- (Kingdom of Yugoslavia) Order of St. Sava, 2nd Class
- (Portugal) Military Order of Christ, 2nd Class
- (Luxembourg) Order of the Oak Crown, 3rd Class
- (Poland) Order of Polonia Restituta, 1st and 3rd Class
- (French Third Republic) Legion of Honour, 2nd, 3rd and 5th Class
- Decoration of Honour for Services to the Republic of Austria, 1st Class
- (Vatican City) Order of St. Gregory the Great, 1st Class
- (Taiwan) Order of Brilliant Star, 1st Class
- (Kingdom of Romania) Order of the Crown, 2nd Class
- (Nazi Germany) Order of the German Eagle, 1st Class
- (Denmark) Order of the Dannebrog, 1st and 2nd Class

== Literature ==
- Munters, Vilhelms, Historia.lv (in Latvian)
- Rihards, Treijs (2010). Vilhelms Munters. Jumava. p. 242. ISBN 978-9984-38-803-8. (in Latvian)
- Vilhelma Muntera ēra Latvijā, Tekla Šaitere, Arhīvs / Diena (in Latvian)
