= German–Estonian Non-Aggression Pact =

1939 treaty

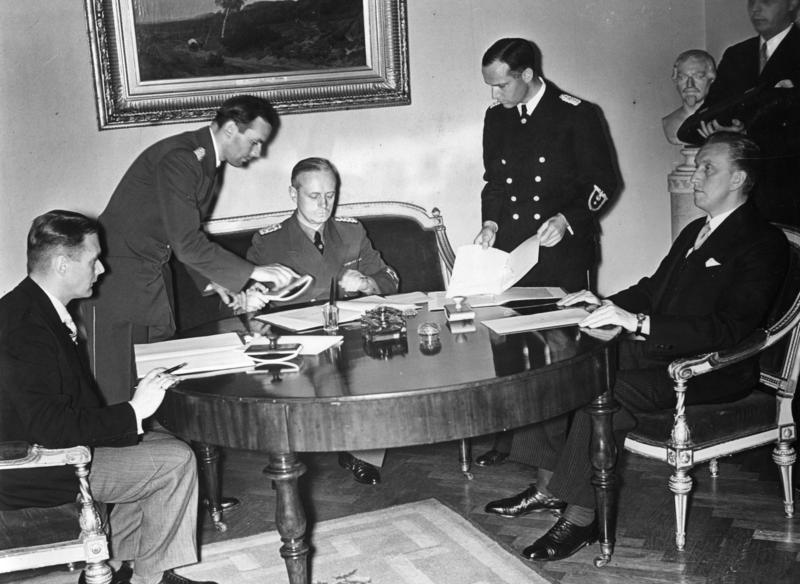
Signing of German–Estonian and German-Latvian nonaggression pacts. Sitting from the left: Vilhelms Munters, Latvian MFA, Joachim von Ribbentrop, German MFA; Karl Selter, Estonian MFA.

The German–Estonian Non-Aggression Pact was signed in Berlin on 7 June 1939 by Estonian and German Foreign Ministers Karl Selter and Joachim von Ribbentrop. The German–Latvian Non-Aggression Pact was also signed on the same day. Ratifications of the German-Estonian Pact were exchanged in Berlin on 24 July 1939, and it became effective the same day. It was registered in League of Nations Treaty Series on 12 August 1939. The pact was intended for a period of ten years.

The pacts were intended to prevent the West or the Soviets from gaining influence in the Baltic states and thus encircling Germany. A non-aggression pact with Lithuania was concluded in March after the 1939 German ultimatum to Lithuania regarding the Klaipėda Region. The states were to provide a barrier against any Soviet intervention in a planned German–Polish war.

Germany offered to sign non-aggression pacts with Estonia, Latvia, Finland, Denmark, Norway and Sweden on 28 April 1939. Sweden, Norway and Finland rejected the proposal. The first drafts were prepared the first week of May, but the signing of the treaties was twice delayed by Latvia's requests for clarification.
