= Soviet–Latvian Mutual Assistance Treaty =

1939 treaty allowing Soviet troops and military bases within Latvia

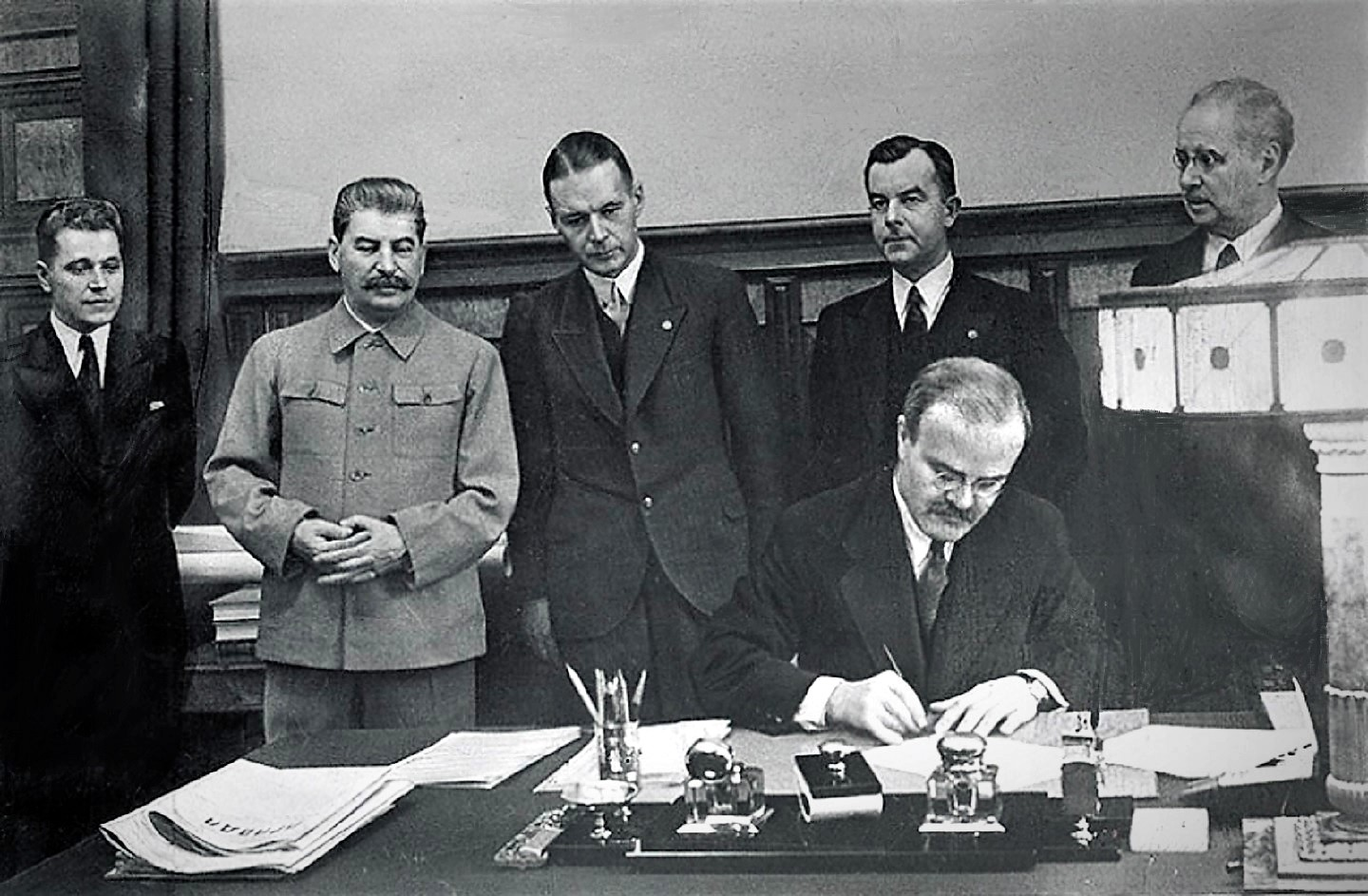
Signing of the Soviet–Latvian Mutual Assistance Treaty by Minister of Foreign Affairs of the USSR Vyacheslav Molotov. Standing behind him are (from left to right): the Plenipotentiary of the USSR in Latvia Ivan Zotov, Secretary of the VKP(b) Joseph Stalin, Minister of Foreign Affairs of Latvia Vilhelms Munters, Ambassador of Latvia in the USSR Fricis Kociņš and first Deputy of Foreign Affairs Vladimir Potyomkin

The Soviet–Latvian Mutual Assistance Treaty (Russian: Пакт о взаимопомощи между СССР и Латвийской Республикой, Latvian: Savstarpējās palīdzības pakts starp Latviju un PSRS) was a bilateral treaty between the Soviet Union and Latvia, signed in Moscow on October 5, 1939. The treaty obliged both parties to respect each other's sovereignty and independence, while in practice allowed the Soviet government to establish military bases in Latvia, which facilitated the Soviet invasion of the country in June 1940.

It was signed by Latvian Minister of Foreign Affairs Vilhelms Munters and Soviet Commissar of Foreign Affairs Vyacheslav Molotov. Ratifications were exchanged in Riga on October 11, 1939, and the treaty became effective on the same day. It was registered in League of Nations Treaty Series on November 6, 1939.

== Background ==
On 23 August 1939 the Soviet Union asserted its control over the Baltic states with the Molotov–Ribbentrop Pact. The Soviets invaded Poland on 17 September, concluding operations on 6 October. After occupying eastern Poland, the Soviets pressured Finland and the Baltic states to conclude mutual assistance treaties. The Soviets questioned the neutrality of Estonia following the escape of a Polish submarine on 18 September. A week later, on 24 September, the Estonian foreign minister Karl Selter was given an ultimatum in Moscow. After four days of negotiations, the Estonians had no choice but to accept naval, air and army bases. Soviet troop numbers in Estonia were put at 25,000. The mutual assistance treaty was signed on 28 September. As a result, soon two other Baltic states yielded to Soviet pressure.

== Articles of the treaty ==
- Article 1 provided for military cooperation between the parties in case of an attack by a third party.
- Article 2 obliged the Soviet government to assist the Latvian government in providing armaments.
- Article 3 permitted the Soviet government to establish military and naval bases on Latvian territory.
- Article 4 obliged the Soviet and Latvian governments not to engage in military alliances against the other party.
- Article 5 stipulated that the political and economic systems and the sovereignty of both parties shall not be affected by the treaty. It clearly stipulated that the areas where Soviet bases were to be established shall remain part of Latvia.
- Article 6 dealt with ratification, and stipulated that the treaty shall remain in force for ten years, with an option to extend it for further ten years.

== Aftermath ==
Finland was invited to enter similar negotiations on 5 October. Unlike the Baltics, the Finnish-Soviet negotiations lasted weeks without result. The Soviets invaded Finland on 30 November.

On the morning of 15 June 1940 Soviet NKVD troops carried out an attack on Latvian border posts killing 5 people and taking 37 as hostages. The next day USSR accused Latvia of violating the mutual assistance treaty and demanded the formation of a new government and allowed entry of an unlimited number of Soviet troops into the country. Latvia was given 6 hours to respond to the ultimatum and, given the circumstances, it conceded to the Soviet demands.

== See also ==
- Soviet–Estonian Mutual Assistance Treaty
- Soviet–Lithuanian Mutual Assistance Treaty
