= Boris Rybkin =

Soviet diplomat

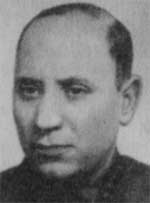
Boris Rybkin

Boris Arkadyevich Rybkin (Russian: Бори́с Арка́дьевич Ры́бкин; born Boruch Aronovich Rivkin Russian: Борух Аронович Рывкин; 19 June 1899 – 27 November 1947) was a Soviet diplomat and a secret agent of the NKVD. He worked as a junior diplomatic official under the name Boris Yartsev at the Soviet Union embassy in Helsinki.

== Early life ==
Rybkin was born Boruch Aronovich Rivkin in Novovitebsk, in the Khersonsky Uyezd of Kherson Governorate, into a Ukrainian Jewish family on June 19, 1899.

== Career ==
Rybkin joined the Soviet secret police, the Cheka, in 1921 and the Russian Communist Party (Bolsheviks) in 1922. He served in the Stalingrad district from 1924 to 1929. In 1931, he was sent to Tashkent, in Central Asia, and later to Iran. He also made business trips to France, Bulgaria, and Austria.

In September 1935, Rybkin was posted as a second-class secretary to the Soviet embassy in Helsinki under the name Boris Yartsev. In April 1938, Joseph Stalin gave Rybkin the mission of starting secret negotiations with the Finnish government to address the threat from Nazi Germany. The Soviet Union offered all possible economic and military assistance if Finland fought against Germany in the event of German invasion while demanding that Finland cede or lease some islands near Leningrad to the Soviet Union and agreeing to permit the Finnish fortification of Åland. When Finland rejected those terms the Soviets reduced their demands; Finland rejected those as well for fear of appearing to abandon their neutrality. Negotiations continued with Boris Shtein replacing Rybkin until March 1939, when they ended without result.

The Soviet Union attacked Finland on 30 November 1939, starting the Winter War. In 1941, Rybkin moved to the Soviet embassy in Stockholm.

Rybkin returned to the Soviet Union in 1943. During the Second World War, he served as a chief under the NKGB in the Northern Caucasus. In 1943, Rybkin was awarded the military rank of colonel of state security and in 1944 he became head of the department responsible for the introduction of illegal agents and reconnaissance and sabotage groups into the countries of Eastern Europe occupied by the Nazis. In February 1945, Rybkin was liaison officer with the Allied security services at the Yalta Conference. In February 1947, he began to serve in the MGB.

From February 1947, he served in the "DR" department (Special Service) of the MGB of the USSR, which was headed by Pavel Sudoplatov and tasked with conducting sabotage operations abroad. He traveled to Turkey and other countries to reestablish contact with illegal agents in the Middle East and Eastern Europe and to carry out operational activities.

== Personal life and death ==
Rybkin married Zoya Voskresenskaya, another intelligence agent, who worked under him during his posting in Helsinki and who later became a prominent author of children's literature.

Rybkin died in a car crash in Czechoslovakia in 1947. Voskresenskaya refused to accept the official version, but failed to get permission to investigate the case personally.
