= Soviet ultimatum to Estonia =

1940 prelude to occupation

The Soviet ultimatum to Estonia was issued on 16 June 1940, with the demand to answer by the midnight of the same day. The pretext was political activities of Estonia allegedly in contradiction to the Soviet–Estonian Mutual Assistance Treaty. The demands were to set up a new government and to allow Soviet troops into Estonia. The Estonian government, after long deliberations, submitted the resignation to President Konstantin Päts, which he signed and an announcement was broadcast about the resignation and the expected entrance of the Soviet Army. The Soviet forces started occupation of Estonia the next day. It was part of the Soviet occupation of the Baltic States.

== Background ==
The Soviet occupation of the Baltic States was based on the 1939 secret protocol added to the Molotov–Ribbentrop Pact, which divided the spheres of influence of the Soviet Union and Nazi Germany.

In 1939, under Soviet pressure, the Soviet–Estonian Mutual Assistance Treaty was signed, similar to the Soviet-Latvian and Soviet-Lithuanian treaties. Under the treaties, Soviet military bases were to be established in all Baltic States, in particular, 25,000 Soviet soldiers were dispatched to Estonia. Also, the Soviet Union occupied the island of Naissaar that controlled sea access to Tallinn, the capital of Estonia.

== Ultimatum ==
The ultimatum was handed at 2.30pm (Moscow time) on 16 June 1940, with the demand to answer by the midnight of the same day. The pretext was political activities of Estonia allegedly in contradiction to the Soviet–Estonian Mutual Assistance Treaty. The demands were to set up a new government and to allow Soviet troops into Estonia.

In addition, Johannes Klesment claimed that Molotov declared that "in the event no answer indicating acceptance of the ultimatum was received by the stated time, the Red Army units concentrated at the border of the Estonian Republic would be ordered to march into the country, suppressing all resistance by armed force."

The Estonian government decided, in accordance with the Kellogg–Briand Pact, to not respond to the ultimatum by military means. Given the overwhelming Soviet force both on the borders and inside the country, the order was given not to resist in order to avoid bloodshed and open war. The government submitted the resignation to President Konstantin Päts, which he signed and an announcement was broadcast about the resignation and the expected entrance of the Soviet Army.

Molotov's claims of violations were not supported by any evidence, neither in the ultimatum, nor any time later. Moreover, the position of the Soviet Union had no legal foundation, because the treaty stipulated that the resolution of disagreements must first proceed in peaceful form, by means of diplomatic negotiations.

== Aftermath ==
On 16–17 June 1940, the Red Army emerged from its military bases in Estonia and, aided by an additional 90,000 Soviet troops, took over the country, occupying the entire territory of the Republic of Estonia. It was evident that the ultimatum was only a pretext, because the amassed Soviet troops marched immediately after receiving the answer from Estonia.

Most of the Estonian Defence Forces and the Estonian Defence League surrendered according to the orders of non-resistance, and were disarmed by the Red Army. Only the Estonian Independent Signal Battalion stationed at Raua Street in Tallinn began armed resistance. As the Soviet troops brought in additional reinforcements supported by six armoured fighting vehicles, the battle at Raua Street lasted for several hours until sundown. There was one dead, several wounded on the Estonian side and about 10 killed and more wounded on the Soviet side. Finally the military resistance was ended with negotiations and the Independent Signal Battalion surrendered and was disarmed.

By 18 June 1940, large-scale military operations for the occupation of Estonia, Latvia and Lithuania were complete.

== Literature ==
- Misiunas, Romuald J.; Taagepera, Rein (1993). The Baltic States, years of dependence, 1940–1990. University of California Press. ISBN 0-520-08228-1.
