= Background of the Winter War =

Finland-Soviet Union war, 1939–1940

The background of the Winter War covers the period before the outbreak of the Winter War between Finland and the Soviet Union (1939–1940), which stretches from the Finnish Declaration of Independence in 1917 to the Soviet-Finnish negotiations in 1938–1939.

Before its independence, Finland had been an autonomous grand duchy within Imperial Russia. During the ensuing Finnish Civil War, the Red Guards, supported by the Russian Bolsheviks, were defeated. Fearful of Soviet designs, in the 1920s and the 1930s, the Finns were constantly attempting to align themselves with Scandinavian neutrality, particularly regarding to Sweden. Furthermore, the Finns engaged in secret military co-operation with Estonia in the 1930s.

During the late 1920s and the early 1930s, relations with the Soviet Union had normalized to a degree, but in 1938, the Soviets feared that Finland could be used as a springboard for an invasion and so started negotiations to conclude a military agreement. Meanwhile, Soviet leader Joseph Stalin's revanchism to recover the territories of the Russian Empire that had been lost during its break up as result of the Bolshevik Revolution and the Russian Civil War made Finland an obvious target.

The nature of the Soviet demands, which included the installation of Soviet military facilities on Finnish soil, made them go nowhere.

In August 1939, the Soviet Union and Nazi Germany signed the Molotov–Ribbentrop Pact in which Eastern Europe was divided into spheres of interest. Finland belonged to the Soviet sphere of interest. In September and October 1939, the Baltic states agreed to Soviet demands that included the establishment of Soviet military bases within those countries. Stalin then turned his sights on Finland, and was confident of control being gained without great effort.

The Soviet Union demanded territories on the Karelian Isthmus, the islands of the Gulf of Finland, a military base near the Finnish capital, and the destruction of all defensive fortifications on the Karelian Isthmus. Helsinki again refused, and the Red Army attacked on 30 November 1939. Simultaneously, Stalin set up a puppet government for the Finnish Democratic Republic, headed by the Finnish communist Otto Wille Kuusinen.

== Prewar Finland ==
=== First steps of republic ===
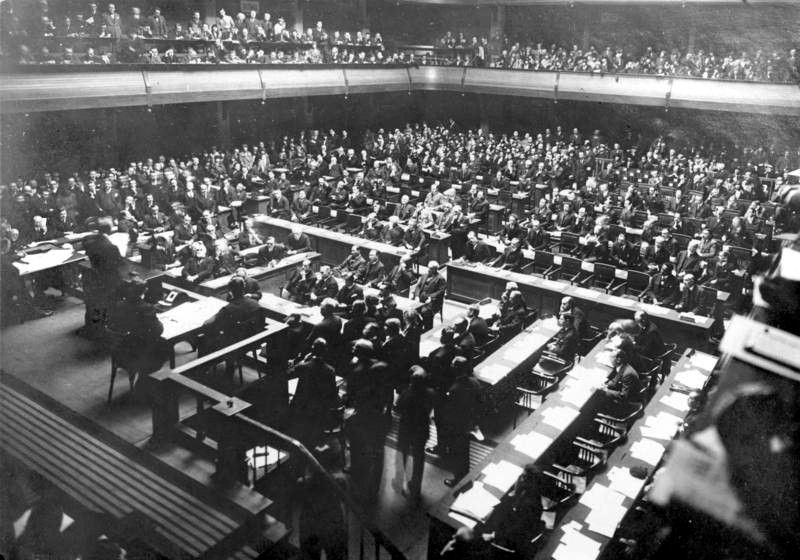
A 1926 League of Nations meeting

Finland had been the eastern part of the Swedish Empire for centuries until 1809, during the Napoleonic Wars, when the Russian Empire conquered and converted it to an autonomous buffer state in Russia to protect Saint Petersburg, the Russian capital. Finland enjoyed wide autonomy and its own Senate until the turn of the century, when Russia began attempts to assimilate Finland as part of a general policy to strengthen central government and unify the Empire by Russification. The attempts ruined relations and increased the support of Finnish movements vying for self-determination.

The outbreak of the First World War gave Finland a window of opportunity to achieve independence. The Finns sought aid from both the German Empire and the Bolsheviks to that end, and on 6 December 1917, the Finnish Senate declared the country's independence. The new Bolshevik government was weak in Russia, and soon the Russian Civil War would break out. The Bolshevik leader, Vladimir Lenin, could spare no troops or attention for Finland, and so Soviet Russia recognised the new Finnish government just three weeks after it had declared its independence. In 1918, the Finns fought a short civil war in which the Bolshevik Red Guards were armed by 7,000 to 10,000 Russian troops stationed in Finland.

After the First World War, an intergovernmental organisation, the League of Nations, was founded, whose goals included preventing war through collective security and settling disputes between countries through negotiations and diplomacy. Finland joined the League in 1920.

In the 1920s and the 1930s, Finland was politically diverse. The Communist Party of Finland was declared illegal in 1931, and the far-right Patriotic People's Movement (IKL) had won up to 14 seats in the 200-seat Finnish Parliament. The middle ground, occupied by Conservatives, Liberals, Agrarians, and the Swedish People's Party, tended to cluster with the Social Democratic Party, whose leader, Väinö Tanner, was a strong proponent of the parliamentary system.

By the late 1930s, country had its export-oriented economy growing, had solved most of its "right-wing problem", and was preparing for the 1940 Summer Olympics.

=== Finnish–German relations ===
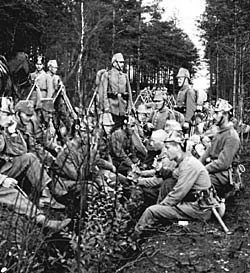
The Finnish Jäger troops during the First World War.

During the closing stages of the First World War, German-trained Finnish Jäger troops played a key role in the Finnish Civil War. The German Baltic Sea Division also intervened late in the civil war. Jäger troops were volunteers from German-influenced circles, such as university students. That participation in the Finnish struggle for independence created close ties with Germany, but after the German defeat, Scandinavian relations became more important and the main goal of Finland's foreign policy.

Finnish–German relations cooled after the National Socialist Party rose to power in Germany in 1933. Finns admired Imperial Germany, but not the radical and antidemocratic Nazi regime. Finnish conservatives did not accept the Nazis' state violence and antireligious policies. Still, there was sympathy for German aims to revise the Treaty of Versailles, but the official Finnish policy was reserved, especially after the German invasion of Czechoslovakia. Finland even recalled its ambassador for a short period.

Finnish Nazis and ultranationalist parties such as the Patriotic People's Movement achieved only minor support in several elections, especially in the aftermath of the failed Mäntsälä rebellion in 1932.

=== Finnish–Swedish relations ===
After Finland had achieved independence and ended the civil war, the other Scandinavian countries were the best candidates for a political alliance. Swedish–Finnish cooperation represented a rich vein of shared history in the culture of both nations, and the Swedish-speaking Finns had a common language with Sweden. During the civil war, however, Sweden briefly occupied Åland and then supported the local movement that wanted to secede from Finland and join the islands to Sweden. The dispute was resolved by the League of Nations in 1921, and the Åland Islands remained Finnish but were granted autonomy. Other obstacles to closer relations were the ongoing language strife on the status of the Swedish language in Finland. Sweden had also opposed the upper-class resistance movement against Russification. As a result, young Finnish men received their military training in Germany, which generated the movement. Nevertheless, relations had considerably improved before the Winter War.

Finland sought security guarantees from the League of Nations, but did not have high expectations. Sweden was one of the founding members of the League and so framed its military policies based on the League's principles of disarmament and sanctions. In the mid-1920s, the Finns established a special planning committee, the Erich Committee, which was named after its chairman, Rafael Erich, and had top politicians and officers aiming to explore possible military collaboration of Finland with other nations. The prime goal was co-operation with the Scandinavian countries, of which Sweden was the most important prospective partner.

The Finnish and Swedish militaries engaged in wide-ranging co-operation, but it was more focused on the exchange of information and defence planning for the Åland Islands than on military exercises or materiel. The Finnish objective was to commit the Swedes by establishing a military-political joint venture in the Åland Islands. If the Swedes were to undertake to assist Finland in fortifying the islands, an important and useful precedent might be set. The Government of Sweden was aware of the military co-operation, but carefully avoided committing itself to Finnish foreign policy.

=== Secret military co-operation with Estonia ===
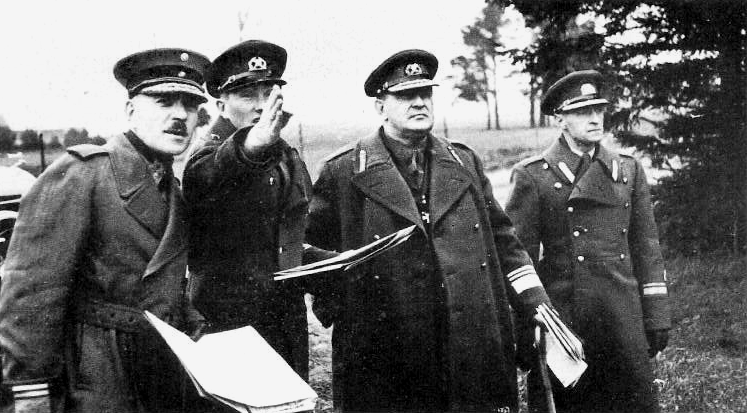
Finnish Chief of the General Staff Lennart Oesch (on the left) monitors the Estonian Army military exercises in October 1938. Estonian Chief of the General Staff Nikolai Reek stands second from the right.

Finnish–Estonian relations were closest diplomatically after the Estonian War of Independence in the 1920s. Although they cooled afterwards, military relations remained close. The Finns considered their close relations with Estonia not to exclude the Scandinavian neutrality policy, but the military relations were top secret. The countries held joint military exercises, the central aim being to prevent the Soviet Baltic Fleet from freely using its strength in the Gulf of Finland against either country.

Estonia also sought public security guarantees and signed the Baltic Entente in 1934 with Latvia and Lithuania.

=== Relations with the United Kingdom and France ===
After the collapse of Imperial Germany in November 1918, the Finns sought new political partners. The United Kingdom had been a significant trading partner since the 18th century, and the Finns worked to improve their relations for the next two decades. In the 1930s Finland purchased Thornycroft torpedo boats from the United Kingdom and refrained from buying bomber aircraft from Germany because of British protests. They instead purchased modern Bristol Blenheims, which would serve successfully during the Winter War.

Relations with France were important after the First World War and in the 1920s as France played a leading role in the new European security arrangements. In the 1930s, France started to fear the rise of Germany and initiated a rapprochement with the Soviet Union, which strained Franco–Finnish relations. However, during the Winter War, France was one of the most important suppliers of military materiel.

=== Finnish defence plans ===
The Finnish Defence Forces called their military operation plan against the Soviet Union Venäjän keskitys ("Russian Concentration") in the 1920s. In the last plan in 1934, the Finns saw two possible scenarios. In the VK1 scenario, the Soviets would mobilise all along their western border and deploy only limited forces against Finland. In that case, the Finns would make counterattacks across the border. The VK2 scenario envisaged a much more unfavourable situation. The main defense line would be on the Karelian Isthmus; the Finnish forces would repel Soviet attacks in favourable positions and destroy the enemy by counterattacks. In the Winter War, the VK2 scenario was flexible, with its basis proved to be correct, but the Finnish general staff badly underestimated the numerical superiority of the Red Army.

Finland had a limited defence budget after its independence, especially in the 1930s. Therefore, the Finnish Defence Forces lacked military materiel in almost all branches. Much of the military's materiel was outdated and proved to be unsuitable for the field during the Winter War. The material situation then improved but still lagged behind the more modern and well-equipped Red Army.

== Prewar Soviet Union ==
During Stalin's Great Terror of 1937-1938 about 11 000 officers of the Red Army and Fleet, especially high-ranking, were repressed - fired for political reasons, imprisoned or executed, including execution of 2/3 of commanders of brigades, divisions, armies. At the same time, the Red Army increased in numbers from 1.5 million in 1937 to 3.3 million in 1939. This led to a situation where officers were promoted very quickly and often commanders in middle and higher-ranks positions did not have enough experience and sufficient competence. Later some of the repressed Red Army's officers were rehabilitated following the disastrous Winter War, as the Soviet leadership realised the Red Army needed skilled commanders.

== Finnish–Soviet relations ==
=== Diplomatic relations ===
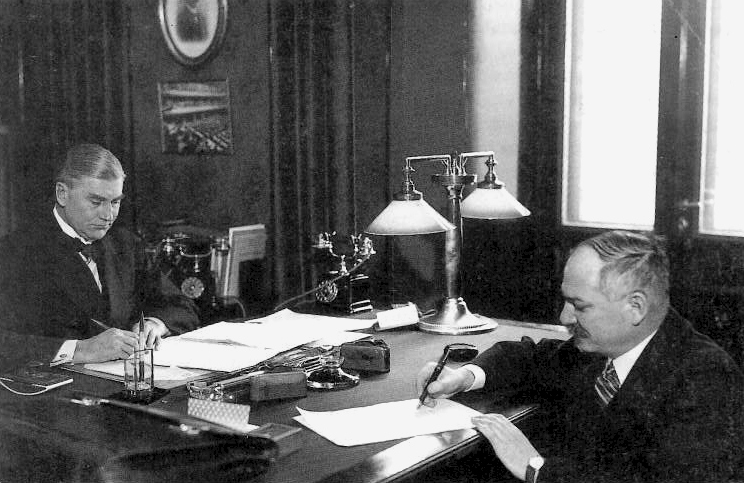
The Soviet–Finnish Non-Aggression Pact was signed in Helsinki on 21 January 1932. On the left is Finnish Foreign Minister Aarno Yrjö-Koskinen and on the right is Soviet Ambassador Ivan Maisky.

The relationship between the Soviet Union and Finland had been tense from the legacy of the two periods of Russification at the turn of the century; the failed Finnish Civil War and incursions by groups of Finnish nationalists; and the Viena expedition in 1918 and the Aunus expedition of 1919 into Russian East Karelia.

On 14 October 1920, Finland and Soviet Russia signed the Treaty of Tartu, which confirmed the new Finnish–Soviet border as the old border between the autonomous Grand Duchy of Finland and Imperial Russia proper. In addition, Finland received Petsamo, with its ice-free harbour on the Arctic Ocean. The treaty did not prevent the Finnish government from allowing volunteers to cross the border to support the East Karelian Uprising in 1921 or expatriate Finnish communists from causing disturbances in Finland. In 1923, both countries signed the Border Peace Agreement, which normalised the border.

In 1928, the Soviet Union began collectivization in Ingria. During the collectivization and the ethnic cleansing, the Soviets captured, killed and deported Ingrian peasants, which provoked widespread criticism by the Finnish media in 1930. Two years later, the nationalist Lapua Movement attempted to overthrow the Finnish government during the Mäntsälä rebellion.

Nevertheless, in the 1930s, the diplomatic climate between Finland and the Soviet Union gradually improved. In the 1920s, the Soviet Union had offered different non-aggression pacts with Finland, but they were all rejected. The offer was renewed as part of a series of agreements with countries on the Soviets' western border. In 1932, the Soviet Union signed a non-aggression pact with Finland, which was reaffirmed in 1934 for ten years.

Relations between the two countries remained largely distant, however. Foreign trade in Finland was booming, but less than 1% was with the Soviet Union. In 1934, the Soviet Union joined the League of Nations and later accepted other "progressive forces" besides communist parties. That change in Soviet attitudes, as well as Finnish internal politics, enabled a short thaw in relations in 1937.

=== Stalin and protection of Leningrad ===
After the Russian Civil War, Joseph Stalin was disappointed at the Soviet Union's inability to foment a successful revolution in Finland and at the Bolsheviks struggle against national sentiments in the Soviet Union. In 1923, Stalin proclaimed that the main danger in national relations was Great Russian chauvinism. He started the policy of korenizatsiya (indigenisation) to promote national communist cadres for every nationality.

However, in 1937, Stalin encouraged Russian chauvinism, which implied Russians to be politically and culturally superior. The Soviet diplomacy turned towards the recovery of the territories of the Russian Empire. The Soviet Union used the Communist International to announce a doctrine in which bourgeoisie equalled fascism and that communism was the natural agency of the proletariat. In practice, this meant that anything other than communism would be considered anti-Soviet and fascist. The Soviet foreign policy was a mixture of the ideology of world revolution and the traditional concerns of Russian national security.

Under Stalinism, the Soviet agriculture production collapsed, which caused famines in 1932–1933. Official output numbers of industrial production were used as propaganda to portray the Soviet Union as an economic miracle. The propaganda also used cross-border comparisons with Finland to represent it as a "vicious and reactionary Fascist clique". Finnish Marshal Mannerheim and the leader of the Finnish Social Democrat Party leader, Väinö Tanner, were particular hate figures in propaganda. Stalin gained nearly-absolute power in 1935–1936, which left only the army as self-governing, but even that changed when its officers became the target of the Great Purge in 1937–1938.

In the late 1930s, the Soviet Union was no longer satisfied with the status quo in its relations with Finland. This came as a result of a change in Soviet foreign policy, which now pursued the aim of recovering the provinces of the Russian Empire that had been lost during the chaos of the Bolshevik Revolution and the Russian Civil War. The Soviets considered that the empire had obtained an optimal balance of security and territory, and their thoughts were shaped by a historical precedent: the 1721 Treaty of Nystad, which was intended to protect Saint Petersburg from the Swedes. They used that precedent to demand the reacquisition of Finland, which would protect the Bolsheviks in Leningrad from the rising power of Germany.

In 1938, Sweden was no longer a major threat to Russia, but the Soviets had not forgotten the role that the Finnish-controlled Åland islands had played as a base of operations for the German Expeditionary Force helping the Whites during the Finnish Civil War.

== Finnish–Soviet negotiations ==
=== From 1938 to early 1939 ===
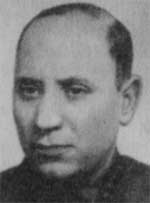
The NKVD officer Boris Yartsev, whose real name was Boris Rybkin, arranged secret negotiations with the Finnish government in 1938.

In April 1938, a junior diplomatic official, Boris Yartsev, contacted Finnish Foreign Minister Rudolf Holsti and Prime Minister Aimo Cajander and stated that the Soviets did not trust Germany and that war was considered to be possible between the two countries in which Germany might use Finland as a base for operations against the Soviet Union. The Red Army would not wait passively behind the border but would rather "advance to meet the enemy".

If Finland fought against Germany, the Soviet Union would offer all possible economic and military assistance. The Soviets would also accept the fortification of Åland islands but demanded "positive guarantees" on Finland's position.

The Finns assured Yartsev that Finland was committed to a policy of neutrality and that they would resist any armed incursion. Yartsev was not satisfied with the reply because of Finland's military weakness. He suggested that Finland could either cede or lease some islands in the Gulf of Finland along the seaward approaches to Leningrad, which Finland rejected. In the mid-1930s, the Soviet ambassador in Helsinki, Eric Assmus, and the Leningrad Bolshevik Party leader Andrei Zhdanov had presented a similar proposal.

Negotiations continued in autumn 1938. The Soviets reduced their demands: a Red Army operation was no longer an option, and the focus was shifted on securing the Gulf of Finland. The Soviets wanted to be informed of key elements of the Finnish–Estonian Gulf blockade, the secret military plan against the Baltic Fleet. Furthermore, Yartsev suggested for the Finns to fortify Suursaari Island but for the Soviets would take care of the island's defence. During the negotiations, Rudolf Holsti resigned as foreign minister but not because of the negotiations, and his place was taken by Eljas Erkko. Holsti was rather anti-German and so the resignation set off rumours that he had been forced to resign by a Finnish government that was sympathetic to the Germans, which were quickly quelled by the Finnish government.

The Finns attempted to appear impartial, and the interior ministry issued an order banning the far-right IKL. The ban was reversed by the Finnish courts as being unconstitutional. Many years later, the minister then in charge, Urho Kekkonen, admitted that it had been a simple gesture to suggest to Moscow that Finland did not harbour a German fifth column.

By the winter of 1939, the Soviets further reduced their demands and sent Boris Stein to negotiate. Stein and Erkko met five times. Erkko rejected the Soviet proposals by saying the Soviet demands would mean the end of Finnish neutrality and anger the Germans. When the chairman of the Finnish Defence Council, Carl Gustaf Emil Mannerheim, was informed of the negotiations, he said Finland should give up the Suursaari Islands since their defense would be impossible, but his arguments did not persuade the majority of the Finnish government. Stein departed Helsinki empty-handed on 6 April.

The Finns had many reasons to turn down the Soviet offer since they had started negotiations for a military co-operation with Sweden. The Finns had great hopes for the joint Finnish–Swedish defence of the Ålands islands and did not want to jeopardise their negotiations. In addition, the violent collectivisation, the Great Purge, the show trials and the executions in the Soviet Union had given the country a very bad reputation. Furthermore, most Finnish communist leaders in the Soviet Union had been executed during the purge and so the Soviets did not seem to be reliable.

The Soviet envoys sent to negotiate with Finns were officially of a relatively low rank, but as Väinö Tanner stated, the Finns assumed rightly that they represented some higher state organ of state, probably the Soviet secret police, the NKVD.

=== Ribbentrop-Molotov Pact ===
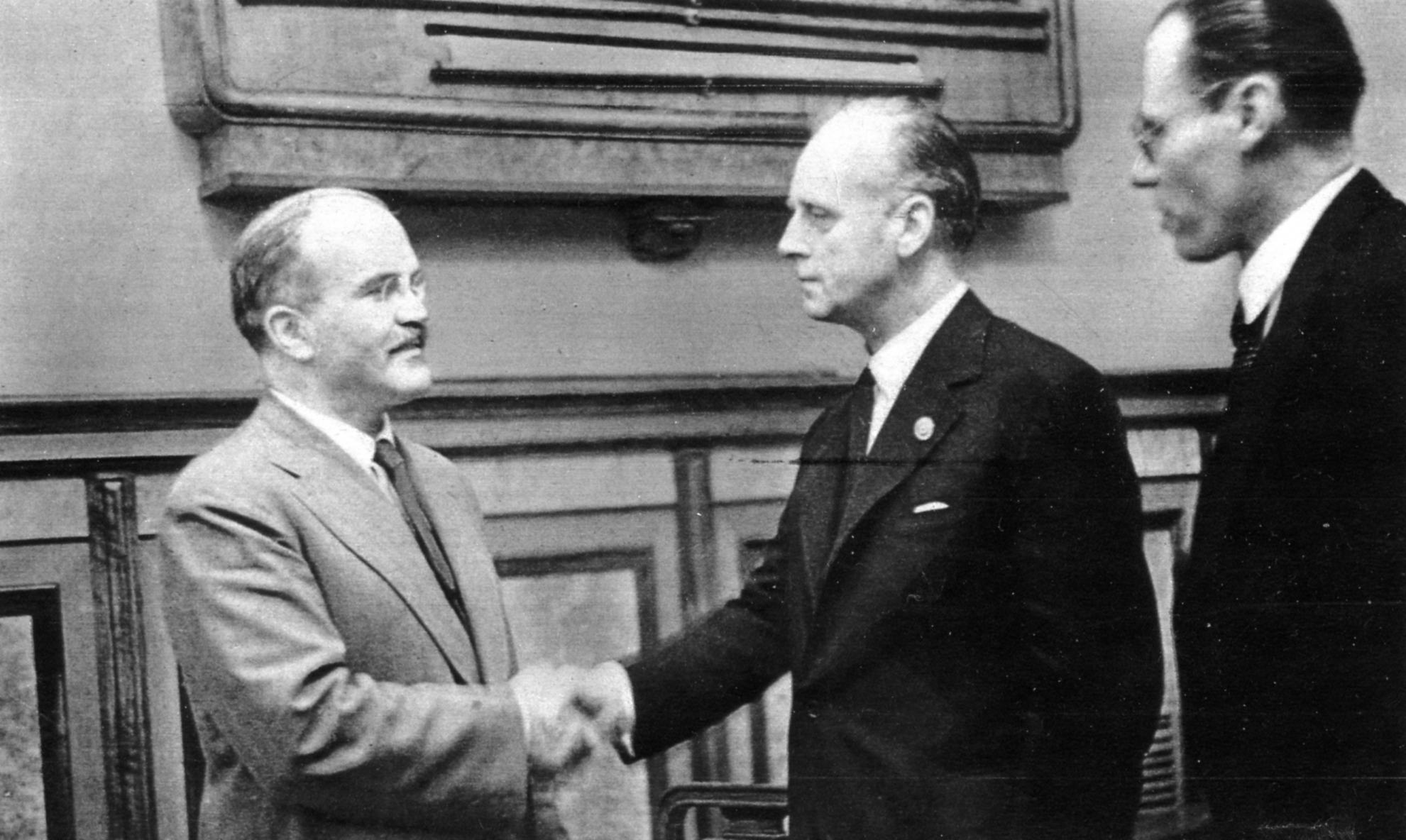
Vyacheslav Molotov and Joachim von Ribbentrop signed the non-aggression treaty between Germany and the Soviet Union in Moscow.

On 23 August 1939, the Soviet Union and Germany signed the Molotov–Ribbentrop Pact. Publicly, it was a non-aggression pact, but it included a secret protocol to divide Finland, Estonia, Latvia, Lithuania, Poland and Romania into spheres of interest, with Finland falling into the Soviet sphere.

In the immediate aftermath of the pact, the Scandinavian countries and Finland were relieved. The Germans and Soviets were now allies and so there was no German threat against the Soviet Union. However, shortly afterward, Germany invaded Poland and so Britain and France declared war against Germany. The Soviets then invaded Poland and requested for the Baltic states allow the establishment of Soviet military bases and the stationing of troops on their soil. The government of Estonia accepted the ultimatum by signing the corresponding agreement in September, and Latvia and Lithuania followed suit in October.

=== Soviet demands in late 1939 ===
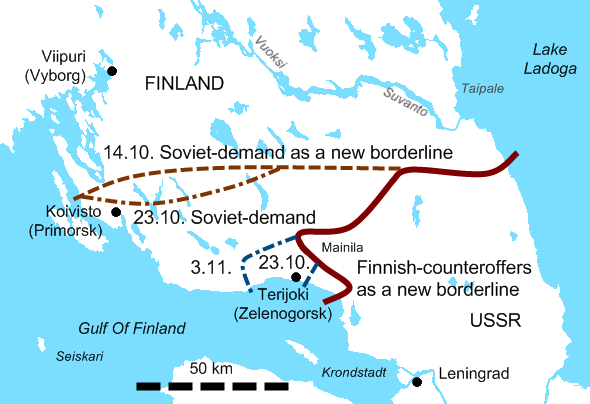
The first Soviet-demand was made for a new border line on 14 October 1939, and the Finnish made a counteroffer on 23 October. The Soviets made a new proposal, and the Finns responded on 3 November.

On 5 October, the Soviet Union invited Finland to negotiations in Moscow. The Finnish government did not hasten to comply, like the Estonian government earlier. Unlike the Baltic countries, the Finns started a gradual mobilisation under the guise of "additional refresher training". The Finnish government sent its ambassador in Stockholm, Juho Kusti Paasikivi, instead of its foreign minister, Eljas Erkko, to limit his powers as a negotiator. In Moscow, Paasikivi met Foreign Minister Vyacheslav Molotov and General Secretary Stalin.

The Soviets demanded for the frontier between the Soviet Union and Finland on the Karelian Isthmus to be moved westward to only 30 kilometres (19 mi) east of Viipuri, Finland's second-largest city, to the line between Koivisto and Lipola. In addition, the Finns would have to destroy all existing fortifications on the Karelian Isthmus. Finland also had to cede to the Soviet Union the islands of Suursaari, Tytärsaari and Koivisto in the Gulf of Finland. In the north, the Soviets demanded the Kalastajansaarento Peninsula. The Finns were to lease the Hanko Peninsula to the Soviets for 30 years and to permit the Soviets to establish a military base there. In exchange, the Soviets would cede Repola and Porajärvi from Eastern Karelia, an area twice as large as the territory demanded from the Finns. The Soviet offer divided the Finnish government. Foreign Minister Eljas Erkko and Defence Minister Juho Niukkanen rejected the offer and were backed by President Kyösti Kallio. However, Paasikivi and Mannerheim, along with Väinö Tanner, who was later appointed as one of the Finnish negotiators, wanted to accept the Soviet offer.

The Finns counted on military assistance from Sweden, and Erkko took part in the Stockholm assembly of Scandinavian leaders on 19 October. There, Erkko privately met Swedish Foreign Minister Rickard Sandler, who assured him that he would persuade the Swedish government to assist Finland during a possible war. During the actual war, however, Sandler failed in that task and so resigned.

Finland was totally isolated by a German and Soviet blockade and attempted in October to obtain arms and ammunition in absolute secrecy by enlisting the German arms dealer Josef Veltjens.

On 31 October, Molotov announced the Soviet demands in public during a session of the Supreme Soviet. The Finns made two counteroffers: one on 23 October and another on 3 November. In both offers, Finland would cede the Terijoki area to the Soviet Union, which was far less than the Soviets had demanded. The Finnish delegation returned home on 13 November and took for granted that negotiations would continue later.

== Beginning of war ==
=== Military preparations ===
The Soviet Union had started an intensive rearmament near the Finnish border in 1938 and 1939. Finnish students and volunteers had spent the late summer of 1939 improving the defensive structures across the Karelian Isthmus. On the Soviet side of the border, penal labour worked hard to add some density to sparse road and rail networks. In the summer of 1939, an important phase of Soviet planning occurred as told by Aleksandr Vasilevsky and Kirill Meretskov in their memoirs. The Supreme Council of War ordered the Commander of Leningrad Military District Merestkov to draft an invasion plan, instead of Chief of Staff Boris Shaposhnikov. The plan was adopted in July. The necessary assault troop deployments and commands were not initiated until October 1939, but operational plans made in September called for the invasion to start in November. Stalin, however, was certain that the Finns would change their minds under Soviet pressure and cede the demanded territories.

The invasion plans were laid down by the Soviet General Staff under Boris Shaposhnikov and Aleksandr Vasilevsky. The Soviet timetable was clearly and rigidly defined, with little or no margin for error. The key date was 21 December, Stalin's 60th birthday. By then, the Finnish capital Helsinki would be "freed of the Fascist oppression". Andrei Zhdanov had already commissioned a celebratory piece from Dmitri Shostakovich, Suite on Finnish Themes, to be performed as the marching bands of the Red Army would parade through Helsinki.

On 26 November, the Soviets staged the shelling of Mainila, an incident in which Soviet artillery shelled an area near the Russian village of Mainila and announced that a Finnish artillery attack had killed Soviet soldiers. The Soviet Union demanded that the Finns apologise for the incident and move their forces 20–25 km from the border. The Finns denied any responsibility for the attack, rejected the demands and called for a joint Finnish–Soviet commission to examine the incident. The Soviet Union claimed that the Finnish response was hostile and used it as an excuse to withdraw from the non-aggression pact.

=== Red Army assaults ===
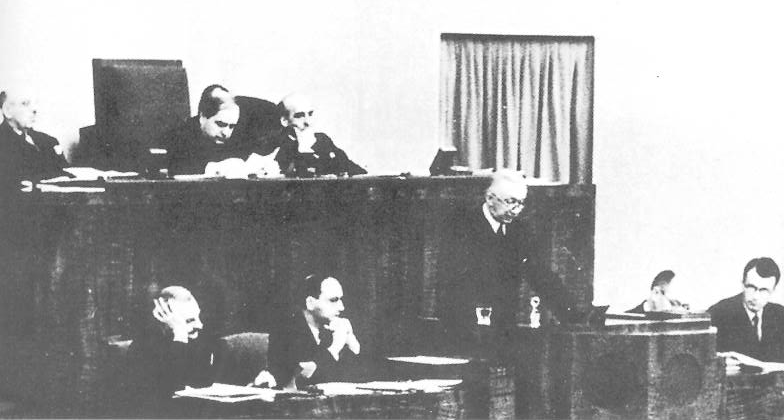
Finnish Minister Rudolf Holsti speech in front of the League of Nations General Assembly on 11 December 1939.

On 30 November, Soviet forces invaded Finland with 27 divisions, totalling 630,000 men, bombed civilian boroughs of Helsinki and quickly reached the Mannerheim Line. The shelling of Mainila was a casus belli of the Soviet Union as it had withdrawn from non-aggression pacts on 28 November. Germany had staged a similar incident to have an excuse to start war against Poland. The Soviet Union would later use the Orzeł incident to challenge the neutrality of Estonia.

Later, the Finnish statesman Paasikivi commented that the Soviet attack, without a declaration of war, violated three non-aggression pacts: the Treaty of Tartu of 1920; the Non-aggression Pact between Finland and the Soviet Union, which was signed 1932 and again in 1934; and the Charter of the League of Nations. The invasion was judged illegal by the League of Nations, which expelled the Soviet Union on December 14.

After the Soviet attack, Mannerheim was appointed as commander-in-chief of the Finnish Defence Forces. Furthermore, the Finnish government changed, with Risto Ryti appointed as new prime minister and Väinö Tanner as foreign minister.

On 1 December, the Soviet Union created a new government for Finland, to be called the Finnish Democratic Republic. It was a puppet regime headed by Otto Wille Kuusinen and became known as the "Terijoki government" since the village of Terijoki was the first place to be "liberated" by the Red Army. The puppet regime was unsuccessful, and it was quietly discarded during the winter of 1940.

Contrary to Soviet expectations, from the beginning of the conflict, nearly all working-class Finns stood behind the legal government. That national unity against the Soviet invasion was later called the "spirit of the Winter War".

== See also ==
- Causes of World War II
- Timeline of the Winter War
- Background of the occupation and annexation of the Baltic states

== Sources ==
- Conquest, Robert (2008) [1990]. The Great Terror: A Reassessment. Oxford: Oxford University Press. ISBN 978-0-19-531700-8.
- Courtois, Stéphane (1999). The Black Book of Communism: Crimes, Terror, Repression. Cambridge, MA: Harvard University Press. ISBN 978-0-674-07608-2.
- Chubaryan, Alexander O.; Shukman, Harold (2002). Stalin and the Soviet–Finnish war 1939–40. London: Frank Cass. ISBN 0-7146-5203-2.
- Chulos, Chris J.; Piirainen, Timo, eds. (2000). The Fall of an Empire, the Birth of a Nation. Helsinki: Ashgate. ISBN 1-85521-902-6.
- Edwards, Robert (2006). White Death: Russia's War on Finland 1939–40. London: Weidenfeld & Nicolson. ISBN 978-0-297-84630-7.
- Leskinen, Jari; Juutilainen, Antti, eds. (1999). Talvisodan pikkujättiläinen (in Finnish) (1st ed.). Werner Söderström Osakeyhtiö. p. 976. ISBN 951-0-23536-9.
- Manninen, Ohto (1994). Talvisodan salatut taustat (in Finnish). Porvoo: Kirjaneuvos. ISBN 952-9052-51-0.
- Polvinen, Tuomo; Heikkilä, Hannu; Immonen, Hannu (1992). J. K. Paasikivi. Valtiomiehen elämäntyö 2 : 1918–1939 (in Finnish). Porvoo, Helsinki, Juva: WSOY. ISBN 951-0-18122-6.
- Rayfield, Donald (2005) [2004]. Stalin and His Hangmen. Penguin books. ISBN 978-0-14-100375-7.
- Tanner, Väinö (1950). The Winter War: Finland against Russia 1939-1940 (1st ed.). California: Stanford University Press. ISBN 9780804704823.
- Trotter, William R. (2002) [1991]. The Winter war: The Russo–Finno War of 1939–40 (5th ed.). New York (Great Britain: London): Workman Publishing Company (Great Britain: Aurum Press). ISBN 1-85410-881-6. "First published in the United States under the title A Frozen Hell: The Russo–Finnish Winter War of 1939–40"
- Veltjens, Klaus (2009). Seppl: a step ahead of politics. CreateSpace. ISBN 978-1-4421-4582-5.
- Suvenirov, Oleg (1998). Трагедия РККА 1937—1938 [Tragedy of the Red Army 1937–1938] (in Russian). TERRA. ISBN 530-0-0222-09.
