= Karl Selter =

Estonian politician (1898–1958)

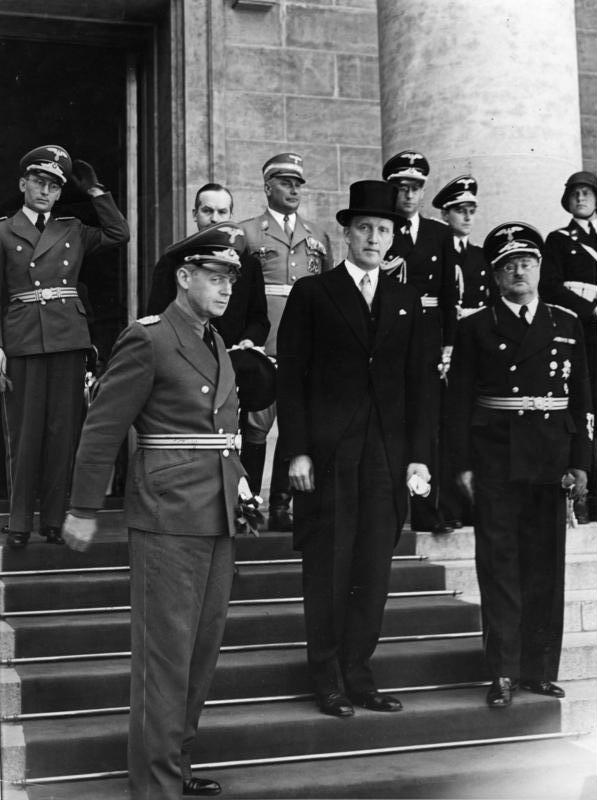
Karl Selter with Joachim von Ribbentrop on the occasion of the signing of the German-Estonian Non-Aggression Pact on 7 June 1939.

Karl Selter (24 June 1898 in Koeru, Estonia – 31 January 1958 in Geneva, Switzerland) was an Estonian politician who served as Minister of Economic Affairs from 1933 to 1938 and as Minister of Foreign affairs from 1938 to 1939. He is remembered mostly for his signing of a non-aggression and mutual assistance treaty with the Soviet leaders in Moscow in September 1939, following an ultimatum from the Soviet Foreign Minister, Vyacheslav Molotov on 24 September.

Estonia gained sovereignty when the Soviet Union was powerless, but you “don’t think that this can last… forever… The Soviet Union is now a great power whose interests need to be taken into consideration. I tell you—the Soviet Union needs enlargement of her security guarantee system; for this purpose she needs an exit to the Baltic Sea … I ask you, do not compel us to use force against Estonia.“

— Molotov to Selter

This treaty gave the Soviet army the right to set up military bases in Estonia, and it significantly reduced Estonia's sovereignty until Estonia was occupied and annexed into the Soviet Union between June and August 1940. Selter left Estonia in November 1939, resigning both as Foreign Minister and as a member of Parliament, and moved to Geneva, Switzerland as a diplomat. After the subsequent German occupation of Estonia between 1941 and 1944, and the Soviet re-occupation in 1944, he stayed in Switzerland as an exiled diplomat and politician.

Preceded by Friedrich Akel	Minister of Foreign Affairs of Estonia; 1938–1939	Succeeded by Ants Piip
