= Basis Nord =

German WWII naval base near Murmansk

Coordinates: 69°25′N 32°26′E

Basis Nord in the Soviet Union

Basis Nord ("Base North") was a secret naval base of Nazi Germany's Kriegsmarine in Zapadnaya Litsa, west of Murmansk provided by the Soviet Union. The base was part of a partnership that developed between Germany and the Soviet Union following German-Soviet Non-Aggression treaty of 1939, along with a broad economic agreement of 1940.

In 1939, the Soviet Union agreed to supply the base location to Germany for the purpose of supporting U-boats and commerce raiding. Germany sent supply ships that were anchored in the bay, but the base was never used by Kriegsmarine fighting vessels. Germany's April 1940 invasion of Norway thereafter rendered the base unnecessary.

In 2008, Basis Nord featured in a prominent BBC–PBS investigative history series, World War II Behind Closed Doors: Stalin, the Nazis and the West, and a book of the same name by Laurence Rees in 2009.

== Background ==
During the summer of 1939, after conducting negotiations with both a British–French group and Germany regarding potential military and political agreements, the Soviet Union chose Germany, resulting in an August 19 German–Soviet Trade Agreement providing for the trade of certain German military and civilian equipment in exchange for Soviet raw materials and the August 23 Molotov–Ribbentrop Pact, which contained secret protocols dividing the states of Northern and Eastern Europe into German and Soviet "spheres of influence."

One week after the Molotov–Ribbentrop Pact's signing, the partition of Poland commenced with the German invasion of western Poland, followed by the Soviet Union's invasion of Eastern Poland on September 17, which included coordination with German forces.

== Negotiations ==
In late 1939, both countries began discussions of creating a larger economic agreement than the 1939 German–Soviet Trade Agreement. From the start of those negotiations, the Soviet Union made clear that it was willing to exchange its strategic maritime position for technology. The Soviets were willing to provide a northern base to the Germans, but not a busy seaport because it would provide an open indication of Soviet assistance of Germany, indicating that it was a co-belligerent.

In October, the Soviets initially offered to provide a base to the west of Murmansk, which the Germans noted lacked anchorage shelter and facilities. The Soviets modified the offer to give the then undeveloped Zapadnaya Litsa, in the Motovsky Gulf, on the Litsa Fjord at the westernmost point of the Kola Peninsula, which the Germans accepted.

== Base operations ==
=== Need for secrecy ===
While it made secret agreements with Germany for territorial division and military aid, the Soviet Union attempted to maintain a thin cloak of neutrality. Several clandestine options for the Soviet supply of German raiding ships that operated at the edge of international law were considered, such as having the German ships feign the capture of Soviet supply vessels as a "prize" then releasing them after the Germans retrieved supplies, or placing supplies at a transshipment point where the Germans would later retrieve them.

The base at Zapadnaya Litsa, called "Basis Nord", had advantages with regard to secrecy. It was surrounded by Russian territory and closed to all foreign and Soviet domestic shipping, so that no one could see operations taking place. Its entrance also prevented observation from the open sea.

=== Initial base conditions ===
Germany knew that overt German fortification of Basis Nord was a political impossibility. The base at that time was entirely undeveloped, with no communications by rail or road and lacked access to potable water. Murmansk (120 kilometers away) had access to White Sea–Baltic Canal, but when the Germans arrived, Murmansk had not yet been developed and Gulag forced labor was still present constructing Soviet facilities.

Germany initially procured the necessary supplies for its U-boats to use at the base and sent them first to Murmansk. It used the merchant ships Cordillera (12,055 GRT)), Phoenicia (4,124 GRT)) and Sachsenwald (639 GRT) for these purposes. All three ships had been interned at Murmansk since the beginning of the war. Cordillera returned to Murmansk almost immediately in December 1939, and then traveled to Hamburg in February 1940.

The Soviet Union's Northern Fleet headquarters was informed by Moscow that the Germans were to be able to use the base to support their blockade of the British Isles. However, the British submarine HMS Salmon sank U-36, the initial submarine Germany sent to scout Basis Nord, in the Norwegian Sea, though the British did not know U-36's mission. U-38 later accomplished the scouting task despite interference by the Soviet torpedo boats and coast guard ships.

=== Rumors ===
In December 1939, western European media began to publish reported rumors of a northern German submarine base operating in the Soviet Union. Danish newspaper Nationaltidende, French magazine Paris-soir and a French radio station reported rumors of a German submarine base, though they incorrectly identified the location. Germany dismissed the reports as unfounded rumors. Similar rumors surfaced in March 1940 in the Stockholm Daily Press.

=== Invasion of Norway ===
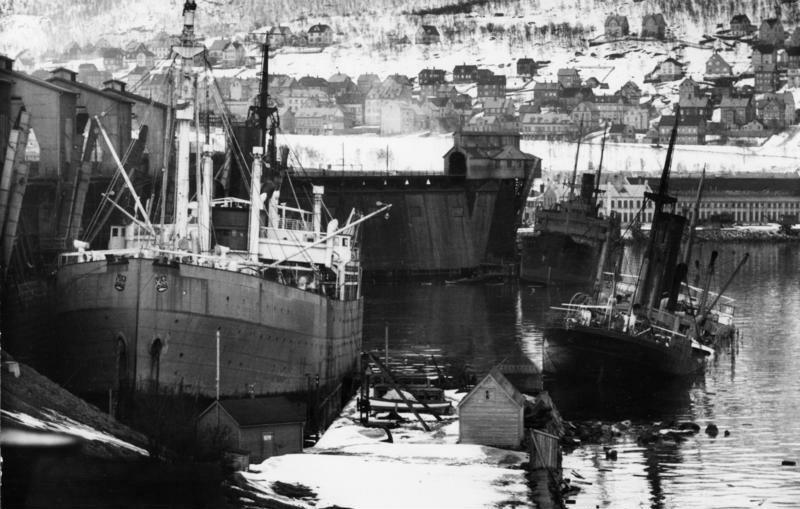
Former whaler "Jan Wellem" (left) ran aground after Battles of Narvik 10–13 April 1940 Narvik. Later it was salvaged.

In April 1940, Germany invaded Norway to attain a base for naval raiding in the North Atlantic and to secure shipments of iron-ore from Sweden through the port of Narvik. Although the ships used were not launched from Basis Nord, the 11,776-long-ton (13,189-short-ton) supply ship Jan Wellem, important for Narvik operations was sent from Basis Nord. No German U-boats or surface warships were supplied out of Basis Nord.

On 1 May 1940, the Soviets offered a better anchorage point for Basis Nord at nearby Iokanga Bay. However, the German capture of Norway decreased the need for operations at Basis Nord, and it became more important as a symbol of cooperation than a base for significant operation. In April 1940, the Soviet Union withdrew its promises given with regard to Basis Nord.
