= Molotov–Ribbentrop Pact negotiations =

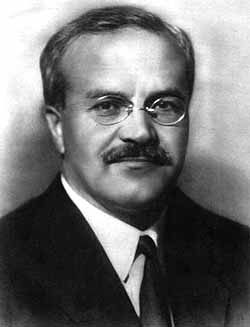
Vyacheslav Molotov

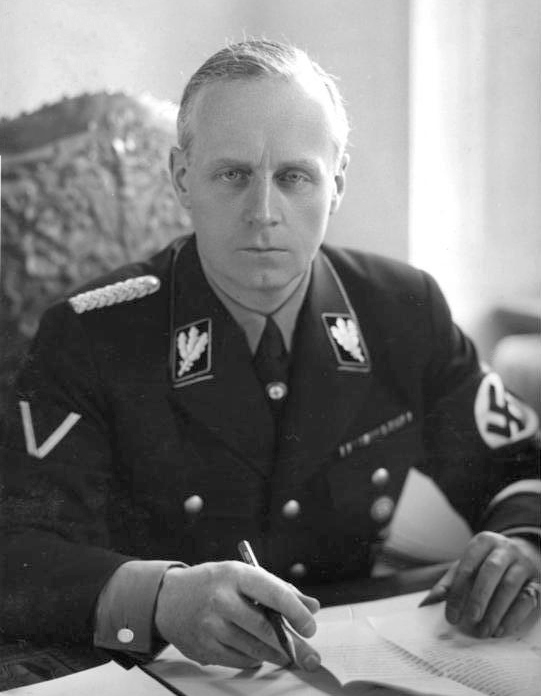
Joachim von Ribbentrop

The Molotov–Ribbentrop Pact was an August 23, 1939, agreement between the Soviet Union and Nazi Germany colloquially named after Soviet foreign minister Vyacheslav Molotov and German foreign minister Joachim von Ribbentrop. The treaty renounced warfare between the two countries. In addition to stipulations of non-aggression, the treaty included a secret protocol dividing several eastern European countries between the parties.

Before the treaty's signing, the Soviet Union conducted negotiations with the United Kingdom and France regarding a potential "Tripartite" alliance. Long-running talks between the Soviet Union and Germany over a potential economic pact expanded to include the military and political discussions, culminating in the pact, along with a commercial agreement signed four days earlier.

== Background ==
=== After World War I ===
After the Russian Revolution of 1917, Soviet Russia ended its fight against the Central Powers, including Germany, in World War I by signing the Treaty of Brest-Litovsk in which Russia agreed to cede sovereignty and influence over parts of several countries in Eastern Europe. Most of those countries became ostensibly-democratic republics after Germany's defeat and its signing of an armistice in the autumn of 1918. With the exception of Belarus and Ukraine, those countries also became independent. However, the Treaty of Brest-Litovsk lasted only eight-and-a-half months, when Germany renounced it and broke off diplomatic relations with Russia.

Before World War I, Germany and Russia had long shared a trading relationship. Germany. a relatively small country with few natural resources, lacks natural supplies of several key raw materials that are needed for economic and military operations. Since the late 19th century, it had relied heavily upon Russian imports of raw materials. Germany had imported 1.5 billion Reichsmarks of raw materials and other goods annually from Russia before the war.

In 1922, the countries signed the Treaty of Rapallo, renouncing territorial and financial claims against each other. Both countries pledged neutrality in the event of an attack against each other with the 1926 Treaty of Berlin. Imports of Soviet goods to Germany fell after World War I, but after trade agreements signed between the two countries in the mid-1920s, trade had increased to 433 million Reichsmarks per year by 1927.

In the early 1930s, that relationship fell as the more isolationist Stalinist regime asserted power and the abandonment of post-war military control decreased Germany's reliance on Soviet imports and so Soviet imports fell to 223 million Reichsmarks in 1934.

=== Mid-1930s ===
In the mid-1930s, the Soviet Union made repeated efforts to re-establish closer contacts with Germany. The Soviets sought chiefly to repay debts from earlier trade with raw materials, and Germany sought to rearm, and both countries signed a credit agreement in 1935. The rise to power of the Nazi Party increased tensions between Germany, the Soviet Union and other countries with ethnic Slavs, who were considered Untermenschen by Nazi racial ideology. The Nazis were convinced that ethnic Slavs were incapable of forming their own state and accordingly had to be ruled by others. Moreover, the anti-semitic Nazis associated ethnic Jews with both communism and international capitalism, both of which they opposed. Consequently, the Nazis believed that Soviet Slavic Untermenschen were being ruled by "Jewish Bolshevik" masters. Two primary goals of Nazism were to eliminate Jews and to seek Lebensraum ("living space") for ethnic Aryans to the east. In 1934, Hitler spoke of an inescapable battle against "pan-Slav ideals", the victory in which would lead to "permanent mastery of the world", but he stated that they would "walk part of the road with the Russians, if that will help us".

Despite the political rhetoric, the Soviets attempted in 1936 to seek closer political ties to Germany along with an additional credit agreement, but Hitler rebuffed the advances and did not want to seek closer political ties even though a 1936 raw material crisis prompted Hitler to decree a Four-Year Plan for rearmament "without regard to costs". In the 1930s, two Foreign Office cipher clerks, Ernest Holloway Oldham and John Herbert King, sold the British diplomatic codes to the NKVD, which allowed the Soviets to read British diplomatic traffic. However, the Soviet code-breakers were completely unable to break the German codes that were encrypted by the Enigma machine. The fact that Soviet intelligence-gathering activities in Germany were performed by the underground Communist Party of Germany, which was full of Gestapo informers, rendered most Soviet espionage in Germany ineffective. Stalin's decision to execute or imprison most of the German Communist emigres living in the Soviet Union during the Great Purge finished off almost all of the Soviet espionage in the Reich.

Tensions grew further after Germany and Fascist Italy supported the Spanish Nationalists in the Spanish Civil War in 1936, and the Soviets supported the Spanish Republic, which had many communists. In November 1936, Soviet-German relations sank further after Germany and Japan entered the Anti-Comintern Pact, which was purportedly directed against the Communist International, but it contained a secret agreement that either side would remain neutral if the other became involved with the Soviet Union. In November 1937, Italy also joined the Anti-Comintern Pact.

=== Late 1930s ===
The Moscow Trials of the mid-1930s seriously undermined Soviet prestige in the West. The Soviet purges in 1937 and 1938 made a deal less likely by disrupting the already-confused Soviet administrative structure that was necessary for negotiations and gave Hitler the belief that the Soviets were militarily weak.

The Soviets were not invited to the Munich Conference on Czechoslovakia. The Munich Agreement, which followed, marked the start of the dissolution of Czechoslovakia in 1938 by a partial German annexation. That was part of the appeasement of Germany.

After the German need for military supplies after the Munich Agreement and the Soviet demand for military machinery increased, talks between both countries occurred from late 1938 to March 1939. The Soviet Third Five-Year Plan would require massive new infusions of technology and industrial equipment. An autarkic economic approach or an alliance with Britain were impossible for Germany and so closer relations with the Soviet Union were necessary if only for economic reasons. Germany could then supply only 25% of its petroleum needs, and without its primary petroleum source, in the United States, during a war, it would have to look to Russia and Romania. Germany suffered the same natural shortfall and supply problems for rubber and metal ores, needed to produce hardened steel for war equipment, and Germany relied on Soviet supplies or transit by using Soviet railways. Finally, Germany also imported 40% of its fat and oil food requirements, which would grow if Germany conquered nations that were also net food importers. Germany thus needed Soviet imports of Ukrainian grains or Soviet transshipments of Manchurian soybeans. Moreover, an anticipated British blockade in the event of war and the end of petroleum from the United States would create massive shortages for Germany in a number of key raw materials.

On 31 March 1939, British Prime Minister Neville Chamberlain in the British House of Commons made the famous "guarantee" of Poland that Britain would go to war in the defense of Polish independence but its integrity. On 28 April 1939, Hitler in a speech to the Reichstag renounced the German–Polish Non-Aggression Pact. Britain and France had made statements guaranteeing the sovereignty of Poland and on April 25 signed a military alliance with Poland, which refused to be associated with a four-power guarantee involving the Soviets.

== Initial talks ==
=== Potential for Soviet-German talk expansion ===
Germany and the Soviet Union discussed an economic deal throughout early 1939. For months, Germany had secretly hinted to Soviet diplomats that it could offer better terms for a political agreement than could Britain and France. On March 10, Hitler in his official speech proclaimed that directly. That same day, Stalin, in a speech to the Eighteenth Congress of the All-Union Communist Party, characterised the Western nations' actions regarding Hitler as moving away from "collective security" and toward "nonintervention" with the goal being to direct fascist aggression anywhere but against themselves. After the Congress concluded, the Soviet press mounted an attack on both France and Britain. Stalin believed that the British and the French governments were engaging in a conspiracy to direct Germany towards the east and to cause a German-Soviet war. In the aftermath of the Great Terror, the maxim ugadat, ugodit, utselet ("sniff out, suck up, survive") dominated the Soviet regime, and the NKVD tended to provide Stalin with intelligence that fitted his preconceptions, which thus reinforced what he already believed.

Rudolf von Scheliha, the First Secretary at the German embassy in Warsaw, had been working as a Soviet spy since 1937 and kept the Kremlin well informed about the state of German-Polish relations, and it was intelligence provided by him that let the Soviets know that Hitler was seriously considering invading Poland from March 1939 onward and gave the orders for an invasion of Poland in May. On 13 March 1939, Scheliha reported to Moscow that he had a conversation with one of Ribbentrop's aides, Peter Kleist, who told him Germany would probably attack Poland sometime that year. In his reports to Moscow, Scheliha made it clear that the Auswärtiges Amt had attempted to reduce Poland to a German satellite state during the winter of 1938-1939, but the Poles had refused to play that role. The chief Soviet spy in Japan, Richard Sorge, had meanwhile reported to Moscow that the German attempt to convert the Anti-Comintern Pact into a military alliance had failed, as Germany wanted the alliance to be directed against Britain as well, but Japan wanted it to only be directed against the Soviet Union. On 5 April 1939, Baron Ernst von Weizsäcker, the State Secretary (second man) at the Auswärtiges Amt, ordered Count Hans-Adolf von Moltke, the German ambassador to Poland, not to engage in talks with the Poles under any conditions over resolving the dispute over the Free City of Danzig (now Gdańsk). as the Danzig issue was just a pretext for war, and he was afraid if talks began, the Poles might actually agree to Danzig rejoining Germany, which would deprive the Reich of its pretext for war. Scheliha, in turn, informed Moscow that the Auswärtiges Amt would not engage in talks for a diplomatic solution to the Danzig issue, which indicated that German policy towards Poland was not a policy with a high risk of war, but it was a policy aimed at causing a war.

On April 7, a Soviet diplomat visited the German Foreign Ministry stating that there was no point in continuing the German-Soviet ideological struggle and that the countries could conduct a concerted policy. Ten days later, Soviet Ambassador Alexei Merekalov met Ernst von Weizsäcker, the State Secretary at the Auswärtiges Amt and presented him a note requesting speedy removal of any obstacles for fulfillment of military contracts signed between Czechoslovakia and the Soviet Union before the former was occupied by Germany. According to German accounts, at the end of the discussion, the ambassador stated, "there exists for Russia no reason why she should not live with us on a normal footing. And from normal the relations might become better and better", but other sources admit that it could be an exaggeration or an inaccurate recounting of the ambassador's words.

Immediately, the Soviet ambassador had been withdrawn to Moscow and never returned to Germany. According to Ulam, future conversations on the topic in Berlin were believed to continue with lower-level officials working under the cover of a Soviet trade mission. Starting on 14 April 1939 and continuing right up to August 1939, the German embassy in London received anonymous copies of British diplomatic cables to and from Moscow, which detailed London's attempts to have the Soviets join the anti-German "peace front". The Foreign Office's diplomatic telegrams were selectively edited to make it sound like that Anglo-Soviet relations were far better than they actually were and that the talks were going much better than they really were. The German ambassador to Britain, Herbert von Dirksen, judged the cables credible and passed them along in his reports to Berlin. As the Germans could not break the Foreign Office's codes, and the Abwehr had no agent with access to the Foreign Office's codes, the intercepted cables were not the work of German intelligence. In fact, the cables that sent to the German embassy in London were the work of the NKVD, which had broken the British codes and was seeking to pressure the Reich to come to terms with the Soviet Union.

=== Tripartite talks begin ===
In mid-March 1939, the Soviet Union, Britain and France traded a flurry of suggestions and counterplans regarding a potential political and military agreement. The Soviet Union feared the West and the possibility of a "capitalist encirclements", had little faith either that war could be avoided or in the Polish Army and wanted guaranteed support for a two-pronged attack on Germany.

Britain and France believed that war could still be avoided and that the Soviet Union, weakened by the Great Purge, could not serve as a main military participant. France, as a continental power, was more anxious for an agreement with the Soviets than was Britain, and was more willing to make concessions and more aware of the dangers of an agreement between the Soviet Union and Germany. On April 17, Soviet Foreign Minister Maxim Litvinov outlined a French–British–Soviet mutual assistance pact between the three powers for five to ten years, including military support, if any of the powers was the subject of aggression.

== May changes ==
=== Litvinov dismissal ===
On May 3, Stalin replaced Foreign Minister Maxim Litvinov with Vyacheslav Molotov, which significantly increased Stalin's freedom to manoeuvre in foreign policy. The dismissal of Litvinov, whose Jewish ethnicity was viewed disfavourably by Nazi Germany, removed an obstacle to negotiations with Germany.

Stalin immediately directed Molotov to "purge the ministry of Jews". Litvinov's prior attempts to create an anti-fascist coalition, association with the doctrine of collective security with France and Britain, and pro-Western orientation by the standards of the Kremlin made his dismissal indicate the existence of a Soviet option of rapprochement with Germany. Likewise, Molotov's appointment served as a signal to Germany that the USSR was open to offers.

The dismissal also signaled to France and Britain the existence of a potential negotiation option with Germany. One British official wrote that Litvinov's disappearance also meant the loss of an admirable technician or shock-absorber, and Molotov's "modus operandi" was "more truly Bolshevik than diplomatic or cosmopolitan". However, Stalin sent a double message since Molotov appointed Solomon Lozovsky, a Jew, as one of his deputies. Émile Naggiar, the French ambassador in Moscow, reported to Bonnet that Molotov wanted a full military alliance as "the new commissar now intends to obtain more extensive advantages".

=== May tripartite negotiations ===
Although informal consultations started in late April, the main negotiations between the Soviet Union, Britain and France began in May. At a meeting in May 1939, the French Foreign Minister Georges Bonnet told the Soviet Ambassador to France, Jakob Suritz, that Bonnet was willing to support turning over all of eastern Poland to the Soviet Union, regardless of Polish opposition, if that was the price of an alliance with Moscow.

=== German supply concerns and potential political discussions ===
In May, German war planners also became increasingly concerned that without Soviet supplies, Germany would need to find massive substitute quantities of 165,000 tons of manganese and almost 2 million tons of oil per year. In the context of further economic discussions, on May 17, the Soviet ambassador told a German official that he wanted to restate "in detail that there were no conflicts in foreign policy between Germany and Soviet Russia and that therefore there was no reason for any enmity between the two countries". Three days later, on May 20, Molotov told Count Friedrich Werner von der Schulenburg, the German ambassador in Moscow that he no longer wanted to discuss only economic matters, and that it was necessary to establish a "political basis", which German officials saw an "implicit invitation." Due to information provided by Scheliha, the Soviets knew that Germany did not want a diplomatic solution to the Danzig crisis and had decided to invade Poland in the summer of 1939.

On May 26, German officials feared that a potential positive result might come from the Soviets talks regarding proposals by Britain and France. On May 30, fearing potential positive results from a British and French offer to the Soviets, Germany directed its diplomats in Moscow that "we have now decided to undertake definite negotiations with the Soviet Union." The ensuing discussions were channelled through the economic negotiation because the economic needs of both sides were substantial and because close military and diplomatic connections had been severed in the mid-1930s, which left those talks as the only means of communication.

== Baltic sticking point and German rapprochement ==
=== Mixed signals ===
The Soviets sent mixed signals thereafter. In his first main speech as Soviet Foreign Minister on May 31, Molotov criticized an Anglo-French proposal, stated that the Soviets did not "consider it necessary to renounce business relations with countries like Germany" and proposed to enter a wide-ranging mutual assistance pact against aggression. However, Soviet Commissar for Foreign Trade Anastas Mikoyan argued on June 2 to a German official that Moscow "had lost all interest in these economic negotiations' as a result of earlier German procrastination". By June 1939, information sold by Scheliha let the Soviets know that Germany was committed to an invasion of Poland later that year.

=== Tripartite talks progress and Baltic moves ===
On June 2, the Soviet Union insisted that any mutual assistance pact should be accompanied by a military agreement describing in detail the military assistance that the Soviets, the French and the British would provide. The same day, the Soviet Union also submitted a modification to a French and British proposal, which specified the states that would be given aid in the event of "direct aggression"; they included Belgium, Greece, Turkey, Romania, Poland, Estonia, Latvia and Finland. Five days later, Estonia and Latvia signed non-aggression pacts with Germany, which created suspicions that Germany had ambitions in a region through which it could attack the Soviet Union.

=== British attempt to stop German armament ===
On June 8, the Soviets had agreed that a high-ranking German official could come to Moscow to continue the economic negotiations, which occurred in Moscow on July 3. Thereafter, official talks were started in Berlin on July 22.

Meanwhile, hoping to stop the German war machine, in July, Sir Horace Wilson, the British government's Chief Industrial Adviser and one of Chamberlain's closest friends, conducted talks in London with Ambassador Herbert von Dirksen and Helmuth Wohlthat, an economist of the Four-Year Plan Organisation who was in London as part of the German delegation to the International Whaling Conference for an economic agreement. Acting on his own, Robert Hudson approached Wohlthat and Dirksen regarding a potential plan to bail out the debt-ridden German economy at the cost of 1 billion pounds in exchange for Germany ending its armaments program. The British press broke a story on the talks, and Germany eventually rejected the offer. As the Soviets were reading the British diplomatic codes in 1939, the Kremlin was well informed about the general thrust of the British policy to build a "peace front" meant to "contain" Germany.

=== Tripartite talks regarding "indirect aggression" ===
After weeks of political talks that began after the arrival of Central Department Foreign Office head William Strang, on July 8, the British and French submitted a proposed agreement to which Molotov added a supplementary letter. Talks in late July stalled over a provision in Molotov's supplementary letter stating that a political turn to Germany by the Baltic states constituted "indirect aggression", which Britain feared might justify Soviet intervention in Finland and the Baltic states or push those countries to seek closer relations with Germany, but France was less resistant to the supplement. On July 23, France and Britain agreed with the Soviet proposal to draw up a military convention specifying a reaction to a German attack.

=== Beginning of German-Soviet political negotiations ===
On July 18, the Soviet trade representative Yevgeniy Barbarin visited Karl Schnurre and said that the Soviets would like to extend and intensify German-Soviet relations. On July 25, the Soviet Union and Germany were very close to finalising the terms of a proposed economic deal. On July 26, over dinner, the Soviets accepted a proposed three-stage agenda, which included first the economic agenda and "a new arrangement which took account of the vital political interests of both parties." On July 28, Molotov sent a first political instruction to the Soviet ambassador in Berlin that finally opened the door to a political détente with Germany.

Germany had learned about the military convention talks before the July 31 British announcement and was skeptical that the Soviets would reach a deal with Britain and France during those planned talks in August. On August 1, the Soviet ambassador stated that two conditions must be met before political negotiations could begin: a new economic treaty and the cessation of anti-Soviet attacks by German media, and German officials immediately agreed with them. On August 2, Soviet political discussions with France and Britain were suspended when Molotov stated they could not be restarted until progress was made in the scheduled military talks.

=== Addressing past hostilities ===
On August 3, German Foreign Minister Joachim von Ribbentrop told Soviet diplomats that "there was no problem between the Baltic and the Black Sea that could not be solved between the two of us". The Germans discussed prior hostility between the nations in the 1930s. They addressed the common ground of anti-capitalism and stated "there is one common element in the ideology of Germany, Italy and the Soviet Union: opposition to the capitalist democracies", "neither we nor Italy have anything in common with the capitalist west" and "it seems to us rather unnatural that a socialist state would stand on the side of the western democracies". They explained that their prior hostility toward Soviet Bolshevism had subsided with the changes in the Comintern and the Soviet renunciation of a world revolution. Astakhov characterized the conversation as "extremely important."

== Final negotiations ==
=== Finalising economic agreement ===
In August, as Germany scheduled its invasion of Poland on August 25 and prepared for war with France, German war planners estimated that with an expected British naval blockade, if the Soviet Union became hostile, Germany would fall short of its war mobilization requirements of oil, manganese, rubber and foodstuffs by huge margins. Every internal German military and economic study had argued that Germany was doomed to defeat without at least Soviet neutrality. On August 5, Soviet officials stated that the completion of the trading credit agreement was the most important stage that could be taken in the direction of further such talks.

By August 10, the countries worked out the last minor technical details to make their economic arrangement all but final, but the Soviets delayed signing that agreement for almost ten days until they were sure that they had reached a political agreement with Germany. The Soviet ambassador explained to German officials that the Soviets had begun their British negotiations "without much enthusiasm" when they felt Germany would not "come to an understanding", and the parallel talks with the British could not be simply broken off when they had been initiated after "mature consideration". On August 12, Germany received word that Molotov wished to further discuss these issues, including Poland, in Moscow.

=== Tripartite military talks begin ===
The Soviets, British and French began military negotiations in August. They were delayed until August 12 because the British military delegation, which did not include Strang, took six days to make the trip since it travelled in a slow merchant ship, The City of Exeter. That undermined the Soviets' confidence in British resolve. In a show of Allied solidarity, the French military mission led by General Joseph Doumenc was to travel with the British delegation, and there were a number of protests from French Ambassador Charles Corbin when he learned that the military mission would travel on The City of Exeter, which moved at only 13 knots. Ivan Maisky, the Soviet ambassador in London, complained to Admiral Reginald Drax, who was to command the British military mission, about the decision to travel on The City of Exeter instead of taking the first flight to Moscow, but Drax claimed that he and the other members of the mission needed a ship because of all the excess baggage that they were bringing with them.

Lord Halifax vetoed the idea of the mission travelling from London to Leningrad on a fast-moving destroyer or cruiser under the grounds that a British warship in the Baltic Sea would be too provocative to Germany during the Danzig crisis. Maisky reported to Moscow about the decision to use The City of Exeter: "Staggering. Chamberlain is still up to his tricks. He does not need a tripartite pact, he needs negotiations on a pact, in order to sell more dearly this card to Hitler". The Anglo-French mission arrived in Leningrad on 10 August and in Moscow via train on 11 August. On August 14, the question of Poland was raised by Kliment Voroshilov for the first time by requesting British and French pressure on the Poles to agree to allow the Soviet Army transit rights in Poland. The Polish government feared that the Soviet government sought to annex disputed territories, the Eastern Borderlands, which had been received by Poland in 1920 after the Treaty of Riga, which ended the Polish–Soviet War. The British and the French contingent communicated the Soviets' concern over Poland to their home offices and told the Soviet delegation that they could not answer that political matter without their governments' approval.

Meanwhile, Molotov spoke with Germany's ambassador in Moscow on August 15 about the possibility of "settling by negotiation all outstanding problems of Soviet–German relations". The discussions included the possibility of a Soviet-German non-aggression pact, the fates of the Baltic states and potential improvements in Soviet-Japanese relations. Molotov stated that "should the German foreign minister come here", those issues "must be discussed in concrete terms". Within hours of receiving word of the meeting, Germany sent a reply stating that it was prepared to conclude a 25-year non-aggression pact, "guarantee the Baltic States jointly with the Soviet Union" and exert influence to improve Soviet-Japanese relations. The Soviets responded positively but stated that a "special protocol" was required, "defining the interests" of the parties. Germany replied that in contrast to the British delegation in Moscow at that time without Strang, Ribbentrop would personally travel to Moscow to conclude a deal.

In the Soviet-British-French talks, the Anglo-Franco military negotiators were sent to discuss "general principles", rather than details. On August 15, the British contingent was instructed to move more quickly to bring the military talks to a conclusion and thus were permitted to give Soviet negotiators confidential British information. The British contingent stated that Britain currently had only six army divisions but in the event of a war they use employ 16 divisions initially, followed by a second contingent of 16 divisions, far less than the 120 Soviet divisions. French negotiators stated that they had 110 divisions available. In discussions on August 18–19, the Poles informed the French ambassador that they would not approve Red Army troops operating in Poland.

=== Delayed signing of commercial agreement ===
After Soviet and German officials in Moscow first finalised the terms of a seven-year German-Soviet Commercial Agreement, German officials became nervous that the Soviets were delaying its signing on August 19 for political reasons. When Tass published a report that the Soviet-British-French talks had become snarled over the Far East and "entirely different matters", Germany took that as a signal that there was still time and hope to reach a Soviet-German deal. Hitler himself sent out a coded telegram to Stalin to state that because "Poland has become intolerable", Stalin must receive Ribbentrop in Moscow by August 23 at the latest to sign a pact. Controversy surrounds a related alleged Stalin's speech on August 19, 1939 asserting that a great war between the Western powers was necessary for the spread of world revolution. Historians debate whether that speech ever actually occurred.

At 2:00 a.m. on August 20, Germany and the Soviet Union signed a commercial agreement, dated August 19. It provided for the trade of certain German military and civilian equipment in exchange for Soviet raw materials. The agreement covered "current" business, which entailed a Soviet obligation to deliver 180 million Reichsmarks in raw materials in response to German orders, and Germany would allow the Soviets to order 120 million Reichsmarks for German industrial goods. Under the agreement, Germany also granted the Soviet Union a merchandise credit of 200 million Reichsmarks over seven years to buy German manufactured goods at an extremely-favourable interest rate.

=== Soviets adjourn tripartite military talks and strike deal with Germany ===
After the Poles' resistance to pressure, Voroshilov proposed on August 21 the adjournment of the military talks with the British and French by using the excuse that the absence of the senior Soviet personnel at the talks interfered with the autumn manoeuvres of the Soviet forces, but the primary reason was the progress that was made in the German-Soviet negotiations.

That same day, August 21, Stalin has received assurance would approve secret protocols to the proposed non-aggression pact that would grant the Soviets land in Poland, the Baltic states, Finland and Romania. That night, with Germany nervously awaiting a response to Hitler's August 19 telegram, Stalin replied at 9:35 p.m. that the Soviets were willing to sign the pact and that he would receive Ribbentrop on August 23. The Pact was signed sometime in the night between August 23–24.

== Signing of pact ==
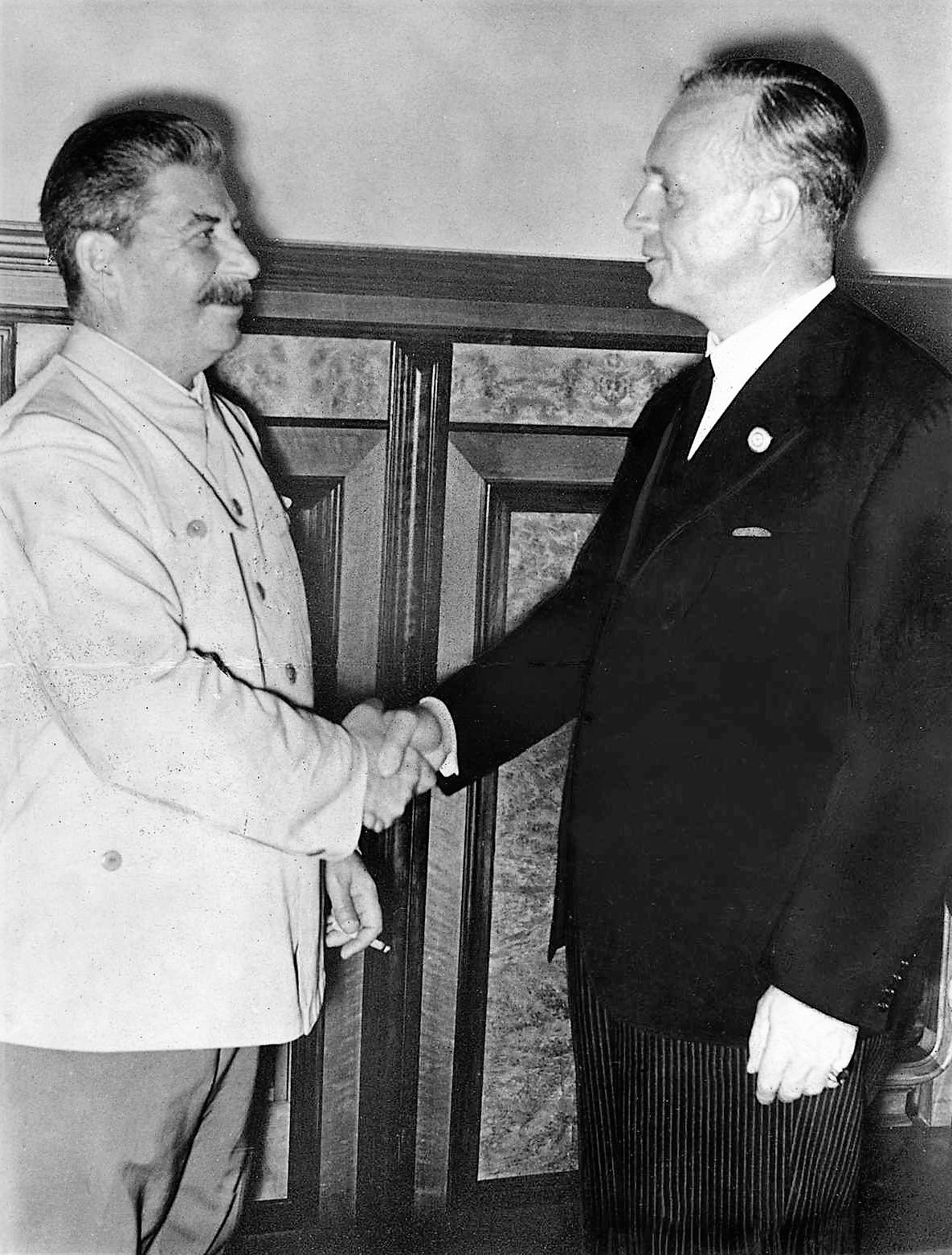
Stalin and Ribbentrop at the signing of the Pact

On August 24, a ten-year non-aggression pact was signed with provisions that included consultation, arbitration if either party disagreed, neutrality if either went to war against a third power and no membership of a group "which is directly or indirectly aimed at the other." Most notably, there was also a secret protocol to the pact according to which the states of Northern and Eastern Europe were divided into German and Soviet "spheres of influence".

Poland was to be partitioned in the event of its "political rearrangement". The Soviets promised the eastern part of Poland that was primarily populated with Ukrainians and Belarusians, in case of its dissolution, and additionally Latvia, Estonia and Finland. Bessarabia, which was part of Romania, was given a free hand for the Soviets by Germany.

Ribbentrop and Stalin enjoyed warm conversations at the signing, exchanged toasts and further discussed the prior hostilities between the countries in the 1930s. Ribbentrop stated that Britain had always attempted to disrupt Soviet–German relations, was "weak" and "wants to let others fight for her presumptuous claim to world dominion." Stalin concurred by adding, "If England dominated the world, that was due to the stupidity of the other countries that always let themselves be bluffed". Ribbentrop stated that the Anti-Comintern Pact was directed against not the Soviet Union but the Western democracies, "frightened principally the City of London [the British financiers] and the English shopkeepers", and he stated that Berliners had joked that Stalin would yet join the Anti-Comintern Pact himself. Stalin proposed a toast to Hitler, and Stalin and Molotov repeatedly toasted the German nation, the Molotov–Ribbentrop Pact and Soviet-German relations. Ribbentrop countered with a toast to Stalin and a toast to both countries' relations. As Ribbentrop left, Stalin took him aside and stated that the Soviet government took the new pact very seriously and that he would "guarantee his word of honor that the Soviet Union would not betray its partner."

The news of the pact was met with utter shock and surprise by government leaders and media worldwide, most being aware only of the British–French–Soviet negotiations that had taken place for months.

== Events during pact's operation ==
=== Immediate dealings with Britain ===
The day after the Pact was signed, the French and British military negotiation delegation urgently requested a meeting with Voroshilov. On August 25, Voroshilov told them, "In view of the changed political situation, no useful purpose can be served in continuing the conversation". That day, Hitler told the British ambassador to Berlin that the pact with the Soviets prevented Germany from facing a two-front war and changed the strategic situation from that in World War I and that Britain should accept his demands regarding Poland. Surprising Hitler, Britain signed a mutual-assistance treaty with Poland that day, which caused Hitler to delay the planned August 26 invasion of western Poland.

=== Division of eastern Europe ===
On September 1, 1939, the German invasion of its agreed-upon portion of western Poland started World War II. On September 17, the Red Army invaded eastern Poland and occupied the Polish territory assigned to it pact, and co-ordination of Soviet and German forces in Poland followed. Eleven days later, the secret protocol of the Molotov-Ribbentrop Pact was modified to allot Germany a larger part of Poland and cede most of Lithuania to the Soviet Union.

After a Soviet attempt to invade Finland faced stiff resistance, the combatants signed an interim peace granting the Soviets approximately 10% of Finnish territory. The Soviet Union also sent troops into Lithuania, Estonia and Latvia. Puppet governments in all three Baltic countries requested admission to the Soviet Union, which soon occurred.

=== Further dealings ===
Germany and the Soviet Union agreed to an intricate trade pact on February 11, 1940, which was over four times larger than the one that both countries had signed in August 1939 by providing for millions of tons of shipment to Germany of oil, foodstuffs and other key raw materials in exchange for German war machines and other equipment. That was followed by a January 10, 1941, agreement setting several ongoing issues, including border specificity, ethnic migrations and further commercial deal expansion.

Discussions in the fall and the winter of 1940 and 1941 ensued regarding the potential entry of the Soviet Union as the fourth member of the Axis powers. The countries never came to an agreement on that issue.

== Aftermath ==
Nazi Germany terminated the pact with its invasion of the Soviet Union in Operation Barbarossa on June 22, 1941. After the launch of the invasion, the territories gained by the Soviet Union by the pact were lost in a matter of weeks. Within three weeks, the Soviets, attempting to defend against large German advances, had suffered 750,000 casualties, and lost 10,000 tanks and 4,000 aircraft. Within six months, the Soviet military had suffered 4.3 million casualties, and the Germans had captured three million Soviet prisoners-of-war, two million of whom would die in German captivity by February 1942. German forces had advanced 1,050 mi (1,690 km) and maintained a linearly-measured front of 1,900 mi (3,058 km).

== Post-war commentary regarding negotiations ==
=== Reasons behind signing pact ===
Until mid-July, an alliance with Britain and France was the preferred solution for the USSR: for example, on 28 June 1939 Molotov rejected Schulenburg's call for better Soviet-German relations, and on 1 July Pravda published and article emphasizing the British determination to resist aggression. The atmosphere became much worse by 17 July, possibly due to Germany suggesting the German-Soviet trade agreement and Neville Chamberlain's rejection of an idea of alliance with the Soviet Union. As A.J.P. Taylor had remarked,

If British diplomacy seriously aspired to alliance with Soviet Russia in 1939, then the negotiations towards this end were the most incompetent transactions since Lord North lost the American colonies …

There is no consensus among historians regarding the reasons that prompted the Soviet Union to sign the pact with Germany. According to Ericson, the opinions "have ranged from seeing the Soviets as far-sighted anti-Nazis, to seeing them as reluctant appeasers, as cautious expansionists, or as active aggressors and blackmailers". Edward Hallett Carr argued that it was necessary to join a non-aggression pact to buy time since the Soviet Union was not in a position to fight a war in 1939 and needed at least three years to prepare. He stated: "In return for non-intervention Stalin secured a breathing space of immunity from German attack." According to Carr, the "bastion" created by means of the Pact, "was and could only be, a line of defense against potential German attack". An important advantage, projected by Carr, was that "if Soviet Russia had eventually to fight Hitler, the Western Powers would already be involved".

However, during the last decades, that view has been disputed. The historian Werner Maser stated that "the claim that the Soviet Union was at the time threatened by Hitler, as Stalin supposed,... is a legend, to whose creators Stalin himself belonged". In Maser's view, "neither Germany nor Japan were in a situation [of] invading the USSR even with the least perspective [sic] of success", which Stalin must have known.

The extent to which the Soviet Union's territorial acquisitions may have contributed to preventing its fall and thus a German victory in the war remains a factor in evaluating the pact. Soviet sources point out that the German advance eventually stopped just a few kilometres away from Moscow and so the role of the extra territory might have been crucial in such a close call. Others postulate that Poland and the Baltic countries played the important role of buffer states between the Soviets and the Germans and that the pact was a precondition not only for the Germans' invasion of Western Europe but also their invasion of the Soviet Union. The military aspect of moving from established fortified positions on the Stalin Line into undefended Polish territory could also be seen as one of the causes of rapid disintegration of Soviet armed forces in the border area during the German 1941 campaign, as the newly-constructed Molotov Line was unfinished and could not provide Soviet troops with the necessary defence capabilities.

Historians have debated whether Stalin was planning an invasion of German territory in the summer of 1941. Most historians agreed that the geopolitical differences between the Soviet Union and the Axis made war inevitable and that Stalin had made extensive preparations for war and exploited the military conflict in Europe to his advantage. A number of German historians such as Andreas Hillgruber, Rolf-Dieter Müller, and Christian Hartmann have debunked the claim that Operation Barbarossa was a pre-emptive strike, but they have also acknowledged the Soviets were aggressive to their neighbours.

=== Documentary evidence of early Soviet-German rapprochement ===
In 1948, the U.S. State Department published a collection of documents that had been recovered from the Foreign Office of Nazi Germany, that formed a documentary base for studies of Nazi-Soviet relations. The collection contains the German State Secretary's account on a meeting with Soviet Ambassador Merekalov. The memorandum reproduces the following ambassador's statement: "there exists for Russia no reason why she should not live with us on a normal footing. And from normal the relations might become better and better". According to Carr, that document is the first recorded Soviet step in the rapprochement with Germany.
The next documentary evidence is the memorandum on the May 17 meeting between the Soviet ambassador and the German Foreign Office official, and the ambassador "stated in detail that there were no conflicts in foreign policy between Germany and Soviet Russia and that therefore there was no reason for any enmity between the two countries".
The third document is the summary of the May 20 meeting between Molotov and German Ambassador Friedrich-Werner von der Schulenburg. According to the document, Molotov told the German ambassador that he no longer wanted to discuss only economic matters and that it was necessary to establish a "political basis", which German officials saw as an "implicit invitation".
The last document is the German State Office memorandum on the telephone call made on June 17 by Bulgarian Ambassador Purvan Draganov. In German accounts of Draganov's report, Astakhov explained that a Soviet deal with Germany better suited the Soviets than one with Britain and France, but from the Bulgarian ambassador, it "could not be ascertained whether it had reflected the personal opinions of Herr Astakhov or the opinions of the Soviet Government".

The documentary evidence of an early Nazi-Soviet rapprochement was questioned by Geoffrey Roberts, who analyzed Soviet archival documents that had been declassified and released on the eve of the 1990s. Roberts found no evidence that the alleged statements quoted by the Germans had ever been made, and he came to the conclusion that the German archival documents cannot serve as evidence for the existence of a dual policy during first half of 1939. According to him, no documentary evidence exists that the Soviets responded to or made any overtures to the Germans "until the end of July 1939 at the earliest".

=== Litvinov's dismissal and Molotov's appointment ===
Many historians note that the dismissal of Foreign Minister Litvinov, whose Jewish ethnicity was viewed unfavourably by Nazi Germany, removed a major obstacle to negotiations between it and the Soviets.
Carr, however, has argued that the Soviet Union's replacement of Litvinov with Molotov on May 3, 1939 indicated not an irrevocable shift towards alignment with Germany but rather Stalin's way of engaging in hard bargaining with the British and the French by appointing a tough negotiator, Molotov, to the Foreign Commissariat. Albert Resis argued that the replacement of Litvinov by Molotov was both a warning to Britain and a signal to Germany.

Derek Watson argued that Molotov could get the best deal with Britain and France because he was not encumbered with the baggage of collective security and could more easily negotiate with Germany. Geoffrey Roberts argued that Litvinov's dismissal helped the Soviets with British-French talks, because Litvinov doubted or maybe even opposed such discussions.

== See also ==
- Timeline of the Molotov–Ribbentrop Pact
