= German–Soviet Commercial Agreement (1940) =

1940 agreement between Germany and the Soviet Union

- Signed: 11 February 1940
- Location: Moscow, Soviet Union
- Expiration: 22 June 1941
- Signatories: Anastas Mikoyan; N. Baburin; K. Ritter; K. Schnurre
- Parties: Soviet Union; Nazi Germany
- Languages: German, Russian

Full text
- German–Soviet Commercial Agreement (1940) at Wikisource

The 1940 German–Soviet Commercial Agreement (Russian: Хозяйственное соглашение между Союзом Советских Социалистических Республик и Германией; also known as Economic Agreement of 11 February 1940 Between the German Reich and the Union of Soviet Socialist Republics) was an economic arrangement between the Soviet Union and Nazi Germany signed on 11 February 1940. In it the Soviet Union agreed in the period from 11 February 1940 to 1941, in addition to the deliveries under German–Soviet Commercial Agreement, signed on 19 August 1939 to deliver commodities (oil, raw materials, and grain) to the value of 420 to 430 million Reichsmarks.

A policy on the transit through Soviet territory of third countries' commodities purchased by Germany was later agreed. The countries followed up the agreement and resolved other issues with the 10 January 1941 German–Soviet Border and Commercial Agreement. In June 1941 Germany invaded the Soviet Union in violation of the 1939 Molotov–Ribbentrop Pact, and all economic agreements between the two countries ended.

Between January 1940 and date of the German invasion, the USSR exported goods of a total estimated value of 597.9 million Reichsmarks to Germany. German deliveries amounted to 437.1 million Reichsmarks. The agreements continued German–Soviet economic relations and resulted in the delivery of large amounts of raw materials to Germany, including over 820,000 metric tons (900,000 short tons; 810,000 long tons) of oil, 1,500,000 metric tons (1,700,000 short tons; 1,500,000 long tons) of grain and 130,000 metric tons (140,000 short tons; 130,000 long tons) of manganese ore.

The Soviet Union received the incomplete Admiral Hipper-class naval cruiser Lützow, the plans to the battleship Bismarck, information on German naval testing, "complete machinery for a large destroyer", heavy naval guns, other naval gear, and samples of 30 of Germany's latest warplanes, including the Bf 109 and 110 fighters and Ju 88 and Do 215 bombers. The Soviet Union also received oil and electric equipment, locomotives, turbines, generators, diesel engines, ships, machine-tools, and samples of Germany artillery, tanks, explosives, chemical-warfare equipment, and other items.

Raw materials that Germany had obtained from the Soviets through the 1940 agreement supported the German war effort against the Soviet Union from 1941. In particular, the German stocks of rubber and grain would not have sufficed to support the invasion of the USSR if the Soviets had not already exported these products to Germany.

== Background ==
=== Prior to 1939 ===
The German–Soviet Economic Agreement of 12 October 1925 formed the contractual basis for trade relations with the Soviet Union. In addition to the normal exchange of goods, German exports to the Soviet Union from the very beginning utilized a system negotiated by the Soviet Trade Mission in Berlin by which the Soviet Union was granted credits for the financing of additional orders in Germany, for which the Trade Mission had to negotiate bills of exchange payable in Reichsmarks.

Trade with Soviet Union, promoted by the first credit operations, led to a brisk exchange of goods, which reached its highest point in 1931. In the early 1930s, however, Soviet imports decreased as the more isolationist Stalinist regime asserted power and dwindling adherence to the disarmament requirements of the Treaty of Versailles decreased Germany's reliance on Soviet imports. In addition, the rise to power of the Nazi Party increased tensions between Germany and the Soviet Union.

In the mid-1930s, the Soviet Union made repeated efforts to reestablish closer contacts with Germany. The Soviets chiefly sought to repay debts from earlier trade with raw materials, while Germany sought to rearm, and the countries signed a credit agreement in 1935. the "Fourth Credit Operation, Special Transaction of 1935", was concluded on 4 April 1935. It placed at the disposal of the Soviet Union until 30 June 1937 200 million Reichsmarks of credits to be repaid during the period from 1940 to 1943. The Soviet Union utilized 183 million Reichsmarksthis of this credit. The preceding credit Operations were liquidated, except for five million Reichsmarks, which were to be repaid in 1938.

Tensions increased because of Germany's support for the Fascist Spanish Nationalists in the Spanish Civil War, while the Soviet Union supported the partially socialist-led Spanish Republic government.

Economic reconciliation was hampered even further by political tension after the Anschluss in mid-1938 and Hitler's increasing hesitance to deal with the Soviet Union. Soviet exports to Germany fell to 47.4 million Reichsmarks in 1937 (approximately one fifth of the 1934 total) and 52.8 million Reichsmarks in 1938. In short, the important trading relationship between the countries that existed in the 1920s essentially collapsed with Hitler's rise to power.

Throughout these years, the bulk of the imports from the Soviet Union consisted of raw materials equivalent to foreign exchange. For example, in 1937, 95 percent of imports from the Soviet Union were raw materials. Germany lacked natural supplies of several key raw materials needed for economic and military operations. In 1938, two-thirds of German oil supply came from the United States and Latin America, while 52 percent of German steel used imported iron ore originating from Sweden. Germany's imports by countries (in Million of Reichsmarks) were as follows:

	Soviet Union	Poland & Danzig	Finland	Estonia	Latvia	Lithuania	United States	United Kingdom	South American countries
1936	93.2	74.0	46.1	13.8	33.2	9.1	232.2	N/A	536.5
1937	65.1	80.7	70.1	23.7	45.7	17.2	281.9	308.6	850.3
1938	47.4	109.4	88.6	24.0	43.5	27.6	404.6	282.7	809.7

=== Resource requirements ===
Because of the lack of German natural resources, German planners in May 1939 feared that a cessation of Swedish trade would cut key iron ore supplies. In addition, were Russian supplies cut off, German planners estimated that they would need to find substitutes for approximately 150,000 metric tons (170,000 short tons; 150,000 long tons) of manganese and almost 1.8 million metric tons (2 million short tons; 1.8×10^{6} long tons) of oil per year. Germany already faced severe rubber shortages because of British and Dutch refusals to trade with Germany. On 8 May, German officials produced new planning figures estimating that Germany possessed oil stocks totaling only 3.1 months of usage.

In August, as Germany planned to invade Poland and prepared for an eventual war with France, German war planners estimated that, with an expected British naval blockade, if the Soviet Union became hostile, Germany would fall short of its war mobilization requirements by 9.0 million metric tons (9.9 million short tons; 8.8×10^{6} long tons) of oil and 240,000 metric tons (260,000 short tons; 240,000 long tons) of manganese. At that time, Germany possessed only two to three months of rubber stocks and three to six months of oil stocks. Because of the expected naval blockade, the Soviet Union would become the only potential supplier for many items.

=== Events leading up the negotiations ===
During mid-1939, the Soviet Union discussed the entry of a political and military pact with contingents representing France and Britain, while also discussing a potential deal with Germany.

In early August, Germany and the Soviet Union finalized the terms for an economic agreement, but the Soviets delayed executing that agreement until the terms of the political agreement with Germany were finalized. On 19 August, Germany and the Soviet Union signed a trade agreement providing for the trade of certain German military and civilian equipment in exchange for Soviet raw materials. The agreement provided that Germany would accept 200 million Reichsmark in new orders over seven years with an effective interest rate of 4.5 percent and would export 60 million Reichsmark in "current business" (trade covered by earlier agreements), 180 million Reichsmark in "new business" and another 200–300 million Reichsmark in repayment for old and new credits. The credit line was to be used during the next two years for purchase of capital goods (factory equipment, installations, machinery and machine tools, ships, vehicles, and other means of transport) in Germany and was to be paid off by means of Soviet material shipment from 1946 onward.

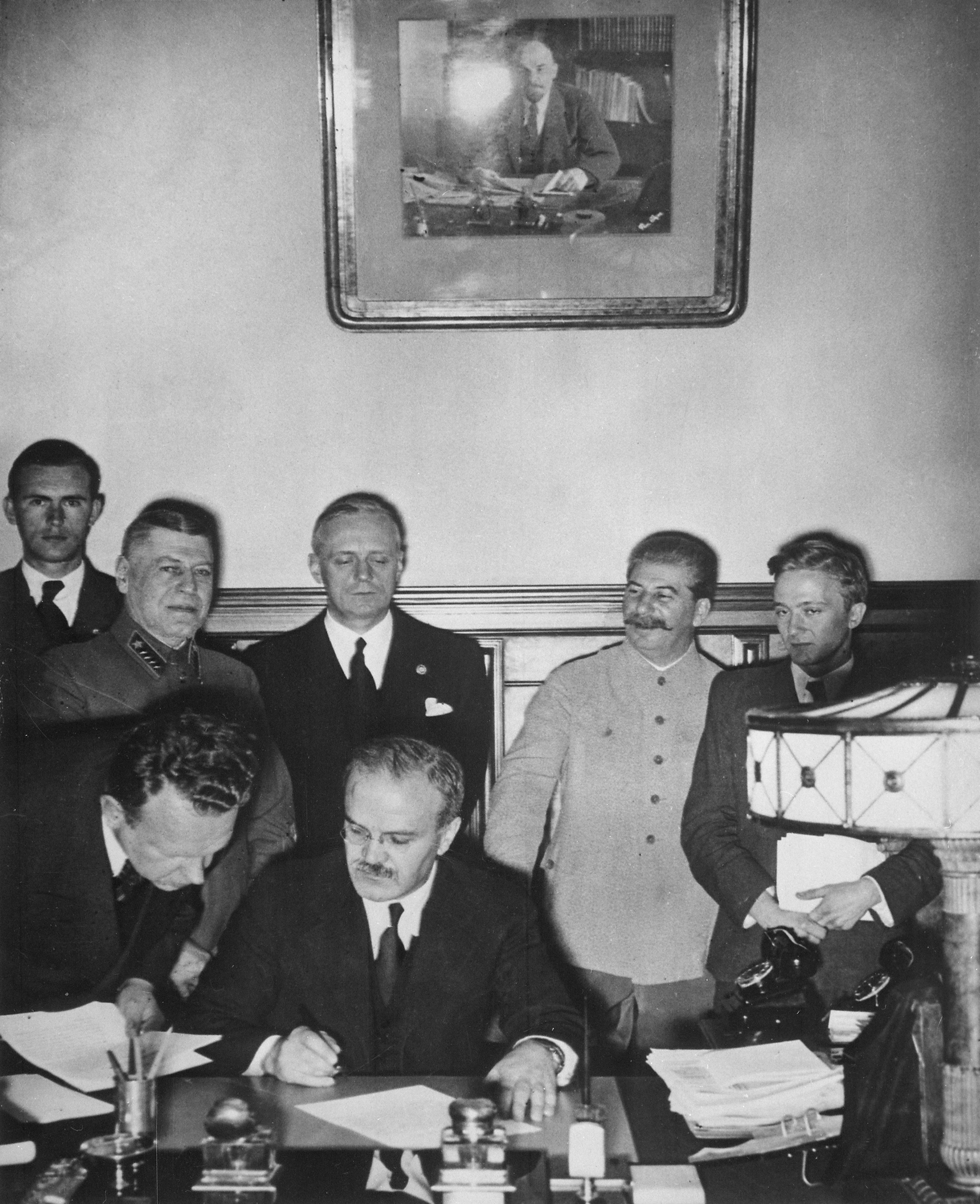
Molotov signs the Pact, flanked by Ribbentrop and Stalin

Four days later, the Soviet Union and Germany signed the Molotov–Ribbentrop Pact, an agreement of mutual non-aggression between the parties. The Molotov–Ribbentrop Pact contained secret protocols dividing the states of Northern and Eastern Europe into German and Soviet "spheres of influence". At the time, Stalin considered the trade agreement to be more important than the non-aggression pact. One week after the Molotov–Ribbentrop Pact, the partition of Poland commenced with the German invasion of western Poland.

On 17 September, the Red Army invaded eastern Poland and occupied the Polish territory which held up to 70 percent of Poland's prewar oil production. In October 1939, three German trade partners—Estonia, Latvia, and Lithuania—were given no choice but to sign a so-called Pact of defense and mutual assistance which permitted the Soviet Union to station troops in them.

== Negotiations ==
=== German plans and expectations ===
Hitler's pressing for a German invasion of Poland in 1939 placed tremendous strain on the German war machine, which had been gradually gearing up after the Treaty of Versailles restrictions for total war in 1942 or 1943. The German navy was critically short of maritime and military assets and did not achieve full mobilization until 1942. Even Germany's quick victory in Poland strained its 1939 military resources, as Germany possessed only six weeks of munitions supplies and no considerable manpower reserve. Germany's lack of raw materials meant that it had to seek increased supply from outside. However, the British blockade left Germany increasingly desperate for materials. The only remaining state capable of supplying Germany with the oil, rubber, manganese, grains, food fats, and platinum it needed was the Soviet Union.

Germany needed more of an economic alliance for raw materials than the economic partnership that the 19 August 1939 agreement provided. At the same time, the Soviet demands for manufactured goods, such as German machines, was increasing while its ability to import those goods decreased because many countries ceased trading relations after the Soviet entry into the Molotov–Ribbentrop Pact. The Soviet Union could offer precious little technology, while Germany possessed the technology the Soviet Union required to build a blue-water fleet. Accordingly, for the six weeks following the Soviet and German invasions of Poland, Germany pressed hard for an additional agreement.

On 14 and 15 September 1939, German foreign minister Joachim von Ribbentrop outlined a program for his negotiations in Moscow. It included attempting to obtain 180 million additional Reichsmarks in raw material and discovering whether the Soviet Union "could and would compensate for the loss in Imports by sea" following the British blockade. Ribbentrop foresaw the negotiation as "a test of whether and how far Stalin is prepared to draw practical conclusions from the new political course". Ribbentrop concluded that "The raw materials deliveries requested by us can only be carried out, in view of the unsatisfactory domestic supply situation of Russia, at the expense of their own Russian consumption."

=== Events following the division of Poland ===
Planned and actual territorial changes in Central Europe 1939–1940

The Soviet alliance resulted in a huge military benefit to Germany, which thereafter needed to station only four regular and nine territorial divisions on its eastern border, permitting it to commit the remainder of its forces westward. The pact also avoided at the outset the two front war, or "encirclement", that Germans had feared since the late 19th century, and against which Germany was not then prepared to fight.

However, following the conclusions of the successful Polish invasions by both countries, German planners estimated that, as feared, they lacked the oil and rubber stockpiles necessary for a western offensive. It had imported 140.8 million Reichsmarks in Polish goods in 1938, and half of that territory was now held by the Soviet Union. This included fields amounting to seventy per cent of Poland's oil production. Stalin at the time agreed in vague terms to supply Germany with additional oil equal to that produced by now Soviet-occupied Polish oil fields at Drohobych and Boryslav in exchange for hard coal and steel tubing.

On 28 September 1939, Germany and the Soviet Union extended the scope of the German–Soviet Credit Agreement of 19 August 1939 Subsequently, the Soviet Union dispatched a procurement commission to Germany to select German goods for delivery in exchange for Soviet raw materials. Ribbentrop suggested that the Soviet Union should relinquish the oil district of Drohobycz and Boryslaw, near Lviv now Ukraine, to Germany because Russia possessed rich oil resources while Germany lacked them. Stalin rejected this, but promised Germany the district's entire annual production, amounting today to 270,000 metric tons (300,000 short tons; 270,000 long tons), but which he hoped would increase to 450,000 metric tons (500,000 short tons; 440,000 long tons). In return for this, Germany would supply coal and steel tubing. Molotov summarized the results of the negotiations in a letter stating "I have the honor to confirm herewith that the Government of the USSR is willing, on the basis and in the sense of the general political understanding reached by us, to promote by all means the trade relations and the exchange of goods between Germany and the USSR. To this end an economic program will be drawn up by both parties, under which the Soviet Union will supply raw materials to Germany, for which Germany, in turn, will make compensation through deliveries of manufactured goods over a more extended period of time. A confidential amendment to the letter stated that the Soviet Union would effectuate German transit traffic to and from Romania, followed by agreements for the same to and from Iran, Afghanistan and the Far East.

Within one month, the countries began a regular exchange of goods by rail lines through Poland. At the same time, it was already clear that Germany could not meet the 1940 self-sufficiency targets that it had set forth in Hitler's 1936 Four Year Plan.

=== October 1939: German demands ===
In early October, German officials proposed a deal that would have increased Soviet raw material exports (oil, iron ore, rubber, tin, etc.) to Germany over the next year from 180 million to over 1.3 billion Reichsmark, for which Germany would pay 810 million Reichsmark the first year and capital goods in the second year. The raw materials were to include oil, industrial materials (including iron and chromium), food, lumber, and "Non-Russian raw materials to be bought via Russia in other countries (tin, copper, nickel, cobalt, tungsten, rubber, etc.)". As well, the proposal would include "Joint German-Soviet economic planning. German technical assistance in raw material production and industrial expansion, agricultural conversion (soybeans), forest leases, fisheries at Murmansk, etc." Schulenburg was also instructed to notify Molotov of the German desire for prompt agreement on an immediate program to last about six months.

Germany sent an economic delegation of 37 members headed by Ritter and Schnurre to Moscow on 7 October. While negotiations proceeded quickly at first, on 16 October, German officials reported that "the negotiations are not proceeding as methodically as we are accustomed to" and that Russian tactics were becoming "rather tiresome".

Soviet negotiators stated that any deal must involve massive increases of up to 1.5 billion Reichsmarks in German war materiel and technology. Aside from the hulls of the cruisers Seydlitz and Lützow, the final order list also included the delivery of the Prinz Eugen and the plans of the battleship Bismarck. Stunned German military officials responded that Soviet requests for military technology and hardware were too steep of a price, and would require impossible amounts of iron and steel to produce, while Germany needed such materials for its war in Western Europe. At the same time, Germany accepted an offer by the Soviet Union to provide Germany a naval base, Basis Nord, at then undeveloped Zapadnaya Litsa (120 kilometers (75 mi) from Murmansk) from which they could stage raiding operations.

On 30 November 1939, Soviet officials submitted the final list of the orders to be placed in Germany by the Soviet Union. It included war materiel as well as machinery and industrial installations.

=== Soviet–German tensions ===
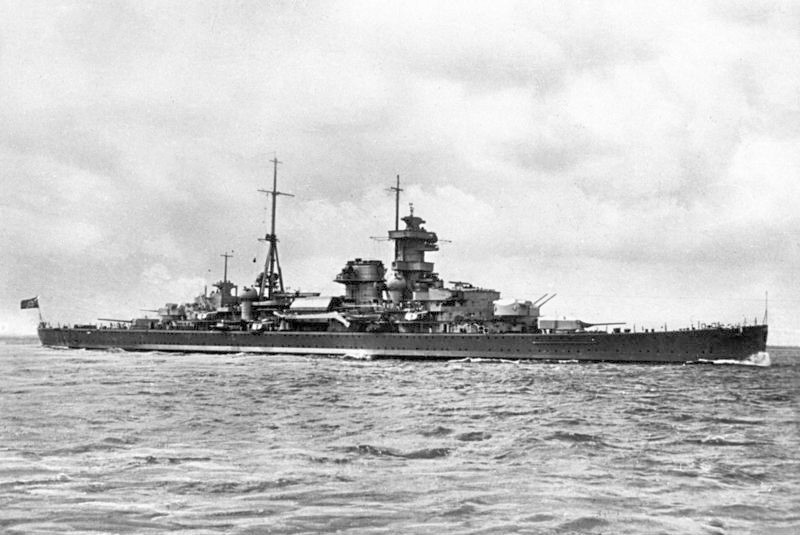
Admiral Hipper-class heavy cruiser

In December, the talks reached a low point as Soviet officials continued to press demands for German military equipment and technology, including the delivery of German Admiral Hipper-class cruisers Lützow, Seydlitz and Prinz Eugen. German officials noted that Soviet demand for some items by the end of 1940 would be impossible to meet, and would effectively have required three to four years of production. Molotov conceded the difficulties given Germany's ongoing war and the prospects for agreement improved. Tensions were also raised by the unsuccessful Soviet invasion of Finland, though the unexpected bloodbath that ensued left a Soviet general explaining at the time, "We have conquered just enough Finnish territory to allow us to bury our dead." At the same time, that winter, Germany had become concerned about the state and future of their economy.

After a joint meeting of German officials, on 2 December 1939 at Hitler's residence, the Soviet's demands were rejected, followed by the Soviet commission's resubmission. On 8 December 1939, Hitler rejected offers to purchase the Seydlitz, the Prinz Eugen and turrets of battleships under construction. However, at Hitler's residence discussed the possible delivery to Soviet a technical plans used in the construction of the Bismarck. The German Naval Commander in Chief noted at the time that "only two ships are being built and the Russians need at least six years to copy them".

By then end of December, the talks had deteriorated to the point where they could no longer be resolved by lower level negotiations. As had become typical for Stalin, he intervened into the fray late, playing the "good cop" to reach a compromise. On 28 December 1939 in a meeting at the Kremlin with German Minister Schnurre (who headed the German procurement commission), Stalin began to speak of the Soviet wishes in regard to warships and welcomed the fact that Germany was prepared to deliver the cruiser Lützow. He also noted "If Germany declined to deliver other ships in process of construction because she wanted to complete them herself, we could not object to this stand."

On the midnight of 31 December 1939, German negotiators were called to the Kremlin to discuss further trade negotiations. The negotiators primarily discussed the Soviet needs for metal production, naval armament, machine tools and aircraft. Unlike with the 1939 agreement, Stalin used the term "mutual assistance" for the first time and discussed the direct provision of Soviet raw materials to Germany. He stated "the Soviet Union sees this not merely as a normal treaty for the exchange of goods, rather as one of mutual assistance". Stalin also stated "The Soviet Union wants to learn from Germany, particularly in the field of armaments."

In January, Germany became worried that combating a potential major French campaign in western Europe or a Soviet failure to deliver allotted good totals would result in German oil stocks evaporating in a few months. Grain reserves that had earlier appeared less tenuous now appeared more dicey, with Germany facing an estimated 1.5-million-metric-ton (1.6 million short tons; 1.4×10^{6} long tons) shortfall for 1940 even under optimal conditions. A German foreign office report explained that Soviet raw material exports were "simply irreplaceable" and "the breakdown of a German-Soviet agreement must be avoided at all costs". The Soviets made clear in additional discussions with Soviet Foreign Minister Molotov that they were willing to make raw materials available on an accelerated basis in exchange for extended deliveries of war materiel.

Soviet–German tensions related to prices, terms, and schedule of delivery lasted until February 1940. Hitler desired to delay as long as possible delivery of the "industrial goods" mentioned in the list of the orders to be placed, including the transmission of plans for the Bismarck class and of the Lützow to Russia in furtherance of his hope that Germany could avoid these altogether if the war developed favorably for it. In February 1940, negotiations neared conclusion, but Germany demanded (by Soviet assessment) unfavorably high prices for their goods. The Soviets deemed as too high the German valuation of the cruiser 'Lutzow' at 150 million Reichsmark.

=== Talks approach finality ===
Further discussions took place in Moscow in early February regarding the specifics of German military equipment to be provided. Both sides made concessions after a letter from Ribbentrop to Stalin convinced him that a deal must be completed. Stalin was involved with the details of the discussion, with Hitler noting that he was impressed by Stalin's technical knowledge when he chaired a meeting of experts discussing the ordnance of gun turrets to be included on a cruiser the Germans would deliver to the Soviets under an agreement. Germany agreed that the plans for the battleship Bismarck could be included in the war materiel to be provided to the Soviet Union. The final cost of the Lützow, was discounted to 104 million Reichsmarks. Joseph Stalin noted in discussion with Politburo members—"ship, which you've bought from expected enemy, is equal to two ships—one more at you and one less at enemy".

== The Agreement ==
On 11 February 1940, Germany and the Soviet Union entered into an intricate trade pact in which the Soviet Union would send Germany 650 million Reichsmarks in raw materials in exchange for 650 million Reichsmark in machinery, manufactured goods and technology. The trade pact helped Germany to surmount the British blockade. The main raw materials specified in the agreement were 0.91 million metric tons (1 million short tons; 0.89×10^{6} long tons) of grain, 820,000 metric tons (900,000 short tons; 810,000 long tons) of oil and more than 450,000 metric tons (500,000 short tons; 440,000 long tons) of various metal ores (mostly iron ore) in exchange for synthetic material plants, ships, turrets, machine tools and coal. The first stipulation of the agreement provided that the Soviet Union must deliver its requisite goods within 18 months while Germany was to deliver its required goods within 27 months. The agreement also contained a "Confidential Protocol" providing the Soviet Union would undertake purchases from third party countries of "metals and other goods" on behalf of Germany.

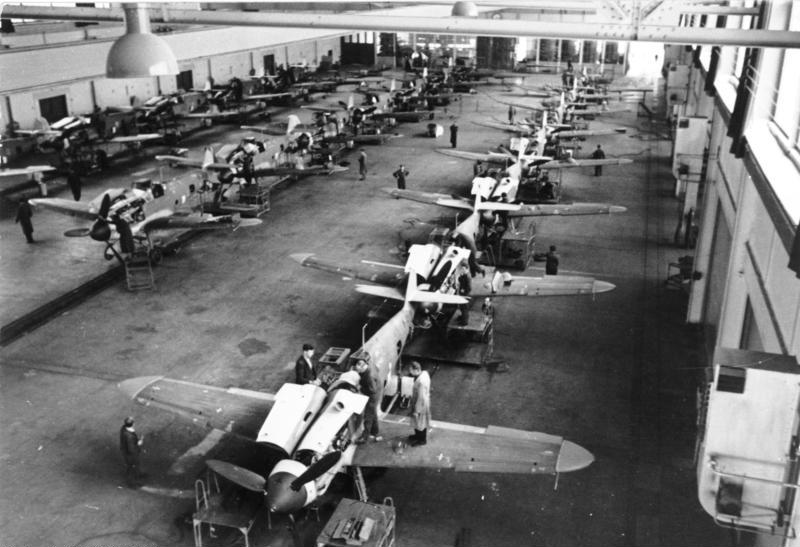
1943 Bf 109 G-6 production

Soviet goods were freighted through Brest-Litovsk and occupied Polish territories where they were shifted to European gauge track for transport to Germany. The Soviets also granted Germany the right to transit traffic on Soviet-controlled rail lines to and from Romania, Iran, Afghanistan, and other countries in the east, while reducing by 50 percent freight rates to Manchukuo, which was under Japanese control. The agreement set out periods of operations under which the Soviet Union would send to Germany large quantities of raw materials, including food, oil and metals.

The Soviets were to receive the incomplete Admiral Hipper-class naval cruiser Lützow, the plans to the battleship Bismarck, information on German naval testing, "complete machinery for a large destroyer", heavy naval guns, three 38.1-centimeter (15.0 in) twin turrets to defend ports, preliminary sketches for a 40.6-centimeter (16.0 in) triple turret, working drawings for a 28-centimeter (11 in) turret, other naval gear and samples of 30 of Germany's latest warplanes, including the Bf 109 fighter, Bf 110 fighter, and Ju 88 bomber. Stalin believed the Lützow to be important because of its new 20.3-centimeter (8.0 in) naval guns, along with their performance characteristics. The Soviets would also receive oil and electric equipment, locomotives, turbines, generators, diesel engines, ships, machine tools, and samples of Germany artillery, tanks, explosives, chemical-warfare equipment, and other items.

== Trade and assistance during the agreement's operation ==
While some slowdowns and negotiations occurred especially during the early negotiations of specific orders, the Soviet Union met most of its requirements under the agreement. It became a major supplier of vital materials to Germany, including petroleum, manganese, copper, nickel, chrome, platinum, lumber, and grain.

The Soviet Union also bought and shipped other materials to Germany, such as rubber from India. The Soviets shipped approximately 800 million deutschmarks of goods. The Soviets also provided Germany with a U-boat base at Basis Nord for refueling, maintenance location and a takeoff point for raids and attacks on shipping. Though the German Navy never fully utilized "Basis Nord". In addition, the Soviets provided Germany with access to the Northern Sea Route for both cargo ships and raiders (though only the raider Komet used the route before June 1941), which forced Britain to protect sea lanes in both the Atlantic and the Pacific.

Germany, which was provided 27 months to finish delivery of its goods, procrastinated as long as possible on deliveries. On 11 August, the Soviet Union had shipped 190 million Reichsmarks of raw materials against just 90 million Reichsmarks of German deliveries. Germany did initially deliver some floating cranes, five aircraft, an electrode shop, several gun turrets (with fire control apparatuses and spare parts), two submarine periscopes, and additional ship construction tools. A few months later, it delivered a sample of its harvest technology.

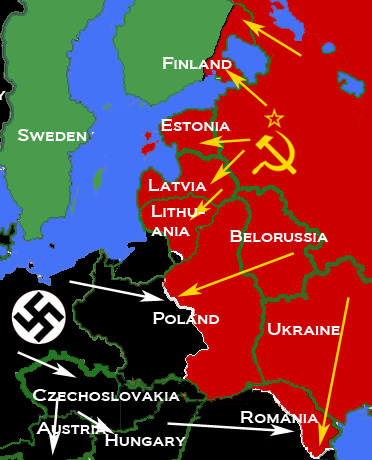
Soviet and German invasions, annexations, and alliances in central and eastern Europe 1939–1940

In mid-1940, Germany grew even more dependent on Soviet imports. German occupations of France, the Netherlands, and Belgium created additional demand while decreasing avenues for indirect supply. Compared to 1938 figures, the expanded "Greater Germany" and its sphere of influence lacked, among other items, 450,000 metric tons (500,000 short tons; 440,000 long tons) of manganese, 3.0 million metric tons (3.3 million short tons; 2.9×10^{6} long tons) of raw phosphate, 180,000 metric tons (200,000 short tons; 180,000 long tons) of rubber, and 8.6 million metric tons (9.5 million short tons; 8.5×10^{6} long tons) of oil. Hitler believed that an eventual invasion of the Soviet Union increasingly looked like the only way in which Germany could solve its resource crisis. The Soviet invasions of Lithuania, Estonia and Latvia in June 1940 resulted in the Soviet occupation of states on which Germany had relied for 96.7 million Reichsmarks of imports in 1938. While no concrete plans were yet made, Hitler told one of his generals in June that the victories in western Europe "finally freed his hands for his important real task: the showdown with Bolshevism", though German generals told Hitler that occupying Western Russia would create "more of a drain than a relief for Germany's economic situation".

In August 1940, the Soviet Union briefly suspended its deliveries after their relations were strained following disagreement over policy in the Balkans, the Soviet Union's war with Finland (from which Germany had imported 88.9 million Reichsmarks in goods in 1938), Germany falling behind in its deliveries of goods under the pact and with Stalin worried that Hitler's war with the West might end quickly after France signed an armistice. By the end of August, relations improved again as the countries had redrawn the Hungarian and Romanian borders, settled Bulgarian claims and Stalin was again convinced that Germany would face a long war in the west with Britain's improvement in its air battle with Germany and the execution of an agreement between the United States and Britain regarding destroyers and bases. Soviet raw material deliveries increased well over prior figures.

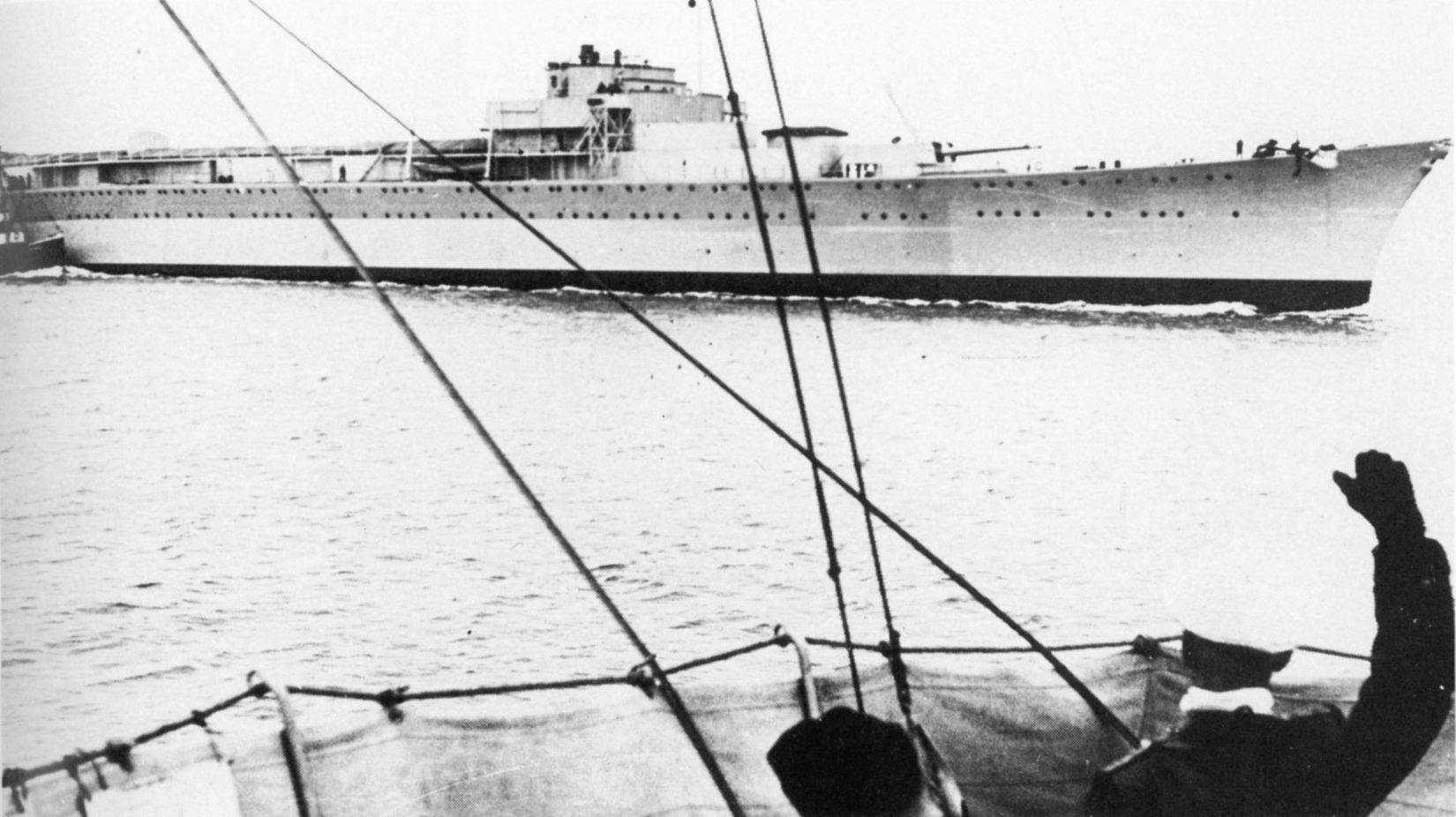
Heavy cruiser Lützow in 1940

Germany delayed its delivery of the cruiser Lützow and the plans for the Bismarck as long as possible, hoping to avoid delivery altogether if the war developed favorably. The incomplete Lützow was towed to Leningrad in mid-1940 in a less complete state than the Soviets had anticipated. In response to later Soviet orders, Germany did deliver eight 38.1-centimeter (15.0 in) guns and six 40-centimeter (16 in) guns for which the Soviets had requested drawings. The Lützow, which was not yet completed, was towed to Leningrad, where German engineers worked on the vessel until 22 June 1941.

In October 1940, German officials estimated that their raw material supplies could only comfortably last through the summer of 1941. The situation was much more dire for rubber, the use for which in boots and tires was vital for any mobile army. German stocks had fallen to only 1,400 metric tons (1,500 short tons; 1,400 long tons).

Hitler had been considering war with the Soviet Union since July 1940. Regarding a potential Soviet Axis entry, Ribbentrop wrote a letter promising Stalin that "in the opinion of the Führer [...] it appears to be the historical mission of the Four Powers-the Soviet Union, Italy, Japan and Germany-to adopt a long range-policy and to direct the future development of their peoples into the right channels by delimitation of their interests in a worldwide scale". On 12 November 1940, Hitler issued secret "Instruction No. 18", directing his forces to prepare for war in the east "irrespective of the results yielded by these discussions", while Hitler, Molotov, and Ribbentrop conferenced in Berlin to discuss a potential Soviet entry as a fourth Axis power. Hitler wanted an additional economic deal to get what he could from the Soviet Union before the invasion, while other German officials wanted such a deal in the hopes that it could change the current anti-Soviet direction of German policy. In November, Germany and the Soviet Union began negotiations on enlarging the 1940 German–Soviet Commercial Agreement, and discussed border disputes and other issues, culminating in the execution of the 10 January 1941 German–Soviet Border and Commercial Agreement.

=== British blockade failure ===
Upon the outbreak of war, the British Ministry of Economic Warfare was established on 3 September 1939 to oversee the strategy of blockading Germany. By April 1940, Britain was aware that two areas, the Black Sea and Mediterranean were weak points, Germany being supplied by several neutral countries, including Italy through those areas. The reaction of neutral states to new Anglo-French blockade measures imposed against Germany in late November 1939—that all German goods of German origin or German ownership found on neutral ships would be seized in retaliation for illegal German use of mines—was in the form of diplomatic protest. All neutrals affected by the measures had complained and Germany was urging them to take joint countermeasures. Belgium, the Netherlands, Denmark, Sweden, Norway, Japan, and Iran lodged protests with Britain. A spokesman of the Japanese Foreign Ministry threatened countermeasures in case the British action should damage important Japanese interests. The Brazilian Foreign Minister stated that in all probability the Inter-American Neutrality Commission, which was due to meet shortly in Rio, would decide to protest against the tightening of British blockade regulations.

	Soviet Union	Poland & Danzig	Finland	Estonia	Latvia	Lithuania
1939	52.8	140.8	88.9	24.3	43.6	27.8
*German Imports in millions of Reichsmarks

	Soviet Union	General Government (Poland)	Finland	Estonia	Latvia	Lithuania	Reichskommissariat of Belgium and Northern France	Denmark	Sweden	Italy	Romania	Reichskommissariat Niederlande
1940	395.7	91.4	79.6	29.0	68.5	54.7	227.1	494.5	345.9	508.0	427.1	406.1
*German Imports in millions of Reichsmarks

	Soviet Union	General Government (Poland)	Finland	Vichy France	Hungary	Reichskommissariat Norwegen	RK of Belgium and Northern France	Denmark	Sweden	Italy	Romania	RK Niederlande
1941	325.5	87.5	144.9	751.8	351.1	280.4	561.6	410.2	476.9	930.8	346.9	640.1
*German Imports in millions of Reichsmarks

British attempts "to starve" Germany were largely unsuccessful. In 1937–1938, Germany's own supply from domestic sources constituted 89 percent of grain, 90 percent of milk and dairy products, 95 percent of meat, 74 percent in fish, and 79 percent of eggs. German agriculture had been fully mobilized by the Nazi leadership, haunted by memories of the blockade of Germany in World War I and later was able to maintain per capita foodstuff supplies to 1942, after which there was a steady deterioration in both the quality and quantity of the civilian ration.

== Total trade ==
During both the first period of the 1940 agreement (11 February 1940 to 1941) and the second (11 February 1941 until the Pact was broken), Germany received massive quantities of raw materials, including over:

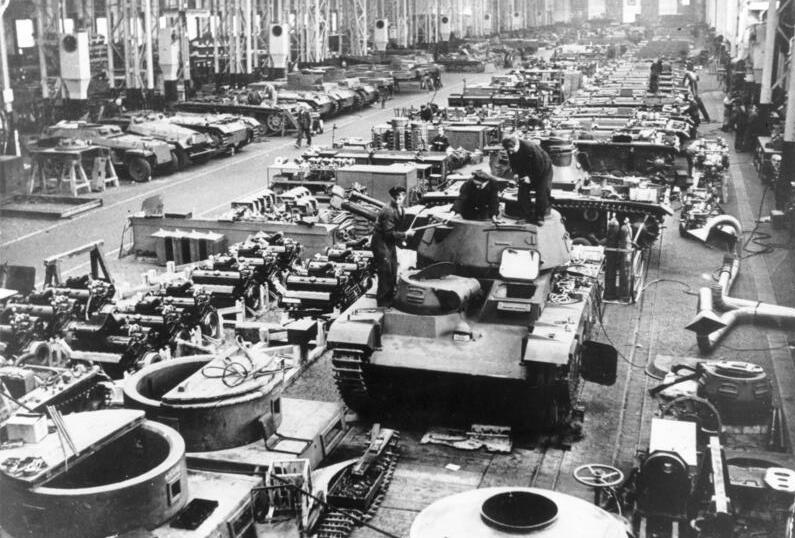
German Neubaufahrzeug production, 1940

- 1,500,000 metric tons (1,700,000 short tons; 1,500,000 long tons) of grains
- 820,000 metric tons (900,000 short tons; 810,000 long tons) of oil
- 180,000 metric tons (200,000 short tons; 180,000 long tons) of cotton
- 130,000 metric tons (140,000 short tons; 130,000 long tons) of manganese
- 180,000 metric tons (200,000 short tons; 180,000 long tons) of phosphates
- 18,000 metric tons (20,000 short tons; 18,000 long tons) of chrome ore
- 16,000 metric tons (18,000 short tons; 16,000 long tons) of rubber
- 91,000 metric tons (100,000 short tons; 90,000 long tons) of soybeans
- 450,000 metric tons (500,000 short tons; 440,000 long tons) of iron ores
- 270,000 metric tons (300,000 short tons; 270,000 long tons) of scrap metal and pig iron
- 200,000 kilograms (440,000 lb) of platinum

Large amounts of crude oil were delivered, with German documents in 1940 already indicating that the Soviets had delivered crude oil at a rate of 140,000 metric tons (150,000 short tons; 140,000 long tons) a month for five months in 900 German tank cars exclusively reserved for it.

== Hitler breaks the Pact ==
On 22 June 1941, Germany began Operation Barbarossa, the invasion of the Soviet Union through the territories that the two countries had previously divided. Despite fears helping cause the Soviet Union to enter deals with Germany in 1939, that Germany came so close to destroying the Soviet Union was due, in large part, to Soviet actions taken from 1939 to 1941. Without Soviet imports, German stocks would have run out in several key products by October 1941, only three and a half months into the invasion. Germany would have already run through their stocks of rubber and grain before the first day of the invasion were it not for Soviet imports:

	Total USSR imports	June 1941 German stocks	June 1941 (without USSR imports)	October 1941 German stocks	October 1941 (without USSR imports)
Oil products	827 (912; 814)	1,220 (1,350; 1,210)	397 (438; 391)	821 (905; 808)	−6.4 (−7; −6.3)
Rubber	17.1 (18.8; 16.8)	12.5 (13.8; 12.3)	−4.4 (−4.9; −4.4)	11.0 (12.1; 10.8)	−6.1 (−6.7; −6.0)
Manganese	171.9 (189.5; 169.2)	186 (205; 183)	14.1 (15.5; 13.8)	150 (170; 150)	−17.7 (−19.5; −17.4)
Grain	1,485.2 (1,637.1; 1,461.7)	1,253 (1,381; 1,233)	−232.3 (−256.1; −228.7)	690 (761; 679)	−794.8 (−876.1; −782.2)
*German stocks in thousands of metric tons (short tons; long tons) (with and without USSR imports-October 1941 aggregate)

Without Soviet deliveries of these four major items, Germany could barely have attacked the Soviet Union, let alone come close to victory, even with more intense rationing. At the time of the invasion, the Lützow was still not yet complete enough for sea travel, but four 20.3-centimeter (8.0 in) turrets had been installed. The Soviets used her as a floating gun battery against German invaders.

== See also ==
- Basis Nord
- German–Soviet Border and Commercial Agreement
- German–Soviet Credit Agreement (1939)
- Invasion of Poland
- Molotov–Ribbentrop Pact
- Molotov–Ribbentrop Pact negotiations
- Operation Barbarossa
- Soviet invasion of Poland
- Soviet–German relations before 1941
