= German–Soviet Credit Agreement (1939) =

Credit agreement between Nazi Germany and Soviet Union

- Signed: August 19, 1939
- Location: Berlin, Germany
- Signatories: Soviet Union; (Nazi Germany) Germany
- Languages: German, Russian

The German–Soviet Credit Agreement (also referred to as the German–Soviet Trade and Credit Agreement) was an economic arrangement between Nazi Germany and the Soviet Union whereby the latter received an acceptance credit of 200 million ℛ︁ℳ︁ over seven years with an effective interest rate of 4.5 percent. The credit line was to be used during the next two years for purchase of capital goods (factory equipment, installations, machinery and machine tools, ships, vehicles, and other means of transport) in Germany and was to be paid off by means of Soviet material shipment from 1946 onwards. The economic agreement was the first step toward improvement in relations between the Soviet Union and Germany.

On 11 May 1939, the day after the Credit Agreement, the Soviet Union went to war against Japan in a successful four-week military campaign in the Far East. The Nazi-Soviet Pact(also called the Molotov- Ribbentrop Pact) was signed four days after the Credit Agreement. The 1939 German–Soviet Commercial Agreement renewed declined German–Soviet economic relations and was adjusted and expanded with the larger German–Soviet Commercial Agreement in February 1940 and January 1941 German–Soviet Border and Commercial Agreement. German shipments to the Soviets became tardy and failed to provide all that was promised the closer the date of Barbarossa came. The Soviets fulfilled their obligations to the letter right up until the invasion, wanting to avoid provoking Germany. All these agreements were terminated when Germany invaded the Soviet Union in June 1941, in violation of the treaties between the two countries. Soviet trade with Germany in the pre-invasion period ended up providing the Germans with much of the resources they needed for their invasion of the Soviet Union, including raw materials such as grain and oil.

== Background ==
=== Traditional commerce and pre-Nazi trade ===
Germany lacks natural resources, including several key raw materials needed for economic and military operations. Since the late 19th century, it had relied heavily upon Russian imports of such materials. Before World War I, Germany imported 1.5 billion Reichsmarks of raw materials and other goods per year from Russia. Such imports fell sharply after World War I. In the early 1930s, Soviet imports decreased as the more isolationist Stalinist regime asserted power and dwindling adherence to the disarmament requirements of the Treaty of Versailles decreased Germany's reliance on Soviet imports.

=== Deteriorating relations ===
The rise to power of the Nazi Party increased tensions between Germany and the Soviet Union, with Nazi racial ideology casting the Soviet Union as populated by "untermenschen" ethnic Slavs ruled by their "Jewish Bolshevik" masters. Even with rising tensions, in the mid-1930s, the Soviet Union made repeated efforts to reestablish closer contacts with Germany., which were rebuffed by Hitler, who wished to steer clear of such political ties.

Relations further declined in 1936, when Germany supported the Fascist Spanish Nationalists in the Spanish Civil War, while the Soviets supported the partially socialist-led Spanish Republic opposition. The same year, Germany and Japan entered the Anti-Comintern Pact. Stalinist purges also disrupted Soviet diplomacy.

=== Late 1930s economic needs ===
By the late 1930s, because an autarkic economic approach or an alliance with Britain were impossible, Germany needed to arrange closer relations with the Soviet Union, if not just for economic reasons alone. Germany lacked key supplies, such as oil and food, metal ores and rubber, for which it relied upon Soviet supply or transit, and had to look to Russia and Romania. Moreover, Germany's food requirements would grow further if it conquered nations that were also net food importers. Soviet imports of Ukrainian grains or Soviet transshipments of Manchurian soybeans could make up the shortfall. Meanwhile, the Soviet Union required, in the short term, military equipment and weapon designs to strengthen the weakened Red Army and Red Navy. The Soviet transportation network was woefully underdeveloped, with roads approaching non-existence and rail lines already stretched to their limits.

After the Anschluss in mid-1938, economic reconciliation was hampered by political tension and Hitler's increasing hesitance to deal with the Soviet Union. However, German needs for military supplies and Soviet needs for military machinery increased after the Munich Agreement.

== Negotiations ==
=== Preliminary discussions ===
In October 1938, Germany started pushing for expansion of economic ties between the two countries and presented a plan to the Soviets on December 1, 1938. Stalin, however, was not willing to sell his increasingly strong economic bargaining position for the small price that Hitler was then willing to offer. The Soviets were willing to engage in talks discussing a new German offer in February and March 1939 in Moscow. Germany put the talks on hold in mid-March. A few days thereafter, Germany occupied Czechoslovakia and then the Klaipėda Region (Memel), making a German war with Poland far more likely.

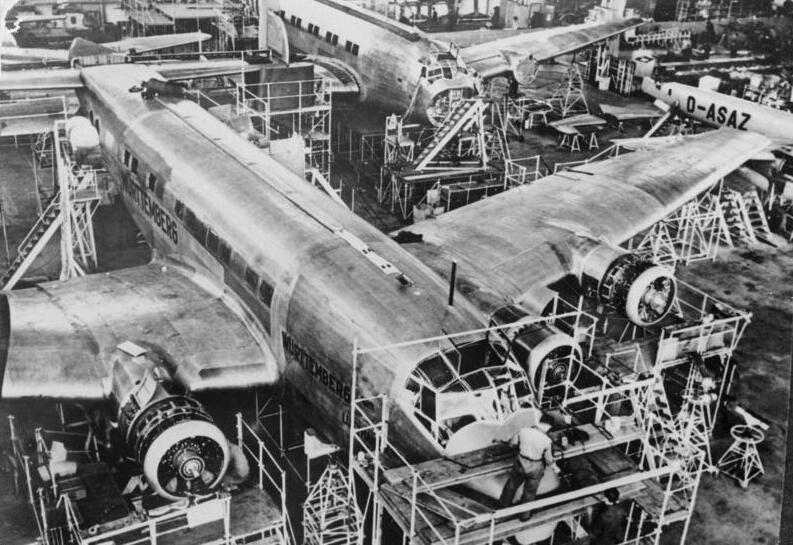
German Ju 90 aircraft developed for and used by Lufthansa, 1938

Germany and the Soviet Union discussed entering into an economic deal throughout early 1939. During spring and summer 1939, the Soviets negotiated a political and military pact with France and Britain, while at the same time talking with German officials about a potential political Soviet–German agreement. On April 7, Soviet diplomat Georgii Astakhov stated to the German Foreign Ministry that there was no point in continuing the German–Soviet ideological struggle and that the two countries could come to an agreement. Ten days later, Soviet ambassador Alexei Merekalov met with German State Secretary Ernst Weizsacker and presented him a note requesting speedy removal of any obstacles for fulfillment of military contracts signed between Czechoslovakia and the USSR before the former was occupied by Germany. According to German accounts, at the end of the discussion the ambassador stated "there exists for Russia no reason why she should not live with us on a normal footing. And from normal the relations might become better and better." Other sources claim that it could be an exaggeration or inaccurate recounting of the ambassador's words. Immediately after the meeting, the Soviet ambassador had been withdrawn to Moscow and never returned to Germany.

Likelihood of war increased military production in both Germany and the Soviet Union. The Soviets' Third Five Year Plan would require massive new infusions of technology and industrial equipment. Meanwhile, German military spending increased to 23% of gross national product in 1939. German planners in April and May 1939 feared that a cessation of Swedish trade would cut key iron ore supplies. Without Soviet supplies, it was estimated that Germany would need to find substitutes for approximately 165,000 tons of manganese and almost 2 million tons of oil per year. Germany already faced severe rubber shortages because of British and Dutch refusals to trade. In addition to domestic food fat and oil importation reliance, other food problems arose from labor shortages in the agricultural sector that required the work of schoolchildren and students. On May 8, German officials estimated that Germany had oil reserves for only 3.1 months.

In the context of further economic discussions, on May 17, Astakhov told a German official that he wanted to restate "in detail that there were no conflicts in foreign policy between Germany and Soviet Russia and that therefore there was no reason for any enmity between the two countries." Three days later, on May 20, Molotov told the German ambassador in Moscow that he no longer wanted to discuss only economic matters, and that it was necessary to establish a "political basis", which German officials saw an "implicit invitation" and a "virtual summoning us to a political dialogue." On May 26, German officials feared a potential positive result to come from the Soviets talks regarding proposals by Britain and France. On May 30, Germany directed its diplomats in Moscow that "we have now decided to undertake definite negotiations with the Soviet Union." The ensuing discussions were channeled through the economic negotiation, because the economic needs of the two sides were substantial and because close military and diplomatic connections had been severed in the mid-1930s after the creation of the Anti-Comintern Pact and the Spanish Civil War, leaving these talks as the only means of communication.

=== Mixed signals ===
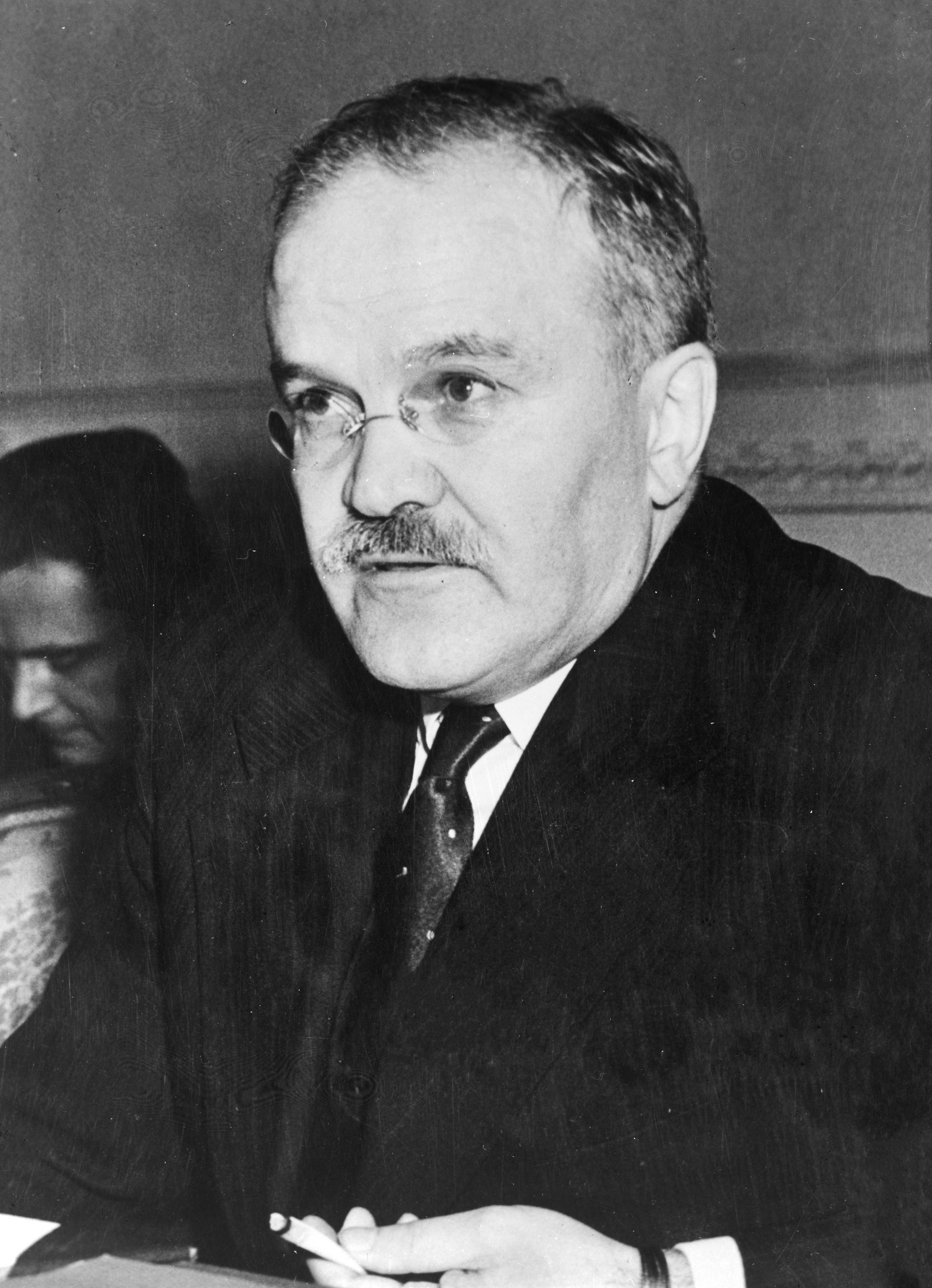
Vyacheslav Molotov

The Soviets sent mixed signals thereafter. On May 31, Molotov's speech appeared to be positive, while on June 2 Soviet Commissar for Foreign Trade Mikoyan told a German official that Moscow "had lost all interest in these [economic] negotiations as a result of earlier German procrastination." On June 15, the Soviet ambassador held a discussion with the Bulgarian ambassador in Berlin, Purvan Draganov, who served as an unofficial intermediary for negotiations with the Germans. The Soviet ambassador explained that a deal with Germany better suited Soviet needs than a deal with Britain and France or inconclusive negotiations resulting in no deal. Draganov promptly informed the German Foreign Ministry of the conversation. Seven days earlier, the Soviets had agreed that a high ranking German official would come to Moscow to continue the negotiations, which occurred in Moscow on July 3. Thereafter, official talks were started in Berlin on July 22.

Meanwhile, hoping to stop the German war machine, in July, Britain conducted talks with Germany regarding a potential plan to bail out the debt-ridden German economy at the cost of one billion pounds in exchange for Germany ending its armaments program. The British press broke the story and Germany eventually rejected the offer.

=== Addressing past hostilities and finalizing the deals ===
On July 25, the Soviet Union and Germany were very close to finalizing the terms of a proposed economic deal. On July 26, over dinner, the Soviets accepted a proposed three-stage agenda which included the economic agenda first and "a new arrangement which took account of the vital political interests of both parties." On August 1, the Soviets raised two conditions before political negotiations could begin: a new economic treaty and the cessation of anti-Soviet attacks by German media. The Germans immediately agreed. Two days later, German Foreign Minister Joachim von Ribbentrop outlined a plan where the countries would agree to nonintervention in the others' affairs and would renounce measures aimed at the others' vital interests and that "there was no problem between the Baltic and the Black Sea that could not be solved between the two of us."

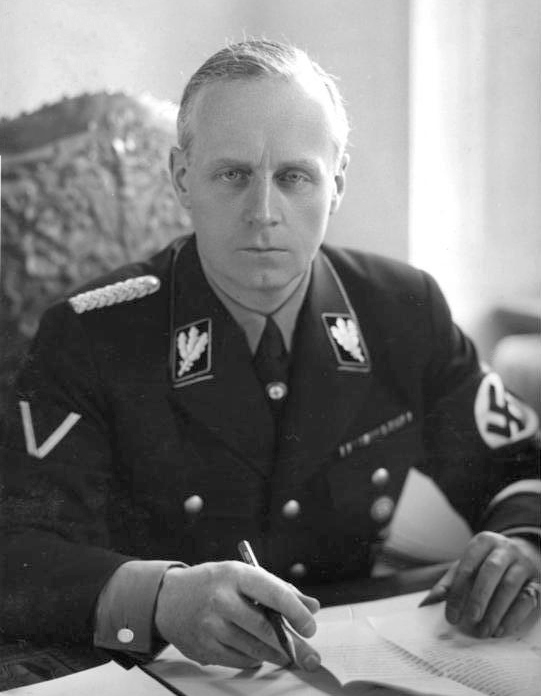
Joachim von Ribbentrop

The Germans discussed prior hostilities between the countries in the 1930s. They addressed their common ground of anti-capitalism, stating "there is one common element in the ideology of Germany, Italy and the Soviet Union: opposition to the capitalist democracies," "neither we nor Italy have anything in common with the capitalist west" and "it seems to us rather unnatural that a socialist state would stand on the side of the western democracies." The Germans explained that their prior hostility toward Soviet Bolshevism had subsided with the changes in the Comintern and the Soviet renunciation of a world revolution. Astakhov characterized the conversation as "extremely important."

As Germany scheduled its invasion of Poland for August 25 and prepared for war with France, German war planners in August estimated that, with an expected British naval blockade and the hostile Soviet Union, Germany would fall short of its war mobilization requirements by 9.9 million tons of oil and 260,000 tons of manganese. At that time, Germany was still importing 20% of foodstuffs, 66% of oil and 80% of rubber. It possessed only two to three months of rubber and three to six months of oil supplies. Because of the expected naval blockade, the Soviet Union would become the only supplier for many items.

On August 5, Soviet officials stated that the completion of the trading credit agreement was crucial for further political talks. Hitler himself telephoned to interrupt economic talks, pushing for a settlement. By August 10, the countries worked out the last minor technical details, but the Soviets delayed signing the economic agreement for almost ten days until they were sure that they had also reached a political agreement. The Soviet ambassador explained that the Soviets had begun their British negotiations "without much enthusiasm" at a time when they felt Germany would not "come to an understanding," and the parallel talks with the British could not be simply broken off when they had been initiated after "mature consideration." Meanwhile, every internal German military and economic study had argued that Germany was doomed to defeat without at least Soviet neutrality. The Wehrmacht High Command issued a report that Germany could only be safe from a blockade on the basis of close economic cooperation with the Soviet Union.

== German–Soviet deal ==
=== Economic deal ===
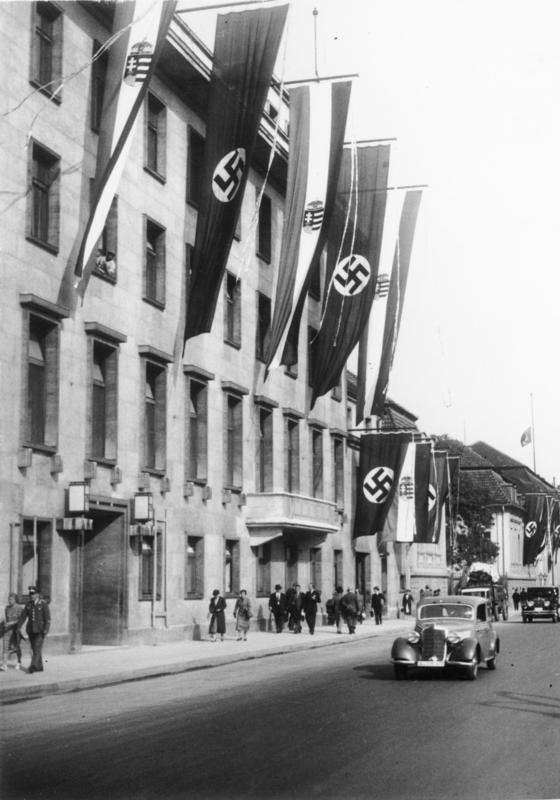
Berlin Reich Chancellery

While the treaty was ready at 4 pm on August 19, the Soviets announced that they could not sign it that day, worrying German officials that the Soviets were delaying for political reasons. When TASS published a report that the Soviet–British–French talks had become snarled over the Far East and "entirely different matters", Germany took it as a signal that there was still time and hope to reach a Soviet–German deal. At 2 am on August 20, Germany and the Soviet Union signed the trade agreement, dated August 19, in Berlin providing for the trade of certain German military and civilian equipment in exchange for Soviet raw materials.

The agreement covered "current" business, which entailed Soviet obligations to deliver 180 million Reichsmarks in raw materials and German commitment to provide the Soviets with 120 million Reichsmarks of German industrial goods. Under the agreement, Germany also granted the Soviet Union a merchandise credit of 200 million ℛ︁ℳ︁ over seven years to be financed by the German Gold Discount Bank. The credit was to be used to finance Soviet "new business" orders in Germany to include machinery, manufactured goods, war materials and hard currency. This loan would be 100% guaranteed by the German government with a 5% interest rate. However, the agreement contained a "Confidential Protocol" providing that the German government would refund 0.5% of the interest, making the effective rate 4.5%. The terms were extremely favorable, at 1.5–2.5% lower as compared to discount rates than such credit lines in the 1920s and early 1930s. The Soviet Union would start to pay off the loan with raw materials seven years later (beginning in 1946).

=== Political deal and secret protocol ===
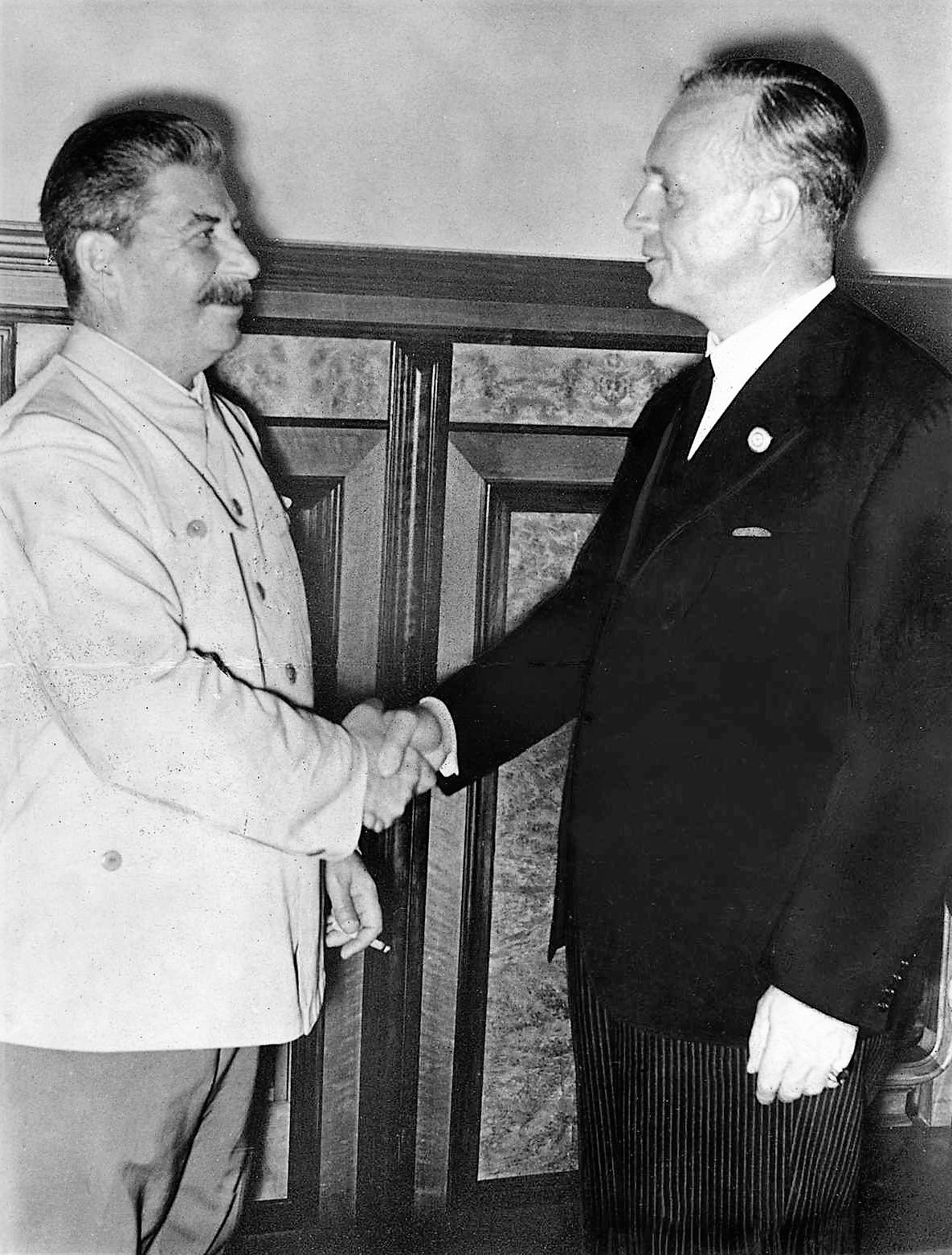
Ribbentrop and Stalin at the signing of the Pact

German Foreign Ministry official Karl Schnurre noted at the time that "[t]he movement of goods envisaged by the agreement might therefore reach a total of more than 1 billion Reichsmarks for the next few years." Schnurre also wrote "[a]part from the economic import of the treaty, its significance lies in the fact that the negotiations also served to renew political contacts with Russia and that the credit agreement was considered by both sides as the first decisive step in the reshaping of political relations." Pravda published an article on August 21 declaring that the August 19 commercial agreement "may appear as a serious step in the cause of improving not only economic, but also political relations between the USSR and Germany." Molotov wrote in Pravda that the August 19 deal was "better than all earlier treaties" and "we have never managed to reach such a favorable economic agreement with Britain, France or any other country."

Early in the morning of August 24, the Soviet Union and Germany signed the political and military deal that accompanied the trade agreement, the Molotov–Ribbentrop Pact. The pact was an agreement of mutual non-aggression between the countries. It contained secret protocols dividing the states of Northern and Eastern Europe into German and Soviet "spheres of influence." At the time, Stalin considered the trade agreement to be more important than the non-aggression pact.

At the signing, Ribbentrop and Stalin enjoyed warm conversations, exchanged toasts and further addressed the prior hostilities between the countries in the 1930s. They characterized Britain as always attempting to disrupt Soviet-German relations, stated that the Anti-Comintern pact was not aimed at the Soviet Union, but actually aimed at Western democracies and "frightened principally the City of London [i.e., the British financiers] and the English shopkeepers."

In 2010, Timothy Snyder linked the improvement in Nazi-Soviet relations in 1939 to Stalin's objective of disrupting the Anti-Comintern Pact and waging war on Japan. Snyder said:

"On 20 August 1939, Hitler sent a personal message to Stalin, asking him to receive Ribbentrop no later than the twenty-third. Ribbentrop made for Moscow, where, as both Orwell and Koestler noted, swastikas adorned the airport of the capital of the homeland of socialism. This, the final ideological shock that separated Koestler from communism, was really a sign that the Soviet Union was no longer an ideological state. The two regimes immediately found common ground in their mutual aspiration to destroy Poland ...the Soviet Union had agreed to attack Poland along with Germany. ... In August and September 1939, Stalin was reading maps not just of east Europe but of east Asia. He had found an opportunity to improve the Soviet position in the Far East. ...Stalin could now be confident that no German-Polish attack was coming from the west... The Soviets (and their Mongolian allies) attacked Japanese (and puppet Manchukuo) forces... on 20 August 1939. Stalin's policy of rapprochement with Berlin of August 23, 1939, was also directed against Tokyo. The Molotov-Ribbentrop Pact between Germany and the Soviet Union, signed three days after the offensive, nullified the Anti-Comintern Pact between Germany and Japan. Even more than the battlefield defeat, the Nazi-Soviet alliance brought a political earthquake to Tokyo. The Japanese government fell, as would several more in the coming months. Once Germany seemed to have chosen the Soviet Union rather than Japan as its ally, the Japanese government found itself in an unexpected and confusing situation... if the union between Moscow and Berlin held, the Red Army would be able to concentrate its forces in Asia rather than in Europe. ... Hitler had given Stalin a free hand in Asia, and the Japanese could only hope that Hitler would betray his new friend. ... When the Red Army defeated the Japanese, on 15 September, Stalin had achieved exactly the result that he wanted. ... Stalin had replaced the phantom of a German-Polish-Japanese encirclement of the Soviet Union with a very real German-Soviet encirclement of Poland, an alliance that isolated Japan."

== Later events and total trade ==
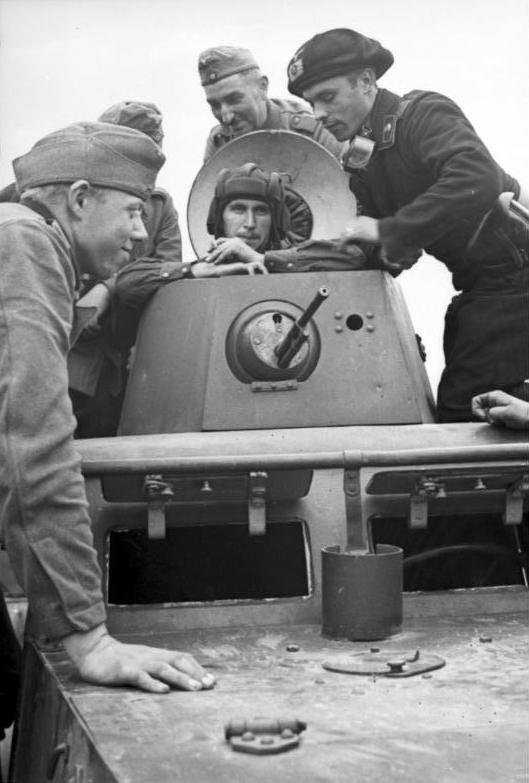
German and Soviet soldiers talk in Brest (Sept. 20, 1939).

After the German invasion of Poland, to administer the economic blockade of Germany, the British Ministry of Economic Warfare was established on September 3, 1939. By April 1940 Britain realized that blockade appeared not to be working because of "leaks" in the blockade, with two major "holes" in the Black Sea and Mediterranean provided by several neutral countries, including Italy.

	Soviet Union	Poland &Danzig	Finland	Estonia	Latvia	Lithuania
1939	52.8	140.8	88.9	24.3	43.6	27.8
*German Imports in millions of Reichsmarks

On September 17, the Red Army invaded eastern Poland and occupied the Polish territory which held up to 70 per cent of Poland's pre-war oil production.

In October three German trade partners - Baltic States – Estonia, Latvia, and Lithuania – were given no choice but to sign a so-called Pact of defense and mutual assistance which permitted the Soviet Union to station troops in them.

German-Soviet tensions were also raised by the Soviet invasion of Finland started at November 1939. Several German merchant ships were damaged.

Germany and the Soviet Union continued economic, military and political negotiations throughout the last half of 1939, which resulted in a much larger German–Soviet Commercial Agreement being signed on February 11, 1940. Under that agreement, the Soviet Union became a major supplier of vital materials to Germany, including petroleum, manganese, copper, nickel, chrome, platinum, lumber and grain. They also received considerable amounts of other vital raw materials, including manganese ore, along with the transit of one million tons of soybeans from Manchuria. On January 10, 1941, the countries signed an additional agreement modifying their 1940 commercial agreement, adjusting borders, and resolving other minor disputes.

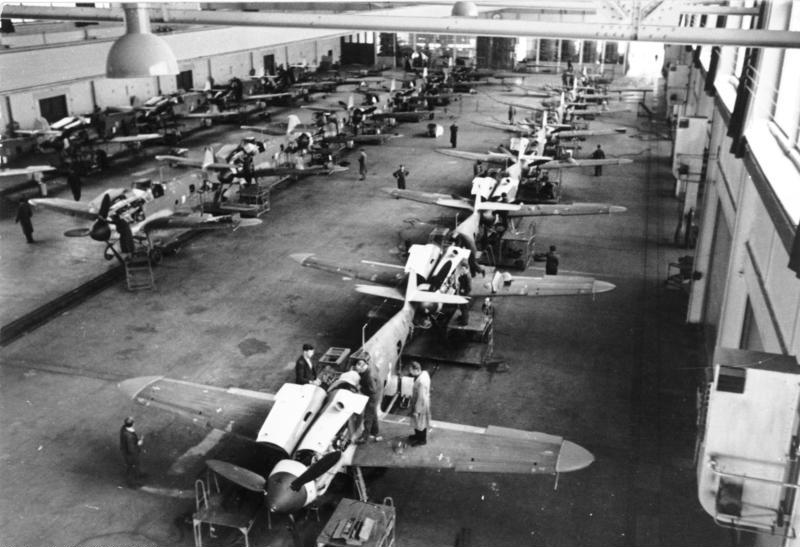
1943 Bf 109G-6 production site

During both the first period of the 1940 agreement (February 11, 1940, to February 11, 1941) and the second (February 11, 1941, until the Pact was broken), Germany received massive quantities of raw materials, including over:

- 1,600,000 tons of grains
- 900,000 tons of oil
- 200,000 tons of cotton
- 140,000 tons of manganese
- 200,000 tons of phosphates
- 20,000 tons of chrome ore
- 18,000 tons of rubber
- 100,000 tons of soybeans
- 500,000 tons of iron ores
- 300,000 tons of scrap metal and pig iron
- 2,000 kilograms of platinum

In August 1940, Soviet imports comprised over 50% of Germany's total overseas imports, which declined at this time to 20.4 thousands of tons.

The trade relations ended when Germany began Operation Barbarossa and invaded the Soviet Union on June 22, 1941.

The various items that the USSR had sent to Germany from 1939 to 1941 in significant amount, could be substituted or obtained by increased imports from other countries. Conversely, without Soviet deliveries of these major items, Germany could barely have attacked the Soviet Union, let alone come close to victory, even with more intense rationing.
