= Orzeł incident =

1939 diplomatic crisis between Estonia and USSR

Orzeł Incident
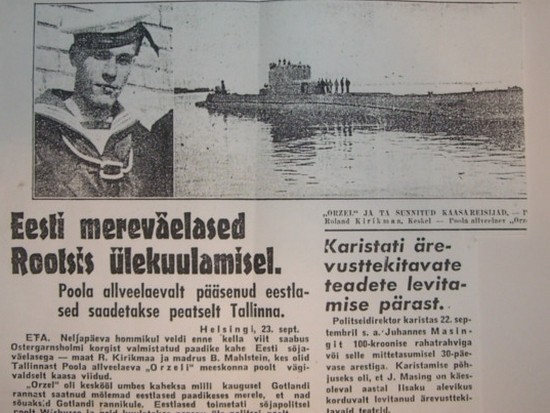
- Coverage of the Orzeł incident in Estonian newspaper Uus Eesti
- Date: 18 September 1939
- Location: Tallinn, Estonia
- Cause: Polish submarine interned by neutral Estonia
- Outcome: Submarine escaped to Great Britain
- Casualties: 2 Estonian guards captured (Note: The captured guards were later set free off the coast of Sweden.)

The Orzeł incident occurred at the beginning of World War II in September 1939, when the interned Polish submarine ORP Orzeł escaped from Tallinn, in neutral Estonia, to the United Kingdom. The Soviet Union used the incident as one of the pretexts to justify its eventual military invasion and occupation of Estonia in June 1940.

== Background ==
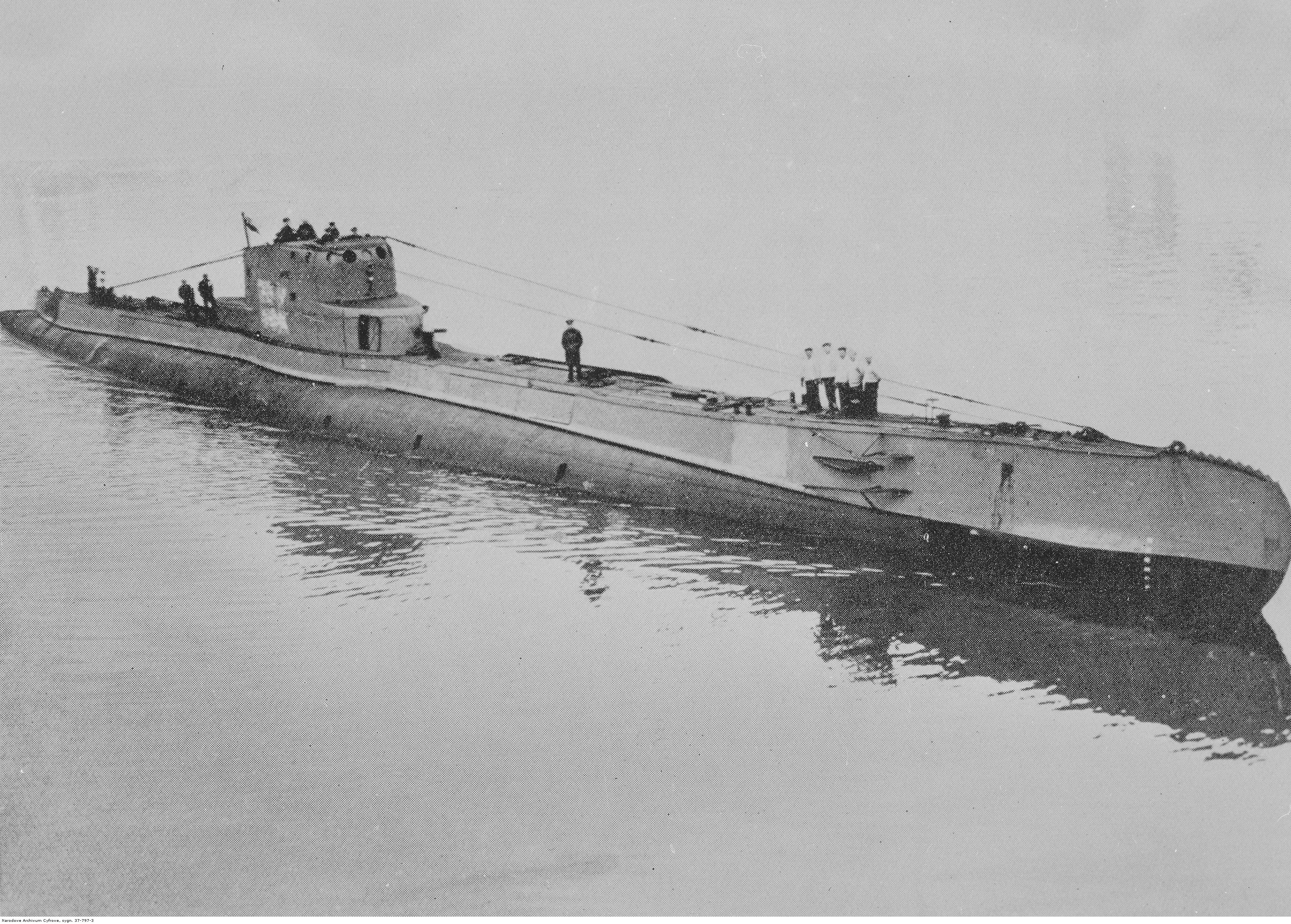
ORP Orzeł

Orzeł was docked at Oksywie when Nazi Germany attacked Poland and began World War II. The submarine at first took part in Operation Worek but was ordered to leave the Gulf of Danzig on 5 September as the situation evolved. On the night of the 5th the Orzeł was attacked by E-boats and bombers dropping depth charges, forcing them to submerge for two hours.

The Orzeł cruised the Baltic for six days without sighting an enemy warship. It was during this time that the commanding officer Lieutenant-Commander Henryk Kłoczkowski became ill and an important piece of equipment broke down.

Damaged and leaking oil, it headed for Tallinn, which it reached on 14 September 1939 at about 21:30. Kłoczkowski was taken to a hospital the next day for treatment of his unidentified illness.

The Hague Convention of 1907 enjoined signatories, including Germany, from interfering with the right of enemy warships to use neutral ports within certain limits. Initially, Estonia was quite accommodating of Orzeł and helped with the repair of a damaged compressor. The first sign of suspicion was when the Orzeł was informed on the 14th that its departure would be delayed for 48 hours to allow the German freighter SS Talassa to depart safely.

However, probably because of German or Soviet pressure, Estonian military authorities soon boarded the ship, declared the crew interned, confiscated all the navigation charts, gun breeches, ammunition, and rifles. An Estonian officer removed the naval ensign from the submarine's stern. While this was taking place the British Naval Attaché handed the crew two cards reading "Good luck and God bless you".

== Incident ==
=== Escape ===
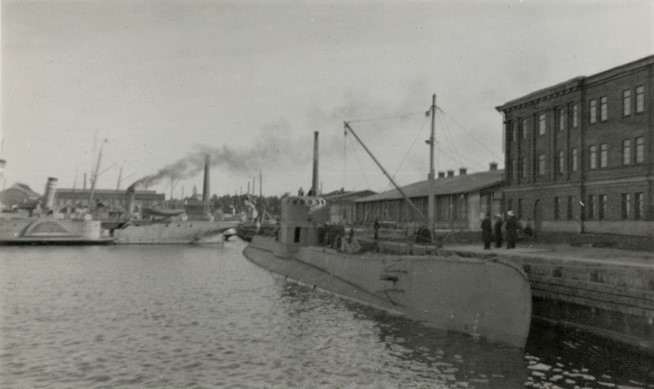
The interned Orzeł in the port of Tallinn

The crew of ORP Orzeł conspired to escape under the new command of its chief officer, Lieutenant Jan Grudziński, and its new first officer, Lieutenant Andrzej Piasecki. That started with Grudziński's sabotage of the torpedo hoist on 16 September, which prevented the Estonians from removing the six aft torpedoes. Since it was a Sunday another could not be immediately acquired, and splicing the cable would have been a long job. Meanwhile, Boatswain Władysław Narkiewicz took a small boat around the harbour. Under the guise of fishing, he covertly measured the depth of the planned escape route. Another sailor sabotaged the submarine's mooring lines. The Soviet invasion of Poland commenced on 17 September.

On 18 September 1939, at around midnight, the portlights suffered an unexplained malfunction. Seizing the opportunity, Lieutenant Grudziński prepared the submarine for departure. The crew was forced to delay by the arrival of an Estonian officer. After a 30 minute inspection, he deemed nothing to be out of the ordinary and bid the Poles goodnight. The crew resumed with their plans. Two Estonian guards at the dock were lured aboard and non-violently taken prisoner, the lighting in the port was sabotaged and the mooring lines were cut with an axe. Both engines were started, and the submarine made her escape in the darkness.

Estonian spotlights began sweeping the harbour from buildings to the quay until they finally found Orzeł. The Estonians opened fire with machine guns and light artillery, which damaged the conning tower. Heavier guns supposedly failed to open fire for fear of damaging other ships. At the mouth of the harbour, the submarine briefly ran aground on a sandbar but quickly managed to get free and escape to the Baltic Sea.

=== At sea ===
Lieutenant Grudziński intended to seize the maps of a German vessel, as all of the navigational aids of Orzeł, except for a guide of Swedish lighthouses, had been confiscated. No German merchant ships were ever sighted, however. After three weeks of searching, it was decided to leave the Baltic and head for Britain. It took two days to pass through the heavily guarded entrance. The only references that the Poles had were the lighthouse guide and a rudimentary map that had been drawn by the navigation officer.

The German and Estonian press covering the incident first suggested that the two captured guards had possibly been killed by the Polish sailors. It later turned out that they had been released off the coast of the Swedish island of Gotland in a rubber dinghy and provided with clothing and food for their safe return home. The guards were also given 50 US dollars each, as the Polish crew believed that those "returning from the underworld deserve to travel first class only".

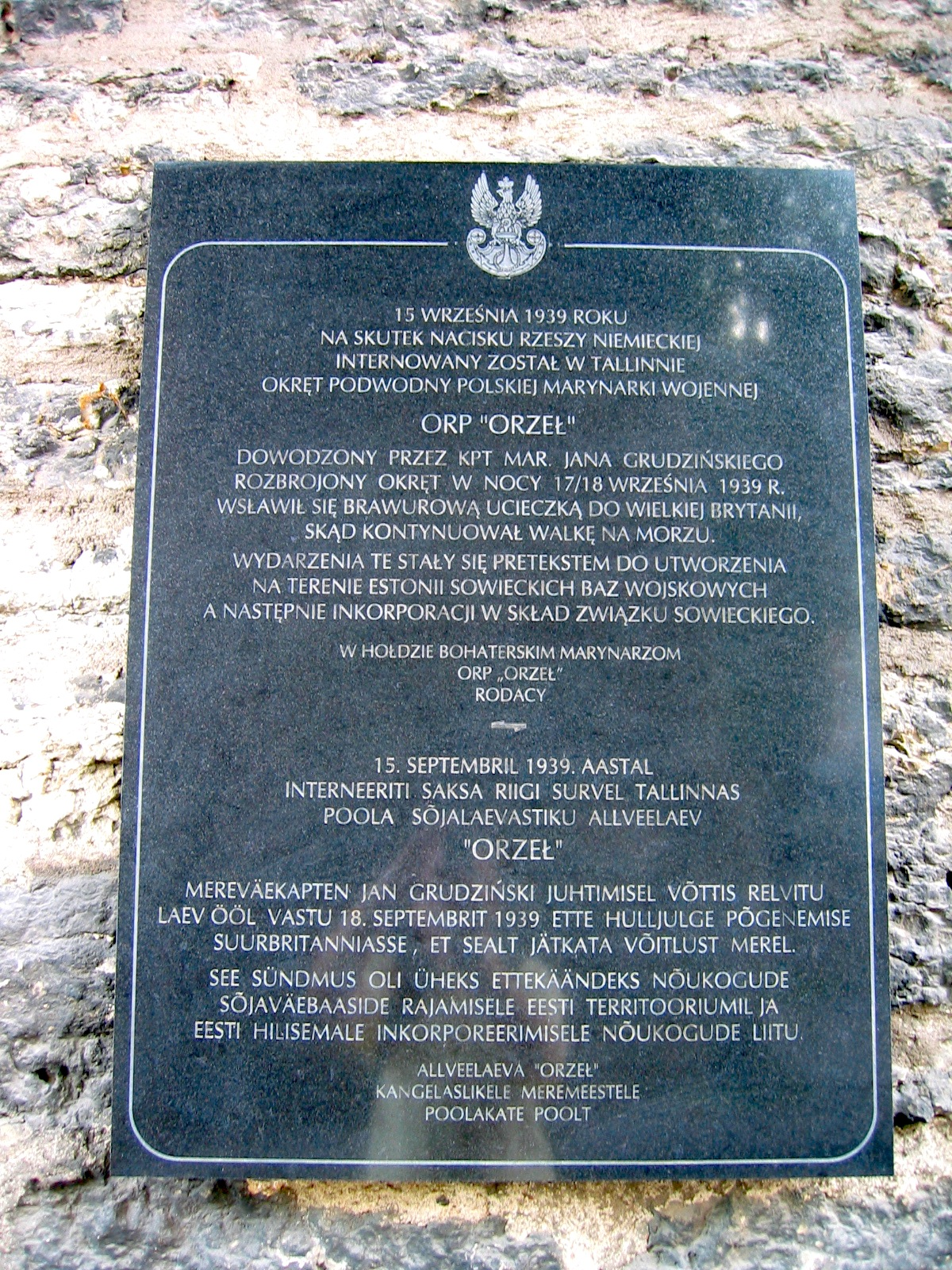
ORP Orzeł memorial plaque in the Estonian Maritime Museum, Tallinn

Orzeł arrived off the coast of Scotland on 14 October 1939. The crew sent out a signal in broken English, and a Royal Navy destroyer came out and escorted them into port. The arrival of Orzeł surprised the British Admiralty, which had long presumed the submarine to be lost. ORP Orzeł was subject to a refit and subsequently brought into service alongside the Royal Navy in the 2nd Submarine Flotilla in mid-January 1940 to patrol the North Sea. On 23 May 1940, Orzeł departed on its seventh patrol in the central North Sea; on 8 June the submarine was officially declared lost.

=== Diplomatic crisis and aftermath ===
After the submarine's escape from Tallinn, the Telegraph Agency of the Soviet Union (TASS) "reported" that the Estonian government had "deliberately" allowed Orzeł to escape and that "other Polish submarines were hiding" in ports throughout the Baltic countries.

Joseph Stalin's Soviet Union, having invaded Poland on 17 September 1939, accused Estonia of conspiring with the Polish seamen along with "aiding them to escape" and challenged the neutrality of Estonia. Orzeł sank no enemy vessels during her journey from Estonia to the United Kingdom, but the Soviet government also blamed the Polish submarine and Estonia for the alleged loss of the Soviet 968 GRT tanker Metallist in Narva Bay in Estonian territorial waters on 26 September 1939. The Soviets demanded to be allowed to establish military bases on Estonian soil and threatened full-scale war if Estonia did not comply with the ultimatum. Accusations related to the submarine incident served as a political cover for Stalin's actions, since in the secret clauses of the August 1939 German-Soviet Pact Nazi Germany already provided implicit approval for the Soviet takeover of Estonia, Latvia and Finland. The Orzeł incident was used by Stalin to force the "treaty of defence and mutual assistance" on Estonia, which was signed on 28 September 1939 and allowed the Soviets to establish several military bases on Estonian soil. The Soviet troops occupied the whole territory of Estonia in June 1940.

== See also ==
- The Eagle (1959 film)
