= Timeline of the Molotov–Ribbentrop Pact =

The timeline of the Molotov–Ribbentrop Pact is a chronology of events, including Molotov–Ribbentrop Pact negotiations, leading up to, culminating in, and resulting from the Molotov–Ribbentrop Pact. The Treaty of Non-aggression between Nazi Germany and the Soviet Union was signed in the early hours of 24 August 1939, but was dated 23 August.

== Prelude ==
- 3 March 1918: The Treaty of Brest-Litovsk between Soviet Russia and the Central Powers is signed.
- 11 November 1918: The armistice between the Allies and Germany ends the First World War on the Western Front. After Germany's collapse, British, French and Japanese troops intervene in the Russian Civil War.
- 28 June 1919: The Treaty of Versailles formally ends the First World War.
- 16 April 1922: The Treaty of Rapallo between Germany and Soviet Russia renounces all territorial and financial claims against the other. A secret annex allows Germany to train its military in Soviet territory.
- 24 April 1926: The Treaty of Berlin between the Soviet Union and Germany is signed, guaranteeing neutrality in the event of an attack on the other by a third party. A renewal is signed in 1931, ratified in 1933.
- 28 September 1926: The Soviet–Lithuanian Non-Aggression Pact is signed.
- 21 January 1932: The Soviet–Finnish Non-Aggression Pact signed.
- 5 February 1932: The Soviet–Latvian Non-Aggression Pact is signed.
- 4 May 1932: The Soviet–Estonian Non-Aggression Pact is signed.
- 25 July 1932: The Soviet–Polish Non-Aggression Pact is signed.
- 30 January 1933: Adolf Hitler comes to power.
- 26 January 1934: The German–Polish Non-Aggression Pact is signed.
- 2 May 1935: The Franco-Soviet Treaty of Mutual Assistance is signed.
- 18 June 1935: The Anglo-German Naval Agreement is signed.
- 25 November 1936: The Anti-Comintern Pact is signed between Nazi Germany and the Empire of Japan. The pact is against the Communist International in general, and the Soviet Union in particular.
- 12 March 1938: Germany annexes Austria in the Anschluss.
- 29 September 1938: The Munich Agreement permits German annexation of Czechoslovakia's Sudetenland.
- 15–16 March 1939: Germany invades Czechoslovakia; the Protectorate of Bohemia and Moravia is established.

== Diplomacy in 1939 ==
- 10 March 1939: Stalin's speech to the 18th Party Congress.
- March 1939: Tripartite talks begin between the Soviet Union, United Kingdom and France.
- 31 March 1939: United Kingdom and France offer guarantees of independence to Poland, Belgium, Romania, Greece, and Turkey.
- 28 April 1939: Hitler denounces the 1934 German–Polish Non-Aggression Pact and the 1935 Anglo-German Naval Agreement.
- 3 May 1939: Stalin replaces Foreign Minister Maxim Litvinov with Vyacheslav Molotov.
- 22 May 1939: The Pact of Steel (the Pact of Friendship and Alliance between Germany and Italy) is signed.
- 7 June 1939: The German–Estonian Non-Aggression Pact and the German–Latvian Non-Aggression Pact are signed.
- 19 August 1939: The German–Soviet Commercial Agreement is signed.
- 23 August 1939: The Molotov–Ribbentrop Pact is signed.

== Aftermath ==
- 25 August 1939: The Anglo-Polish alliance is signed.
- 1 September 1939: Germany invades Poland.
- 3 September 1939: United Kingdom and France declare war on Germany
- 17 September 1939: The Soviet Union invades Poland.
- 28 September 1939: The German–Soviet Boundary and Friendship Treaty is signed.
- 28 September 1939: The Soviet–Estonian Mutual Assistance Treaty is signed.
- 5 October 1939: The Soviet–Latvian Mutual Assistance Treaty is signed.
- 10 October 1939: The Soviet–Lithuanian Mutual Assistance Treaty is signed.
- 30 November 1939: The Soviet Union invades Finland, starting the Winter War, lasting 105 days.
- 12 March 1940: The Moscow Peace Treaty between the Soviet Union and Finland is signed, ending the Winter War.
- June–August 1940: The Soviet Union occupies and annexes the Baltic states.
- 28 June 1940: The Soviet Union occupies Bessarabia and Northern Bukovina.
- 27 September 1940: The Tripartite Pact between Germany, Italy and Japan is signed.
- 12–15 November 1940: Molotov's visit to Berlin.
- 13 April 1941: The Soviet–Japanese Neutrality Pact is signed.
- 22 June 1941: Germany assaults the Soviet Union.

== See also ==
- Timeline of the occupation of the Baltic states
- Timeline of the Winter War
