= SS Rio de Janeiro =

German cargo steamship

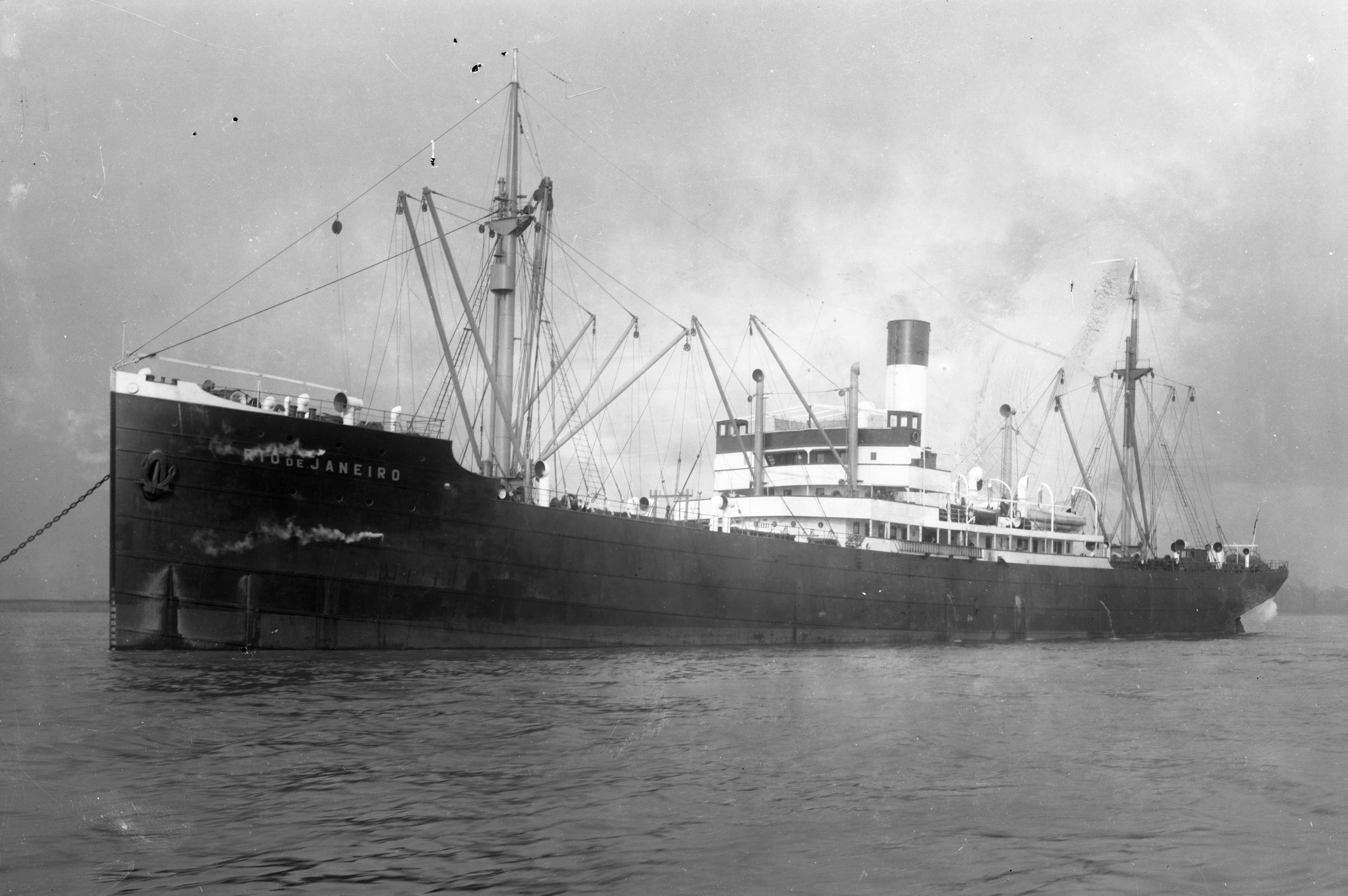
- Rio de Janeiro

History
- Name: 1914: Santa Ines; 1921: Rio de Janeiro
- Namesake: 1914: Agnes of Rome; 1921: Rio de Janeiro
- Owner: Hamburg Südamerikanische DG
- Operator: 1914–40: Hamburg Süd; 1940: Kriegsmarine
- Port of registry: Hamburg
- Builder: Bremer Vulkan, Vegesack
- Yard number: 573
- Launched: 3 April 1914
- Completed: 1914
- Out of service: 8 April 1940
- Identification: 1914–33: code letters RBVH; 1934–40 call sign: DHUC
- Fate: Sunk by torpedo, 8 April 1940

General characteristics
- Class & type: Santa-class cargo and passenger ship
- Tonnage: 5,261 GRT, 3,194 NRT
- Length: 401.9 ft (122.5 m)
- Beam: 55.0 ft (16.8 m)
- Depth: 27.8 ft (8.5 m)
- Decks: 3
- Installed power: 380 NHP
- Propulsion: Triple-expansion engine, single screw
- Speed: 10 kn (19 km/h)
- Crew: 50

SS Rio de Janeiro was a German cargo steamship owned by the Hamburg Südamerikanische shipping company and registered in Hamburg. She was built as Santa Ines in 1914 and renamed Rio de Janeiro in 1921. Until World War II she carried passengers and freight between Germany and South America.

On 7 March 1940 Nazi Germany's Kriegsmarine requisitioned her to carry troops and equipment before Operation Weserübung, the invasion of Norway and Denmark, began on 9 April 1940. En route to Bergen, it was stopped by the Polish submarine Orzel and sunk by torpedoes.

== Building and identification ==
Bremer Vulkan built Santa Ines, launching her on 3 April 1914 and completing her later that year. Her registered length was 401.9 ft (122.5 m), her beam was 55.0 ft (16.8 m), and her depth was 27.8 ft (8.5 m). She had three decks, and her tonnages were 5,261 GRT and 3,194 NRT. She had a single screw, driven by a three-cylinder triple-expansion engine that was rated at 380 NHP.

Hamburg Süd registered the ship in Hamburg. Her code letters were RBVH until 1933–34, when they were superseded by the call sign DHUC.

== Invasion of Norway ==
The secret plan for the ship was to arrive at Bergen immediately after German troops had captured the city. Aboard Rio de Janeiro were 50 crew and 330 soldiers. Her cargo consisted of six 2 cm FlaK 30 and four 10.5 cm FlaK 38 anti-aircraft guns, 73 horses, 71 vehicles, and 292 tons of provisions, animal feed, fuel and ammunition.

== Sinking ==
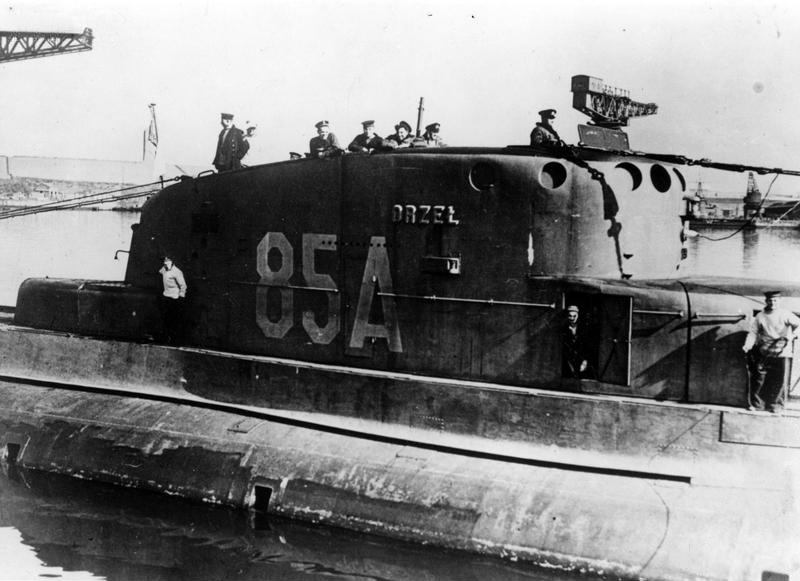
The conning tower of the Polish submarine Orzeł (in 1940)

The ship left Stettin on 6 April 1940 at 3 AM. Two days later, at 11.15, less than a day before the attack on Norway began, a surfaced submarine was sighted off Lillesand. At first it was thought to be a German submarine, but it turned out to be the Polish submarine ORP Orzeł, operating with the British Royal Navy. It had 85 A painted on the tower. The submarine signalled for Rio de Janeiro to stop, which she did. The Polish submarine commander, Lieutenant Jan Grudziński, then ordered the ship to surrender or be sunk, but Rio de Janeiro did not reply.

The Polish submarine then torpedoed the ship, which took on water and began sinking. The crew and soldiers on board began to jump into the sea. Grudziński informed the British Admiralty about the sinking of this northbound transport ship with German troops.

At 12.00, an aircraft from the Royal Norwegian Navy Air Service started circling around the sinking ship. At 12.50, from a submerged position, the submarine torpedoed the ship a second time. The torpedo hit the ammunition store, causing an explosion. About 180 men survived the sinking and were rescued from the sea and taken by local vessels to Lillesand and Kristiansand. About 200 died.

== Norwegian authorities notified ==
Survivors told Norwegian officials that the ship's destination had been Bergen. The facts that there were horses aboard and that many of the dead and survivors were wearing military uniforms caused an alert to the central authorities. However, the government did not realize that a German invasion was imminent. The news reached the Admiralty but was not communicated to the Commander of the British Home Fleet which was trying to intercept German naval forces.

== The wreck ==
The exact location of the wreck of Rio de Janeiro was unknown for many years. Fishermen over the years caught parts from the wreck in their fishing nets in this area, and the Royal Norwegian Navy tried to find the wreck.

In June 2015, more than 75 years after the torpedoing, the wreck was finally located by a Norwegian diving company at about 135 metres (443 ft) depth off Lillesand. The wreck is considered a war memorial and thus protected by Norwegian law.

== Bibliography ==
- Taraldsen, Kristen (1998). Ti i krig (in Norwegian). Fædrelandsvennen. ISBN 82-90581-28-9.
- Tallaksen, Kristen (1984). Da krigen kom til Lillesand. Den dramatiske Torpederingen av Rio de Janeiro 8. April 1940 (in Norwegian). Fædrelandsvennen. ISBN 82-90581-00-9.
- Herbert, Carl (1934). Kriegsfahrten deutscher Handelsschiffe (in German). Hamburg: Broschek & Co..
- Kludas, Arnold (1976). Die Schiffe der Hamburg-Süd 1871 bis 1951 [The Ships of Hamburg-Sud 1871 to 1951] (in German). Oldenburg: Gerhard Stalling Verlag. ISBN 3-7979-1875-5.
