= Falsifiers of History =

Book published by the Soviet Information Bureau

Falsifiers of History (Historical Survey)
- Author: Sovinformburo; Joseph Stalin (partially)
- Original title: Fal’sifkatory istorii (Istoricheskaya spravka)
- Translator: Sovinformburo
- Language: Russian
- Published: 1948 Moscow: Gospolitizdat (Russian 1st ed.); 1948 Moscow: Foreign Languages Publishing House (English 1st. ed)
- Publication place: Soviet Union
- Media type: Print
- Pages: 65
- OCLC: 155723998

Falsifiers of History is a book, first published by the Soviet Information Bureau, edited and partially re-written by Joseph Stalin, in response to documents made public in January 1948 regarding German–Soviet relations before and after the Molotov–Ribbentrop Pact.

== Background on Nazi–Soviet Relations documents ==
In 1948, the U.S. State Department published a collection of documents titled Nazi–Soviet Relations, 1939–1941: Documents from the Archives of The German Foreign Office, which contained documents recovered from the Foreign Office of Nazi Germany. The collection included documents from, and about conversations with, Soviet officials during negotiations regarding the Molotov–Ribbentrop Pact, a 1939 agreement between the Soviet Union and Germany, along with the related 1939 German–Soviet Commercial Agreement. It also included the publication of the "Secret Additional Protocol" of that Pact, which divided eastern Europe into "spheres of influence" between Germany and the Soviet Union, executed weeks before each country's subsequent invasion of Poland. The collection further contained "Secret Supplementary Protocols" to agreements between the countries, discussions regarding the 1940 German–Soviet Commercial Agreement, discussions of the Soviet Union potentially becoming an Axis Power and other German–Soviet negotiations and discussions.

== Publication ==
Falsifiers was published in response to the documents made public in Nazi–Soviet Relations. Joseph Stalin became personally involved in editing the work after receiving a translation of the Nazi–Soviet Relations document collection. On February 3, 1948, Stalin was presented with a typescript titled Reply to Slanderers. Stalin changed the title to Falsifiers of History (Historical Reports). Stalin personally edited the book, including striking and re-writing whole sections by handwritten modification.

Falsifiers originally appeared as a series of articles in Pravda in February 1948. It was subsequently published in numerous languages and distributed worldwide. Separately, the Soviet Union later published a collection of documents it captured from German archives titled Documents and Materials Relating to the Eve of the Second World War.

== Themes and issues ==
Falsifiers pointedly ignored Soviet relations with Germany, making no attempt to directly counter or deal with the documents published in Nazi–Soviet Relations. Rather, the main theme of the booklet is Western culpability for the outbreak of war in 1939. It argues that "Western powers" aided Nazi rearmament and aggression, including that American bankers and industrialists provided capital for the growth of German war industries, while deliberately encouraging Hitler to expand eastward. It depicted the Soviet Union as striving to negotiate a collective security against Hitler, while being thwarted by double-dealing Anglo–French appeasers who, despite appearances, had no intention of a Soviet alliance and were secretly negotiating with Berlin.

Falsifiers casts the Munich Agreement, not just as Anglo–French short-sightedness or cowardice, but as a "secret" agreement that was "a highly important phase in their policy aimed at goading the Hitlerite aggressors against the Soviet Union." Falsifiers also included the claim that during the Pact's operation Stalin rejected Hitler's offer to divide the world, without mentioning the Soviet counteroffer to Germany's offer to join the Axis. The parties never reached agreement on Axis entry. Stalin's account in Falsifiers was repeated in Soviet historical texts until the Soviet Union's dissolution. Regarding Soviet–German relations after the Molotov–Ribbentrop Pact, Falsifiers main theme frames Soviet actions as a legitimate attempt to build up an "Eastern front" to defend against inevitable Nazi aggression.

Falisifiers' characterization of Western policy as anti-Communist, anti-Soviet, and pro-Nazi had been a prominent theme of Soviet propaganda before the Second World War, and such rhetoric more vigorously reemerged during the Cold War.

== Importance ==
Soviet publications before the revelation of documents in Nazi–Soviet Relations had avoided discussing the Soviet–German pact. Accordingly, Falsifiers is novel because it is a first frank Soviet discussion of the German–Soviet pact in a publication. In addition, because Falsifiers was personally and extensively edited by Stalin, at the very least, it provides unique insight into the view of events that he was keen to publicize.

The book provides insight into Stalin's thinking and calculations in the autumn of 1940. In analyzing the text of Falsifiers surrounding Soviet–German talks regarding the potential entry of the Soviet Union as an Axis Power, historian Geoffrey Roberts argues that there is no reason that Stalin would not have signed a four-power pact if Germany accepted his November offer.

According to Soviet diplomat Victor Israelyan, the book "certainly did nothing to disprove the existence of Soviet-German cooperation in the first years of World War II, a cooperation that to a certain degree assisted Hitler's plan". According to Stalin's daughter, Svetlana Alliluyeva, she "remembered her father saying after [the war]: Together with the Germans we would have been invincible".

== Contents ==
=== Chapters and sections ===
The arrangement of chapters and section titles is as follows:

Introduction

Documents Captured in Germany
A Distorted Picture of Events

Chapter 1: How Preparation for German Aggression Was Commenced

Dawes Reparation Plan
A Share In The Profits
The Golden Rain Of American Dollars
Factors Which Helped To Unleash Hitler Aggression
A Soviet Union Alone Pursued A Policy of Peace
The Soviet Principle of Collective Security
Western Powers Rejection Of Collective Security Pact

Chapter 2: Not a Struggle Against German Aggression, But A Policy Of Isolating the U.S.S.R.

Hitler-Halifax Conversation
Hitler's Annexationist Actions Were Encouraged
The Soviet Union's Warning
The Munich Deal
The True Meaning Of Munich
Handing Over Czechoslovakia to Hitler
"Uniting Europe Without Russia"

Chapter 3: Isolation of the Soviet Union: The Soviet–German Non-Aggression Pact

Negotiations Between Britain and France And The Soviet Union
A Position of Inequality For The USSR
No Obligations Whatever Towards the USSR
The Soviet Proposal
Spurring Hitler To Attack the U.S.S.R
Military Negotiation Also Futile
Britain's Back-Stage Negotiation With Germany
Surrender of Poland To Hitler
U.S.S.R.'s Non-Aggression Pact With Germany
The Best Possible Course

Chapter 4: Creation of the "Eastern Front". Germany's Attack on the U.S.S.R., The Anti-Hitler Coalition And The Question of Inter-Allied Obligations

Creation Of The Eastern Front
Finnish Government Declines Soviet Union's Friendly Proposal
Safeguarding Security of Leningrad, Murmansk
Britain and France Supply Finland With Arms
A Plan For Military Operations Against the U.S.S.R.
A Turn In the Development Of The War
Fiasco of Policy of Appeasement
Germany Attacks the U.S.S.R.
The Anti-Hitler Coalition
What Actually Happened in Berlin!
Sounding The Position Of The Hitler Government
Negotiations Between U.S.A. and Germany in 1943
Postponing the Opening of the Second Front
U.S.S.R.'s Assistance To Its Ally
J. V. Stalin's Message to Winston Churchill On Preparation of Offensive
A Blow of Unparalleled Force

=== Statements responding to then Cold War issues ===
On Nazi–Soviet Relations	Thus, no doubt is left as to the true purpose for which the collection of documents on the relations between the U.S.S.R. and Germany in the period 1939–1941 was published in the U.S.A. This was not done for the purpose of giving an objective exposition of historical events, but in order to present a distorted picture of events, to heap lies on the Soviet Union, to slander it and to undermine the international influence of the Soviet Union as a truly democratic and staunch fighter against aggressive, anti-democratic forces.
Introduction, Page 6
On Nazi–Soviet Relations	The attack on the progressive elements inside the U.S.A. is undoubtedly aimed at undermining their influence in view of the Presidential elections to be held in the autumn of 1948.
Introduction, Page 7
On Nazi–Soviet Relations	The American falsifiers and their British and French associates are trying to create the impression that the preparations for German aggression which developed into the Second World War were begun in the autumn of 1939.
Chapter 1, Page 9
	The Soviet Union alone was doing everything possible in order to block the Fascist aggressors' way.
Chapter 1, Page 15
On Maxim Litvinov	In order to confuse the reader and at the same time to slander the Soviet Government, Neal Stanford, the American journalist, asserts that the Soviet government was opposed to collective security, that M. M. Lltvinov was dismissed and replaced by V. M. Molotov in the post of Peoples Commissar of Foreign Affairs because he had been pursuing a policy of consolidating collective. security. One could hardly imagine anything more stupid than this fantastic assertion.
Chapter 1, Page 16
	As far back as in 1937 it became perfectly clear that a big war was being hatched by Hitler with the direct connivance of Great Britain and France.
Chapter 2, Page 19
On the Munich Agreement	The true meaning of the Munich conspiracy was then and there exposed by J. V. Stalin, who said that " ... districts of Czechoslovakia were yielded to Germany as the price of undertaking to launch war on the Soviet Union .... "
Chapter 2, Page 27
On the Molotov–Ribbentrop Pact	It would be gross slander to assert that the conclusion of the Pact with the Hitlerites was part of the plan of the U.S.S.R.'s foreign policy.
Chapter 3, Page 44
On the Molotov–Ribbentrop Pact	The claptrap of the slanderers of all hues to the effect that the U.S.S.R. should in no case have allowed itself to conclude the Pact with the Germans can only be regarded as ridiculous.
Chapter 3, Page 45
On the Winter War	There could hardly be any doubt that the leading circles of Finland were in league with the Hitlerites, that they wanted to turn Finland into a springboard for Hitler Germany's attack on the U.S.S.R.
Chapter 4, Page 48
On the Winter War	Although by their whole policy with regard to the U.S.S.R. the Finnish ruling circles played into the hands of Hitler Germany, the Anglo–French bosses of the League of Nations immediately took the side of the Finnish Government, declared through the League of Nations that the U.S.S.R. was "the aggressor," and thereby openly approved and supported the war which the Finnish rulers started against the Soviet Union.
Chapter 4, Page 50
On the Winter War	In the war which the Finnish reactionaries started against the Soviet Union, Britain and France rendered the Finnish militarists every kind of assistance. The Anglo–French ruling circles kept inciting the Finnish Government to continue hostilities.
Chapter 4, Page 50
On the Occupation of the Baltic states	Pacts had been concluded with the Baltic States, but there were as yet no Soviet troops there capable of holding' the defenses.
Chapter 4, Page 52
On the Occupation of the Baltic states	Only enemies of democracy or people who had lost their senses could describe those actions of the Soviet Government as aggression.
Chapter 4, Page 54
On Soviet negotiations to become an Axis Power	As can be seen, this was a case of sounding out, of probing the position of the Hitler Government by the Soviet Government, which did not and could not end in any sort of agreement. Is it permissible for peace-loving States to practice such sounding of the enemy's position? Unquestionably it is.
Chapter 4, Page 58
	During the past war the Soviet Union set examples of such a truly allied attitude towards other countries, its comrades-in-arms in the struggle against the common enemy.
Chapter 4, Page 62
On Nazi–Soviet Relations	Naturally, the falsifiers of history and slanderers are called falsifiers and slanderers precisely because they do not entertain any respect for facts. They prefer to gossip and slander.
Chapter 4, Page 65
