= Timeline of the Winter War =

Chronology of 1939-1940 war between Finland and the USSR

The timeline of the Winter War is a chronology of events leading up to, culminating in, and resulting from the Winter War. The war began when the Soviet Union attacked Finland on 30 November 1939 and it ended 13 March 1940.

== Prelude ==
- 7 November 1917: Bolshevik revolution breaks out in Russia.
- 6 December 1917: Finland declares independence from Russia.
- 27 January 1918: Finnish Civil War between German-supported White Guards and Soviet-supported Red Guards.
- 21 March 1918: Finnish nationalist volunteers launch the military Viena expedition, attempting to annex Karelia to Finland; the expedition ultimately failed.
- 15 May 1918: Finnish Civil War ends with a victory by the White Guards under C.G.E. Mannerheim.
- 23 January 1919: The Finnish population in Ingria rebels from Soviet Russia, creating the Republic of North Ingria, which seeks to join Finland. The short-lived state is later reincorporated into Russia.
- 21 April 1919: Finnish armed nationalist volunteers launch the Aunus expedition, attempting to annex Karelia to Finland. Due to lack of significant support from the local population and Soviet resistance, the expedition was ultimately defeated. Finnish historiography does not consider these expeditions and rebellions to be wars, while Russian historiography considers them as military interventions, calling them the "First Soviet–Finnish War."
- 17 July 1919: Finland adopts a democratic constitution.
- 14 October 1920: Soviet Russia and Finland sign the Treaty of Tartu, which provides for mutual de jure recognition and a settlement of the border. The harbor of Petsamo is ceded to Finland in exchange for the parishes of Repola and Porajärvi, which had briefly seceded from Russia to Finland previously.
- October 1921: The East Karelian Uprising begins against Soviet Russia. Armed Finnish volunteers soon join to take part in the fighting. The uprising is ultimately defeated; the rebels cross the border to refuge in Finland.
- 21 January 1932: The Soviet Union and Finland negotiate a non-aggression pact.
- 24 August 1939: Russo-German non-aggression pact signed. Secret protocol places the Baltic region and Finland within the Soviet Union's sphere of interest.
- 1 September 1939: Nazi Germany invades Poland.
- 17 September 1939: The Soviet Union invades Poland.
- 22 September 1939: Estonian foreign minister invited to Moscow.
- 29 September 1939: Soviet–Estonian mutual assistance pact signed.
- 1 October 1939: Latvian foreign minister invited to Moscow.
- 3 October 1939: Lithuanian foreign minister invited to Moscow.
- 5 October 1939: Soviet–Latvian mutual assistance pact signed. The Soviet Union invites Finns to negotiate territorial adjustments.
- 9 October 1939: Finland orders a gradual military mobilization under the guise of additional refresher training.
- 10 October 1939: Soviet–Lithuanian Mutual Assistance Treaty signed.
- 11–12 October 1939: Finnish delegation meets V.M. Molotov and J.V. Stalin in Moscow, and receives demands of concessions. The Soviet demands include the secession of territory in the Karelian Isthmus, islands in the Gulf of Finland, and the Rybachy Peninsula, as well as the lease of a naval base at Hanko. In return, they offer to secede the municipalities of Repola and Porajärvi, making up twice as much territory as their demands of Finland. The offer divides the Finnish government, who ultimately reject it.
- 23 October 1939: The Finnish make a counteroffer, offering the town of Terijoki, much smaller than Soviet demands.
- 31 October 1939: Molotov makes a speech before the Supreme Soviet of the Soviet Union, publicly announcing the Soviet demands and offers.
- 13 November 1939: The Finnish delegation returns home, ending negotiations.
- 26 November 1939: The Soviets stage the Shelling of Mainila, bombarding a Soviet village in order to obtain a pretext for war against Finland.
- 28 November 1939: The Soviets withdrawn from the non-aggression pact, using their staged incident as a pretext.

== 1939 ==
=== November ===
- 30 November 1939: Helsinki bombed, and Soviet troops cross Finnish border.

=== December ===
- 1 December 1939: The puppet government "Finnish Democratic Republic" is founded.
- 3 December 1939: Finland makes appeal for intervention by the League of Nations.
- 7 December 1939: Soviets reach main line of Finnish resistance on the Karelian Isthmus.
- 12 December 1939: Finns win the Battle of Tolvajärvi.
- 14 December 1939: The Soviet Union expelled from League of Nations.
- 23 December 1939: Finns organized unsuccessful counterattack.

== 1940 ==
=== January ===
- 7 January 1940: Finns win the Battle of Raate road.
- 8 January 1940: Finns win the Battle of Suomussalmi.
- 29 January 1940: The Soviets abandon their puppet Terijoki government and recognize the Finnish government as the legitimate government of Finland. The Soviets inquire what land Finland would be willing to cede as part of a peace deal.

=== February ===
- 1 February 1940: Soviets start all-out offensive on the Karelian Isthmus.
- 5 February 1940: Britain and France agree to intervene in Scandinavia.
- 11 February 1940: Soviets score decisive breakthrough of Mannerheim Line.
- 12 February 1940: Finns seek peace terms.

=== March ===
- 1–5 March 1940: Fighting in and around city of Viipuri (Vyborg).
- 9 March 1940: Finns retreat from last toeholds in Gulf of Viipuri.
- 12 March 1940: Moscow Peace Treaty signed in Moscow.
- 13 March 1940: Cease-fire goes into effect.

== Aftermath ==
- 9 April 1940: Germany invades Denmark and Norway.
- 15 April 1940: Allies send troops to Norway; the nation is ultimately conquered by Germany.
- June–August 1940: The Soviet Union occupies and annexes the Baltic states.
- 18 August 1940: After the Germans obtain troop transit rights through Finland, the first German troops arrive in the port of Vaasa. Ultimately, five German army divisions deploy in Northern Finland for the planned invasion of Soviet Russia.
- January 1941: The Soviets make demands regarding the mining district and port of Petsamo, rejected by Finland with the support of Germany.
- January 1941: The Germans inform Finland of their plans for their invasion of the Soviet Union; military leaders of the two countries begin planning together for the invasion.
- 15 June 1941: The Finnish army begins mobilization in preparation for an attack on the Soviet Union in conjunction with Germany.
- 21 June 1941: Finnish troops concentrate at the Finnish–Soviet border.
- 22 June 1941: Germany launches an invasion of the Soviet Union, breaking its non-aggression treaty without warning. The Finnish immediately occupy the demilitarized Åland islands. German troops advance into Petsamo.
- 25 June 1941: Soviets launch a retaliatory aerial strike within Finnish territory, Finland declares war, and the Continuation War officially begins.

== See also ==
- List of wars involving Finland
- Timeline of the occupation of the Baltic states
- Timeline of the Molotov–Ribbentrop Pact

== Bibliography ==
- Leskinen, Jari; Juutilainen, Antti, eds. (1999). Talvisodan pikkujättiläinen (in Finnish) (1st ed.). Werner Söderström Osakeyhtiö. p. 976. ISBN 951-0-23536-9.
- Trotter, William R. (2002) [1991]. The Winter War: The Russo-Finnish War of 1939–40 (5th ed.). London: Aurum Press. ISBN 1-85410-881-6.
