= Timeline of the occupation of the Baltic states =

Chronological overview of military occupation of Estonia, Latvia and Lithuania

The timeline of the occupation of the Baltic states lists key events in the military occupation of the three countries – Estonia, Latvia and Lithuania – by the Soviet Union and by Nazi Germany during World War II.

== 1939 ==
- 20 March 1939, German ultimatum to Lithuania was an oral ultimatum presented to Juozas Urbšys, foreign minister of Lithuania, by Joachim von Ribbentrop, foreign minister of Nazi Germany. The Germans demanded that Lithuania give up the Klaipėda region (Memelland), or the Wehrmacht would invade Lithuania.
- 23 August 1939, Molotov–Ribbentrop Pact (Nazi-Soviet Alliance) signed. A secret protocol of the pact places Estonia, Latvia, and Finland in Soviet sphere of interest, Lithuania in Germany's sphere of influence. Poland was effectively divided between Stalin and Hitler.
- 1 September 1939, Nazi Germany invades Poland. This event signifies the start of World War II in Europe.
- 14 September 1939, Polish submarine Orzeł enters Tallinn harbour (in then neutral Estonia), crew interned.
- 17 September 1939, Soviet Union invades Poland, cooperating with Germany as agreed in the Nazi-Soviet Alliance.
- 18 September 1939, the Polish submarine Orzeł escapes from Tallinn, sets course to Great Britain.
- 22 September 1939, Soviet army captures the region of Vilnius, which Poland had annexed from Lithuania in 1922.
- 24 September 1939, Stalin demands establishment of Soviet military bases in neutral Estonia, using the Orzeł incident as the pretext and threatening with war in case of noncompliance.
- 28 September 1939, Molotov–Ribbentrop Pact amended pursuant to German-Soviet Boundary and Friendship Treaty; most of Lithuania now falls into the Soviet "sphere of influence".
- 28 September 1939 Estonia submits to Soviet ultimatum, accepts military bases.
- 2 October 1939, Soviet Union demands establishment of military bases in neutral Latvia, threatening with invasion in case of noncompliance.
- 5 October 1939, Latvia submits to Soviet ultimatum, accepts military bases.
- 5 October 1939, Soviet Union begins negotiating with Finland for bases and territory exchanges.
- 10 October 1939, Lithuania accepts Soviet bases. Soviet Union transfers control over the Vilnius region to Lithuania.
- 18 October 1939, First Soviet units move into the designated military bases in Estonia.
- 13 November 1939, Finland rejects Soviet ultimatum.
- 30 November 1939, Soviet Union invades Finland. Winter War starts.
- 1 December 1939, Terijoki government, Soviet puppet government of Finland created in the Terijoki county captured from Finland.
- 14 December 1939, League of Nations expels Soviet Union for its illegal war against Finland.

== 1940 ==
- 29 January 1940, Soviet Union "forgets" Terijoki government.
- 13 March 1940 Winter War ends with Moscow Peace Treaty.
- 9 April 1940, Germany invades Denmark and Norway. Denmark surrenders almost immediately.
- 10 June 1940, Germany occupies Norway.
- 14 June 1940, Germany captures Paris.
- 14 June 1940 Soviet Union begins military air and naval blockade of Estonia.
- 14 June 1940, Soviet air force shoots down Finnish civilian passenger aircraft "Kaleva" flying en route from Tallinn to Helsinki.
- 14 June 1940 Soviet Union gives ultimatum to Lithuania to form a new government and allow free access for Red Army. The president of Lithuania, Antanas Smetona, proposes armed resistance. Failing to secure support from government or armed forces, he decides to leave the country, so that he could not be used to legalise the occupation.
- 15 June 1940 Soviet Union occupies Lithuania. President Smetona flees through Germany first to Switzerland then to USA, 1941, where he dies on 9 January 1944, in Cleveland. Prime Minister Antanas Merkys yields to Soviet demands, attempts to catch Smetona. Vladimir Dekanozov lands in Kaunas to supervise annexation of Lithuania.
- 15 June 1940, at 03:00 Soviet troops storm and capture Latvian border posts Masļenki and Smaiļi.
- 16 June 1940 Similar ultimatums were given to Estonia and Latvia.
- 16 June 1940, Prime Minister of Lithuania Antanas Merkys removes Antanas Smetona from the post of president and, contrary to Lithuanian constitution, assumes presidency himself.
- 17 June 1940 Estonia and Latvia submit to Soviet demands and are occupied. Prime Minister of Lithuania Antanas Merkys assigns Justas Paleckis as new prime minister, resigns and is arrested.
- 18 June 1940, Sweden and Germany sign treaty allowing transit of German soldiers from Norway using Swedish territory.
- 19 June 1940, A demonstration is staged in Vilnius in support of Soviet Army.
- 20 June 1940, New Latvian government of Moscow-approved ministers is formed.
- 21 June 1940, New Estonian government containing only left-wing activists is formed. Soviet Union arrange a number of Red Army backed support demonstrations in several cities.
- 22 June 1940, France surrenders to Nazi Germany.
- 8 July 1940, Sweden and Germany sign treaty allowing transit of German war material between Norway and ports in Southern Sweden.
- 11 July 1940, Baltic Military District is created by Soviet Union at Riga, on the territories of theoretically still independent states
- 14–15 July 1940, Mock elections in Estonia, Latvia and Lithuania, where non-communist candidates were disqualified, harassed and beaten. Results of Latvian "elections" published in advance in London by accident.
- 17 July 1940, The acting president of Lithuania, Antanas Merkys, is imprisoned and deported to Saratov, Soviet Union. He dies 5 March 1955.
- 21–23 July 1940 New Soviet-backed Estonian assembly transforms Estonia according to Soviet style, disregarding existing constitutional framework for government restructuring.
- 21 July 1940 New Latvian Saeima accepts wide nationalisation and Sovietisation decrees.
- 22 July 1940, The president of Latvia, Kārlis Ulmanis, is arrested and deported to Russia, never returning. He died in a prison in Krasnovodsk on 20 September 1942.
- 23 July 1940, Heads of Baltic diplomatic missions in London and Washington, D. C. protest against Soviet occupation and annexation of their countries.
- 23 July 1940 Sumner Welles' (US Under-Secretary of State) Declaration. United States applies the precedent of earlier Stimson Doctrine to Baltic states, pursuing a policy of non-recognition of annexation of the Baltic States de jure. Most other Western countries maintain similar position until restoration of Baltic states' sovereignty in 1991.
- 30 July 1940, The president of Estonia, Konstantin Päts, is imprisoned by NKVD and deported to Russia where he dies in the mental hospital of Kalinin on 18 January 1956.
- 3 August 1940 Soviet Union annexes Lithuania.
- 5 August 1940 Soviet Union annexes Latvia.
- 6 August 1940 Soviet Union annexes Estonia.
- 6 September 1940, Soviet Union acquires troop and material transfer rights from Finland between Hanko and Soviet border.
- 22 September 1940, Germany acquires troop and material transfer rights from Finland between northern Norway and ports of Gulf of Bothnia.
- 12 November 1940, Germany refuses Soviet Union demands for right to handle Finland as they will in negotiations in Berlin.
- 16 December 1940, The Russian SFSR penal code is applied to retroactively in Estonia, applying to acts committed before 21 June 1940.

== 1941 ==
- 10 January 1941, Soviet Union and Germany make an agreement for late resettlement of Baltic Germans from Latvia and Estonia.
- 14 June 1941 First mass deportations from Estonia (10 000), Latvia (15 000) and Lithuania (18 000) to sparsely populated areas of Siberia.
- 15 June 1941, The Governor of New York, Herbert Lehman, declares 15 June to be Baltic States Day.
- 22 June 1941 Germany enacts Operation Barbarossa, invades Soviet Union. In Soviet historiography, start of World War II as the Great Patriotic War.
- 24–25 June 1941 Soviet authorities massacre political prisoners in Rainiai, Lithuania.
- 25 June 1941 Continuation War breaks out between Finland and Soviet Union.
- 2 July 1941, General mobilisation is announced in the Soviet Union.
- 4 July 1941 Mass deportations from Estonian islands.
- 7 July 1941, German forces reach Southern Estonia.
- 9 July 1941 Soviet authorities leave Tartu after executing 199 political prisoners, among them women and at least one child.
- 10 July 1941, German forces reach Tartu.
- 17 July 1941 State Commissariat Ostland formed in Riga, Hinrich Lohse appointed State Commissar.
- 21 July 1941, Stalin seeks Churchill's de jure recognition of the Soviet Union's new western border, Churchill does not respond.
- 14 August 1941 Roosevelt and Churchill announce the Atlantic Charter.
- 31 August 1941, Mainland Baltics now fully occupied by German forces.
- 20 September 1941, Heinrich Himmler visits Estonia.
- 25 November 1941, US deputy Secretary of State, Sumner Welles, re-affirms the US policy in regard to non-recognition of Baltic annexation.
- 19 December 1941, Alfred Rosenberg, the German State Minister for the Occupied Eastern Territories, enacts civil labour obligation for all residents of the occupied territories aged 18–45.
- December 1941, Within six months of German occupation, 10 000 people, including 1 000 Estonian Jews, are either imprisoned or executed.

== 1942 ==
- 20 January 1942 Heydrich declares at the Wannsee Conference that Estonia is "Judenfrei".
- 25 February 1942 German law comes into force in Estonia, Latvia and Lithuania, but are only applied to ethnic Germans.
- 16 March 1942 Goebbels writes in his diary that the Baltic people are naïve to believe that the Germans will allow them to re-establish national governments.
- 30 March 1942 Himmler proposes plan to Germanise the Eastern Territories including establishing German settlements after the war.
- 20 May 1942 Molotov visits London, Great Britain refuses to recognise the legality of the new western border of the Soviet Union.

== See also ==
- Timeline of the Winter War
- Timeline of the Molotov–Ribbentrop Pact
