= ORP Orzeł (1938) =

Polish World War II submarine

Coordinates: 54°59′N 1°00′E

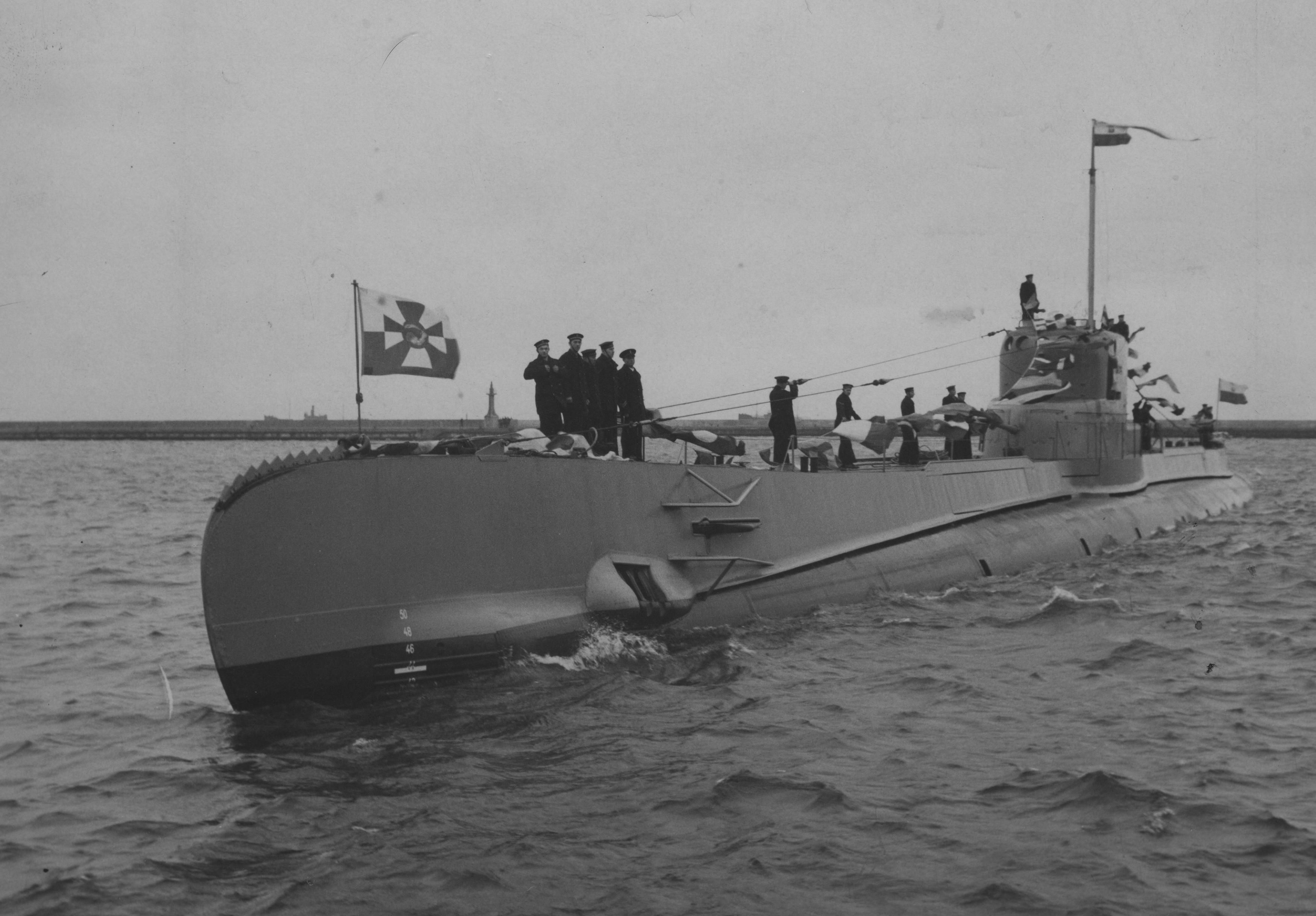
- ORP Orzeł arrives in the port of Gdynia

History

Poland
- Name: ORP Orzeł
- Namesake: Eagle
- Builder: De Schelde, Netherlands
- Laid down: 14 August 1936
- Launched: 15 January 1938
- Commissioned: 2 February 1939
- Fate: Missing since 23 May 1940, presumed sunk

General characteristics
- Class & type: Orzeł-class submarine
- Displacement: 1,110, surfaced; 1,473, submerged
- Length: 84.00 m (275 ft 7 in)
- Beam: 6.7 m (22 ft 0 in)
- Draught: 4.17 m (13 ft 8 in)
- Speed: 19.4 knots (35.9 km/h; 22.3 mph), surfaced; 9 kn (17 km/h; 10 mph), submerged
- Complement: 60
- Armament: 1 × Bofors wz.25 105 mm (4.1 in) gun; 1 × double Bofors wz.36 40 mm (1.6 in) AA gun; 1 × Hotchkiss 13.2 mm (0.52 in) HMG; 12 × 533 mm (21.0 in) / 550 mm (22 in) torpedo launchers (4 aft, 4 rudder, 4 waist); 20 torpedoes

ORP Orzeł (Polish: "eagle") was an Orzeł class submarine of the Polish Navy that served during World War II. Built in the Netherlands for the Polish navy, it entered service just before the beginning of the war. Escaping internment in Estonia, Orzel reached the UK and was assigned to a Royal Navy flotilla and patrolled the North Sea. In June 1940, Orzel failed to return to base and was declared lost, probably having hit a mine.

== Construction ==
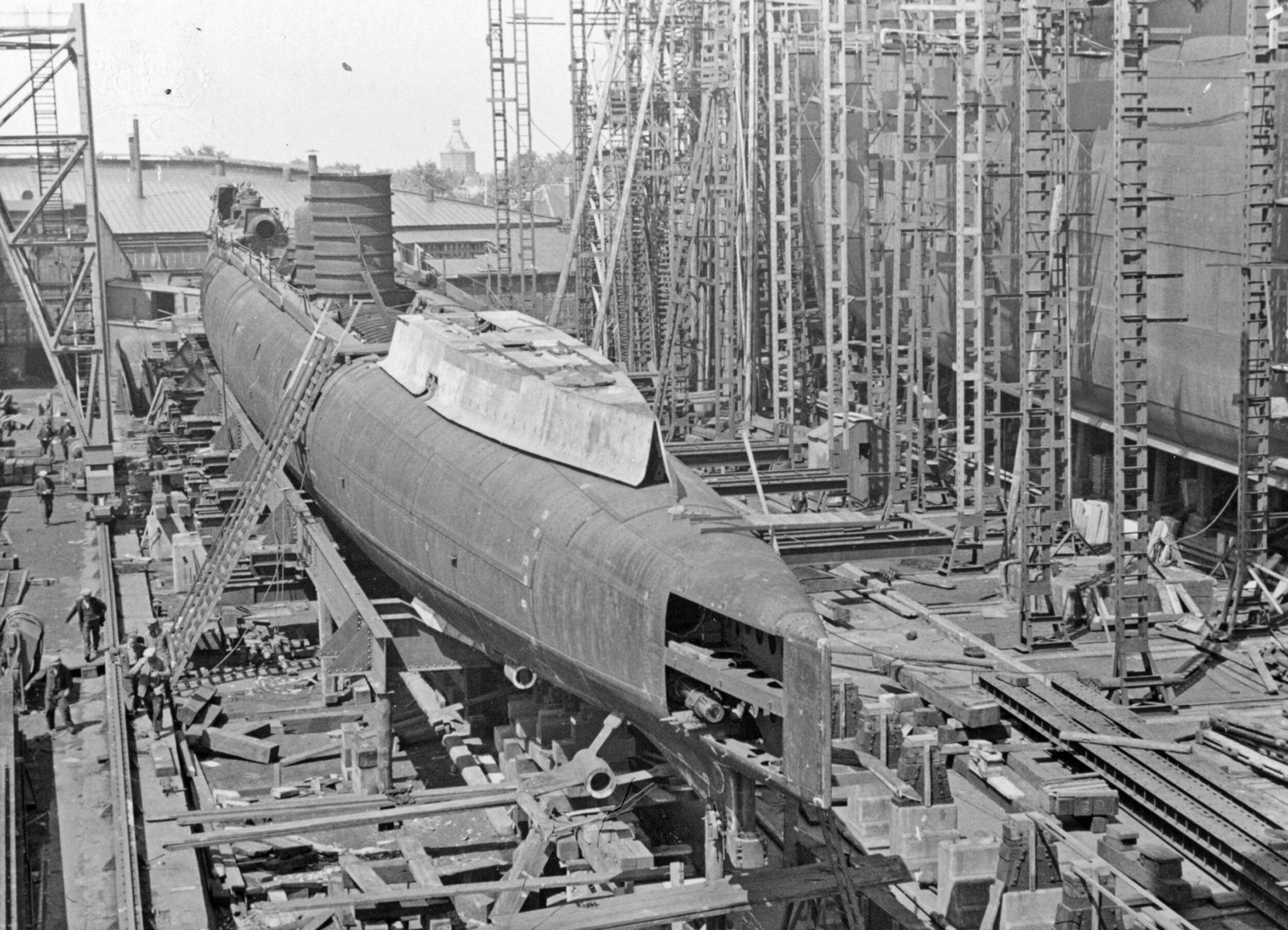
Orzeł under construction at the Dutch shipyards in Vlissingen.

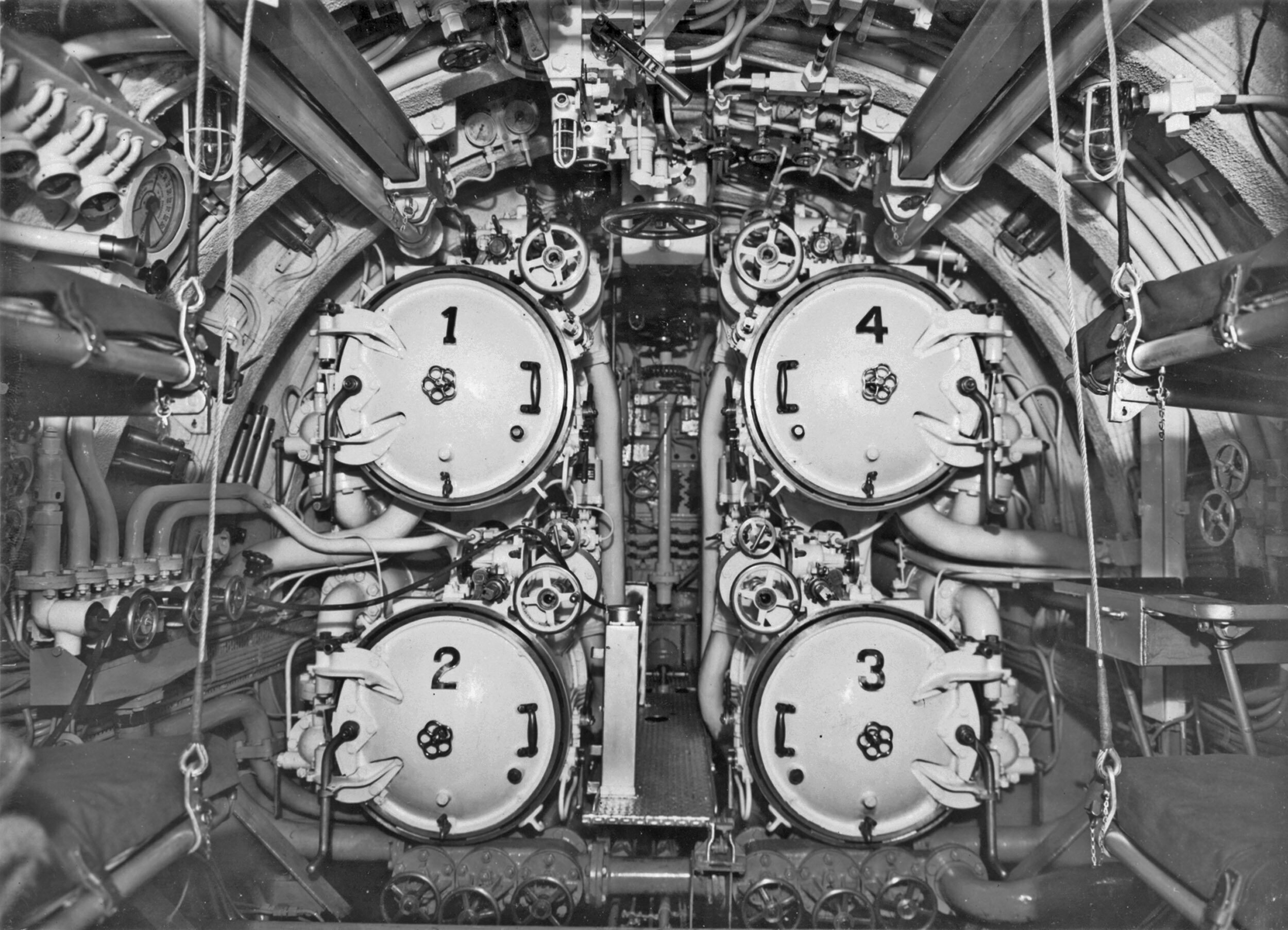
The bow torpedo room

Orzeł was laid down 14 August 1936 at the Dutch shipyard De Schelde, as Job No. 205; launched on 15 January 1938, and commissioned on 2 February 1939. She was a modern design (designed by the joint venture of Polish and Dutch engineers), albeit quite large for the shallow waters of the Baltic Sea.

== World War II ==
=== Polish Campaign ===
At the beginning of the German invasion of Poland Orzeł was docked in Oksywie. As per the Worek Plan, the submarine was deployed on patrol in a designated strategic zone of the Baltic Sea. The crew received orders to attack the pre-dreadnought Schleswig-Holstein, should it leave Danzig. With the situation rapidly deteriorating, Orzel abandoned its sector on 4 September and began to withdraw into the Baltic Sea. The submarine was attacked by the German minesweepers M3 and M4 and was damaged but evaded destruction that evening.

=== Escape to Britain ===
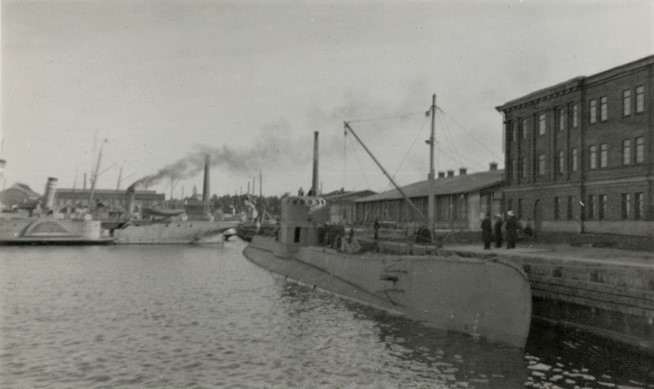
The interned Orzeł before its escape (the "Orzeł incident") in the Port of Tallinn, Estonia (September 1939)

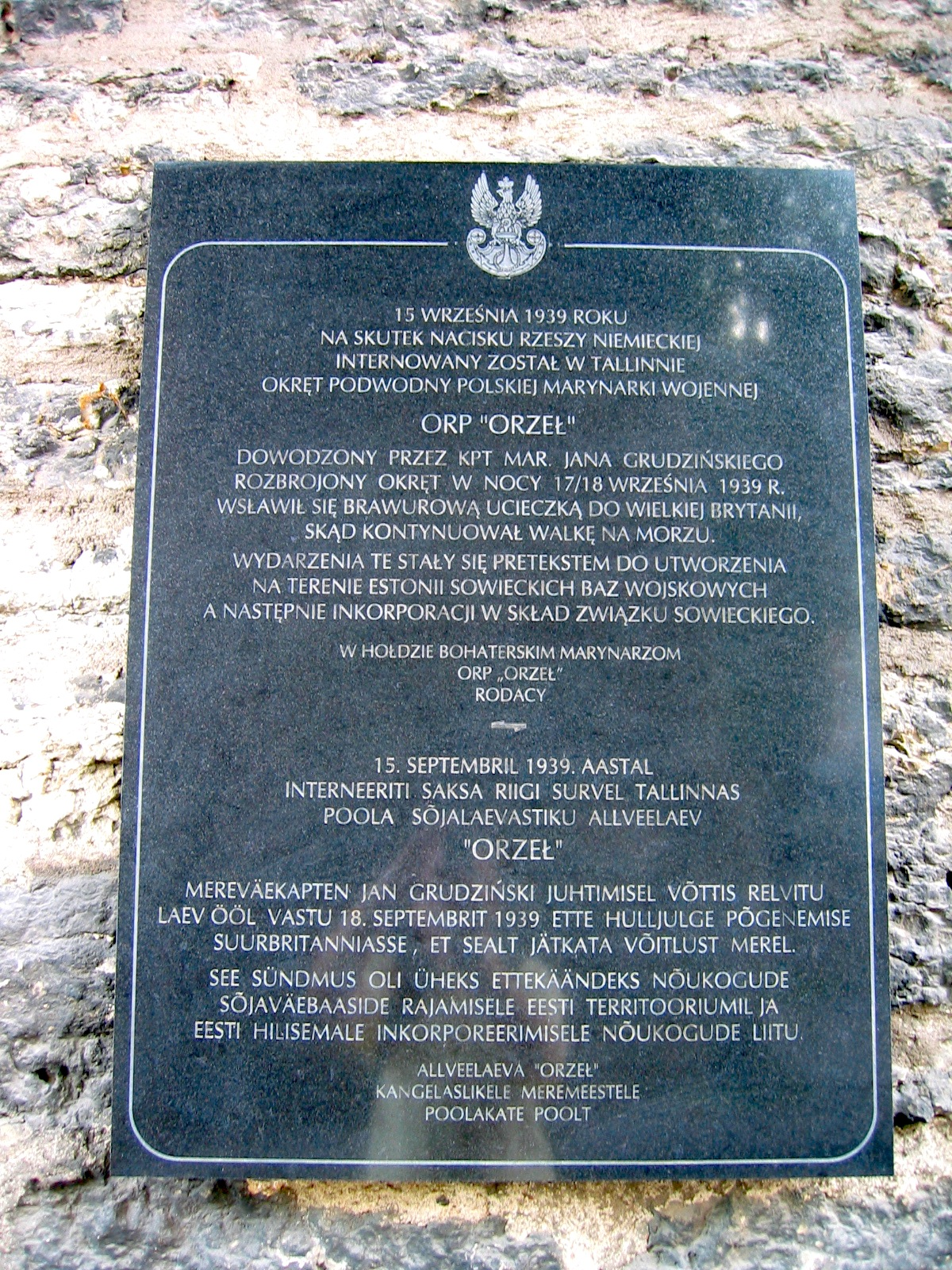
Plaque in both Polish and Estonian commemorating the "Orzeł incident" and the escape of the submarine Orzeł in 1939, Estonian Maritime Museum, Tallinn

Orzel's crew decided to head to Tallinn, Estonia as a result of the damage. Orzeł reached Tallinn on 14 September 1939. On 15 September the captain, Lieutenant-Commander Henryk Kloczkowski, was forced to leave the submarine to undergo hospital treatment for an unknown illness he had been suffering from since 8 September. Under the Hague Convention of 1907, section XIII, Article 12, "belligerent ships" could enter a neutral port but were forbidden from remaining there for "more than twenty-four hours." At the insistence of Germany, the Estonian military authorities boarded the ship, interned the crew, confiscated all the navigation aids and maps, and commenced removing all her armaments. However, only fifteen of her twenty torpedoes were removed before the hoist cable parted; this was because it had been secretly sabotaged by her new commander, former chief officer, Lieutenant Jan Grudzinski.

The crew of Orzeł conspired to carry out a daring escape. Around midnight on 18 September, the submarine's Estonian guards were overpowered, the mooring lines were cut, and Orzeł got under way. The alarm was raised, and her conning tower was peppered by machine-gun fire. Running half-submerged, Orzeł ran aground on a bar at the harbour mouth, where artillery fire damaged her wireless equipment. Grudzinski managed to get the boat off the bar by blowing her tanks, and she proceeded out of the Gulf of Finland, intending to sail for a British port, the crew having heard a radio report that the Polish submarine Wilk had been welcomed in Britain.

Orzel escaped from Tallinn with two Estonian guards on board as hostages. The Estonian and German press covering the Orzeł incident declared the two captured guards missing at sea. Grudzinski set them ashore in Sweden, providing them with clothing, money, and food for their safe return to homeland. The Polish crew believed that "those returning from the underworld deserve to travel first class only". The escape of the submarine Orzeł was used by the Soviet Union and Germany to challenge Estonian neutrality.

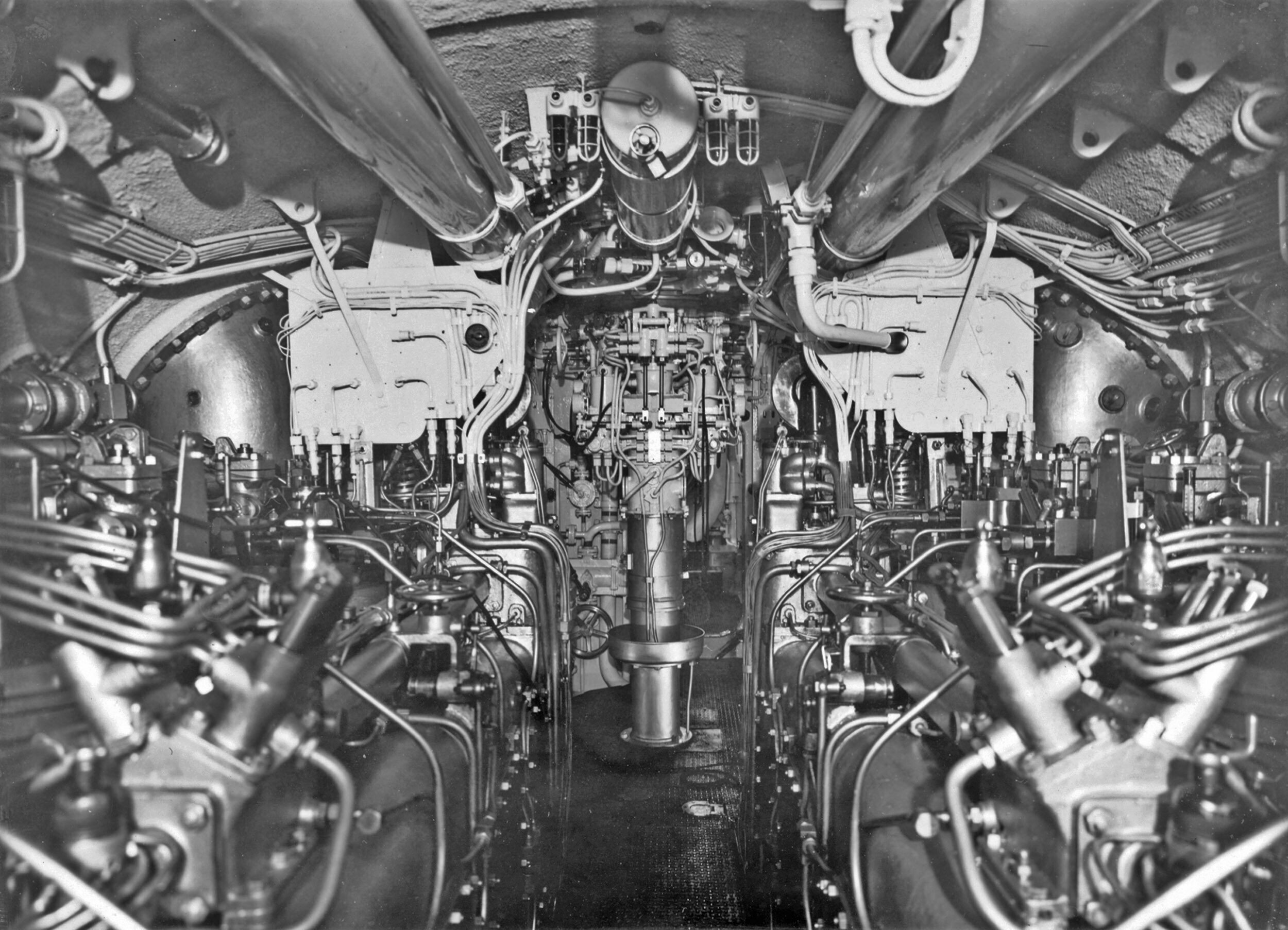
The engine room

Since Orzeł's navigational charts had all been removed by the Estonian authorities, Captain Grudzinski resolved to stop a German ship and take her charts. However, the only German vessels encountered were warships rather than merchantmen. The submarine's sole remaining navigational aid was a list of lighthouses, and using these as a reference, Orzeł followed a course along the Baltic coast, around Denmark, and out into the North Sea, where she came under attack by British as well as German forces, since without her wireless equipment she had no means of identifying herself.

Forty days after she had originally sailed from Gdynia, Orzeł made landfall, off the east coast of Scotland. She lay on the bottom until emergency repairs were made to the radio, then surfaced to transmit a message in English. A Royal Navy destroyer then came out and escorted her into port, to the surprise of the British who had thought her sunk already weeks earlier.

Orzeł sank no enemy vessels during her journey from Estonia to Britain, but Soviet authorities blamed her for sinking the Soviet tanker Metallist in Narva Bay on 26 September, and used the incident as a pretext for the Soviet invasion of Estonia.

=== Norwegian Campaign ===
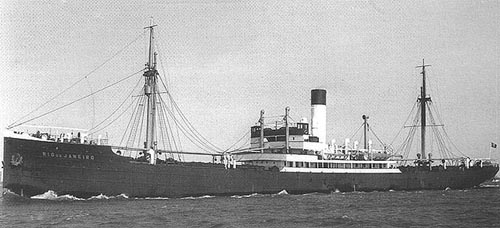
The clandestine German troopship Rio de Janeiro

After a refit, Orzeł was assigned to the Royal Navy's 2nd Submarine Flotilla and was assigned to patrol missions. Shortly after noon on 8 April 1940 she sank the 5,261 GRT clandestine German troopship Rio de Janeiro off the small harbour town of Lillesand in southern Norway, killing hundreds of German troops intended for the invasion of Norway., Rio de Janeiro was heading to Bergen in order to take part in the initial landings of Operation Weserübung – the invasion of Norway and opening move of the Norwegian Campaign. News that several hundred German soldiers were rescued by the Norwegian Navy and some had admitted their intention to occupy Norway reached the Norwegian parliament that evening, but the news was dismissed and no steps were taken to alert their Navy or Coast Guard of the impending invasion. Two days later Orzeł fired a torpedo at a German minesweeper V 705; however, she was forced to dive before the sinking of the German ship could be confirmed. The ship was not damaged by the torpedoes.

== Loss ==
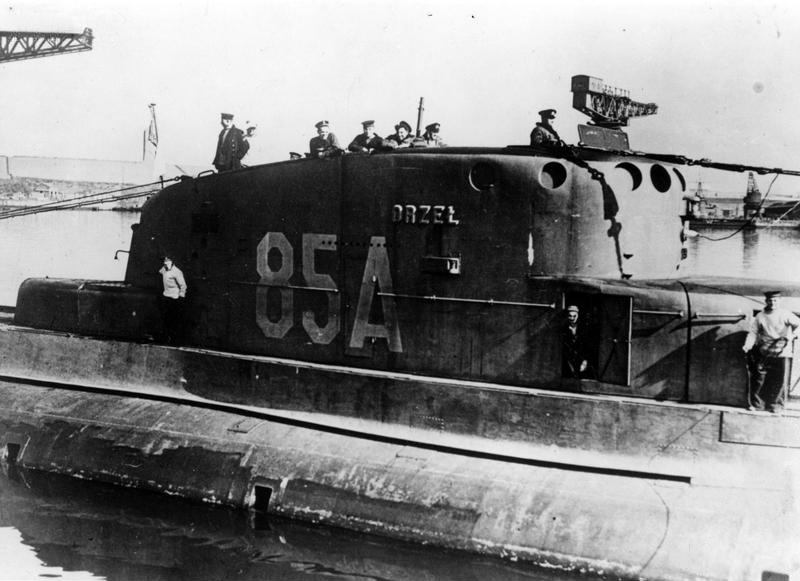
Orzeł in the United Kingdom

On 23 May 1940, Orzeł departed on its seventh patrol in the central North Sea. On 1 and 2 June, radio messages were transmitted from the Rosyth Naval base ordering the boat to alter its patrol area and proceed to the Skagerrak (the strait separating Norway and Sweden from the Danish Jutland peninsula). No radio signals had been received from her since she had sailed, and on 5 June Orzeł was ordered to return to base. No reception was acknowledged. On 8 June 1940 the submarine was officially declared lost. The true cause is unknown, although it is commonly believed Orzeł most likely struck a British or German sea mine in or near the Skagerrak. Another theory suggests the boat may have been sunk mistakenly by a British aircraft.

== Search for the wreck ==
Between 2008 and 2017 a number of Polish expeditions, both private and public-funded, searched the region of North Sea where she went missing with the hope of finding her final resting place. Wrecks of various other ships have been located, but Orzeł has not been among them, and the fate of the ship remains unknown.

In June 2013 the Polish Navy, following reports of a wreck of an unknown large submarine found in the North Sea, conducted one more expedition to check whether the ship could be Orzeł. The wreck was surveyed and identified as HMS J6. In 2017 another private expedition found a previously unknown wreck which they identified to be most likely HMS Narwhal based on sonar data.

On 23 May 2020, 80 years after Orzeł left on its final patrol, the Shipwreck Expeditions Association announced a partnership to search for the wreck in conjunction with the Maritime University of Szczecin with the assistance from the Chancellery of the Prime Minister of the Republic of Poland and the Ministry of Maritime Economy and Inland Navigation. The search is currently entering the logistics and preparations phase for the first expedition.

== See also ==
- The Eagle (1959 film)
