= Jan Grudziński =

Captain of the Polish Navy, submariner (1907–1940)

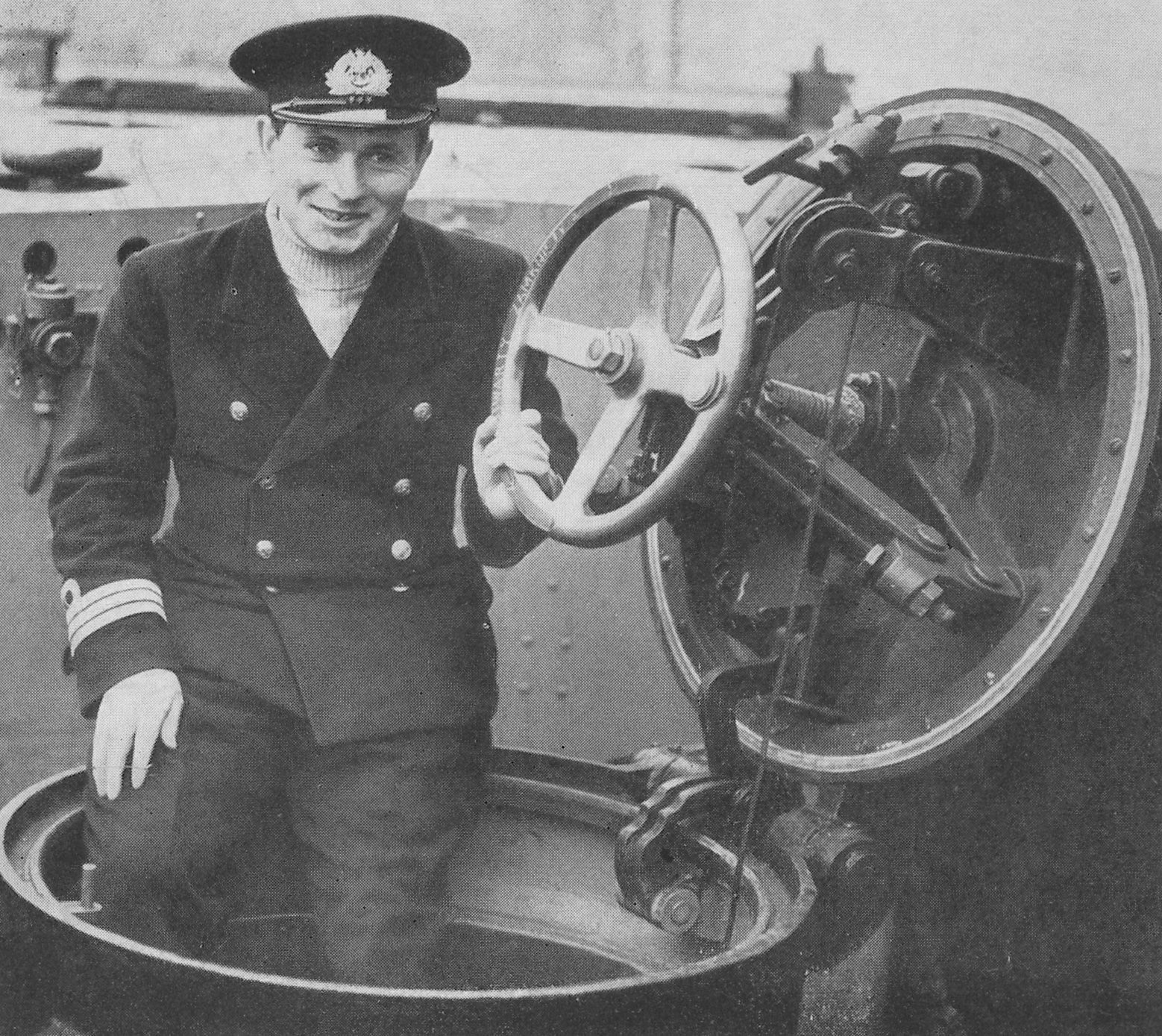
- Born: 3 December 1907; Kiev, Russian Empire
- Died: 1940 May/June; Onboard ORP Orzeł, North Sea
- Military career
- Allegiance: Poland
- Branch: Polish Navy
- Service years: 1921–1940
- Rank: Lieutenant commander
- Commands: ORP Kujawiak; ORP Orzeł
- Conflicts: World War II
- Awards: Virtuti Militari (Silver Cross); Virtuti Militari (Golden Cross); Cross of Valour; Navy Medal; Distinguished Service Order

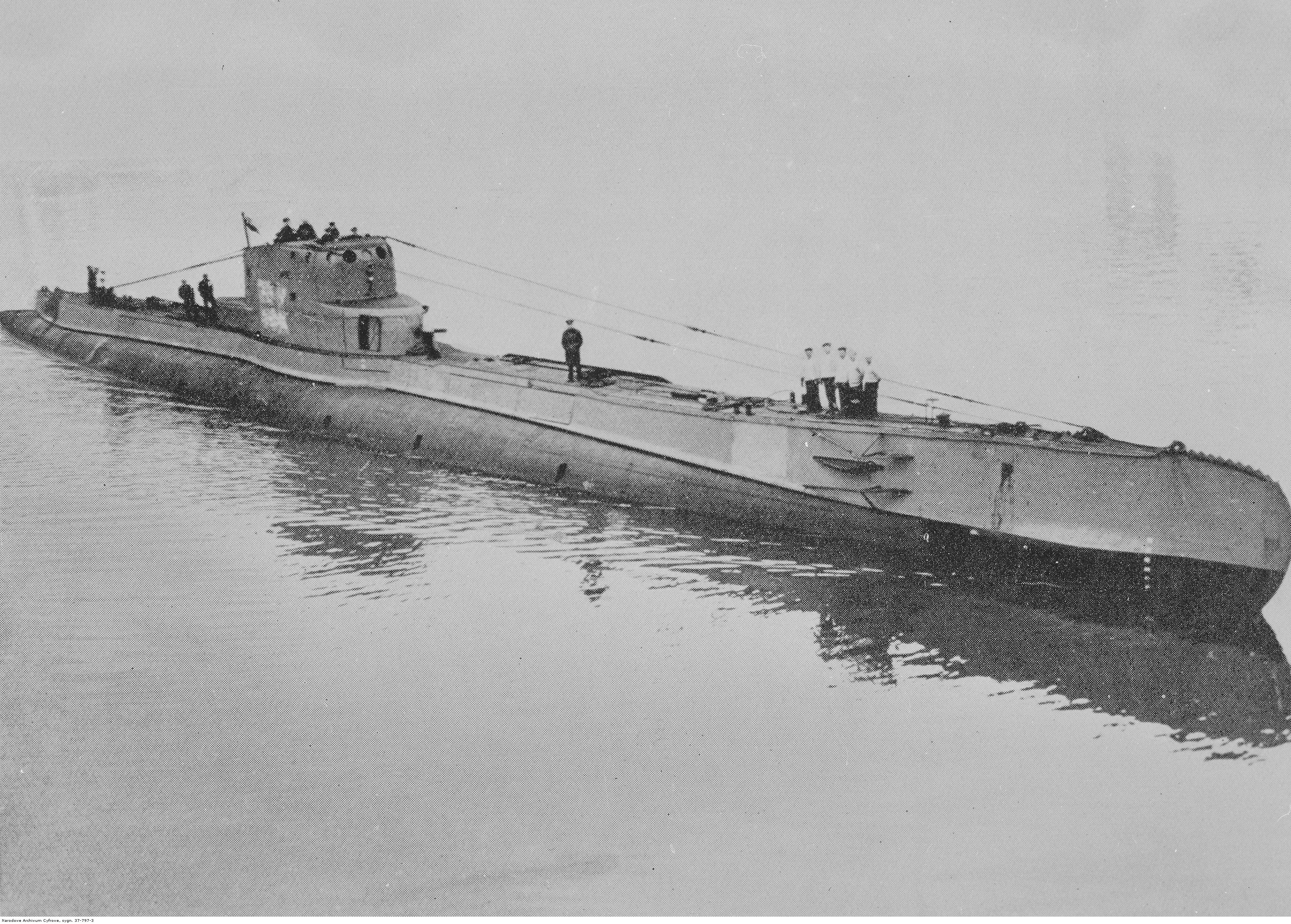
Submarine ORP Orzeł

Jan Grudziński (3 December 1907– May/June 1940) was a submarine commander of the Polish Navy during World War II.

== Biography ==
Jan Grudziński was born in Kiev son of Stanisław and Regina Radecka. After Poland regained independence, in late 1918 he settled with his parents in Lwów where in 1921 he entered the First Cadet Corps. After his graduating he entered the Polish Naval Academy and became ensign (podporucznik) in 1928. In 1932 he served as executive officer on the torpedo boat ORP Kujawiak. He completed the underwater weapons training (1933–1934) then in 1937, the submarine navigation course. In 1938 he was executive officer on the submarine ORP Sęp. Shortly before the start of World War II, he was transferred to the submarine ORP Orzeł.

During the Invasion of Poland, when ORP Orzeł was patrolling the Baltic Sea, Grudziński took command of the ship due to illness of the commanding officer Henryk Kłoczkowski. On 14 September 1939 Orzeł arrived to Tallinn where Kłoczkowski was taken to hospital. The next day, at the insistence of the Germans, Estonian military authorities boarded the ship, interned the crew, confiscated all the navigation aids and maps, and commenced dismantling all the armaments. On 17 September Orzeł escaped and Grudziński decided to continue to patrol the Baltic Sea. After exhausting the possibilities of combat, Grudziński took the decision to join United Kingdom where he arrived on 14 October.

On 21 October Grudziński was officially named commander of ORP Orzeł. After the necessary repairs in late 1939, the submarine undertook cruises in the North Sea. During these patrols, she succeeded in sinking the German troopship Rio de Janeiro and probably a patrol boat.

Orzeł departed on her seventh patrol on 23 May, to the central North Sea. No radio signals were received from her after departure. Orzeł disappeared without a trace. It is likely that she hit a mine. 8 June 1940 was officially accepted as the day of her loss. Jan Grudziński perished with his crew.

== Awards and decorations ==
Virtuti Militari, Silver Cross
Virtuti Militari, Golden Cross
Cross of Valour
Navy Medal (Medal Morski)
Distinguished Service Order

== Military promotions ==
ensign (podporucznik)	1928
lieutenant junior grade (porucznik)	1932
lieutenant (kapitan marynarki)	1936
lieutenant commander (komandor podporucznik)	1940 (posthumously)

== Cultural references ==
In the 2022 film Below The Surface he was portrayed by Tomasz Ziętek.
