= German–Soviet Axis talks =

1940 negotiations for Soviet entry as a fourth Axis power in WWII

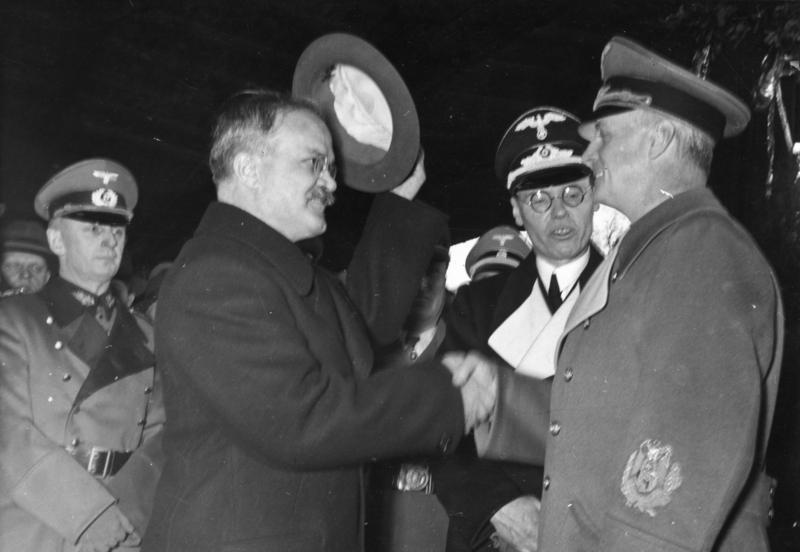
Joachim von Ribbentrop welcoming Vyacheslav Molotov in Berlin, November 1940

Talks between Nazi Germany and the Soviet Union occurred in October and November 1940, nominally concerning the latter's potential adherent as a fourth Axis power during World War II, among other potential agreements. The negotiations, which occurred during the era of the Molotov–Ribbentrop Pact, included a two-day conference in Berlin between Soviet Foreign Minister Vyacheslav Molotov, Adolf Hitler and German Foreign Minister Joachim von Ribbentrop. While Ribbentrop and most of the German Foreign office wanted an alliance with the Soviet Union, Hitler (supported by most of the other leadership) had been planning to invade the Soviet Union. In early June 1940 as the Battle of France was still ongoing, Hitler reportedly told Lt. General Georg von Sodenstern that the victories against the Allies had “finally freed his hands for his important real task: the showdown with Bolshevism." Ribbentrop nevertheless convinced Hitler to allow diplomatic overtures, with his own hope being for an alliance. Ribbentrop and Benito Mussolini had already speculated at the idea of offering the Soviet Union a free hand in a southern direction. Ribbentrop's approach in general to foreign policy was different from Hitler's: he favored an alliance with the Soviet Union, while Hitler had wanted to pressure Britain into an alliance and pushing for "lebensraum" (living space) in the east.

After negotiations from 12 to 14 November 1940, Ribbentrop presented Molotov with a written draft for an Axis pact agreement that defined the world spheres of influence of the four proposed Axis powers (Germany, Italy, Japan and the Soviet Union). Ribbentrop and Molotov tried to set German and Soviet spheres of influence. Hitler encouraged Molotov to look south to Iran and eventually India, to preserve German access to Finland's resources and to remove Soviet influence in the Balkans. Hitler however seemingly had no intention of allowing the Soviet Union into the Axis: in an internal memoranda Hitler stated: "Political conversations designed to clarify the attitude of Russia in the immediate future have been started. Regardless of the outcome of these conversations, all preparations for the East previously ordered orally are to be continued. [Written] directives on that will follow as soon as the basic elements of the army's plan for the operation have been submitted to me and approved by me." There was, in other words, no expectation by Hitler of a long-term agreement with Russia—war was intended. The Soviets approached the negotiations differently, anticipating a general agreement and willing to make huge economic concessions to secure it, and general terms which had been acceptable to the Germans just a year before. Hitler's stated objective was to test Soviet attitude concerning the period before he could launch Operation Barbarossa.

Molotov remained firm and sought to remove German troops from Finland and gain a warm water port in the Baltic. Soviet foreign policy calculations were predicated on the idea that the war would be a long-term struggle and so German claims that the United Kingdom would be defeated swiftly were treated with skepticism. In addition, Stalin sought to remain influential in Bulgaria and Yugoslavia. Those factors resulted in Molotov taking a firm line.

According to a study by Alexander Nekrich, on 25 November 1940, the Soviets presented a Stalin-drafted written counterproposal accepting the four power pact but including Soviet rights to Bulgaria and a world sphere of influence, to be centred on the area around Iraq and Iran. Germany did not respond, and left the negotiations unresolved.

Regarding the counterproposal, Hitler remarked to his top military chiefs that Stalin "demands more and more", "he's a cold-blooded blackmailer" and "a German victory has become unbearable for Russia" so that "she must be brought to her knees as soon as possible." Hitler had already decided to invade the Soviet Union in July 1940, but this apparently accelerated the process. As early as 1935 Germany had proposed a joint alliance and invasion of the Soviet Union to Poland, but this was rejected by the Poles. Germany ended the Molotov–Ribbentrop Pact in June 1941 by invading the Soviet Union.

In the following years, the Soviet Information Bureau published a book titled Falsifiers of History, largely edited by Stalin himself, in which the Soviet premier claimed that he was simply testing his enemy. This became the official version of events that persisted in Soviet historiography up until the dissolution of the Soviet Union in 1991. According to Soviet diplomat Victor Israelyan, the book "certainly did nothing to disprove the existence of Soviet-German cooperation in the first years of World War II, a cooperation that to a certain degree assisted Hitler's plan".

== Background ==
=== Relations in 1939 and 1940 ===
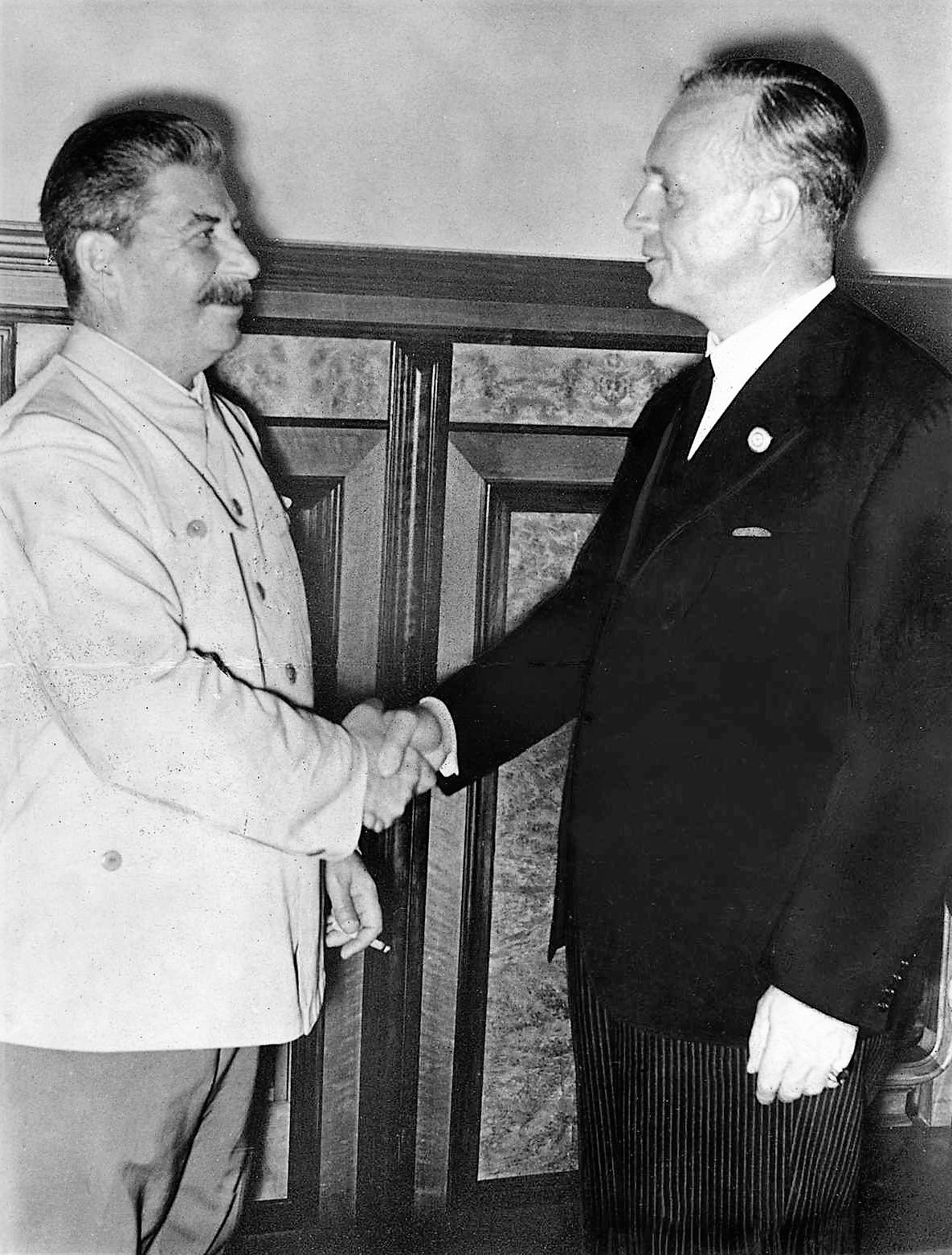
Ribbentrop and Stalin at the signing of the German–Soviet Pact

During the summer of 1939, after it had conducted negotiations with a British-French alliance and with Germany regarding potential military and political agreements, the Soviet Union chose Germany, which resulted in an August 19 German–Soviet Credit Agreement providing for the trade of certain German military and civilian equipment in exchange for Soviet raw materials. Four days later, the countries signed the Molotov–Ribbentrop Pact, which contained secret protocols dividing the states of Northern and Eastern Europe into German and Soviet spheres of influence.

Just before the signing of the agreements, the parties had addressed past hostilities, with German Foreign Minister Joachim Ribbentrop telling Soviet diplomats that "there was no problem between the Baltic and the Black Sea that could not be solved between the two of us". Diplomats from both countries addressed their common ground by stating "there is one common element in the ideology of Germany, Italy, and the Soviet Union: opposition to the capitalist democracies", "neither we nor Italy have anything in common with the capitalist west" and "it seems to us rather unnatural that a socialist state would stand on the side of the western democracies".

A German official claimed that their prior hostility toward Soviet Bolshevism had subsided with the changes in the Comintern and the Soviets' renunciation of a world revolution. A Soviet official characterised the conversation as "extremely important". At the signing, Ribbentrop and Stalin enjoyed warm conversations, exchanged toasts and further discussed their prior hostilities between the countries in the 1930s.

As Ribbentrop left, Stalin took him aside and stated that the Soviet government took the new pact very seriously, and he would "guarantee his word of honor that the Soviet Union would not betray its partner".

One week after the Molotov–Ribbentrop Pact had been signed, the partition of Poland started by the German invasion of western Poland.

The Soviet Comintern suspended all anti-Nazi and antifascist propaganda by explaining the war in Europe to be a matter of capitalist states attacking each other for imperialist purposes.

When anti-German demonstrations erupted in Prague, Czechoslovakia, the Comintern ordered the Czech Communist Party to employ all of its strength to paralyze "chauvinist elements". Moscow soon forced the French Communist Party and the Communist Party of Great Britain to adopt an antiwar position.

Two weeks after the German invasion, the Soviet Union invaded eastern Poland in co-ordination with German forces. On September 21, the Soviets and the Germans signed a formal agreement coordinating military movements in Poland, including the "purging" of saboteurs. A joint German–Soviet parade was held in L'vov and Brest.

Stalin had decided in August that he was going to liquidate the Polish state, and a German–Soviet meeting in September addressed the future structure of the "Polish region". The Soviets stated in September that they must enter Poland to "protect" their ethnic Ukrainian and Belarusian brethren therein from Germany, but Molotov later admitted to German officials that the excuse had been necessary because the Soviets could find no other pretext for their invasion.

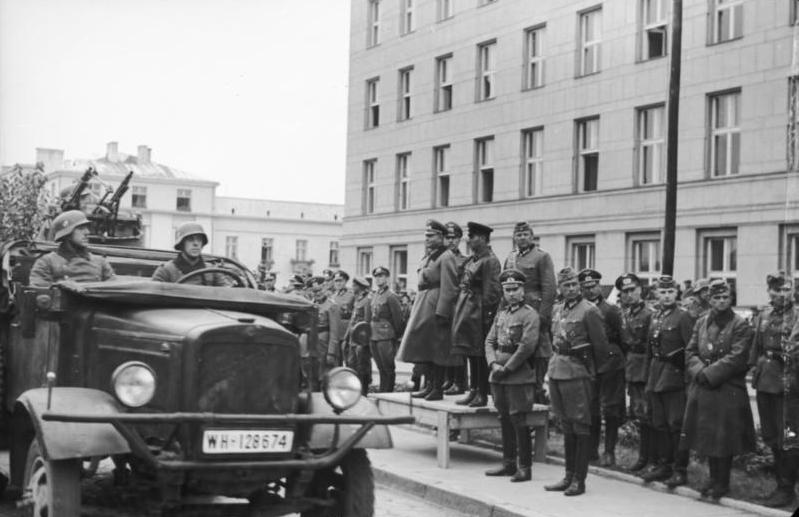
Soviet and German generals during the official transfer of Brest to Soviet control, September 23, 1939

Three of the Baltic States described by the Molotov–Ribbentrop Pact (Estonia, Latvia and Lithuania) were given no choice but to sign a "Pact of Defence and Mutual Assistance", which permitted the Soviet Union to station troops in them.

=== Expansion of raw materials and military trading ===
Hitler's pressing for a German invasion of Poland in 1939 placed tremendous strain on the German war machine, which had been gradually gearing up for total war only in 1942 or 1943. Germany's lack of raw materials meant that it had to seek increased supply from outside. However, a British blockade occurred, which left it increasingly desperate for materials. The only country that could still supply Germany with the oil, rubber, manganese, grains, fats and platinum that it needed was the Soviet Union. Meanwhile, the Soviets' demands for manufactured goods, such as German machines, were increasing, and their ability to import those goods from outside decreased when many countries ceased trading relations after the Soviets had joined the Molotov–Ribbentrop Pact.

Accordingly, Germany and the Soviet Union entered an intricate trade pact on February 11, 1940, which was over four times larger than the one that both countries had signed in August 1939. The new trade pact helped Germany to circumvent the British blockade.

In the first year, Germany received hundreds of thousands of tons of cereals, oil and other vital raw materials, which were transported through Soviet and occupied Polish territories. In addition, the Soviets provided Germany with access to the Northern Sea Route for both cargo ships and raiders (though only the raider Komet had used the route before June 1941). This forced Britain to protect sea lanes in both the Atlantic and the Pacific Oceans.

== Deterioration of relations in mid-1940 ==
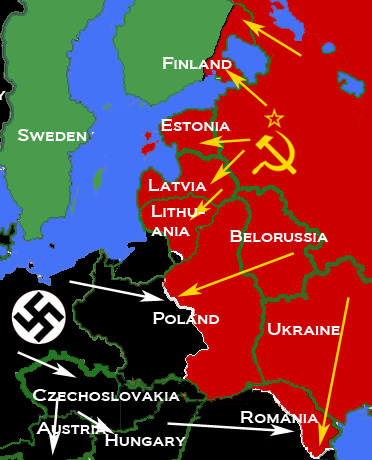
Map depicting most of Central and Eastern Europe and showing 1938 borders along with German (black) and Soviet (red) military and political advances until late 1940

=== Finland, Baltics and Romania ===
In November 1939, the Soviet Union invaded Finland, resulting in stiff losses and the entry of an interim peace treaty in March 1940 that granted to the Soviet Union parts of Karelia and Salla (9% of Finnish territory). In mid-June 1940, while international attention was focused on the German invasion of France, Soviet NKVD troops raided border posts in Lithuania, Estonia and Latvia, and replaced each government with pro-Soviet politicians, who then requested entry for their respective countries to the Soviet Union. In June, the Soviets issued an ultimatum demanding Bessarabia and Bukovina from Romania. After the Soviets had agreed with Germany that they would limit their claims in Bukovina to Northern Bukovina, Germany urged Romania to accept the ultimatum. Two days after the Soviet entry, Romania acceded to the Soviet demands, and the Soviet Union occupied the demanded territories and also the Hertsa region, which had not been included in the ultimatum.

The Soviet invasion of Finland, which had been covertly ceded to it under the Molotov–Ribbentrop Pact's secret protocols, created domestic problems for Hitler. The German populace did not know about the secret protocols that divided up spheres of influence. Many Germans opposed the Soviet invasion, and Finland had close ties with Germany. Hitler had to deflect opposition to Germany's pro-Soviet policies from even Nazi Party stalwarts. Supporting the Soviet invasion became one of the most ideologically and politically difficult aspects of the pact for the German government to justify.

The secret protocols caused Hitler to be in the humiliating position of being forced to evacuate ethnic German families, the Volksdeutsche, in a hurry although they had lived in Finland and the Baltic countries for centuries, all the while to condone the invasions officially. When the three Baltic countries, which did not know about the secret protocols, sent letters protesting the Soviet invasions to Berlin, Ribbentrop returned them.

In August, Molotov told the Germans that with the government change, they could close down their Baltic consulates by September 1. The Soviet annexations in Romania caused further strain. Germany had given Bessarabia to the Soviets in the secret protocols but not Bukovina. Germany wanted the 100,000 tons of grain for which they had previously contracted with Bessarabia, guarantees of German property safety, guarantees for 125,000 Volksdeutsche in Bessarabia and Bukovina and the reassurance that the train tracks carrying Romanian oil would be left alone.

=== Increasing German raw material dependence ===
In the summer of 1940, Germany grew even more dependent on Soviet imports. German occupations of France, the Netherlands and Belgium created additional demand and decreased avenues for indirect supply. Compared to 1938 figures, the expanded Greater Germany and its sphere of influence lacked, among other items, 500,000 tons of manganese, 3.3 million tons of raw phosphate, 200,000 tons of rubber and 9.5 million tons of oil. Meanwhile, the Baltic invasions resulted in the Soviet occupation of states on which Germany had relied for 96.7 million Reichsmarks of imports in 1938 at blackmailed favorable economic terms but from which they now had to pay Soviet prices. No concrete plans had yet been made, but Hitler told one of his generals in June that the victories in Western Europe "finally freed his hands for his important real task: the showdown with Bolshevism". In addition, Hitler increasingly believed the eventual invasion of the Soviet Union to appear the only way for Germany to solve that resource crisis. However, German generals told Hitler that occupying Western Russia would create "more of a drain than a relief for Germany's economic situation".

=== Suspension of Soviet raw materials to Germany ===
In August 1940, the Soviet Union briefly suspended its deliveries under their commercial agreement after relations were strained following a disagreement over policy in Romania, the Winter War, Germany's falling behind in its deliveries of goods under the pact, and Stalin's concern that Hitler's war with the West might end quickly after France had signed an armistice. The suspension created significant resource problems for Germany.

By late August, relations improved again as the countries had redrawn the Hungarian and Romanian borders and settled some Bulgarian claims, and Stalin was again convinced that Germany would face a long war in the west with Britain's improvement in its air battle against Germany and the execution of an agreement between the United States and Britain regarding destroyers and bases.

However, in late August, Germany arranged its own annexation of part of Romania, which targeted oil fields. The move raised tensions with the Soviets, who responded that Germany was supposed to have consulted with the Soviet Union under Article III of the Molotov–Ribbentrop Pact.

== Tripartite Pact ==
Before entering a deal with Italy and Japan, German officials had discussed the feasibility of including the Soviet Union as a fourth member to direct Soviet focus southward, to the Indian Ocean and Persian Gulf, both of which were in the British sphere of influence. German officials indicated that they would be willing to give the Soviet Union freedom to operate east of the Dardanelles.

Just before the signing of the agreement, Germany informed Molotov that it would enter the pact and that while it was not explicitly stated, the pact was effectively directed against "American warmongers" by demonstrating to them the folly of war with three great powers aligned against them. Moscow had actually been aware of the proposed pact terms from Soviet intelligence sources in Japan.

On September 27, 1940, Germany, Italy and Japan signed the Tripartite Pact, which divided the world into spheres of influence and was implicitly directed at the United States. The pact contained an explicit provision (Article 5) that stated it did not concern relations with the Soviet Union. Molotov, worried that the pact contained a secret codicil pertaining specifically to the Soviet Union, attempted to extract information from the Japanese ambassador in Moscow, Togo.

On a home visit, the German military attaché to the Soviet Union, Ernst Köstring, stated on October 31 that "the impression is steadily growing in me that the Russians want to avoid any conflict with us".

Meanwhile, from August to October, Germany conducted a massive air campaign against Britain to prepare for Operation Sea Lion, the plan to invade Britain.

== War or a higher-level pact ==
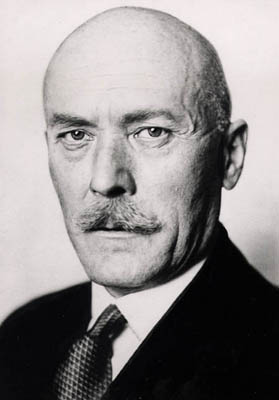
Ambassador Friedrich Werner von der Schulenburg

German ambassador to Moscow, Friedrich von der Schulenburg, had been contemplating a potential four-power pact since the collapse of France in June. After he had covertly learned about Hitler's potential Soviet invasion plans, which he and Ribbentrop opposed, von der Schulenburg and others began attempting to sway Hitler and his contingent at least extend to their agreement as long as Russia's claims remained in the areas of Turkey and Iran. He even concealed in his reports to Berlin the Soviets' doubts on Germany's good faith after the annexations in Romania.

Köstring, von der Schulenburg and others drafted a memorandum on the dangers of a German invasion of the Soviet Union that included that Ukraine, Belarus and the Baltic States would end up being only a further economic burden for Germany. German Foreign Office State Secretary Ernst von Weizsäcker argued that the Soviets in their current bureaucratic form were harmless, the occupation would not produce a gain for Germany and "why should it not stew next to us in its damp Bolshevism?"

== Stalin–Ribbentrop exchange in October ==
In October 1940, Stalin requested that Molotov be permitted to discuss with Hitler the countries' future relations. Ribbentrop responded to Stalin in a letter that "in the opinion of the Führer... it appears to be the historical mission of the Four Powers — the Soviet Union, Italy, Japan and Germany — to adopt a long-range policy and to direct the future development of their peoples into the right channels by delimitation of their interests in a worldwide scale".

The delivery of Ribbentrop's letter was delayed to Stalin. That resulted, after earlier press stories, in the ideas no longer seeming "fresh", which caused Ribbentrop to lash out at the personnel of German embassy in Moscow. Delivering the letter, von Schulenburg stated that the Berlin conference would be a preliminary meeting preceding a convening of the four powers.

Stalin was visibly pleased by the invitation for talks in Berlin. Stalin wrote a letter responding to Ribbentrop on entering an agreement regarding a "permanent basis" for their "mutual interests".

On November 6, Köstring wrote that "since Göring has now put our military deliveries in balance with the Russian deliveries, one may hope that the negotiations will end in peace and friendship". During the first two weeks in November, German and Soviet economic negotiators in Moscow enjoyed moderate success. German military-economic negotiators had hoped for success in the negotiations, in part because they felt that it would strengthen their arguments against Hitler's policy, which was increasingly anti-Soviet.

On November 1, the head of the Army General Staff, Franz Halder, noted that Molotov would have accepted the invitation to Berlin, he believed this to be an attempt by Hitler to bring "Russia into an anti-British front". After Franklin D. Roosevelt won the presidential election four days later after he had promised that there would be no foreign wars if he was elected, Joseph Goebbels noted that "after his statement, Roosevelt will hardly be able to enter the war in an active capacity". Meeting with Benito Mussolini, Ribbentrop explained the German view of the meetings that the acid test would be the Soviets' stand on the Balkans. With the Balkans and the Bosporus a potential "dangerous overlapping of interests" if the Soviets backed away from it, it would be a peaceful and even a preferable alternative to an invasion.

Hitler revealed to Mussolini that he did not expect to accommodate the Soviets beyond forcing Turkey to yield to some guarantees on the Bosporus. Also, he did not want Stalin taking a Romanian entry point to the Bosporus and stated that "one Romanian bird in the hand is worth more than two Russians in the bush". However, Hitler stated that he was skeptical because he believed that Stalin was obsessed with the Danube and Bulgaria. Germany was aware that the Soviet Union had attempted to extend guarantees to Bulgaria to become its ally and that Bulgaria had turned it down.

== Molotov travels to Berlin ==
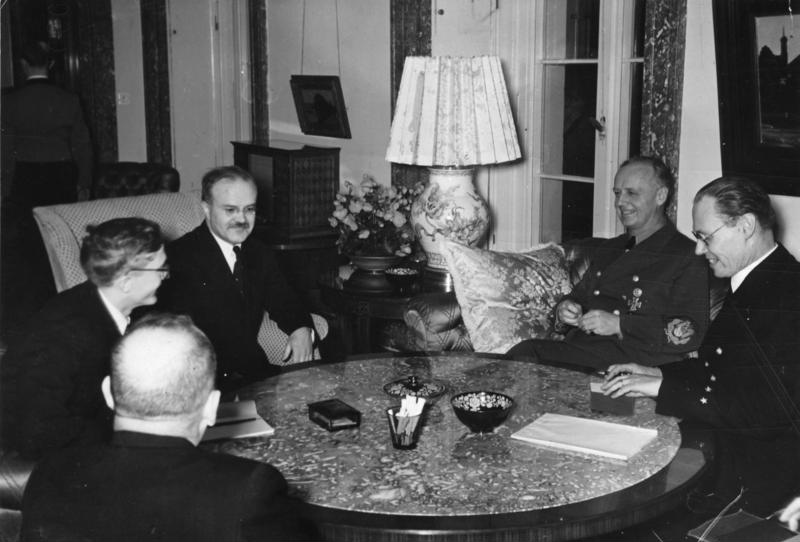
Molotov just after arrival at the Reichskanzlei at noon

Front of Pravda, with photographs of Molotov in Berlin

=== November 12 ===
Stalin sent Molotov to Berlin to negotiate the terms for the Soviet Union to join the Axis and potentially enjoy the spoils of the pact. Molotov spent much of the trip to Berlin searching his rail car for listening devices. Molotov's train arrived at 11:05 a.m. on November 12. It was a bad omen for success that von Schulenburg, the architect of the meeting, was excluded. Molotov was greeted by Ribbentrop at the train station decorated with Soviet and German flags above a large basket of flowers, with an orchestra playing The Internationale in Germany for the first time since 1933. After a brief breakfast, the talks started immediately that day at the Schloss Bellevue Hotel. After the dissolution of the Soviet Union, a Moscow journal published certain selected correspondence revealing that Stalin was closely supervising Molotov's talks via telegram, but some of those telegrams remain unpublished.

At the outset, Ribbentrop stated, "England is beaten and it is only a question of time when she will admit her defeat.... The beginning of the end has now arrived for the British empire." He further stated that "the entry of the United States into the war is of no consequence at all for Germany. Germany and Italy will never again allow an Anglo-Saxon to land on the European Continent.... This is no military problem at all.... The Axis Powers are, therefore, not considering how they can win the war, but rather how rapidly they can end the war which is already won". He further stated that Germany and the Soviet Union had together "done some good business".

Accordingly, Ribbentrop concluded that the time had come for the four powers (Germany, the Soviet Union, Italy and Japan) to define their "spheres of interest". He stated that Hitler had concluded that all four countries would naturally expand "in a southerly direction". Ribbentrop said that he wondered if the Soviets might turn southward toward the sea, and Molotov inquired, "Which sea?" Ribbentrop stated that "in the long run the most advantageous access to the sea for Russia could be found in the direction of the Persian Gulf and the Arabian Sea".

Regarding the division of the world into four spheres of influence, Molotov stated the new idea was "very interesting" and worthy of a discussion in Moscow with Ribbentrop participating. Stalin became annoyed with a telegram to him from Molotov stating that the Molotov–Ribbentrop Pact was "exhausted" with the exception of the Finnish issue, with Stalin stating that any future agreements would be added to it merely because it served as a fundamental basis for German–Soviet relations.

In the afternoon, Molotov visited Hitler at the Reich Chancellery. Hitler also spoke of striking that "final blow against England" and stated that "it is time to think about division of the world after our victory". Regarding the "problem of America", according to Shirer, he stated that it could not "endanger the freedom of other nations before 1970 or 1980". Hitler and Molotov agreed that the United States had no business in Europe, Africa or Asia. Hitler stated that there were no fundamental differences between the two countries in their pursuit of aspiring for "access to the ocean". Molotov expressed his agreement with Hitler about the role of America and Britain and about Soviet participation in the Axis pact in principle but only if the Soviets could participate as an active partner. The same day, Germany also postponed until the following year its plans to invade Britain because of its failures in the air campaign against Britain.

Molotov agreed with Hitler that there were no unresolved problems between the countries except on Finland. When Molotov returned to his hotel, he stated that he was "relieved at Hitler's amiability". In a telegram to Molotov that night, Stalin insisted that the security of the Soviet Union cannot be ensured "without securing tranquility in the area of the Straits" in reference the Bosporus Straits for entry into the Black Sea. That was linked directly with the Soviet–Bulgarian agreement for passage of Soviet troops for "the defense of entry into the Black Sea". Stalin added that "this question still bears current importance and does not allow any procrastination".

=== November 13 ===
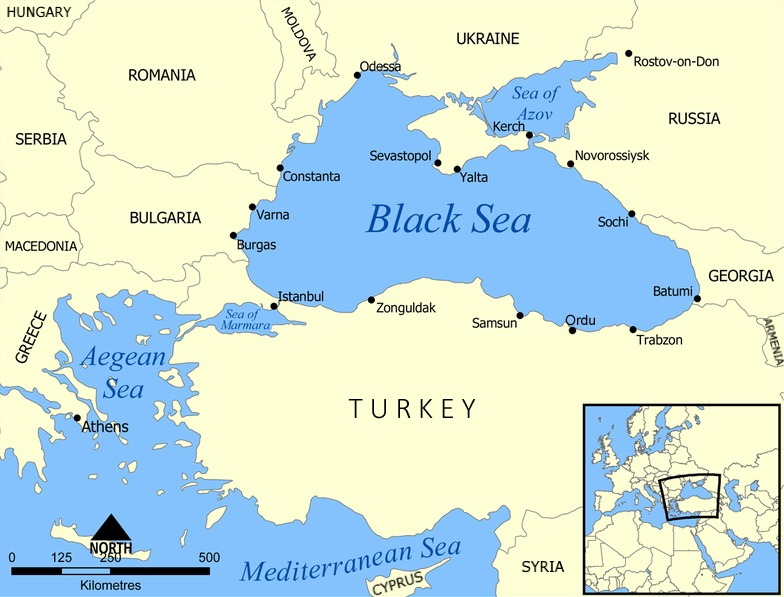
The Bosporus intersects Istanbul in the southwest corner of the Black Sea. Bulgaria is to its north.

Molotov and Hitler resumed their discussions the next morning. Molotov demanded to know why German troops occupied Finland, and Hitler replied that they were travelling through Finland to Norway and wondered whether the Soviets intended to go to war over Finland. While Hitler agreed that Finland was within the Soviets' sphere of influence, he also stressed that Germany had a legitimate wartime interest in Finland's nickel and wood supply and that any new conflict in the Baltics would lead to a severe strain in relations. Molotov concluded that nothing good could come from further talks about Finland and stated that he saw no signs of any resumption of a Soviet–Finnish conflict. According to Hitler, however, Molotov stated, "Russia felt herself again endangered by Finland, Russia should be able to liquidate Finland", which for him "was the first question which I found difficult to answer. But I could not do otherwise than refuse this".

Molotov conveyed Stalin's interest in reviewing the status of the Bosporus and pressed for a guarantee for Bulgaria, at least in principle. Molotov later noted that Hitler became "markedly agitated" at the request to revoke guarantees to Romania. Molotov stated Stalin's wish to grant a guarantee to Bulgaria similar to the one that Germany and Italy had granted to Romania. Hitler pointed out that the Soviets had entered Bukovina in Romania, which went beyond the Molotov–Ribbentrop Pact. Hitler stated the parties had made a prior oral agreement that the former Austrian territories, such as the Balkan states within the Austro-Hungarian Empire, were to fall within the German sphere of influence. Hitler pointed out that a primary goal of the Molotov–Ribbentrop Pact was to restore the countries' old empires. Stalin, still hoping to get a draft agreement, was monitoring the conversations by telegram and sent a telegram to Molotov to remind Hitler of the importance of securing the Bosporus that explained the events of the Crimean War. Hitler stated that he could not make decisions regarding Bulgaria until he had conversed with Italian leader Benito Mussolini.

Hitler changed the subject to the larger matter of the opportunities available after the conquest of England. Hitler told Molotov that:

After the conquest of England, the British Empire would be apportioned as a gigantic world-wide estate in bankruptcy of forty million square kilometres. In this bankrupt estate there would be for Russia access to the ice-free and really open ocean. Thus far, a minority of forty-five million Englishmen had ruled six hundred million inhabitants of the British Empire. He was about to crush this minority.... Under these circumstances there arose world-wide perspectives.... All the countries which could possibly be interested in the bankrupt estate would have to stop all controversies among themselves and concern themselves exclusively with the partition of the British Empire. This applied to Germany, France, Italy, Russia and Japan.

Molotov told Hitler that "the time has now come to discuss a broader agreement between the USSR and Germany", but the Soviet government first wanted to know the precise meaning of "the New Order in Europe" regarding the participating countries and the ultimate aims of the pact. Molotov then was scheduled to meet with Ribbentrop that afternoon.

A telegram that Molotov sent to Stalin on the meeting with Hitler underscored, "Hitler's great interest in reaching an agreement and strengthening friendly relations with the USSR with respect to spheres of influence." Molotov stated that his talk with neither Hitler nor Ribbentrop produced the desired results, as the issues with Turkey and the Balkans had not been addressed.

Because of British aerial bombardment, Ribbentrop and Molotov conducted talks that night in an air-raid shelter. Ribbentrop reiterated that the chief goals were to define the four powers' interests and to reach an agreement with Turkey on the Bosporus issue. Ribbentrop proposed several parallel steps the parties should then take such as Molotov discussing the issues raised in Berlin with Stalin while Ribbentrop discussed them with Japan. Germany, Italy and the USSR would also pressure Turkey to acquiesce to Soviet demands on the Bosporus. Thereafter, the parties would negotiate and draft confidential documents bearing in mind that the final accord would be a Soviet entry into the Axis. What Molotov did not know was that the very night, Hitler issued secret "Instruction No. 18", directing his forces to continue to prepare for war in the east "irrespective of the results yielded by these discussions".

=== German proposed draft agreement ===
Ribbentrop gave Molotov a draft agreement in the air-raid shelter with two parts. As had become the practice between the parties, one part was of the agreement that would eventually be made public, and the other contained the secret agreement. The public portion contained an agreement with a ten-year duration whereby the parties would respect each other's natural spheres of interest, and Germany, Italy and Japan would affirm their recognition of existing Soviet borders.

The draft of the secret agreement included the obligation not to join any alliance directed at the four signatories and to assist each other in economic matters. The secret agreement contained a protocol defining the territorial objectives of the four signatories, with Germany laying claims to Central Africa, Italy in North and Northeast Africa, Japan in Southeast Asia and the Soviet zone to the ”center south of the national territory of the Soviet Union in the direction of the Indian Ocean.” A second secret protocol provided that Germany, Italy and the Soviet Union would "liberate" Turkey from its international obligations with Britain to guarantee its borders.

Molotov stated that the Soviet Union was concerned with several European issues, such as Turkey and Bulgaria, but also the fates of Hungary, Romania, Yugoslavia and Greece. In addition, the Soviets were also interested in the question of Swedish neutrality and the passage from the Baltic Sea. Molotov also cuttingly asked why, if England's fate was sealed, they were talking in an air raid shelter.

=== Reaction to Molotov trip ===
The news that Molotov held talks in Berlin initially stunned world media, with the British press endeavouring to determine whether the Soviets were preparing to join the Axis pact. When Molotov returned, he noted that the meeting produced "nothing to boast about" and that Ribbentrop's projected trip to Moscow was no longer mentioned but that the German draft proposal led to a complacent rather than crisis approach of continuing negotiations through "diplomatic channels". The pro-"Continental Bloc" Germans in Ribbentrop's entourage expected that Stalin would eventually yield, given the weakness of the Red Army. Weizsäcker commented that "we can continue for a long time" and that "war with Russia is impossible as long as we are busy with England, and afterwards it will be unnecessary". On November 14, Köstring reiterated his conviction that the Soviets indeed had no aggressive designs. On the contrary, "Molotov's trip (to Berlin) is for me just further proof of an idea that I have long held namely, that the Soviet Union wants to have peace with us, since it cannot expect any advantage from a conflict with us... The decisive factor in [evoking] the Soviet desire for peace is and remains the demonstrated strength of our army".

== Bulgarian pressure and a surprise ==
Hitler had already issued a secret directive on the eventual attempts to invade the Soviet Union. He had not yet abandoned the possibility of other political outcomes and still talked of a "great worldwide coalition that stretched from Yokohama to Spain", but he had resolved to not give up the Balkans.

Meanwhile, the Soviets immediately summoned the Bulgarian ambassador to the Foreign Ministry and stated that the Soviets needed to do a deal with the Bulgarians before they joined the Axis and that Germany was attempting to make them a puppet state. The Bulgarians turned down the offer and leaked it to Germany. Hitler still hoped to dissuade Stalin from giving guarantees to Bulgaria if the Bosporus issue could be solved, and he pressed the Bulgarian ambassador that the Soviets could be persuaded against resistance if the Bulgarians joined the pact, and he warned about the horrors of Soviet occupation.

The Soviets had meanwhile produced the biggest surprise. In an unannounced November 25 visit in Sofia, the Soviets told Bulgarian Prime Minister Bogdan Filov that if Bulgaria permitted transfer access to Soviet troops, the Soviets were prepared to drop their objections to Bulgaria's entry into the Axis, and most surprisingly, the Soviets stated that it likely would not be an issue, as it would "very probably, almost certainly" lead to the Soviets' own entry into the Axis. The stunned Filov stated that it required further contemplation. The Soviet negotiators had concluded that the Bulgarian government "is already committed to Germany to the hilt".

== Soviet counterproposal agreement ==
Stalin told the head of the Comintern, the Bulgarian Georgi Dimitrov, that Germany wanted Italy in the Balkans, but in the final analysis, it had no choice but to recognise Soviet interests in maintaining Black Sea access and to assure that the Bosporus would not be used against them.

Stalin directed Molotov to draft a new pact with a much greater scope, including the division of Europe, Asia and Africa among the four powers. On November 25, the same day as the surprise statement of Soviet nonresistance to Bulgaria's joining the Axis and a potential Soviet joining of the pact, the Soviets offered a counterproposal to Ribbentrop's draft agreement. It began, "The Soviet government is prepared to accept the draft of the Pact of Four Powers on political cooperation and economic mutual assistance". Instead of two secret protocols, Stalin proposed five:

1. German troops would depart Finland in exchange for a Soviet guarantee of continued nickel and wood shipments and peace with Finland;
2. A mutual assistance pact to be signed with Bulgaria in the next few months that would permit Soviet bases;
3. The centre of Soviet territorial domination would be south of Baku and Batumi (ports now in Azerbaijan and Georgia, south of which are Iraq and Iran);
4. Japanese renunciation of rights to northern Sakhalin, oil and coal concessions in exchange as a compensation;
5. An affirmation that the Soviet-Bulgaria mutual assistance treaty was a political necessity.

The proposals came concurrently with massively-increased economic offers. The Soviets promised by May 11, 1941, the delivery of 2.5 million tons of grain, 1 million tons above their current obligations. They also promised full compensation for Volksdeutsche property claims.

== German reaction ==
German negotiator Karl Schnurre, who could not conceal his delight over the offer, immediately telegrammed Berlin that "in view of the present status of the negotiations here, Molotov's statements today must be viewed as a surprising indication of goodwill on the part of the Soviet Government. Molotov's proposal regarding compensation for property claims in the Baltic states considerably exceeds our expectations".

Hitler, however, saw the Soviet territorial ambitions in the Balkans as a challenge to German interests and saw the plan as effectively making Bulgaria into an adjunct of the Axis Pact. On several occasions, Molotov asked German officials for their response to Moscow's counterproposals, but Germany never answered them. Germany's refusal to respond to the counterproposal worsened relations between the countries. Regarding the counterproposal, Hitler remarked to his top military chiefs that Stalin "demands more and more", "he's a cold-blooded blackmailer" and "a German victory has become unbearable for Russia" so that "she must be brought to her knees as soon as possible". Although Hitler already wished to invade the Soviet Union, he evidently wanted to accelerate it now.

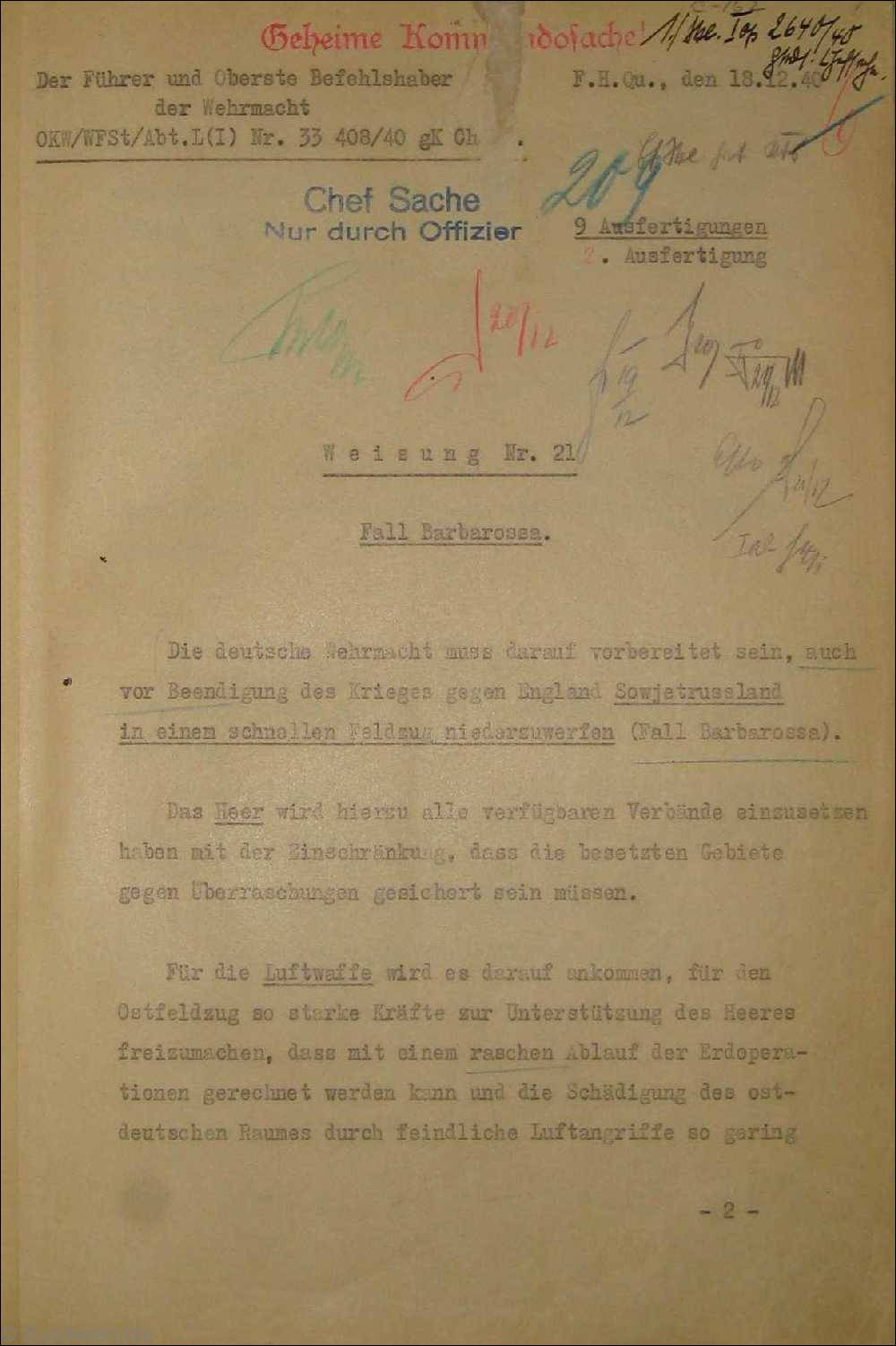
Weisung Nr. 21: Fall Barbarossa

On December 5, Hitler received military plans for the possible invasion and approved them all, with a schedule to begin in May 1941. On December 18, 1940, Hitler signed Führer Directive No. 21 to the German high command for an operation, now codenamed Operation Barbarossa, stating: "The German Wehrmacht must be prepared to crush Soviet Russia in a quick campaign". The date for the invasion was set for May 15, 1941. On the other side of the border, Stalin had anticipated an eventual war against Germany. Speaking to his generals in December, Stalin referenced Hitler's references to a Soviet attack in Mein Kampf and stated that they must always be ready to repulse a German attack, that Hitler thought that the Red Army would require four years to ready itself and so "we must be ready much earlier" and that "we will try to delay the war for another two years."

On January 17, 1941, seven days after the German–Soviet Border and Commercial Agreement, Molotov asked German officials whether the parties could then work out an agreement for entry to the Axis Pact. Molotov expressed astonishment at the absence of any answer to the Soviets' November 25 offer to join the pact, and never received an answer. On March 1, 1941, Bulgaria joined the Axis, which further unsettled Stalin after Germany had continued to ignore Stalin's November 25, 1940, Axis entry proposal. After six months of preparations, Germany invaded the Soviet Union on 22 June 1941, which ended any hope of the Soviets for the proposed alliance.

Von der Schulenburg was executed as one of the conspirators in the July 20, 1944, plot to assassinate Hitler.

== Postwar Soviet reactions: Falsifiers of History ==
In 1948, one month after Nazi government foreign ministry documents describing the negotiations had been publicly released by the United States, the Soviet Foreign Information Bureau wrote a response in a book, Falsifiers of History. After receiving translations of the newly released documents, Stalin personally edited, struck and rewrote by hand entire sections of drafts he had been given of Falsifiers before the book's release in February 1948.

In Falsifiers, Stalin claimed that he was merely "probing out" Germany in Axis negotiations and to have outright rejected Hitler's proposal to share a division of the world. That version persisted without exception in all historical studies, official accounts, memoirs and textbooks published in the Soviet Union until 1990. Later on, Soviet diplomat Victor Israelyan stated that the book "certaintly did nothing to disprove the existence of Soviet-German cooperation in the first years of World War II, a cooperation that to a certain degree assisted Hitler's plan". According to his daughter, Svetlana Alliluyeva, she "remembered her father saying after [the war]: Together with the Germans we would have been invincible".

== See also ==
- Comparison of Nazism and Stalinism
- German–Soviet Boundary and Friendship Treaty
- Molotov-Ribbentrop Pact
- Operation Pike
- National Bolshevism
- Soviet offensive plans controversy
