= Nicholas Poppe =

Russian linguist (1897–1991)

- Born: Nikolay Nikolayevich Poppe; 8 August 1897; Yantai, Shandong, China
- Died: 8 June 1991 (aged 93); Seattle, Washington, U.S.

Academic background
- Education: Petrograd University

Academic work
- Discipline: Linguist
- Institutions: University of Washington
- Main interests: Mongolic languages; Altaic languages

Nicholas Poppe (Russian: Николай Николаёвич Поппе, romanized: Nikolay Nikolayevich Poppe; 8 August 1897 – 8 June 1991) was a Russian linguist and Nazi (Gestapo) collaborator. He is also known as Nikolaus Poppe, with his first name in its German form. He is often cited as N.N. Poppe in academic publications.

Poppe was a leading specialist in the Mongolic languages and the hypothetical (and controversial) Altaic language family to which the Mongolic, Turkic, and Tungusic languages are supposed to belong. Poppe was open-minded toward the inclusion of Korean in Altaic, but regarded the evidence for the inclusion of Korean as weaker than that for the inclusion of Mongolic, Turkic, and Tungusic.

== Life ==
Poppe was born on 8 August [O.S. 27 July] 1897 in Yantai, Shandong, China. Poppe's father was stationed in China as a consular officer in the Russian diplomatic service.

Poppe's boyhood and youth were marked by wars: the Boxer Rebellion, the Russo-Japanese War, the First World War, and the Russian Civil War, which was followed by the establishment of the Soviet regime. Later, he experienced Stalin's Great Purge and the Second World War.

Poppe graduated from the Mongolian Department of the Faculty of Social Sciences of Petrograd University in 1921 where his main mentor was B. Ya. Vladimirtsov. He began teaching at the Institute for Modern Oriental Languages before he had completed his studies in 1920 at the age of 23. Three years later, in 1923, he began teaching at the University of Petrograd. In 1931, he was appointed head of the Department of Mongolian Studies in the Institute of Oriental Studies at the Soviet Academy of Sciences. In 1933, at the age of 36, he was elected as the youngest associate member of the Soviet Academy of Sciences.

During World War II, Poppe left Leningrad in 1941 while it was under threat of capture by the German military, and found work at a teaching institute in Mikoyan-Shakhar. However, he defected to the Nazis when they arrived there in August 1942. Poppe "actively collaborated in the creation of the quisling government in the Karachai minority region", which quickly rounded-up and killed the region's Jews. Poppe himself says he acted as a translator and helped the German military identify mountain passes through which to advance further into the country. After the war, Poppe condemned the actions of the SS in the Karachai region and claims he helped spare the Tats, a religiously Jewish but ethnically Iranian group of mountain people.

When the German troops retreated Poppe went with them, and in 1943 was given a job at the SS Wannsee Institut "as one of its most important intelligence experts on the USSR." The Nazi collaborators at Wannsee "prepared reliable studies for the SS and the German high command describing the location of promising targets inside the Soviet Union, including concentrations of Jews and other minority groups." Historian Christopher Simpson writes that "the Wannsee collaborators did not sign orders for executions; they just told the killers where to find their prey."

After the war ended, Poppe lived undetected in the British occupation zone in Germany until summer 1946, when the Soviet Union demanded the British hand him over under the terms of the Yalta protocol, describing Poppe as "an active agent of the Gestapo". Poppe was interrogated by British intelligence officers as part of Operation Applepie, while Foreign Office officials claimed to the Soviets that they could not find him, despite conceding in private that they were "sheltering a traitor to the Soviet Union and a war criminal." Concerned that Poppe would disclose British and American recruitment of Nazis to the Soviets, the British asked the US military to "lose" Poppe in the United States:

His presence in the British Zone is a source of embarrassment to British Military Government, as the Soviet authorities are continually asking for his return as a war criminal. The British feel that Mr. Poppe is valuable as an intelligence source and have asked me if it is possible for U.S. intelligence authorities to take him off their hands and see that he is sent to the U.S. where he can be "lost."

— Colonel Peter P Rodes, Top Secret memo of 22 May 1947

Poppe was subsequently debriefed by US Army intelligence and assigned to the "historical study group" composed of Nazis and Nazi collaborators at Camp King. He was given a false name (Joseph Alexandris) and brought to the US in May 1949 by military transport plane, with his emigration overseen by senior State Department official George F. Kennan as part of Operation Bloodstone. While in Washington DC, Poppe's work was supervised by Office of Policy Coordination officer Carmel Offie.

After a brief period working at the State Department with Nazi diplomat Gustav Hilger, Poppe joined the faculty of the Far East and Russian Institute at the University of Washington, where he taught until his retirement in 1968.

In the 1950s, Poppe aided Senator Joseph McCarthy's campaign against Professor Owen Lattimore, whom McCarthy accused of being a Soviet agent. Poppe claimed during the 1952 hearings that Lattimore's work on Mongolia was "very superficial" and told Senate investigators that Lattimore had conspired with "important Communist Party bosses" during a trip to Moscow in the 1930s. However, the committee was not informed of Poppe's work for the SS, nor of Poppe's belief that Lattimore had attempted to prevent his immigration to the US prior to 1949.

In 1968, he was awarded an honorary doctorate by the University of Bonn. He was elected a Foreign Member of the Finnish Academy of Sciences in 1968 and again in 1977.

In May 1989, a group of graduate students interested in Central and Inner Asian Studies initiated the first Nicholas Poppe Symposium. Poppe attended its first meeting in 1989 and the second in 1990. He was invited to the third meeting in May 1991 but was unable to attend on account of the state of his health.

Poppe died on 8 June 1991 in Seattle, Washington, at the age of 93.

== Academic career ==
Poppe spoke fluent Mongolian and attained an unmatched familiarity with Mongolian oral literature. His research focused on studies of the Altaic language family, especially Khalkha-Mongolian and Buryat-Mongolian, and on studies of the folklore of these and related languages. He wrote manuals and grammars of written and colloquial Khalkha-Mongolian and Buriat-Mongolian, Yakut, the Alar dialect, and Bashkir.

His publications in the realm of Mongolian oral literature include eleven volumes of Mongolian epics, collections of Mongolian sayings, songs, and fairy tales, and Mongolian versions of works in Sanskrit.

After 1949, Poppe wrote mostly in German and English, in addition to Russian. Regardless of the language he used, his writing was remarkable for its simplicity and clarity. As a result, his works are easily comprehensible to specialists and non-specialists alike.

== Works ==
Poppe was a highly prolific scholar. A bibliography of his publications from 1924 to 1987 includes 284 books and articles and 205 book reviews. Between 1949 and 1968 — a period during which he was teaching 16 to 17 hours a week at the University of Washington, with only three months in the summer for uninterrupted research — he wrote 217 works, including over 40 books.

The secret of his high productivity, as he jokingly described it, was that while other people were enjoying "the beautiful surroundings of Seattle, climbing the mountains or sailing the waters", "he sits at his desk, wearing out one typewriter after the other like other people wear out their shoes".

== Publications ==
This list of publications is based on "Nicholas Poppe Bibliography 1977–1982" by Arista Maria Cirtautas.

=== Books authored ===
- 1926
  - Yakut Grammar for students.
- 1927
  - The Chuvash and their neighbours.
  - Materials for the investigation of the Tungus language: the dialect of the Barguzin Tungus.
  - The Finno-Ugric peoples: a sketch.
- 1930
  - The Alar dialect. Part I, Phonetics and morphology
- 1931
  - The Alar dialect. Part II, Texts
  - Practical manual of colloquial Mongolian (Khalkha dialect)
  - Materials on the Solon Language
- 1932
  - Manual of Mongolian
  - Specimens of Khalkha-Mongolian folklore: North Khalkha dialect
  - Notes on the dialect of the Aga Buriat
- 1933
  - Buriat-Mongolian linguistics
  - Linguistic problems of East Siberia
- 1934
  - The language and collective farm poetry of the Buriat-Mongols of the Selenga region
- 1935
  - Annals of the Barguzin Buriats: texts and investigation
  - Annals of the Khori-Buriate. First issue: The chronicles of Tugultur Toboev and Vandan Yumsunov
- 1936
  - Annals of the Selenga Buriats. First issue: Chronicle of Ubashi Dambi Jaltsan Lombo
  - Tserenov of 1868
  - Khalkha-Mongolian structure
  - Buriat-Mongolian folkloristic and dialectological collection
- 1937
  - Khalkha-Mongolian heroic epics
  - Grammar of written Mongolian
  - Grammar of the Buriat-Mongolian language
- 1940
  - Annals of the Khori-Buriats. First issue: Chronicles of Tugultur Toboev and Vandan Yumsunov
  - Manual of Mongolian
- 1941
  - History of the Mongolian Script. Vol.1: The square script
- 1951
  - Khalkha-Mongolian grammar: with bibliography, texts, and glossary.
- 1954
  - Grammar of written Mongolian.
- 1955
  - Introduction to Mongolian comparative studies.
  - Mongolian folklore: sayings, songs, fairytales and heroic sagas.
- 1957
  - The Mongolian monuments in the 'Phagspa script
- 1960
  - Comparative grammar of the Altaic languages. Part I: Comparative phonology.
  - Buryat Grammar
- 1964
  - Bashkir manual
- 1965
  - Introduction to Altaic linguistics
- 1967
  - The twelve deeds of the Buddha: a Mongolian version of the Lalitavistara

=== Mongolian texts with English translation and notes ===
- 1970
  - Mongolian language handbook
- 1971
  - The Diamond Sutra: three Mongolian versions of the Vajracchedikaaprajnaapaaramitaa: texts, translations, notes, and glossaries
  - Khalkha-Mongolian heroic epic
- 1972
  - The language and collective farm poetry of the Buriat-Mongols of the Selenga region
- 1975
  - Mongolian epics I
  - Mongolian epics II
  - Mongolian epics III
  - Mongolian epics IV
- 1976
  - Mongolian epics V
- 1977
  - Mongolian epics VI
- 1978
  - Poppe, Nicholas (29 November 1978). Tsongol Folklore: Translation of the Collection the Language and Collective Farm Poetry of the Buriat Mongols of the Selenga Region. Harrassowitz. ISBN 9783447019422.
- 1980
  - Mongolian epics IX
- 1985
  - Mongolian epics XI
