= Molotov Remembers: Inside Kremlin Politics =

1993 book of interviews with Vyacheslav Molotov

Molotov remembers: Inside Kremlin politics: Conversations with Felix Chuev
- Author: Felix Chuev
- Translator: Albert Resis
- Language: English
- Subject: Vyacheslav Molotov
- Publisher: Ivan R. Dee, Chicago
- Publication date: 1993
- Publication place: United States
- Media type: Print
- Pages: 438
- ISBN: 1-56663-715-5

Molotov remembers: Inside Kremlin politics: Conversations with Felix Chuev is a 1993 book written by Russian biographer Felix Chuev and translated and edited by American academic Albert Resis. The 1991 Russian language version of the book was published as Sto Sorok Besed s Molotovym (140 Conversations with Molotov) with an afterword by Soviet historian Sergei Kuleshov. The English version was heavily edited and reordered by Resis into semi-chronological order. It is a frequently cited primary source for the period

== Overview ==
Molotov Remembers primarily consists of Soviet politician and diplomat Vyacheslav Molotov's interviews with Chuev. Chuev met with Molotov regularly from 1969 to 1986 (the last 17 years of the politician's life) and engaged in a series of interviews "each on the average four to five hours." From 1970 to 1977, historian Shota Kvantaliani also participated in the interviews. From these discussions, Chuev kept a diary (which reached 5,000 typewritten pages) in which he recorded "in detail every talk, every statement, and questioning and clarifying them in later meetings." Approximately 700 pages of Chuev's "Molotov Diary" were ultimately included in Molotov Remembers. The fact that Molotov did not leave memoirs highlights the significance of the book. As Chuev records, Molotov stated that he was "not interested in who said what and where, who spat on what...Lenin didn't write memoirs, nor did Stalin [...] I write about socialism – what it is and, as peasants say, 'what we need it for.'"

The dialogues in Molotov Remembers are broad in scope, covering topics that range from international affairs (with a focus on the World War II and post-War World War II period), personal remembrances of Lenin and Stalin, intra-party politics, Molotov's own expulsion from the party (he was reinstated in 1984), Marxist political theory, and the difficulties of the Soviet purges and the famine that accompanied collectivization. In summary, Molotov demonstrates his pride in the successes of the Soviet Union, while attempting to place its wrong or errors in the context of the difficulties it faced. For example, in the context of the purges during the 1930s and his own hand in them, Molotov argues that World War II might have otherwise been lost:

"Socialism demands immense effort. And that includes sacrifices. Mistakes were made in the process. But we could have suffered greater losses in the war – perhaps even defeat – if the leadership had flinched and had allowed internal disagreements, like cracks in a rock. Had leadership broken down in the 1930s we would have been in a most critical situation, many times more critical than actually turned out. I bear responsibility for this policy of repression and consider it correct. Admittedly, I have always said grave mistakes and excesses were committed, but the policy on the whole was correct."

The book is also notable for the multiple perspectives its offers on its subject. In addition to the extensive reproduction of Molotov's perspective in his own words, Chuev's authorial voice appears in many dialogues and the prefatory matter—it is generally sympathetic to Molotov. Another perspective is supplied by Resis, the editor of the English language edition, who is hostile to his subject (i.e., "In Molotov, never has a prime minister or foreign minister of a great country more zealously, proudly, and effectively served a more monstrous master and his legacy)."

== Reception ==
Kirkus Reviews describes Molotov Remembers as "the most extensive overview ever available by a Bolshevik founding father of the Soviet Union's youth and middle age."

William Taubman, writing for the Slavic Review, described the book as an "invaluable document" from offering Molotov's perspective.

Robert V. Daniels in The Russian Review wrote that Molotov's memoirs "confirm many Western surmises about certain questions in Soviet history, and contribute to a number of ongoing debates," but noted that there were gaps in his memoirs and that it lacks annotations, notes, or references. He concludes that it is "an important historical document which cannot be ignored by anyone who wishes to understand the mental climate of the Soviet regime."

Terry Martin, writing for Russian History, wrote that the book "represents a unique and remarkably valuable historical source." Martin noted that it does not provide new insight on Soviet secrets as claimed by the publisher, but rather is most useful for its look into "the mentality and political culture of the Stalinist elite." Martin is mixed on the translation, noting that Resis' editing loses the conversational format of the original in exchange for more readability.

Mark von Hagen, writing for the Political Science Quarterly, described the book as "not a memoir at all, but rather a frustratingly sloppy oral history with a confusing array of voices," and criticized the English translation as ranging from "awkward and ungrammatical... to misleading, especially when the Russian is colloquial." He criticized in particular passages where Chuev speaks for Molotov, and that Chuev often failed to press Molotov for more details. Von Hagen states the book is most useful in learning of Molotov's personal rivalries and worldview, and that it "helps confirm our suspicions that Stalin's circle fought hard and often fatal battles over major policy decisions and rarely were united in their opinions about the direction of the country."
