= Albert Resis =

American historian (1921–2021)

- Born: December 16, 1921; United States
- Died: March 10, 2021 (aged 99); DeKalb, Illinois, U.S.
- Occupation: Historian

Albert Resis (December 16, 1921 – March 10, 2021) was an American academic and writer in the field of Russian history. He worked as a professor of history at Northern Illinois University from 1964 to 1992, and then as a professor emeritus from 1992.

He was the author of the books Stalin, the Politburo and the Onset of the Cold War: 1945-1946 (1988) and Molotov Remembers: Inside Kremlin Politics, together with Russian author Felix Chuev (1993). He was also the main author of a number of articles in Encyclopædia Britannica on Russian and Soviet history.

Resis died in DeKalb, Illinois, in March 2021, at the age of 99.
