= Gustav Hilger =

German diplomat

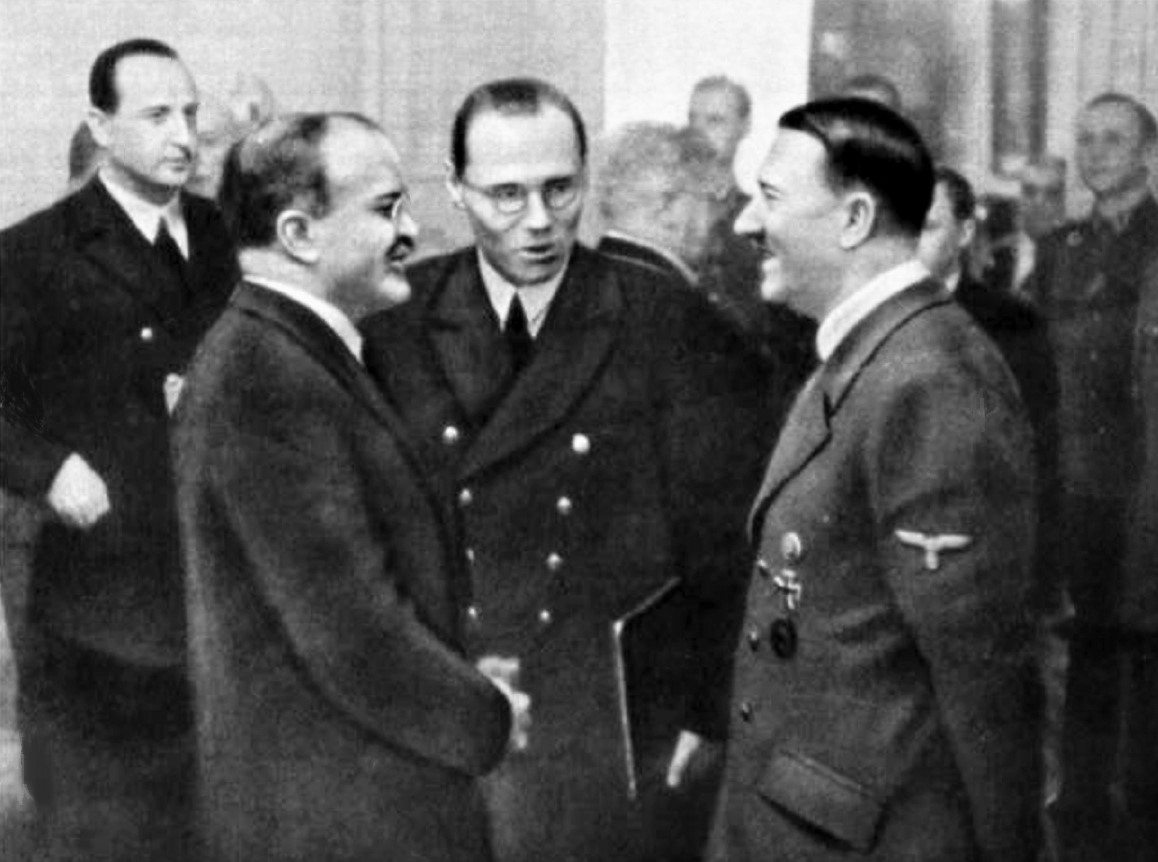
Gustav Hilger (centre) at a meeting of Molotov and Hitler, Berlin, 1940.

Gustav Arthur Hilger (September 11, 1886 – July 27, 1965) was a German diplomat and expert on the Soviet Union. He was best known for his role in German–Soviet relations during the interwar period as a counselor at the German embassy in Moscow. After World War II, he advised the United States and the West German governments on Soviet issues. Hilger worked under the CIA aliases Stephen H. Holcomb and Arthur T. Latter. Joseph Stalin said of Hilger: "German heads of state and German ambassadors to Moscow came and went - but Gustav Hilger remained".

== Life ==
Born in Moscow, the son of a German businessman, Hilger spent most of his life in Russia until 1941. After World War I and the Russian Civil War, Hilger advocated German rapprochement with the Soviet Union and helped negotiate closer economic ties and the Molotov–Ribbentrop Pact. In 1941, he warned Adolf Hitler and German Foreign Minister Joachim von Ribbentrop against invading the Soviet Union but to no effect. After Operation Barbarossa, Hilger was expelled from Russia and returned to Berlin, where he served as a deputy to Ribbentrop in the German Foreign Office. Responsible for advising Ribbentrop on eastern issues, Hilger received activity reports of the Einsatzgruppen from the Reich Security Main Office and was aware of the Holocaust in the East.

In 1945, Hilger surrendered himself to allied occupation officials in Salzburg. He was brought to a secret military interrogation camp in Fort Hunt, Virginia, where US Army Intelligence interrogated him, along with other captured German military and civilian officials.

American intelligence officials considered Hilger's knowledge of the Soviet Union and German wartime activities in Eastern Europe to be valuable. In 1946, Hilger returned to Germany as an analyst for the Gehlen Organization, the intelligence agency of the American occupation zone in Germany. In 1948, with the help of Carmel Offie and George Kennan, Hilger and his wife moved to Washington, DC, where he consulted for the State Department and the Office of Policy Coordination.

In 1953, he published The Incompatible Allies: A Memoir-History of German–Soviet Relations, 1918–1941 with support from the Russian Research Center of Harvard University.

Having acted as an unofficial envoy of Konrad Adenauer in Washington, Hilger returned in 1953 to West Germany, where he was a Counselor at the Foreign Office in Bonn until he retired in 1956. He then received a full pension for continuous civil service from 1923 to 1956. Hilger was awarded the Federal Cross of Merit in 1957, and he continued to provide informal advice to West German and American officials until his death in 1965.

Although Hilger was never prosecuted for war crimes or atrocities committed under the Third Reich, controversy has surrounded his complicity in the activities of the Foreign Office during the Nazi period and his postwar employment by the US and the West German governments.
