= Gliwice =

City in Silesian Voivodeship, Poland

Gliwice Glywice/Glajwic (Silesian)
- City county
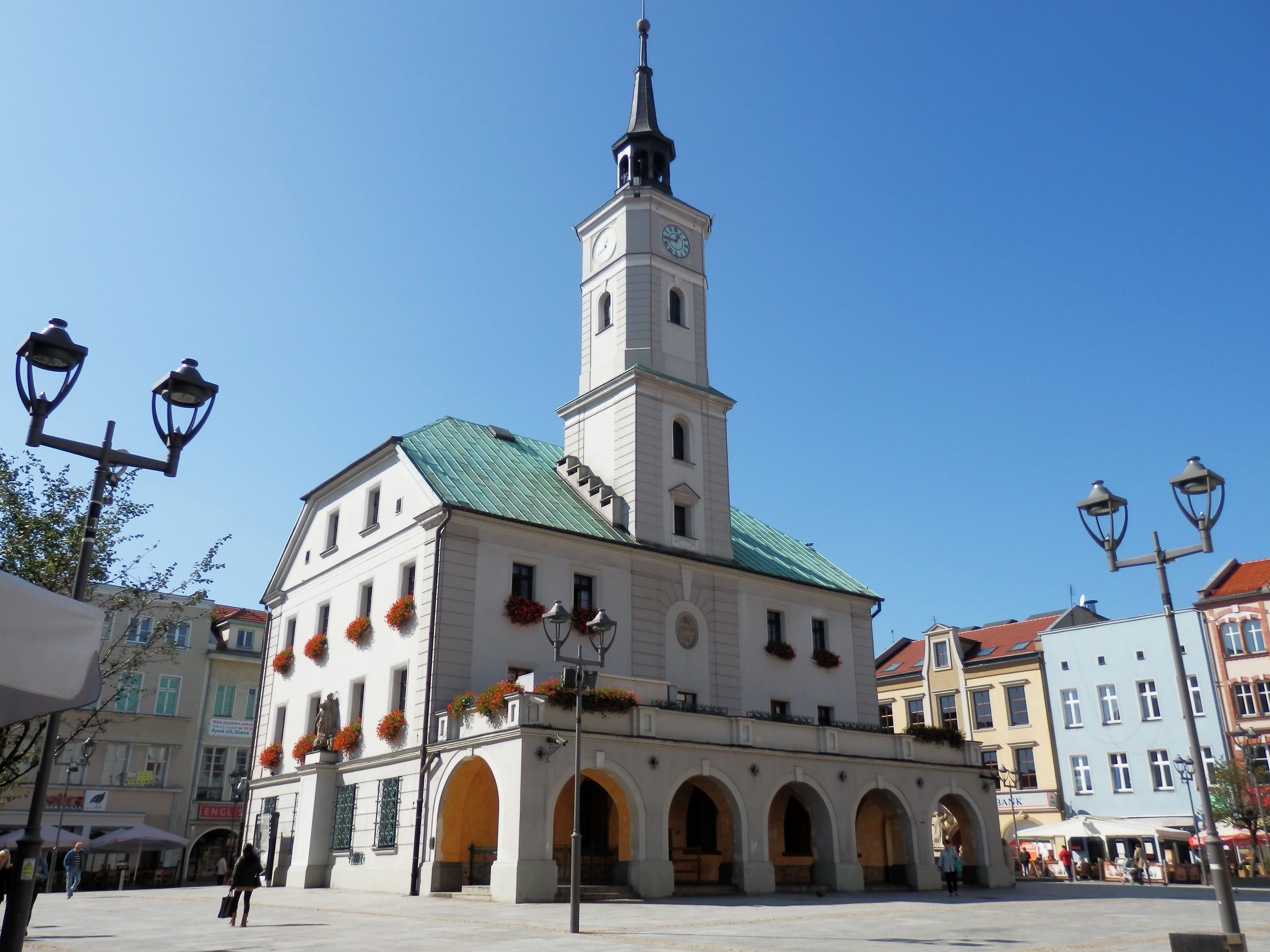
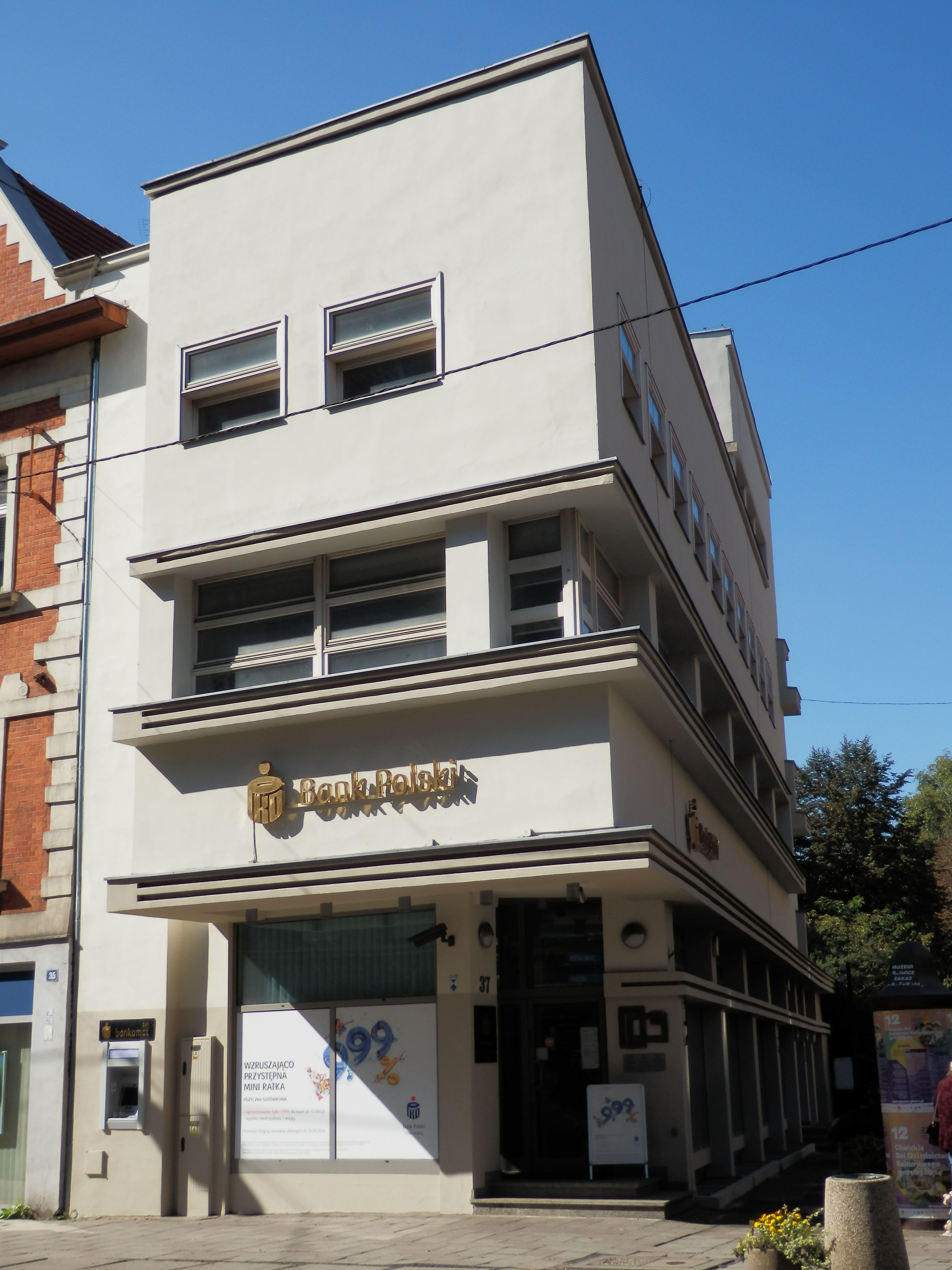
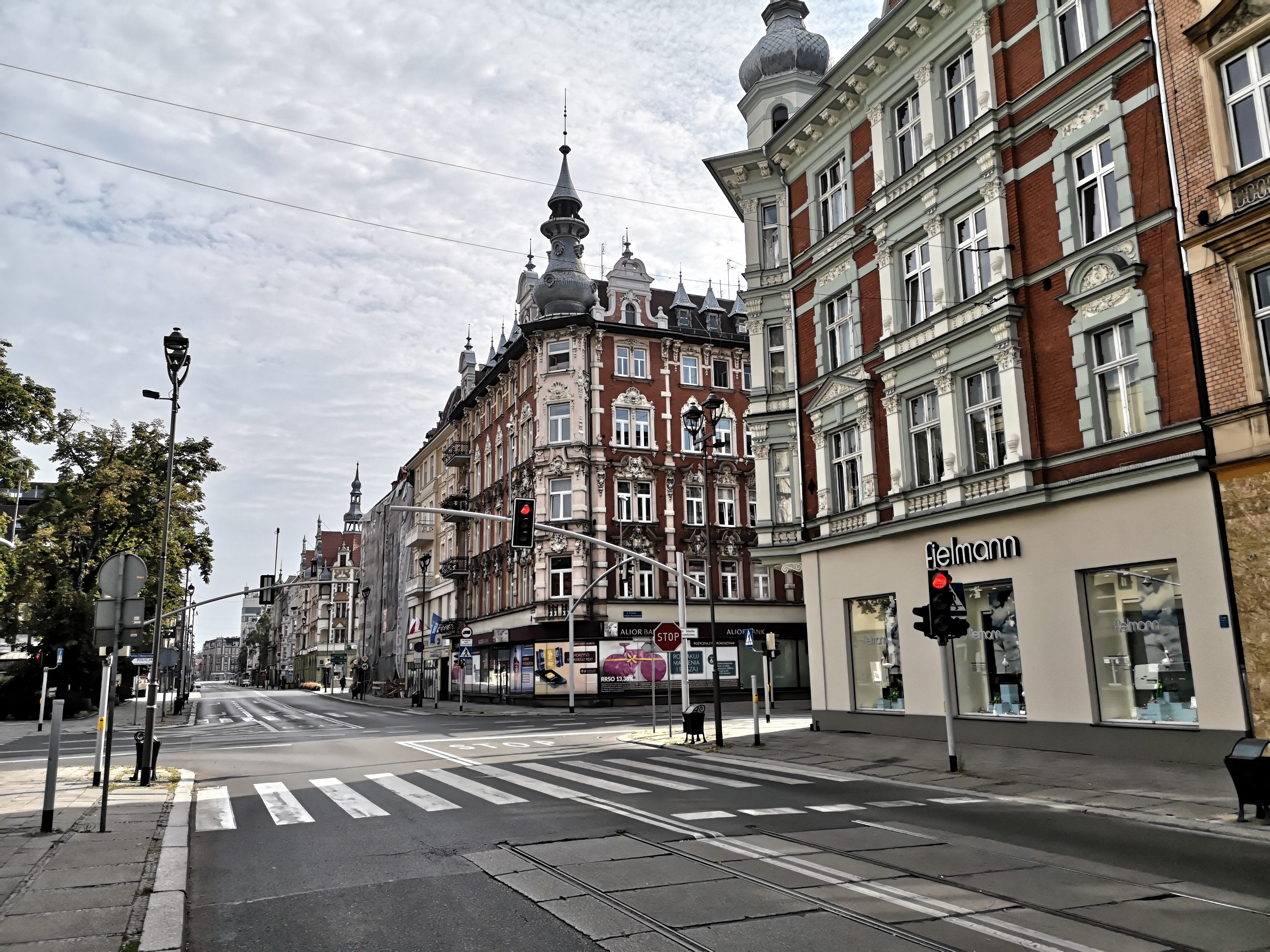
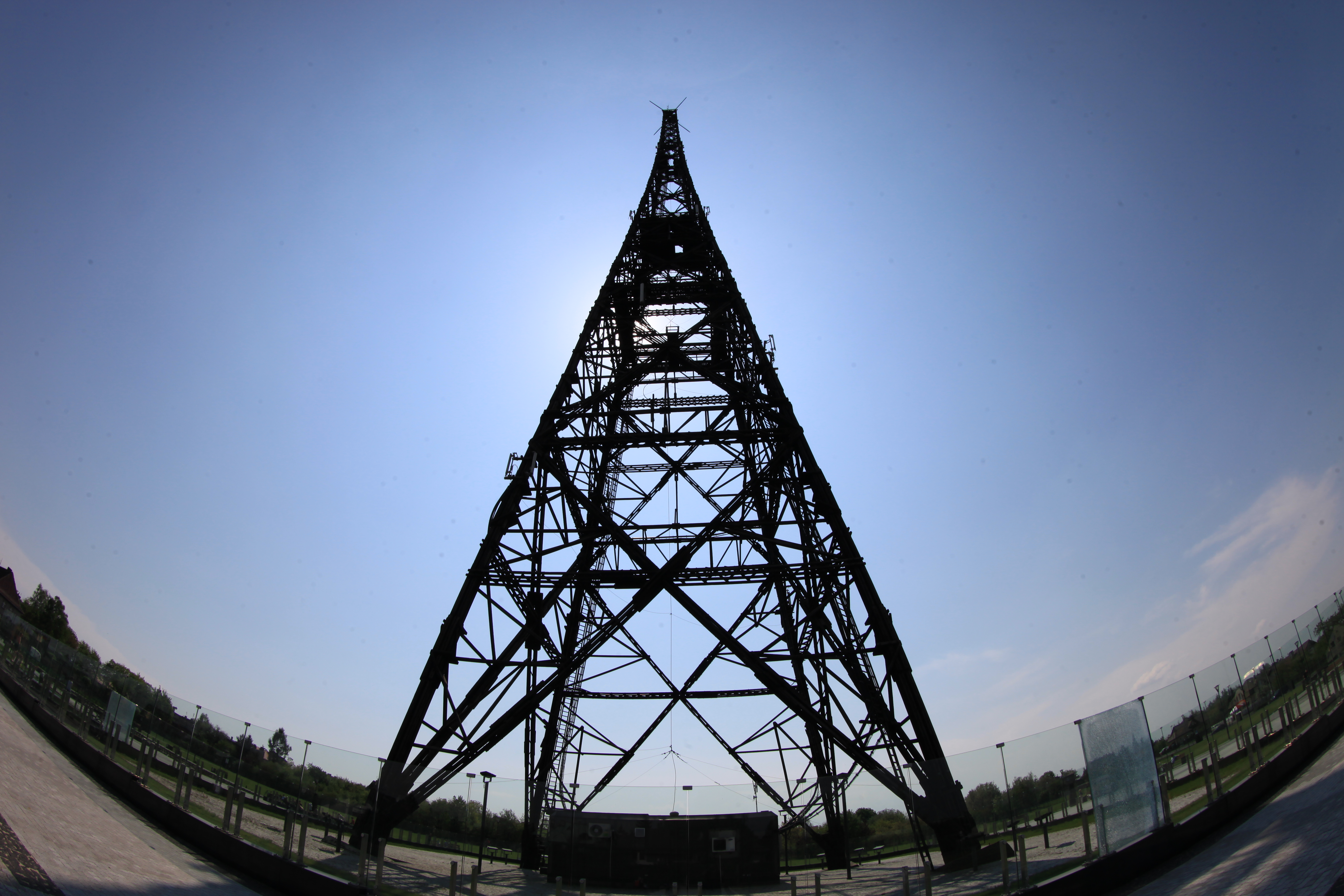
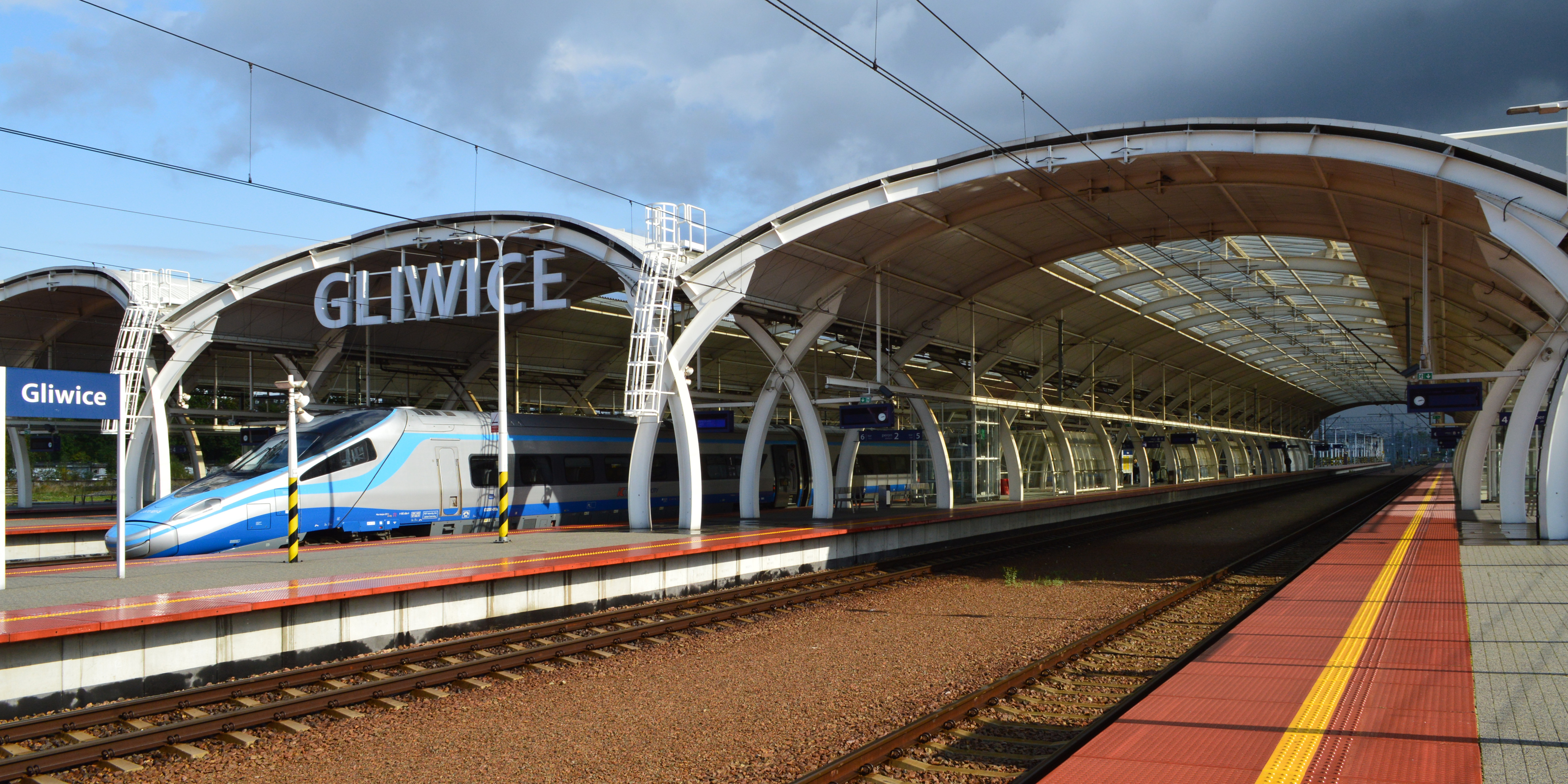
- Left to right: Gliwice Town Hall and Old Town; Weichmann House by Erich Mendelsohn; Zwycięstwa (Victory) Street; Gliwice Radio Tower; Main Train Station

- Flag Coat of arms

- Location within Poland
- Coordinates: 50°17′39″N 18°39′57″E
- Country: Poland
- Voivodeship: Silesian Voivodeship
- County: city county
- Established: 13th century
- City rights: 1250

Government
  - City mayor: Katarzyna Kuczyńska-Budka (KO)

Area
  - City county: 134.2 km^{2} (51.8 sq mi)
- Highest elevation: 278 m (912 ft)
- Lowest elevation: 200 m (660 ft)

Population (31 December 2021)
  - City county: 166 942▼ (19th)
  - Density: 1,330/km^{2} (3,400/sq mi)
  - Urban: 2,746,000
  - Metro: 4,620,624
- Time zone: UTC+1 (CET)
  - Summer (DST): UTC+2 (CEST)
- Postal code: 44-100 to 44-164
- Area code: +48 32
- Car plates: SG
- Climate: Cfb
- Primary airport: Katowice Airport
- Website: http://www.gliwice.eu/

Gliwice (Polish: [ɡliˈvit͡sɛ]; Silesian: Glywice/Glajwic, Czech: Hlivice/Glivice; German: Gleiwitz) is a city in Upper Silesia, in southern Poland. The city is located in the Silesian Highlands, on the Kłodnica river (a tributary of the Oder).

Gliwice is the westernmost city of the Metropolis GZM, a conurbation of 2.0 million people, and is the third-largest city of this area, with 175,102 permanent residents as of 2021. It also lies within the larger Katowice-Ostrava metropolitan area which has a population of about 5.3 million people and spans across most of eastern Upper Silesia, western Lesser Poland and the Moravian-Silesian Region in the Czech Republic. Gliwice is bordered by three other cities and towns of the metropolitan area: Zabrze, Knurów and Pyskowice. It is one of the major college towns in Poland, thanks to the Silesian University of Technology, which was founded in 1945 by academics of Lwów University of Technology. Over 20,000 people study in Gliwice. Gliwice is an important industrial center of Poland. Following an economic transformation in the 1990s, Gliwice shifted from steelworks and coal mining to automotive and machine industry.

Founded in the 13th century, Gliwice is one of the oldest cities in Upper Silesia, with a preserved Old Town core. Gliwice's most historical structures include St Bartholomew's Church (15th century), Gliwice Castle and city walls (14th century), Armenian Church (originally a hospital, 15th century) and All Saints Old Town Church (15th century). Gliwice is also known for its Radio Tower, where the Gleiwitz incident took place shortly before the outbreak of World War II and which is thought to be the world's tallest wooden construction, as well as Weichmann Textile House, one of the first buildings designed by world-renowned architect Erich Mendelsohn. Gliwice hosted the Junior Eurovision Song Contest 2019 which took place on 24 November 2019.

== Etymology ==
The name of the city is derived from the Slavic root gliw or gliv, suggesting terrain characterized by loam or wetland.

== History ==
=== Early history ===
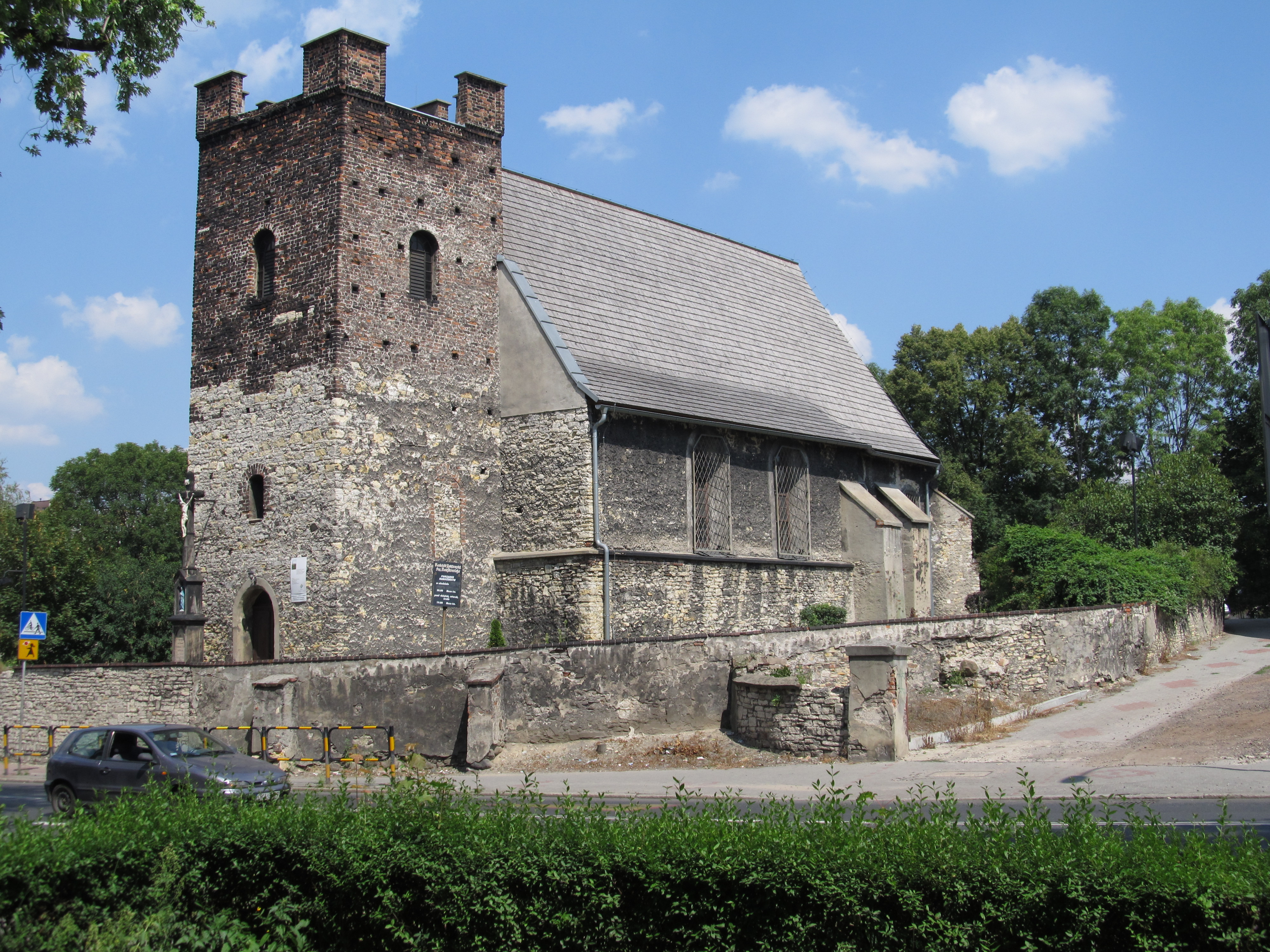
Medieval fortified Old Saint Bartholomew church, one of the oldest structures of Gliwice

Gliwice was first mentioned as a town in 1276, however, it was granted town rights earlier by Duke Władysław Opolski of the Piast dynasty. It was located on a trade route connecting Kraków and Wrocław and was part of various Piast-ruled duchies of fragmented Poland: Opole until 1281, Bytom until 1322, from 1322 to 1342 Gliwice was a capital of the Duchy of Gliwice, afterwards again part of the Duchy of Bytom until 1354, later it was also ruled by other regional Polish Piast dukes until 1532, although in 1335 it fell under the suzerainty of the Bohemian Crown, which itself was part of the Holy Roman Empire, and passed with that crown under suzerainty of the Austrian Habsburgs in 1526.

According to 14th-century writers, the town seemed defensive in character, when under rule of Siemowit of Bytom. In the Middle Ages the city prospered mainly due to trade and crafts, especially brewing.

On 17 April 1433, Gliwice was captured by the Duke Bolko V, who joined the Hussites after they captured Prudnik.

=== Early Modern Age ===
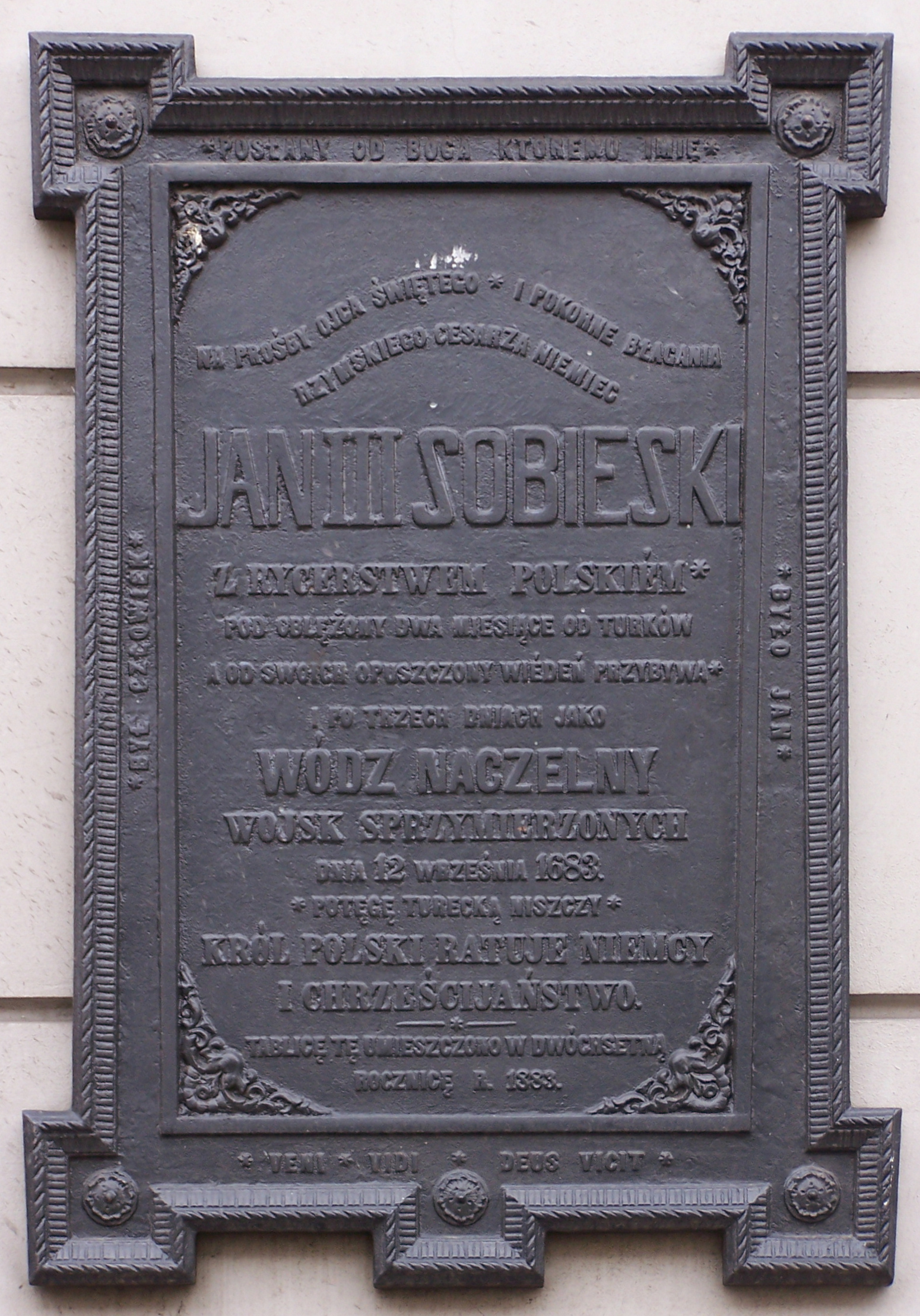
An 1863 Polish plaque at the Town Hall commemorating Polish King John III Sobieski to 200th anniversary of the Battle of Vienna

After the dissolution of the Duchy of Opole and Racibórz in 1532, it was incorporated as Gleiwitz into the Habsburg monarchy. Because of the vast expenses incurred by the Habsburg monarchy during their 16th century wars against the Ottoman Empire, Gleiwitz was leased to Friedrich Zettritz for the amount of 14,000 thalers. Although the original lease was for a duration of 18 years, it was renewed in 1580 for 10 years and in 1589 for an additional 18 years. Around 1612, the Reformed Franciscans came from Kraków, and then their monastery and Church of the Exaltation of the Holy Cross were built. The city was besieged or captured by various armies during the Thirty Years' War. In 1645 along with the Duchy of Opole and Racibórz it returned to Poland under the House of Vasa, and in 1666 it fell to Austria again. In 1683, Polish King John III Sobieski stopped in the city before the Battle of Vienna. In the 17th and 18th century, the city's economy switched from trading and brewing beer to clothmaking, which collapsed after the 18th-century Silesian Wars.

During the mid 18th century Silesian Wars, Gleiwitz was taken from the Habsburg monarchy by the Kingdom of Prussia along with the majority of Silesia. After the end of the Napoleonic Wars, Gleiwitz was administered in the Prussian district of Tost-Gleiwitz within the Province of Silesia in 1816. In the 19th century, the city was visited by writers Julian Ursyn Niemcewicz, Wincenty Pol, Honoré de Balzac and Józef Ignacy Kraszewski. The city was incorporated with Prussia into the German Empire in 1871 during the unification of Germany. In 1897, Gleiwitz became its own Stadtkreis, or urban district.

=== Industrialization ===
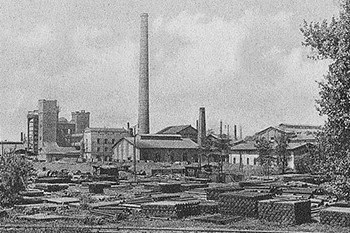
Iron foundry in c. 1900

The first coke-fired blast furnace on the European continent was constructed in Gleiwitz in 1796 under the direction of John Baildon. Gleiwitz began to develop into a major city through industrialization during the 19th century. The town's ironworks fostered the growth of other industrial fields in the area. The city's population in 1875 was 14,156. However, during the late 19th century Gleiwitz had: 14 distilleries, 2 breweries, 5 mills, 7 brick factories, 3 sawmills, a shingle factory, 8 chalk factories and 2 glassworks.

Other features of the 19th-century era industrialized Gleiwitz were a gasworks, a furnace factory, a beer bottling company, and a plant for asphalt and paste. Economically, Gleiwitz opened several banks, savings and loan associations, and bond centers. Its tram system was completed in 1892, while its theater was opened in 1899; until World War II, Gleiwitz's theatre featured actors from throughout Europe and was one of the most famous theatres in the whole of Germany. Despite Germanisation policies, the Poles established various Polish organizations, including the "Sokół" Polish Gymnastic Society, and published local Polish newspapers.

=== 20th century ===
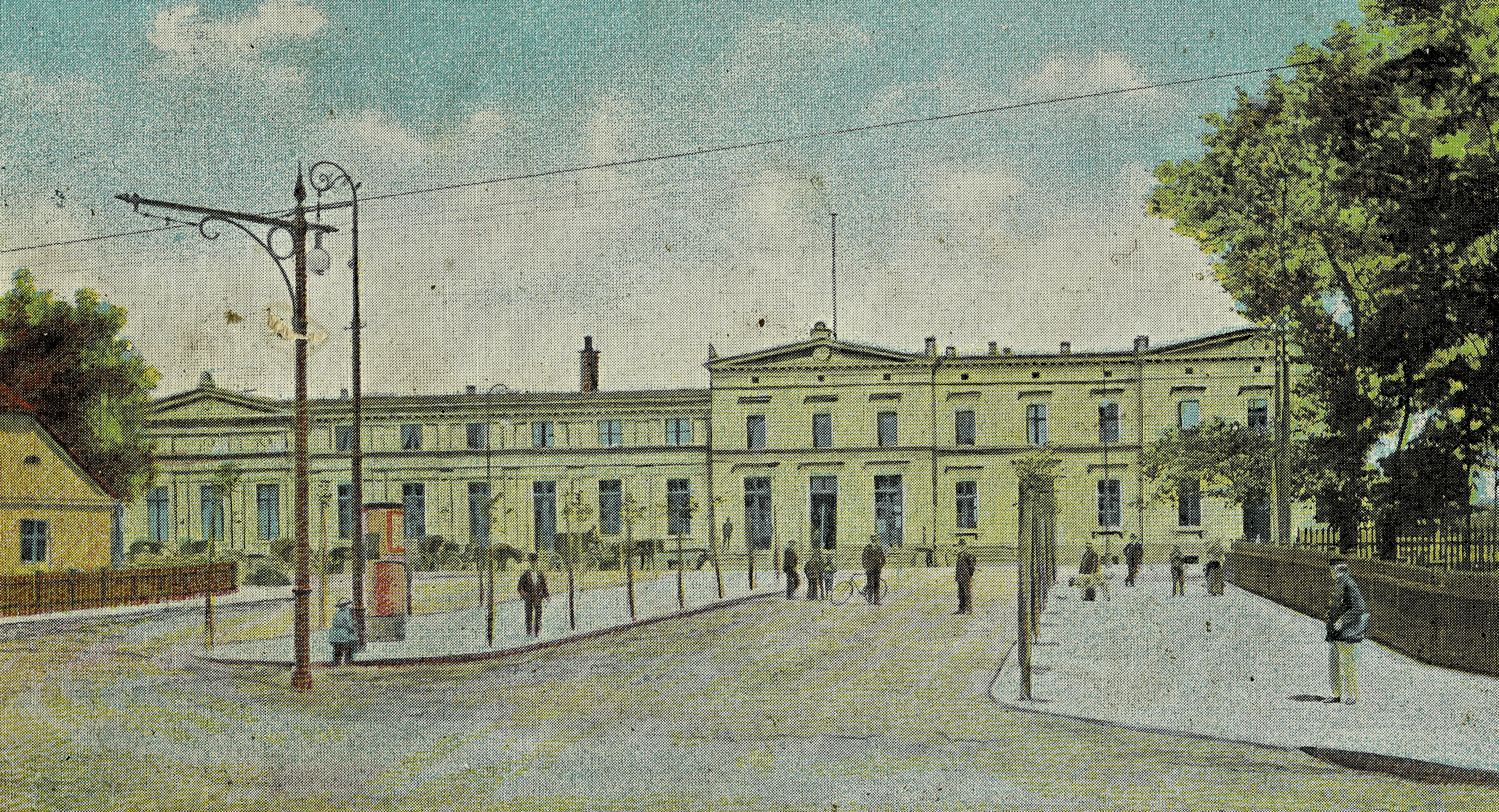
Main railway station in c. 1908

According to the 1911 Encyclopædia Britannica, Gleiwitz's population in 1905 was 61,324. By 1911, it had two Protestant and four Roman Catholic churches, a synagogue, a mining school, a convent, a hospital, two orphanages, and a barracks. Gleiwitz was the center of the mining industry of Upper Silesia. It possessed a royal foundry, with which were connected machine factories and boiler works.

After the end of World War I, clashes between Poles and Germans occurred during the Polish insurrections in Silesia. Some ethnically Polish inhabitants of Upper Silesia wanted to incorporate the city into the Second Polish Republic, which had just regained independence. On 1 May 1919, a Polish rally was held in Gliwice. Seeking a peaceful solution to the conflict, the League of Nations held a plebiscite on 20 March 1921 to determine which country the city should belong to. In Gleiwitz, 32,029 votes (78.7% of given votes) were for remaining in Germany, Poland received 8,558 (21.0%) votes, and 113 (0.3%) votes were declared invalid. The total voter turnout was listed as 97.0%. The majority in the present-day districts (then surrounding villages) of Brzezinka, Czechowice, Łabędy, Ostropa, Sośnica, Stare Gliwice, Wójtowa Wieś and Żerniki opted to reintegrate with Poland, with the result ranging from 55.7% voting for Poland in Łabędy to 80.2% in Czechowice, while in the present-day districts of Ligota Zabrska and Bojków 56.5% and 98.3%, respectively, voted to remain in Germany. The results prompted another insurrection by Poles. The League of Nations determined that three Silesian cities: Gleiwitz (Gliwice), Hindenburg (Zabrze) and Beuthen (Bytom) would remain in Germany, and the eastern part of Upper Silesia with its main city of Katowice (Kattowitz) would join restored Poland. After delimiting the border in Upper Silesia in 1921, Gliwice found itself in Germany, but near the border with Poland – nearby Knurów was already in Poland.

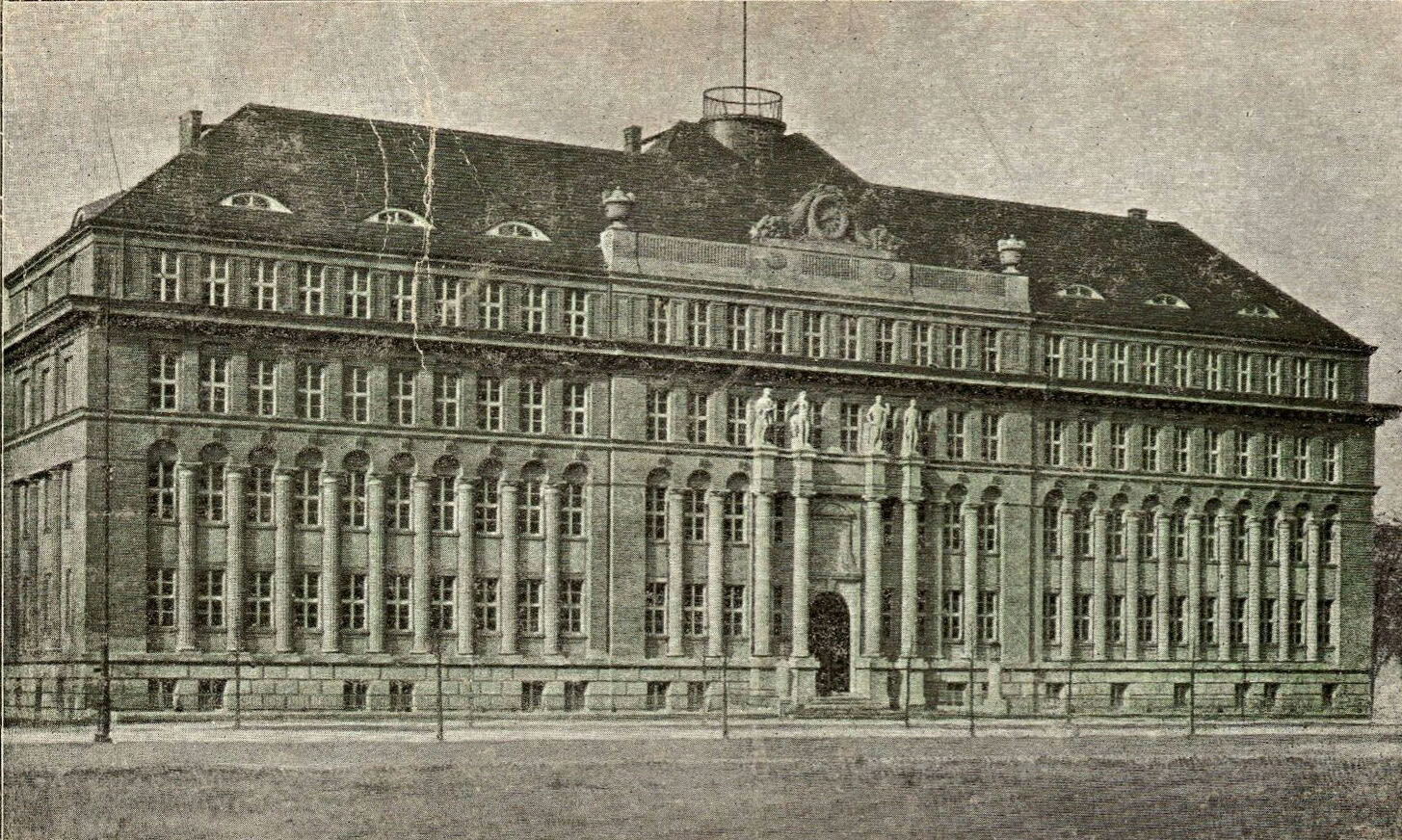
The present Administrative Court building in the 1920s

During the interbellum the city witnessed not only anti-Polish, but also anti-French incidents and violence by the Germans. In 1920, local Polish doctor and city councillor Wincenty Styczyński, protested against the German refusal to treat French soldiers stationed in the city. In January 1922, he himself treated French soldiers shot in the city. On 9 April 1922, 17 Frenchmen died in an explosion during the liquidation of a German militia weapons warehouse in the present-day Sośnica district. Styczyński, who defended the rights of local Poles and protested against German acts of violence against Poles, was himself murdered by a German radical/militant on 18 April 1922. Nevertheless, various Polish organizations and enterprises still operated in the city in the interbellum, including a local branch of the Union of Poles in Germany, Polish banks and a scout troop.

On 9 June 1933, Gliwice was the site of the first conference of the Nazi anti-Polish organization Bund Deutscher Osten in Upper Silesia. In a secret Sicherheitsdienst report from 1934, Gliwice was named one of the main centers of the Polish movement in western Upper Silesia. Polish activists were increasingly persecuted starting in 1937.

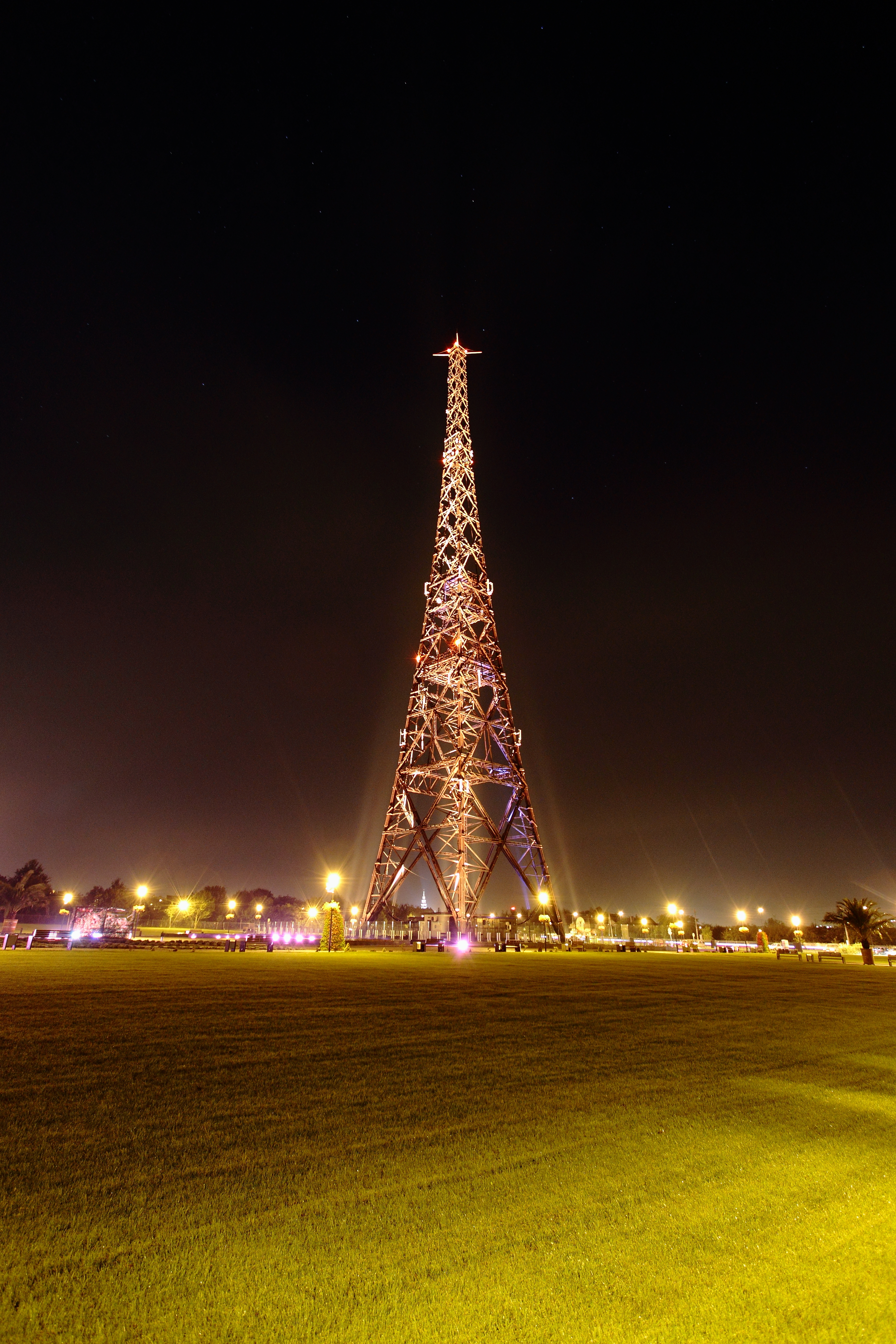
Gliwice Radio Tower

The Gleiwitz incident was a false-flag attack on a radio station in Gleiwitz on 31 August 1939, staged by the German secret police, which served as a pretext, devised by Reinhard Heydrich under orders from Hitler, for Nazi Germany to invade Poland, and which marked the start of the Second World War. Shortly after the outbreak of the war, on 4 September 1939, the Einsatzgruppe I entered the city to commit atrocities against Poles. After the invasion of Poland, the assets of local Polish banks were confiscated by Germany. The Germans formed a Kampfgruppe unit in the city. It was also the cremation site of many of around 750 Poles murdered in Katowice in September 1939.

In early 1940, the advanced shaped charge explosive developed for the attack on Fort Ében-Émael as part of the Blitzkrieg attack on the Maginot Line on 10 May 1940 were tested at places in Gleiwitz to ensure secrecy.

During the war, the Germans operated a Dulag transit camp for Polish prisoners of war, and a Nazi prison in the city, and established numerous forced labour camps, including a Polenlager camp solely for Poles, a camp solely for Jews, a penal "education" camp, a subcamp of the prison in Strzelce Opolskie, and six subcamps of the Stalag VIII-B/344 prisoner of war camp. In October 1943, the Germans brought a large transport of Italian POWs to a forced labour camp in today's Łabędy district. From July 1944 to January 1945, Gliwice was the location of four subcamps of the Auschwitz concentration camp. In the largest subcamp, whose prisoners were mainly Poles, Jews and Russians, nearly 100 either died of hunger, mistreatment and exhaustion or were murdered. During the evacuation of another subcamp, the Germans burned alive or shot 55 prisoners who were unable to walk. There are two mass graves of the victims of the early 1945 death march from Auschwitz in the city, both commemorated with monuments.

During the final stages of the war, 124 inhabitants committed suicide fearing the advancing Red Army. On 24 January 1945, Gliwice was occupied by the Red Army. Soviet troops then murdered over 1,000 civilians, mostly women, children and elders. In February 1945, the Soviets carried out deportations of local men to Soviet mines. Under borders changes dictated by the Soviet Union at the Potsdam Conference, Gliwice fell inside Poland's new borders after Germany's defeat in the war. It was incorporated into Poland's Silesian Voivodeship on 18 March 1945, after almost 300 years of being outside of Polish rule.

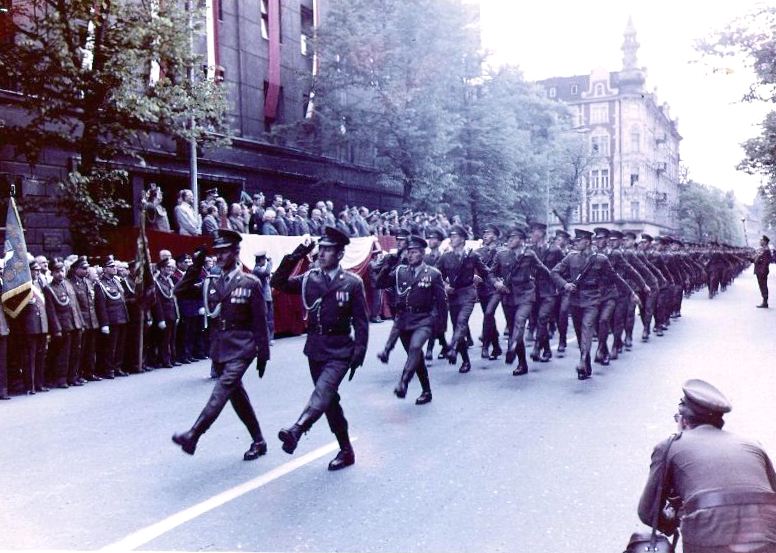
Parade of the Polish Border Protection Forces in 1978

In 1956, Gliwice was the site of a manifestation of solidarity with the Hungarian Revolution of 1956, and local Poles raised funds and donated blood for the Hungarian insurgents (see also Hungary–Poland relations).

== Demographics ==
=== Population development ===
Historical population
Year	Pop.	±%
1950	119,968	—
1960	135,300	+12.8%
1970	172,000	+27.1%
1980	197,467	+14.8%
1990	214,202	+8.5%
2000	205,092	−4.3%
2010	195,472	−4.7%
2020	177,049	−9.4%

The earliest population estimate of Gliwice from 1880, gives 1,159 people in 1750. The same source cites population to have been 2,990 in 1810, 6,415 in 1838, and 10,923 in 1861. A census from 1858 reported the following ethnic makeup: 7,060 - German, 3,566 - Polish, 11 - Moravian, 1 - Czech. Since the Industrial Revolution, Gliwice saw rapid economic growth which fuelled fast population increase. In 1890, Gliwice had 19,667 inhabitants, and this number has increased over twofold over the next 10 years to 52,362 in 1900. Gliwice gained its status of a large city (Großstadt in German) in 1927, when population reached 102,452 people.

In 1945, with the approaching Red Army, a significant number of residents were either evacuated or fled the city at their own discretion. Following the Yalta Conference, Gliwice, along most of Silesia, was incorporated into communist Poland, and the remaining German population was expelled. Ethnic Poles, some of them themselves expelled from the Polish Kresy (which were incorporated into Soviet Union), started to settle down in Gliwice.

As of 31 December 2016, Gliwice's population stood at 182,156 people, a decrease of 1,236 over the previous year.

=== Nationality, ethnicity and language ===
Historically, Gliwice was ethnically diverse, initially inhabited by Poles, later it had a German majority as a result of German colonization, with a significant autochthonous Polish minority. In the Upper Silesian Plebiscite in 1921, 78.9 percent of voters opted for Germany (however 15.1 percent of the vote in Gliwice was cast by non-residents, who are believed to overwhelmingly vote for Germany across the region). After Germany's defeat in World War II, the Germans either fled or were displaced to Allied-occupied Germany in accordance with the Potsdam Agreement. Polish inhabitants remained in Gliwice, and were joined by Poles displaced from former eastern Poland annexed by the Soviet Union, including the city of Lwów (Lviv), Volhynia, Polesie, the Wilno region (Vilnius region) and the Grodno region. In addition, Poles from other regions of Poland, including the vicinity of Kielce, Rzeszów, Łódź or Poznań, as well as Poles from other countries, settled in Gliwice. Many of these new inhabitants were academics from the Lwów Polytechnic who created the Silesian University of Technology.

According to the 2011 Polish Census, 93.7 percent of people in Gliwice claimed Polish nationality, with the biggest minorities being Silesians (or both Poles and Silesians at the same time) at 9.7 percent (18,169 people) and Germans at 1.3 percent (2,525). 0.3 percent declared another nationality, and the nationality of 2.1 percent of people could not be established. These numbers do not sum up to 100 percent as responders were allowed to choose up to two nationalities. The most common languages used at home were Polish (97.7 percent), Silesian (2.3 percent), German (0.7 percent) and English (0.4 percent).

=== Religion ===
Selected historic churches of Gliwice

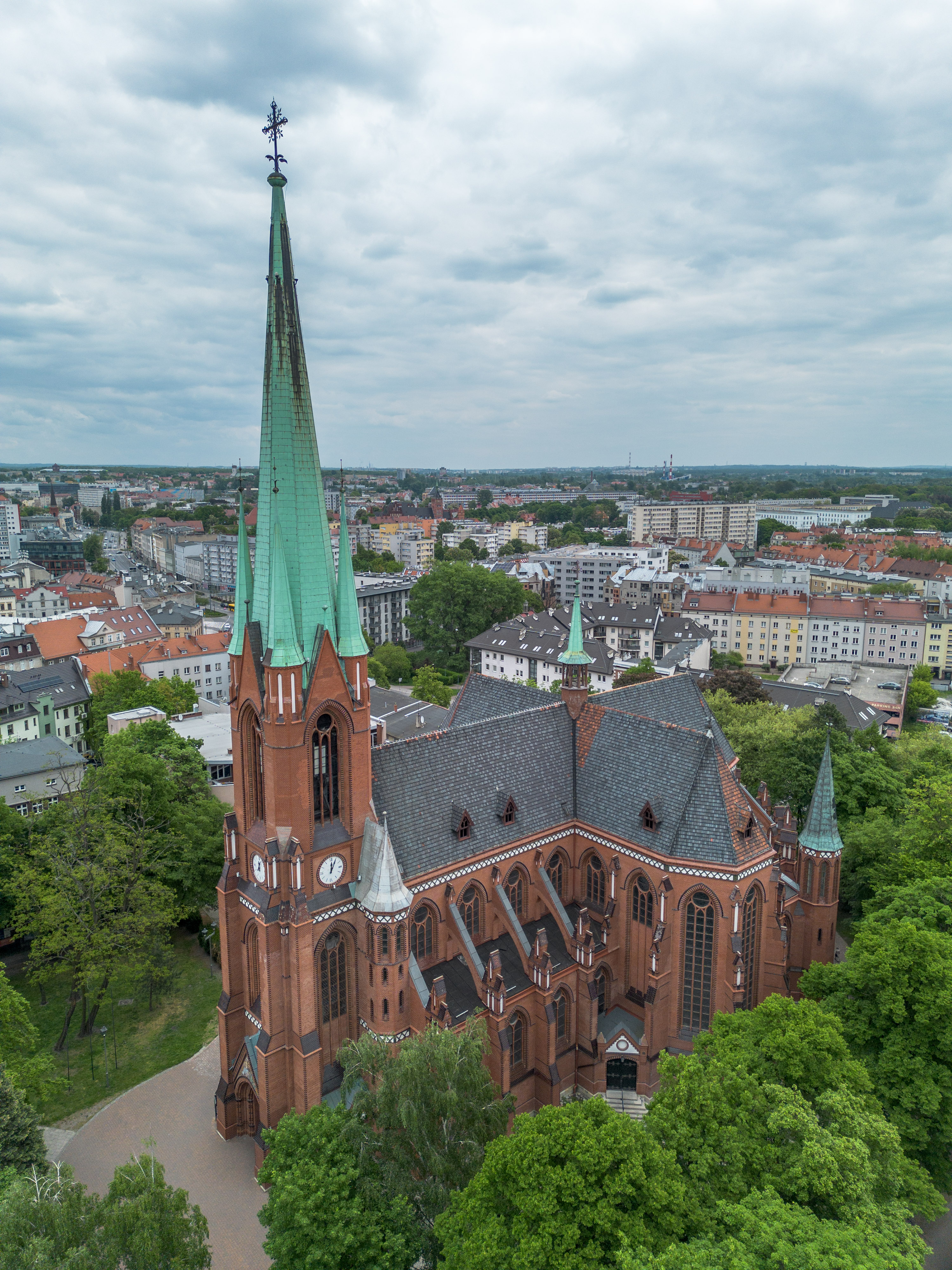
Sts. Peter and Paul Cathedral

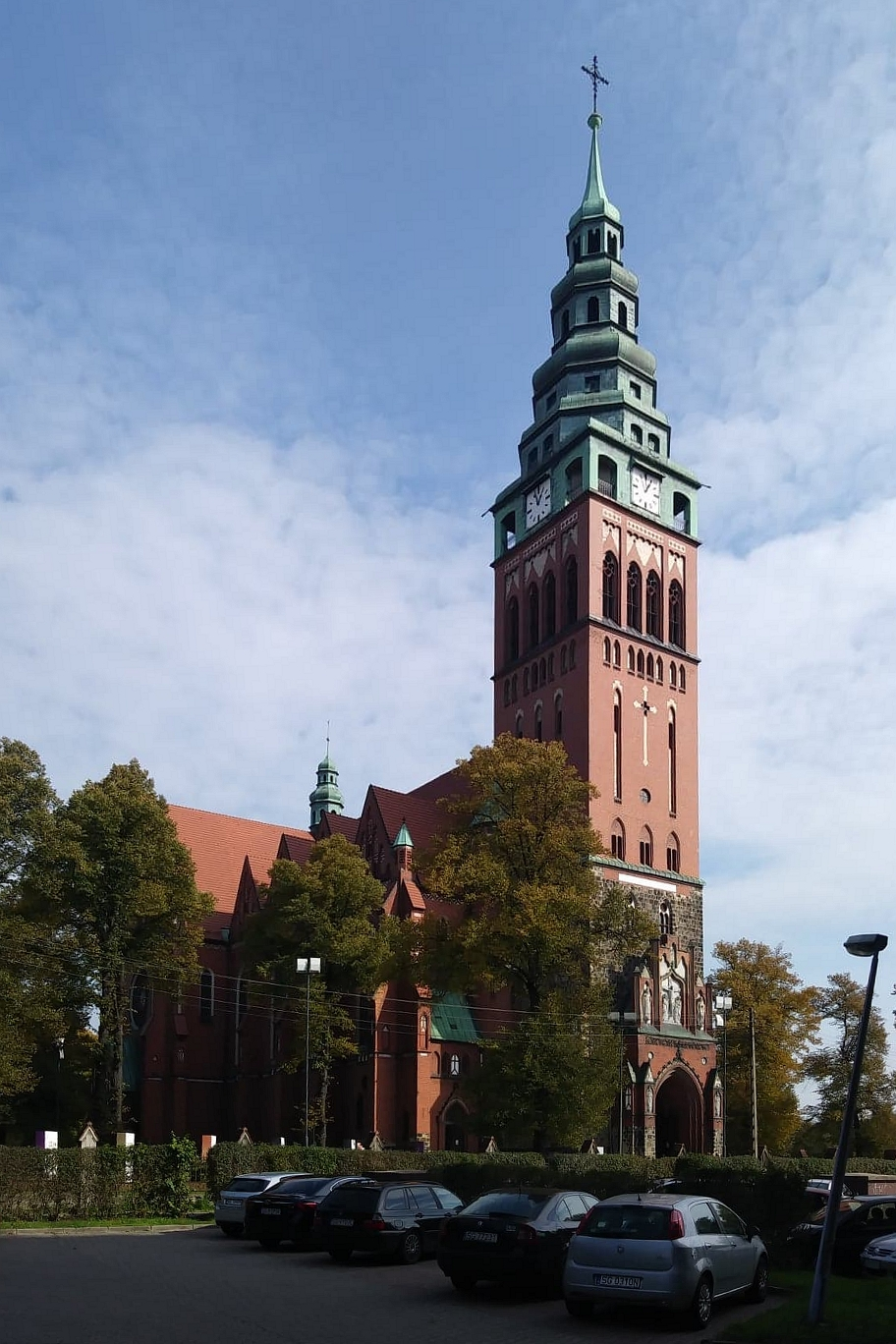
Saint Bartholomew Church

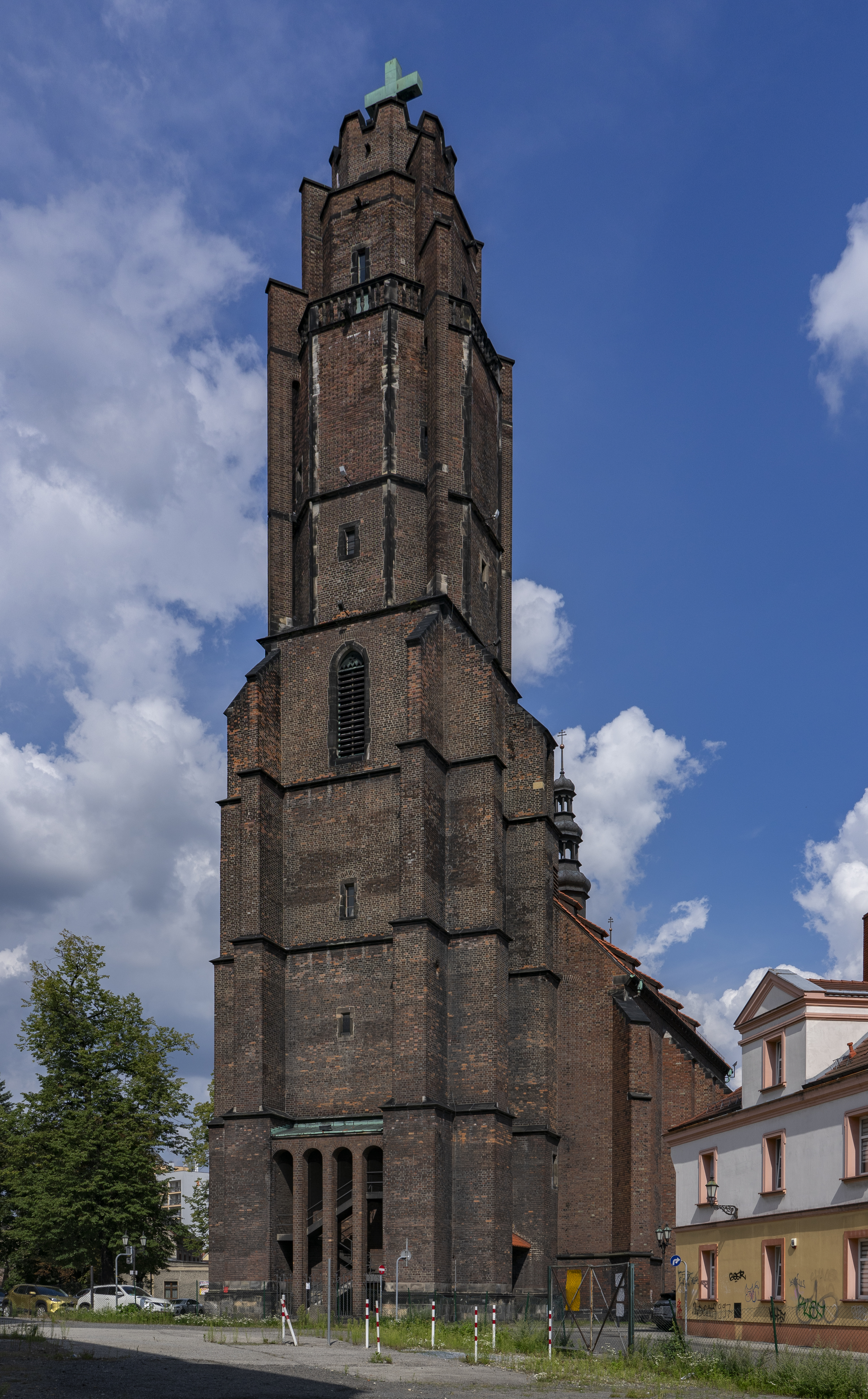
All Saints church

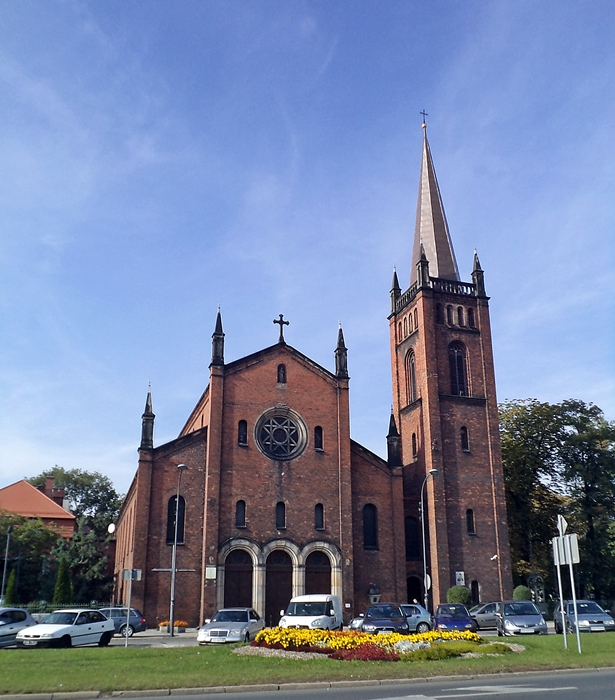
Saint Barbara Church

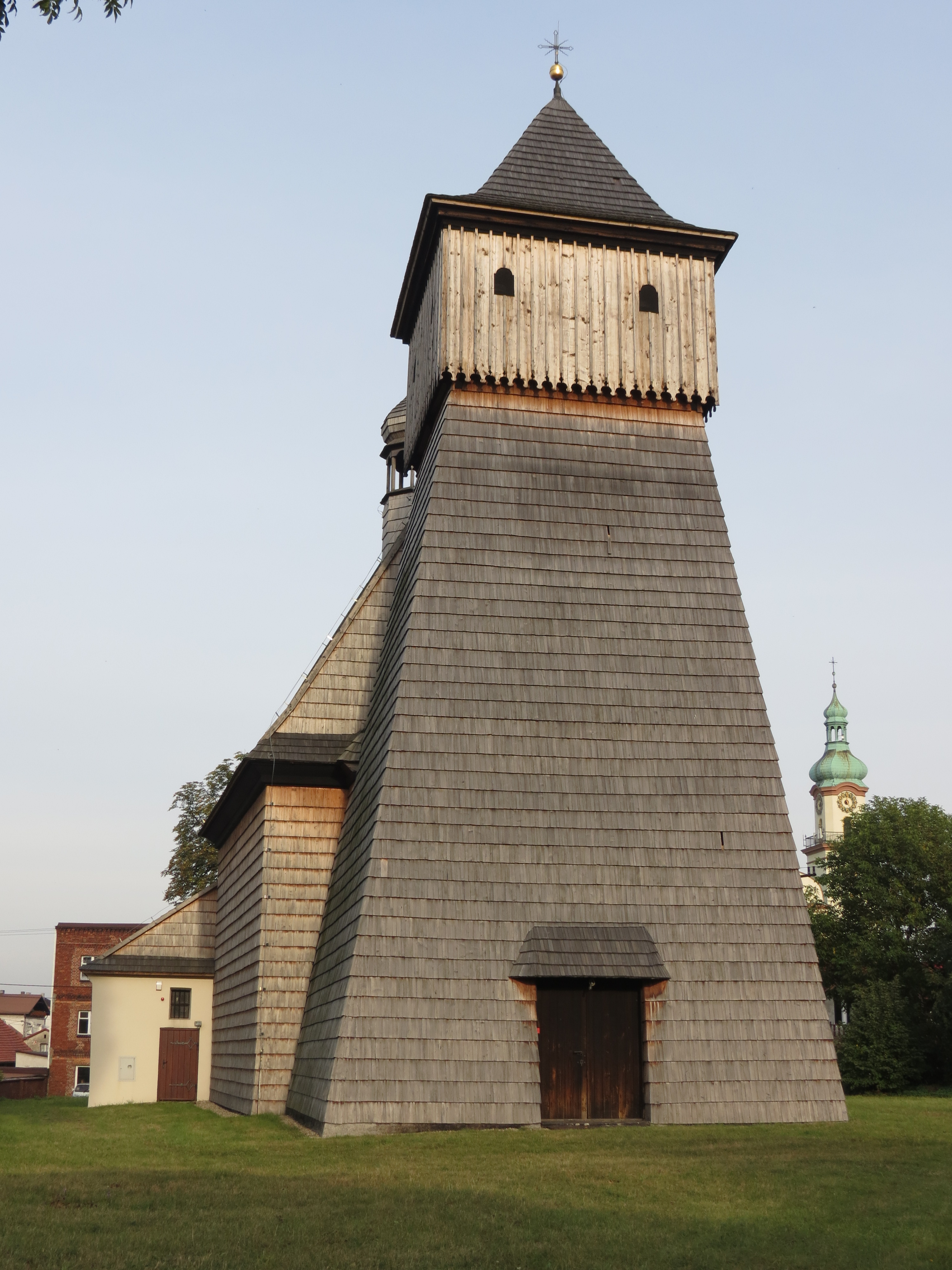
Saint George church

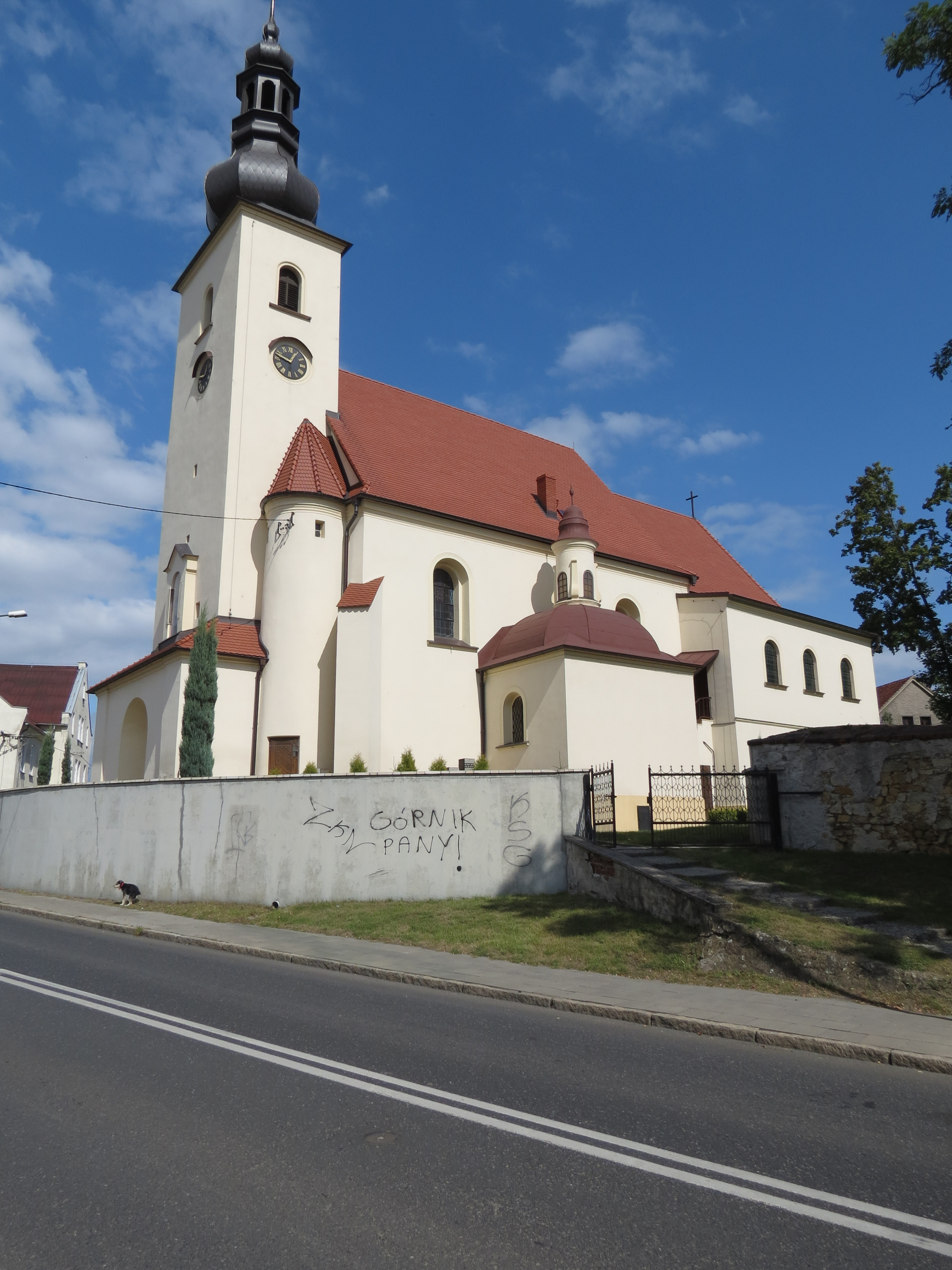
Assumption church

Except for a short period immediately after Reformation, Gliwice has always had a Catholic majority, with sizeable Protestant and Jewish minorities. According to the population estimate in 1861, 7,476 people (68.4 percent) were Catholic, 1,555 (14.2 percent) Protestant, and 1,892 Jewish (17.3 percent, highest share in city history).

Currently, as of 2011 census, 84.7 percent of inhabitants claim they belong to a religion. The majority – 82.73 percent – belongs to the Catholic Church. This is significantly lower than the Polish average, which is 89.6 and 88.3 percent, respectively. According to the Catholic Church in Poland, weekly mass attendance in the Diocese of Gliwice is at 36.7 percent of obliged, on par with Polish average. Other larger denominations include Jehovah's Witnesses (0.56 percent or 1,044 adherents) and Protestants (0.37 percent or 701 adherents).

Gliwice is the seat of the Roman Catholic Diocese of Gliwice, which has 23 parish churches in the city. Gliwice is also the seat of one of the three Armenian Church parishes in Poland (the other being in Warsaw and Gdańsk), which is subject to the Holy See directly. Other denominations present in the city include a Greek Catholic Church parish, an Evangelical Church of Augsburg Confession parish, a Methodist parish, 9 Jehovah Witnesses halls (including one offering English-language services), several evangelical churches, a Buddhist temple and a Jewish prayer house.

==== Jews in Gliwice ====
Gliwice's Jewish population reached its height in 1929 at approximately 2,200 people, but started to decline in the late 1930s, as the Nazi Party gained power in Germany, of which Gliwice was then a part. In 1933, there were 1,803 Jews living in the city; this number had dropped by half (to 902) by 1939 due to emigration. Between 1933 and 1937, Jews living in Upper Silesia enjoyed somewhat less legal persecution compared to Jews in other parts of Germany, thanks to the Polish-German Treaty of Protection of Minorities' Rights in Upper Silesia. This regional exception was granted thanks to the Bernheim petition that Gliwice citizen Franz Bernheim filed against Nazi Germany with the League of Nations. The New Synagogue was destroyed in 1938 during the Nazi November pogroms known as Kristallnacht. During the Holocaust, Jews from Gliwice were transported to Auschwitz-Birkenau in 1942 and 1943.

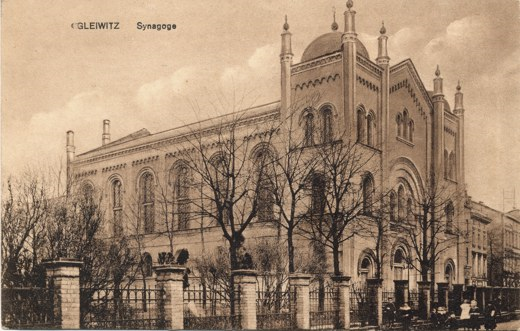
Former synagogue in c. 1920

Only 25 Jews from Gliwice's pre-war Jewish population survived World War II in the city, all of them being in mixed marriages with gentiles. Immediately after the war, Gliwice became a congregation point for Jews who had survived the Holocaust, with the Jewish population standing at around a 1,000 people in 1945. Since then, the number of Jews in Gliwice has declined as survivors moved to larger cities or emigrated to Israel, the United States, and other western countries. Currently, Gliwice's Jewish community is estimated at around 25 people and is part of the Katowice Jewish Religious Community.

Gliwice has one Jewish prayer house, where religious services are held every Sabbath and on holidays. It is located in the house that the Jewish Religious Community elected in 1905.

Notable members of the Jewish community in Gliwice include:

- Wilhelm Freund (1806–1894), philologist and director of the Jewish school.
- Oscar Troplowitz (1863–1918), German pharmacist, owner of Beiersdorf AG and inventor of Nivea skin cream.
- Eugen Goldstein (1850–1930), German physicist, discoverer of anode rays, sometimes credited for the discovery of the proton.
- Julian Kornhauser (b. 1946), Polish poet and father of current first lady Agata Kornhauser-Duda, born in Gliwice to a Jewish father and Polish Silesian mother from Chorzów.

== Sights and architecture ==
Various sights of Gliwice

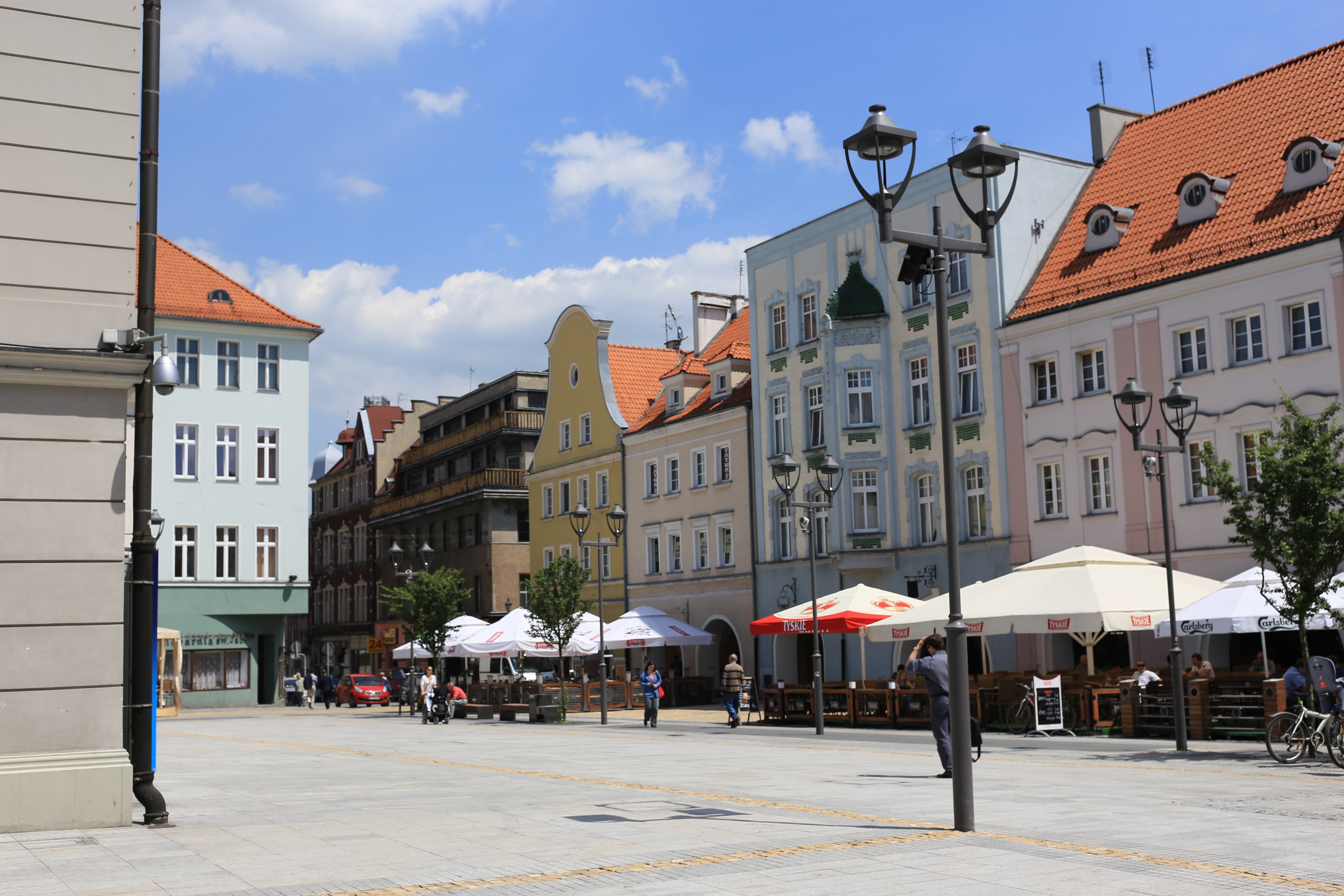
Colourful townhouses at the Market Square

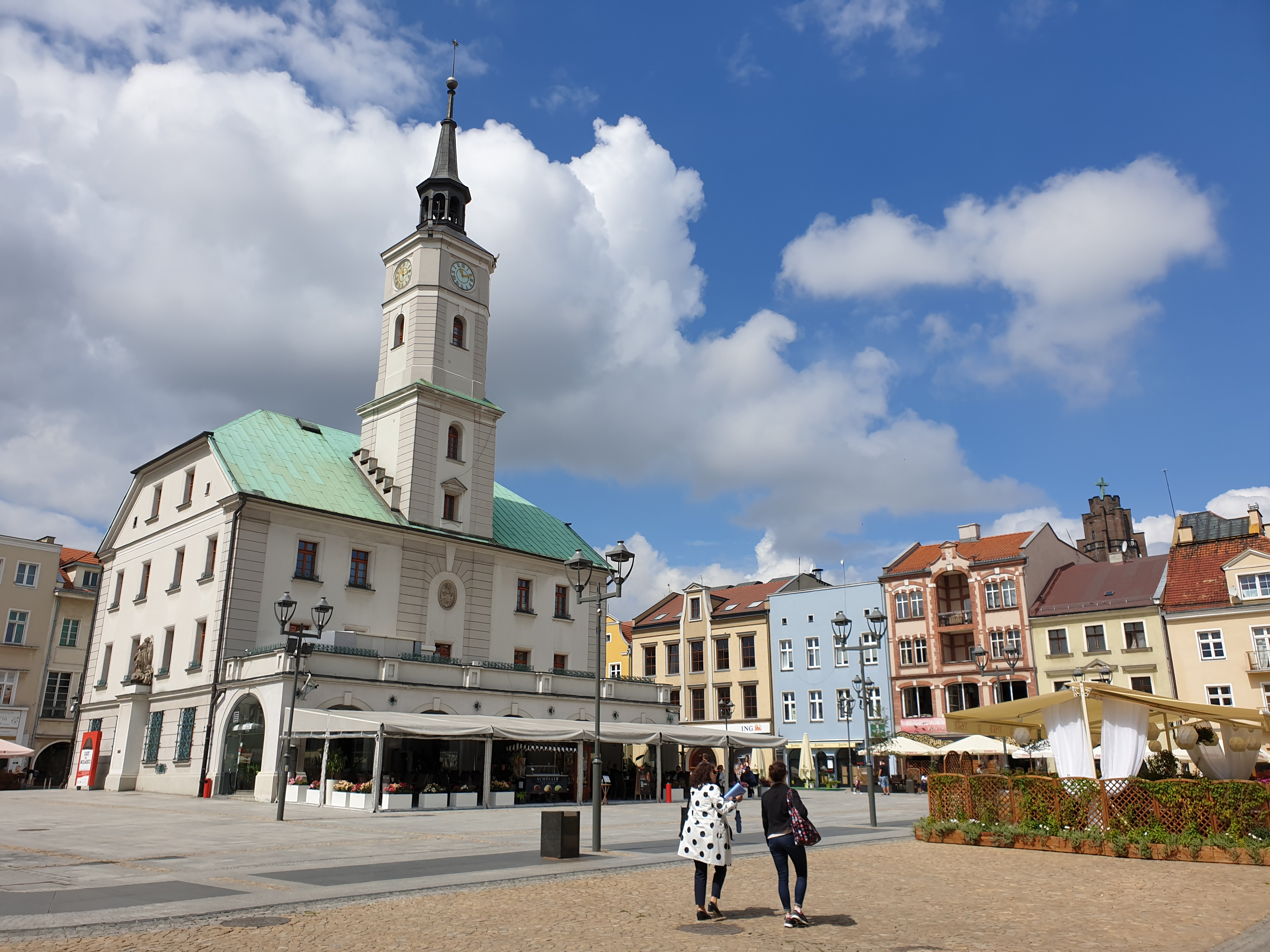
Town Hall at the Market Square

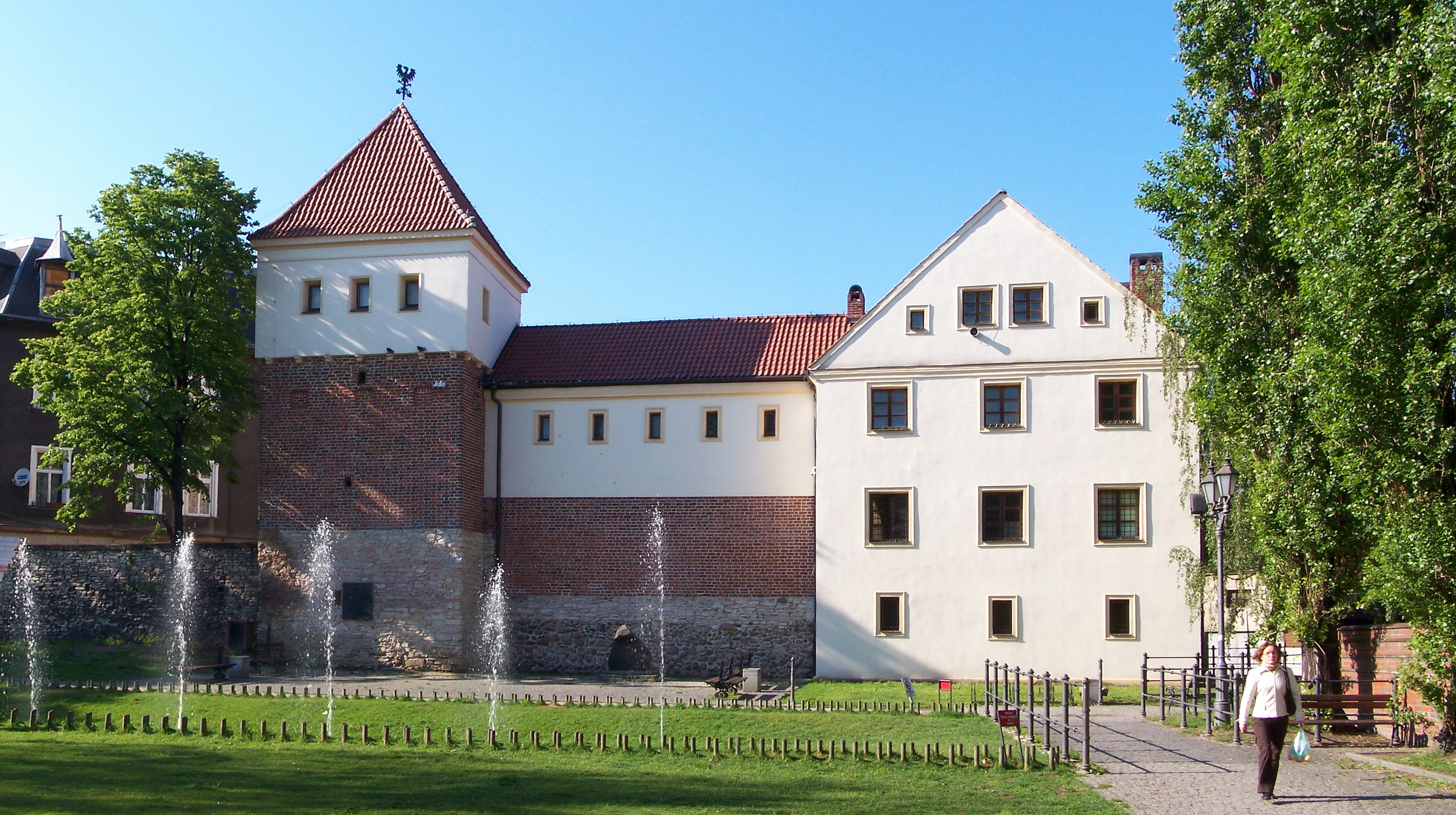
Piast Castle

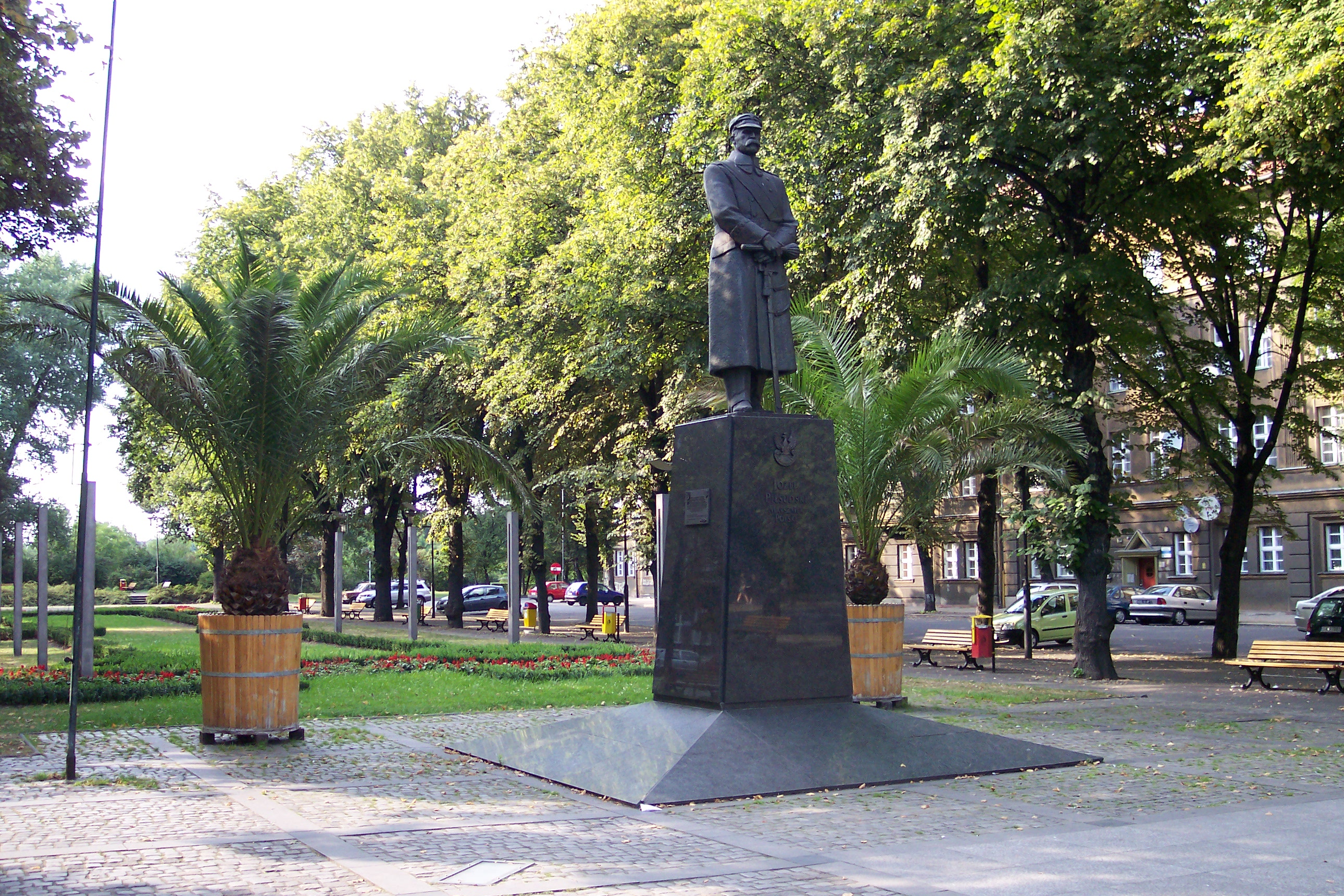
Józef Piłsudski monument

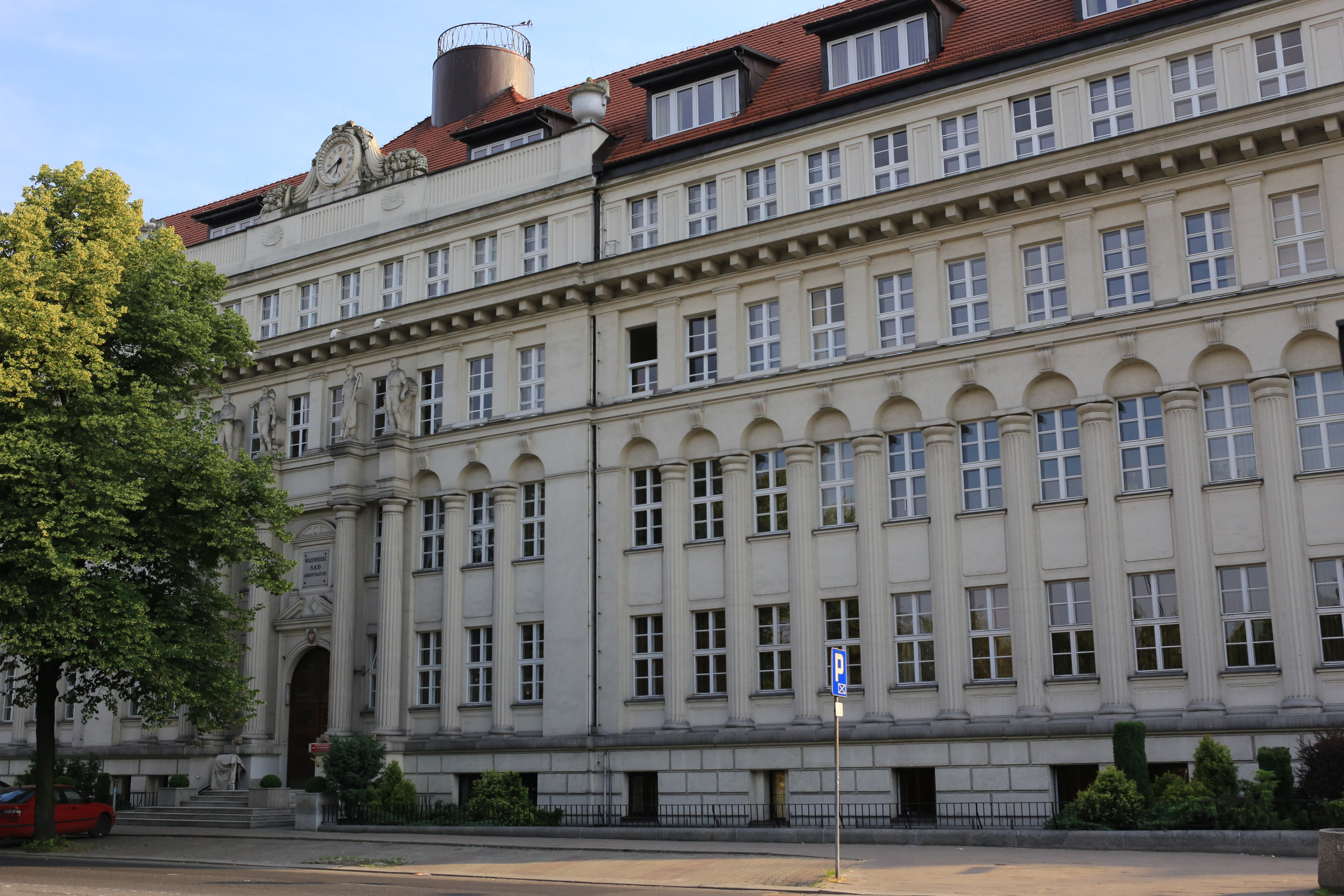
Administrative Court

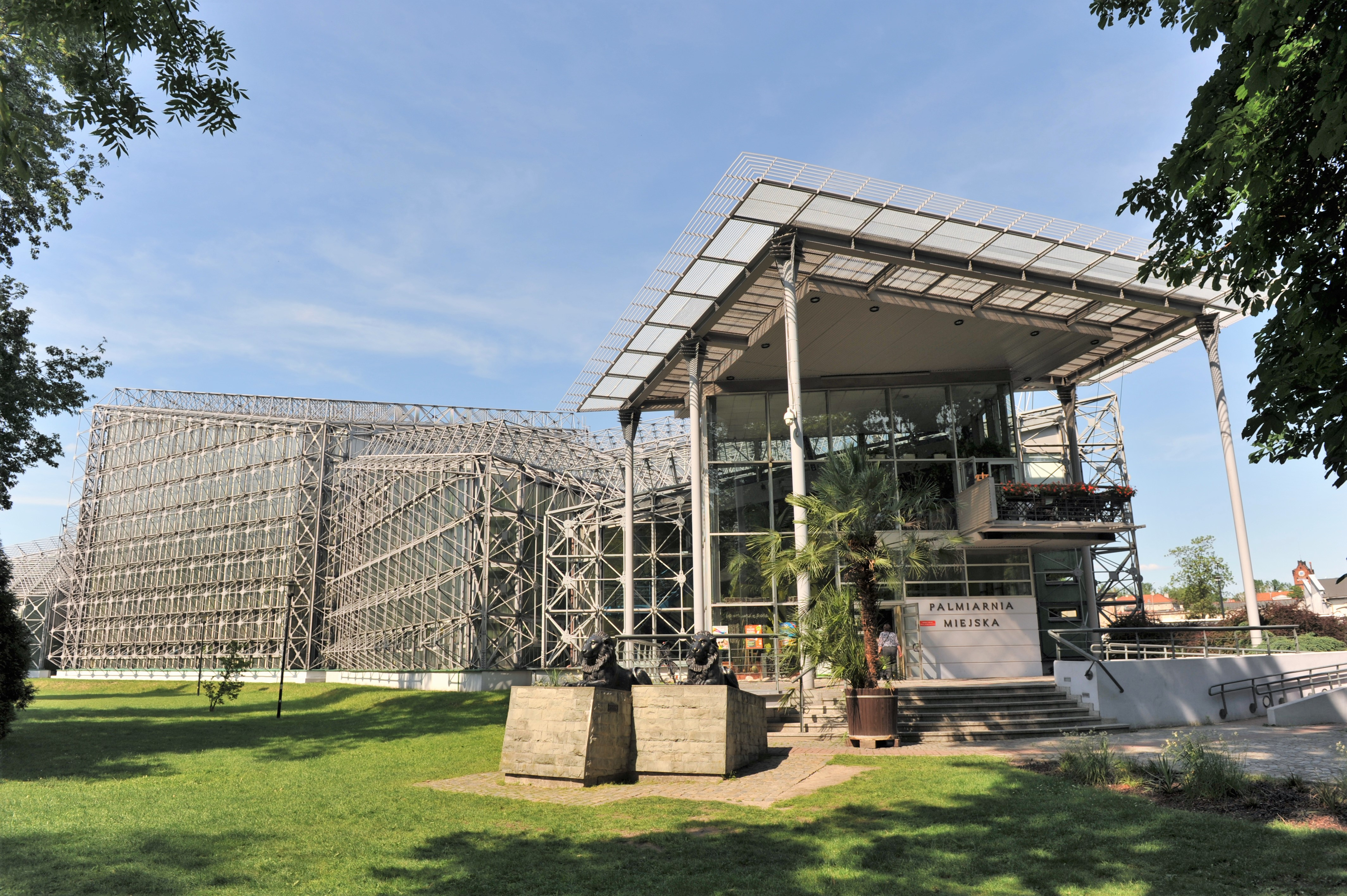
Municipal Palm House

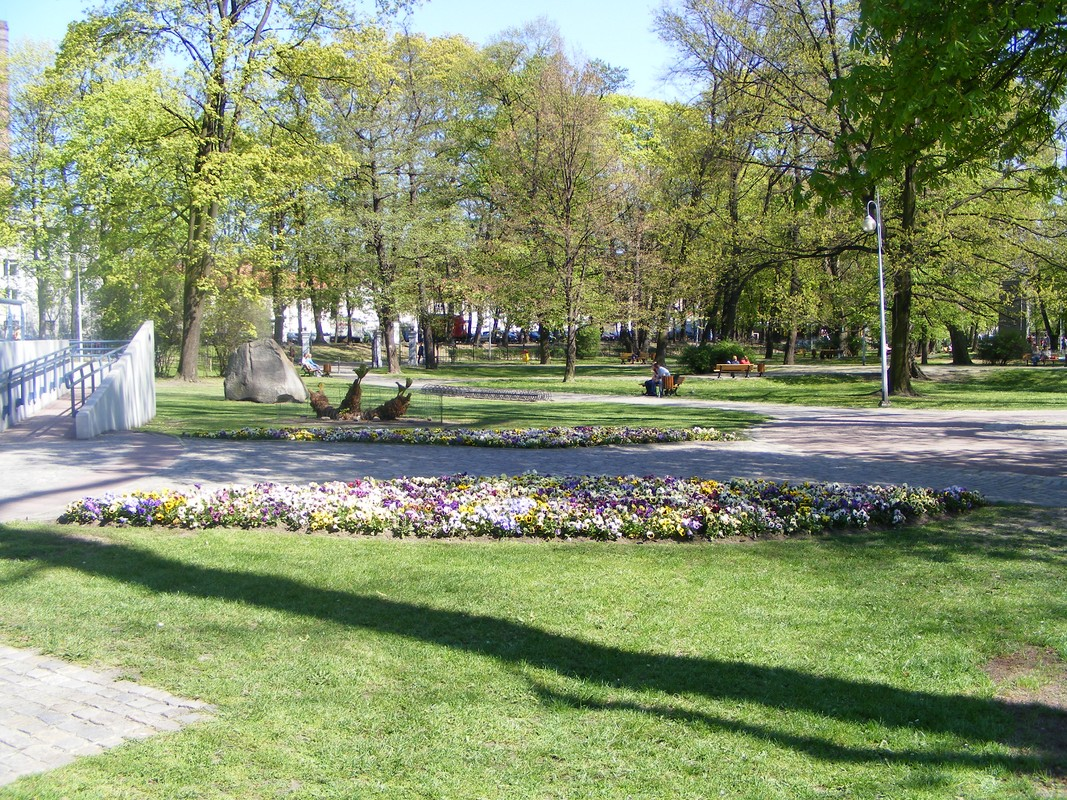
Chopin Park

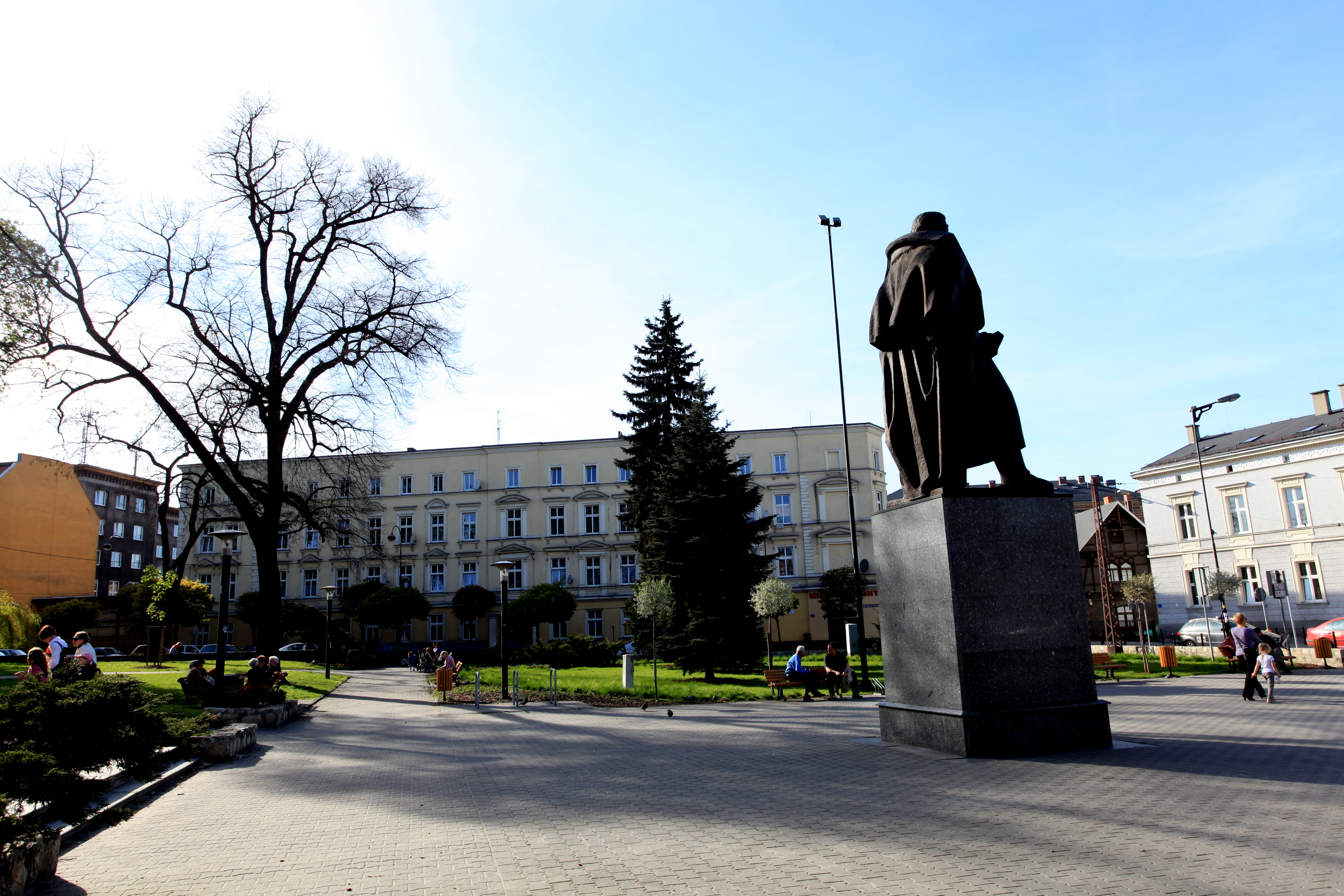
Mickiewicz Square with the Adam Mickiewicz monument

- Market Square (Rynek) with the Town Hall (Ratusz), Neptune Fountain and colourful historic townhouses, located in the Old Town
- The Gliwice Radio Tower of Radiostacja Gliwicka ("Radio Station Gliwice") in Szobiszowice is the only remaining radio tower of wood construction in the world, and with a height of 118 meters, is perhaps the tallest remaining construction made out of wood in the world. It is listed as a Historic Monument of Poland and now it is a branch of the local museum.
- Piast Castle dates back to the Middle Ages and hosts a branch of the local museum.
- Museum in Gliwice (Muzeum w Gliwicach), a local museum
  - Museum of Upper Silesian Jewry, a part of the local museum; located in the mortuary at the New Jewish Cemetery, which was designed by the Viennese Architect Max Fleischer
- Sts. Peter and Paul Cathedral, the cathedral church of the Roman Catholic Diocese of Gliwice, and other historic churches
- Medieval fortified Old Saint Bartholomew church
- Medieval town walls
- Baroque Holy Cross Church and Redemptorist monastery from the 17th century (former Reformed Franciscan monastery)
- Piłsudski Square with a monument of pre-war Polish leader Józef Piłsudski
- Chopin Park with a monument to the Polish composer Fryderyk Chopin and the Municipal Palm House
- Culture and Recreation Park in Gliwice
- Various historic public buildings, including the Main Post Office, Voivodeship Administrative Court, the district court
- Teatr Miejski (Municipal Theatre)
- Chrobry Park
- Monuments to Adam Mickiewicz and Tadeusz Kościuszko
- Gliwice Trynek narrow-gauge station is a protected monument. The narrow-gauge line to Racibórz via Rudy closed in 1991 although a short section still remains as a museum line.
- The Weichmann Textile House was built during the Summers of 1921 and 1922. It was never referred to as Weichmann Textile House from its completion in Summer 1922 until its closing in 1943. Rather it was founded under the name Seidenhaus Weichmann ("Silk House Weichmann") by a Jewish WWI veteran, Erwin Weichmann (1891–1976), who had been awarded the Iron Cross 2nd Class by Germany. Erwin Weichmann a long time friend of Erich Mendelsohn, commissioned the architect to design Seidenhaus Weichmann. Today a monument can be seen near the entrance to the bank, that now occupies the building. Seidenhaus Weichmann is a two-floor structure. The second floor was initially a bachelor's pad for Erwin Weichmann, as he did not marry until 1930. In 1936 the newly created Nuremberg Laws forced Erwin Weichmann to sell Seidenhaus Weichmann and move temporarily to Hindenberg (Zabrze) before emigrating to the United States in July 1938. The individual, who had purchased Seidenhaus Weichmann in 1936, never saw a profit, as the economic strain of WWII severely reduced the market demand for nonessentials, which included the fine imported silks of sold by Seidenhaus Weichmann. Then in 1943, the purchaser of Seidenhaus was killed in an Allied bombing raid, which marked the end of Seidenhaus Weichmann.

== Higher education and science ==
Silesian University of Technology

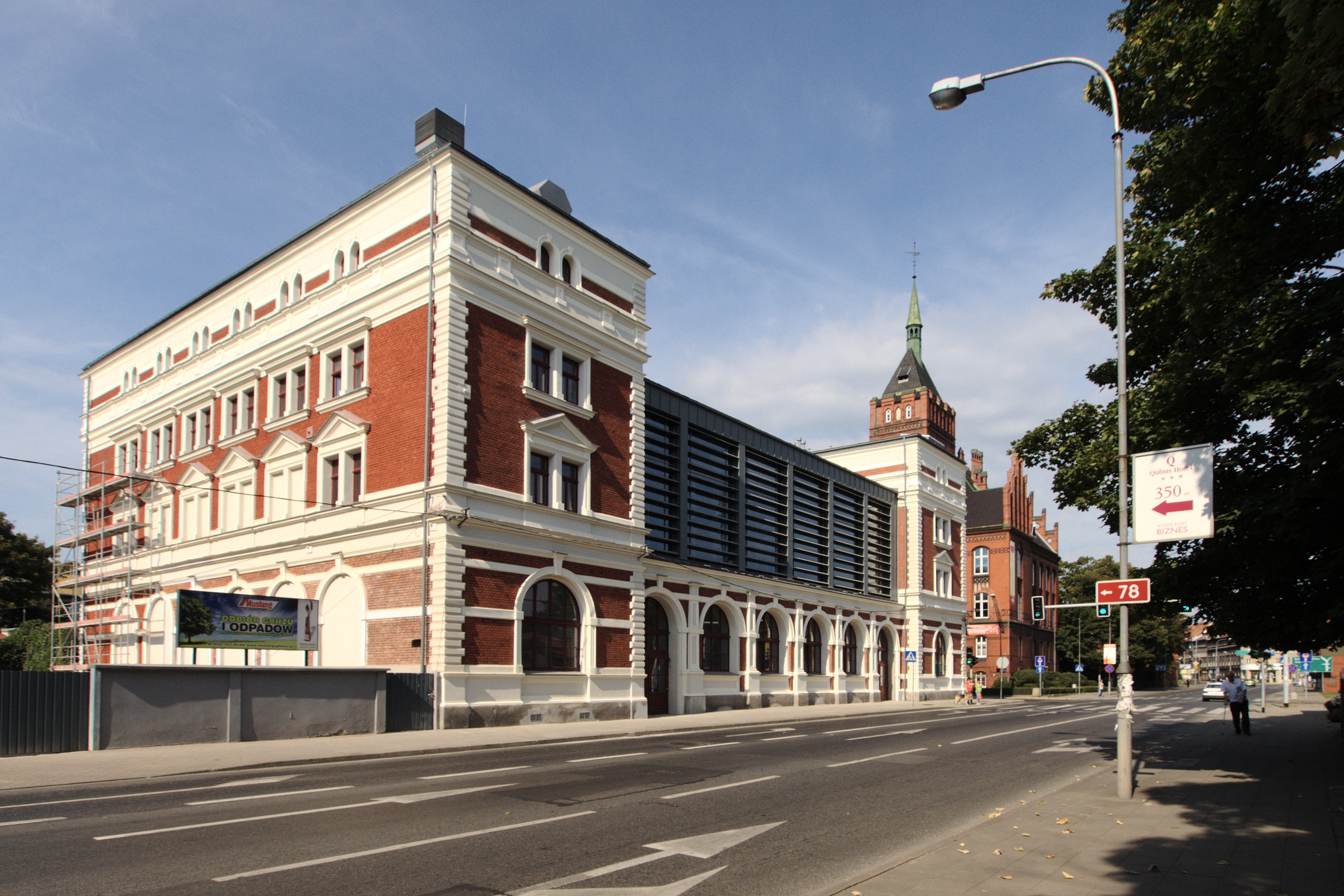
Faculty of Architecture

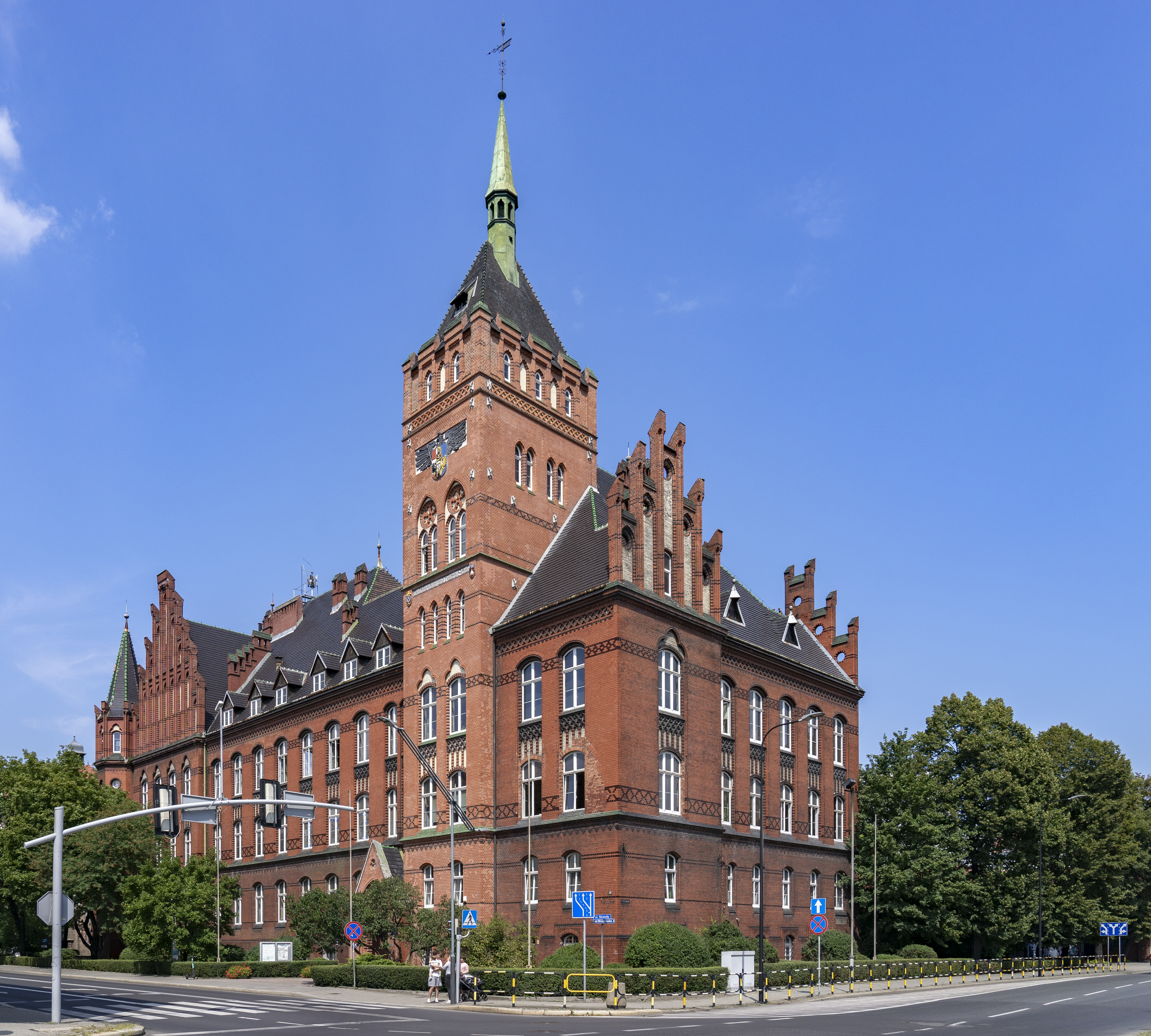
Faculty of Chemistry

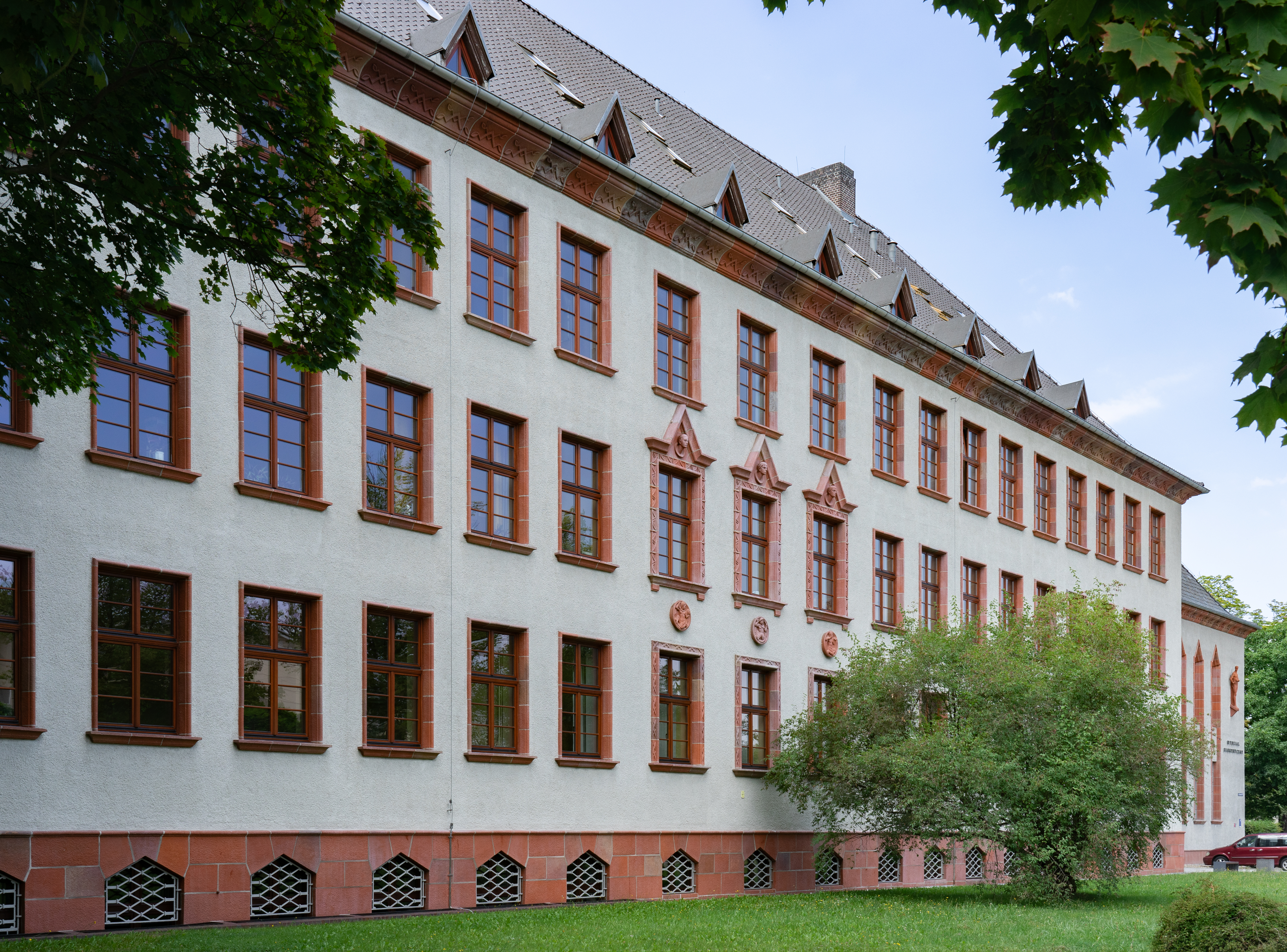
Faculty of Electrical Engineering

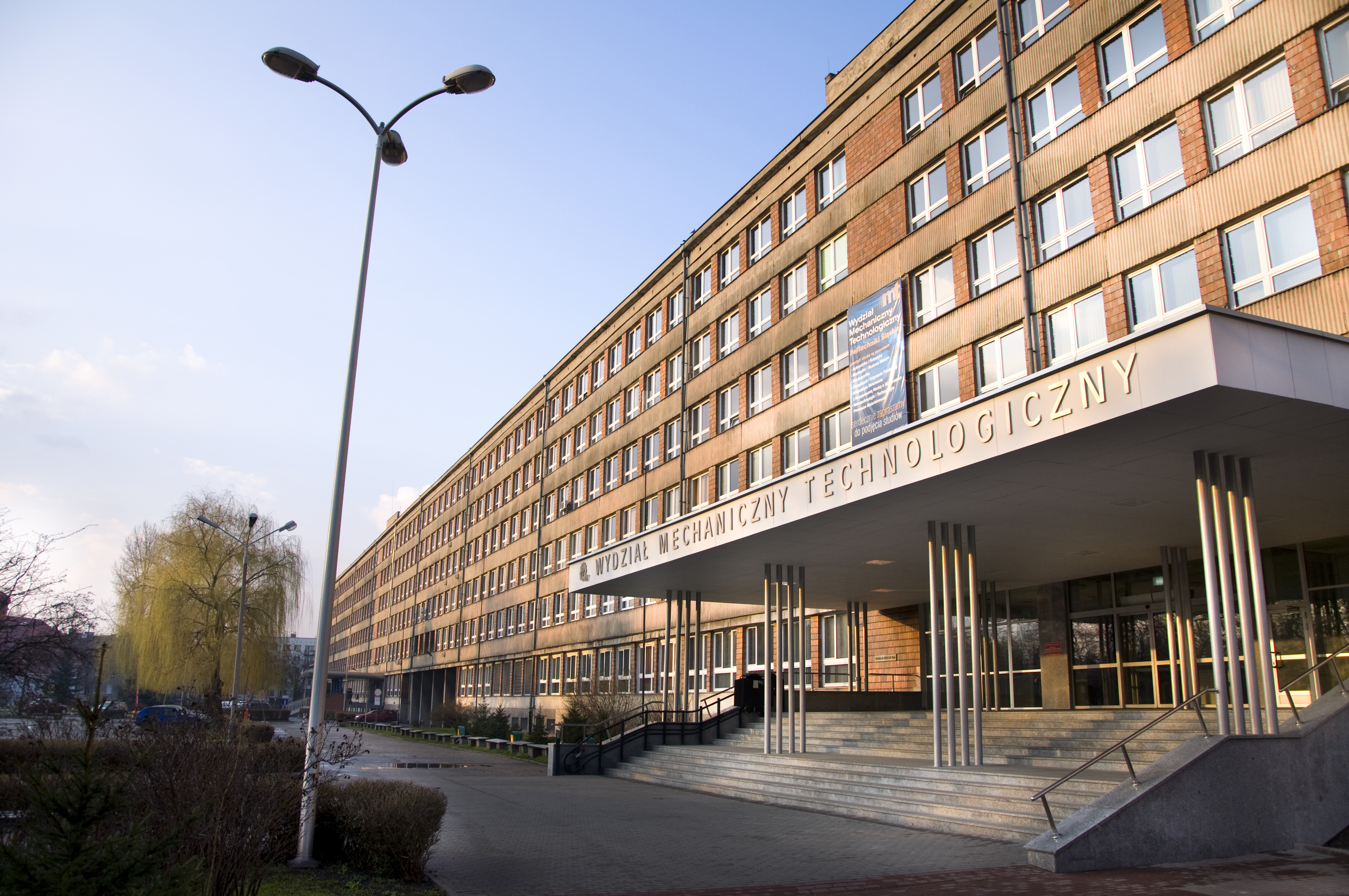
Faculty of Mechanical Engineering

Gliwice is a major applied science hub for the Metropolis GZM. Gliwice is a seat of:

- Silesian University of Technology with about 32,000 students (Politechnika Śląska)
- Akademia Polonijna of Częstochowa, branch in Gliwice
- Gliwice College of Entrepreneurship (Gliwicka Wyższa Szkoła Przedsiębiorczości)
- Polish Academy of Sciences (Polska Akademia Nauk)
  - Institute of Theoretical And Applied Informatics
  - Institute of Chemical Engineering
  - Carbochemistry branch
- WSB University, branch in Gliwice
- Other (commercial or government funded) applied research centers:
  - Oncological Research Center (Centrum Onkologii)
  - Inorganic Chemistry Research Institute (Instytut Chemii Nieorganicznej)
  - Research Institute of Refractory Materials (Instytut Materiałów Ogniotrwałych)
  - Research Institute for Non-Ferrous Metals (Instytut Metali Nieżelaznych)
  - Research Institute for Ferrous Metallurgy (Polish: Instytut Metalurgii Żelaza)
  - Welding Research Institute (Instytut Spawalnictwa)

== Transport ==
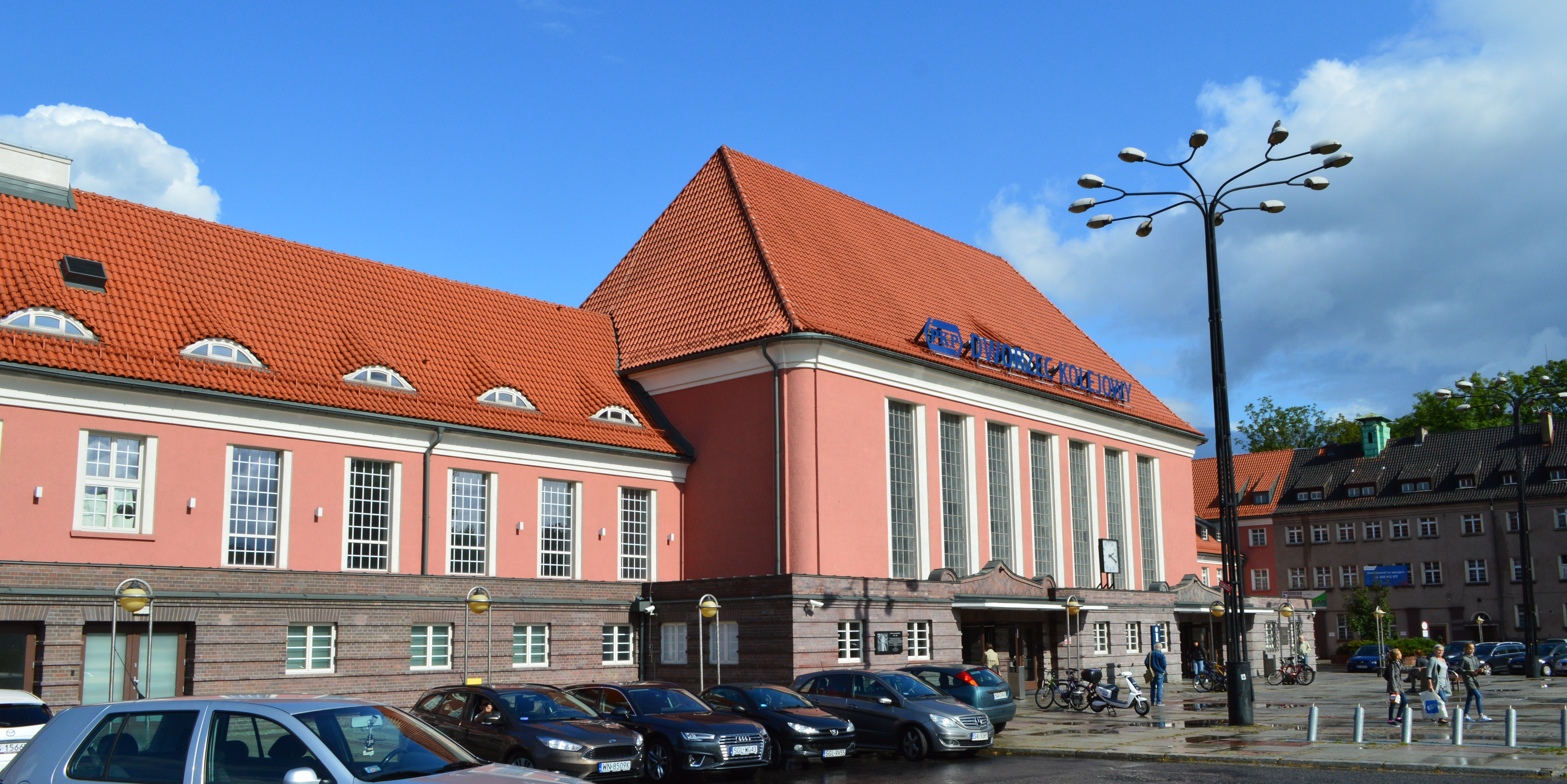
Main train station

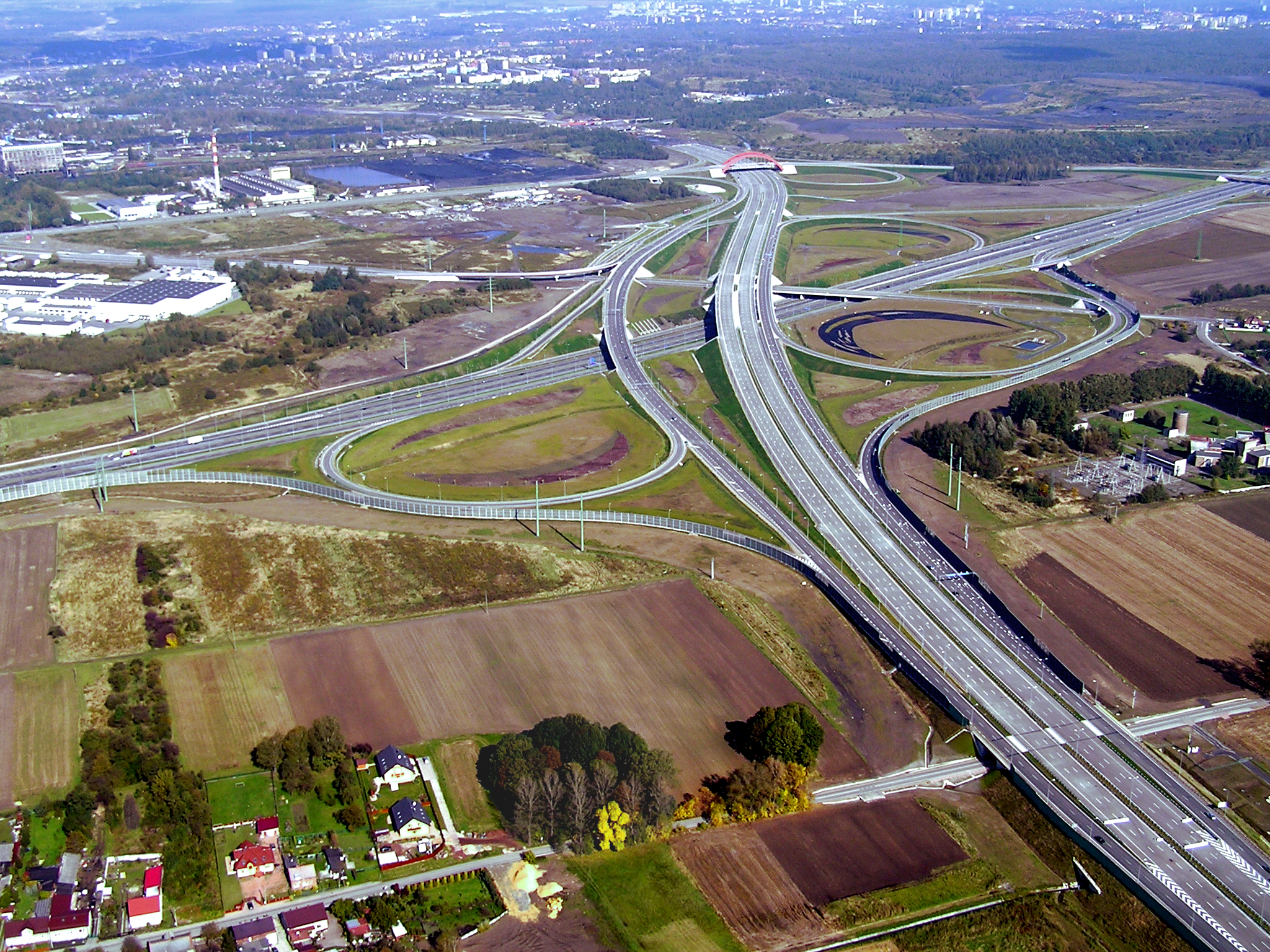
Gliwice-Sośnica interchange

The Polish north–south A1 and east–west A4 motorways, which are parts of the European routes E75 and E40, respectively, run through Gliwice, and their junction is located in the city. In addition the Polish National roads 78 and 88 also run through the city.

=== Water transport ===
The Gliwice Canal (Kanał Gliwicki) links the harbour to the Oder River and thus to the waterway network across much of Germany and to the Baltic Sea. There is also an older Kłodnica Canal (Kanał Kłodnicki) which is no longer operational.

== Sports ==
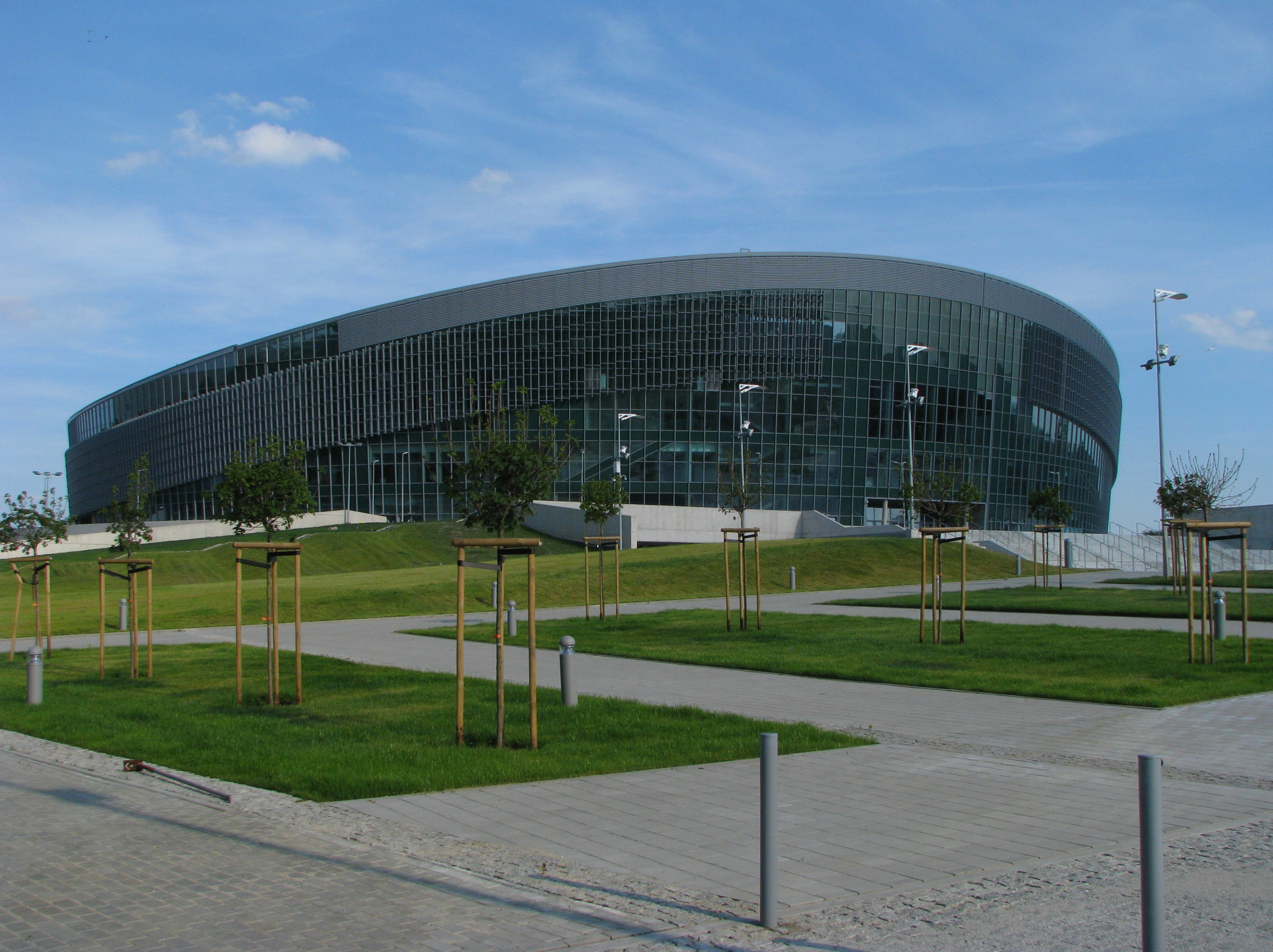
Gliwice Arena multi-purpose indoor arena with a seating capacity of 13,752

Professional sports teams
Club	Sport	League	Trophies
Piast Gliwice	Men's football	Ekstraklasa	1 Polish Championship (2019)
Piast Gliwice	Men's futsal	Ekstraklasa	1 Polish Championship (2022)
GTK Gliwice	Men's basketball	Polish Basketball League	0
Sośnica Gliwice	Women's handball	Liga Centralna Kobiet	3 Polish Championships; 3 Polish Cups

Other notable clubs:

- Gliwice Cricket Club
- K.S. Kodokan Gliwice – martial arts team and club
- Gliwice LIONS – American Football team

== Politics ==
Districts of Gliwice

The city's President (i.e. mayor) is Adam Neumann. He succeeded Zygmunt Frankiewicz who was mayor for 26 years (1993–2019) before being elected as a Polish Senator.

Gliwice has 21 city districts, each of them with its own Rada Osiedlowa. They include, in alphabetical order: Bojków, Brzezinka, Czechowice, Kopernik, Ligota Zabrska, Łabędy, Obrońców Pokoju, Ostropa, Politechnika, Sikornik, Sośnica, Stare Gliwice, Szobiszowice, Śródmieście, Żwirki I Wigury, Trynek, Wilcze Gardło, Wojska Polskiego, Wójtowa Wieś, Zatorze, Żerniki.

=== Bytom/Gliwice/Zabrze constituency ===
Members of Parliament (Sejm) elected from Bytom/Gliwice/Zabrze constituency include: Brzeziński Jacek (PO), Chłopek Aleksander (PiS), Gałażewski Andrzej (PO), Głogowski Tomasz (PO), Kaźmierczak Jan (PO), Martyniuk Wacław (LiD), Religa Zbigniew (PiS), Sekuła Mirosław (PO), Szarama Wojciech (PiS), Szumilas Krystyna (PO).

== Notable people ==
- John Baildon (1772–1846), Scottish engineer
- Helmut Bartuschek (1905–1984), translator and poet
- Halina Bendkowski (born 1949), German author and journalist
- Horst Bienek (1930–1990), German author of novels about Upper Silesia
- William Blandowski (1822–1878), German explorer, zoologist, photographer
- Sebastian Boenisch (born 1987), Polish-German footballer who plays for the Poland national football team
- Lothar Bolz (1903–1986), German politician, foreign affairs minister of the communist German Democratic Republic
- Agata Buzek (born 1976), Polish actress, daughter of Jerzy Buzek
- Jerzy Buzek (born 1940), professor of chemistry, Prime Minister of Poland 1997–2001, MEP since 2004 and president of European Parliament since 2009
- Ernst Degner (1931–1983), German Grand Prix motorcycle racer and designer
- Robert Dziekański (?-2007), Polish immigrant to Canada who was tasered 5 times and killed by the Royal Canadian Mounted Police at Vancouver International Airport
- Gottfried Bermann Fischer (1897–1995), German publisher
- Christian Ganczarski (born 1966), German citizen of Polish descent, convert to Islam and convicted terrorist
- Eugen Goldstein (1850–1930), German physicist
- Sophia Grojsman (Khodosh) (born 1945), internationally famous American perfumer
- Hans Hanke (1912–1981), German military officer (World War Two)
- Rudolf Herrnstadt (1903–1966), German journalist
- Adalbert Kelm (1856–1939), architect, important for the enlargement of the town in the 1890s. Famous for the Naval Academy Mürwik in Flensburg-Mürwik.
- Wojciech Kocyan, Polish pianist
- Włodzimierz Lubański (born 1947), Polish football player
- Adam Matuszczyk (born 1989), Polish football player
- Zbigniew Messner (1929–2014), professor and former rector of Economic Academy in Katowice, deputy prime minister of People's Republic of Poland 1983–1985, prime minister 1985–1988
- Gustav Neumann (1838–1881), German chess player
- Lukas Podolski (born 1985), Polish-German football player
- Wojciech Pszoniak (1942–2020), Polish film and theatre actor
- Tadeusz Różewicz (1921–2014), Polish poet and writer
- Zofia Rydet (1911–1997), Polish photographer
- Stanisław Sojka (born 1959), Polish musician
- Oskar Troplowitz (1863–1918), German pharmacist and owner of Beiersdorf AG, inventor of Nivea and other products
- Richard Wetz (1875–1935), German composer
- Erich Peter Wohlfarth (1924–1988), German physicist
- Leo Yankevich (1961–2018), American poet and translator
- Adam Zagajewski (1945–2021), Polish poet
- Krystian Zimerman (born 1956), Polish pianist and conductor

== International relations ==
=== Consulates ===
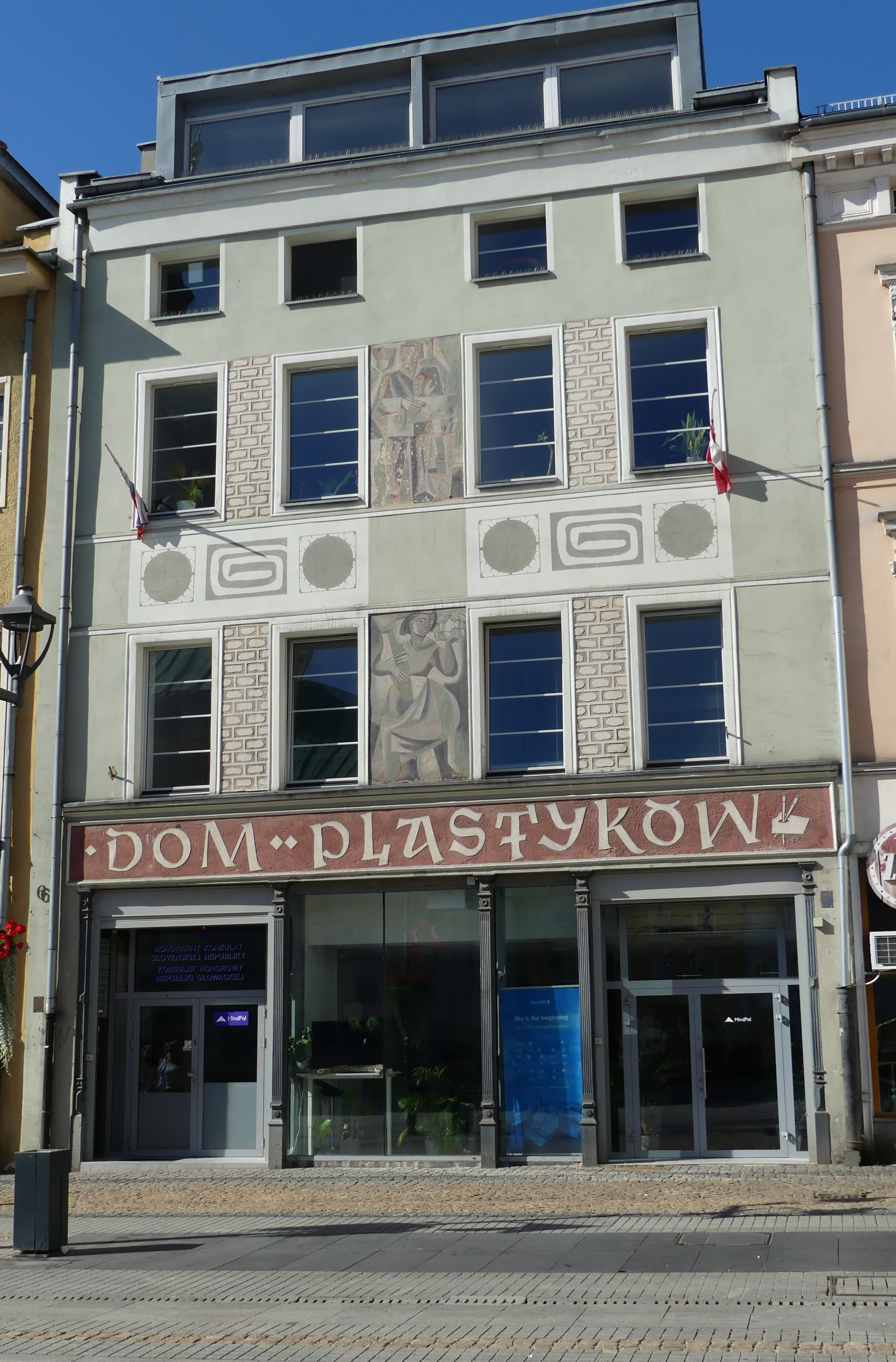
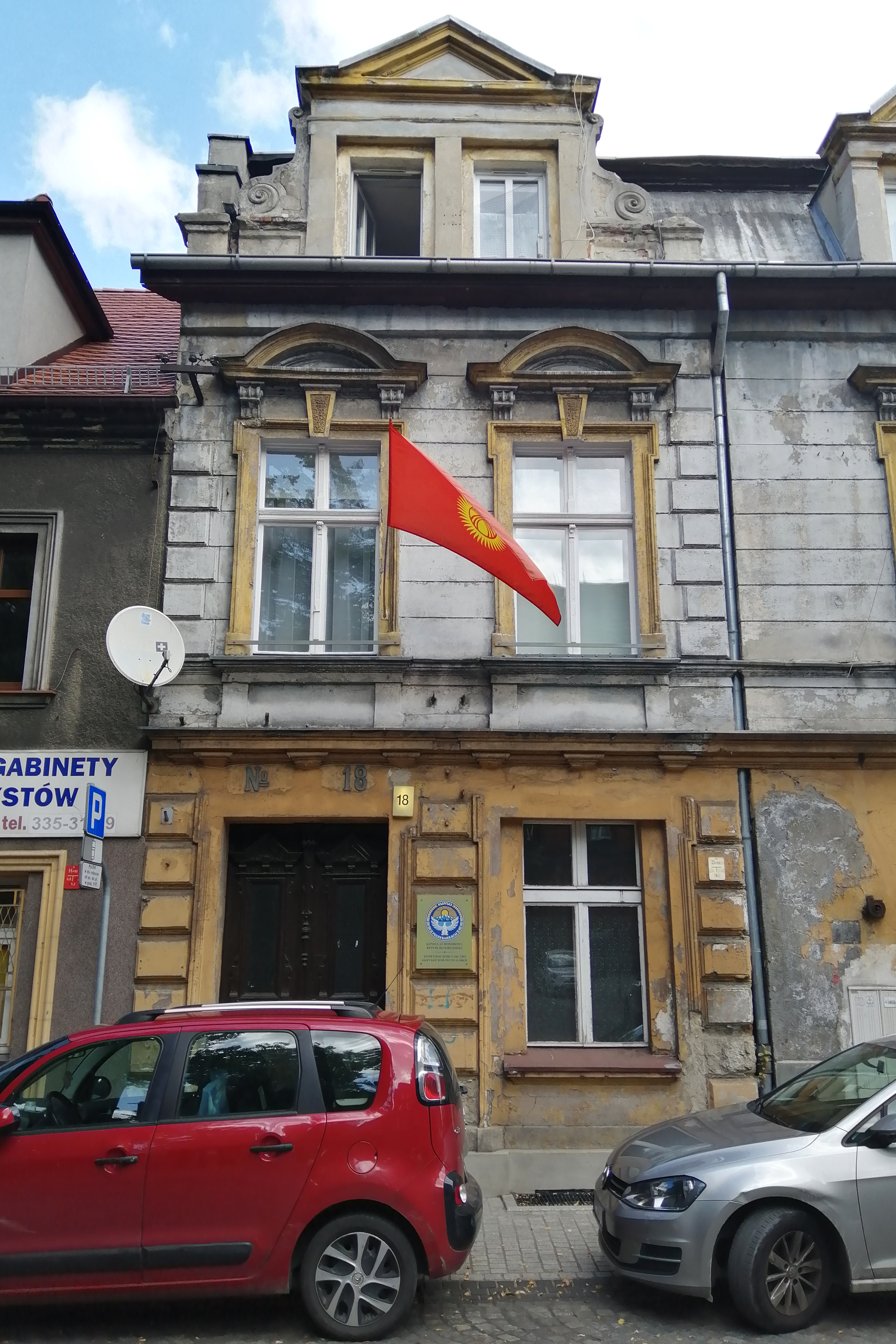
Honorary consulates of Slovakia and Kyrgyzstan

There are honorary consulates of Germany, Kyrgyzstan and Slovakia in Gliwice.

=== Twin towns – sister cities ===
Gliwice is twinned with:

- Bottrop, Germany
- Dessau-Roßlau, Germany
- Doncaster, England, United Kingdom (where there is a street called Gliwice Way)
- Kežmarok, Slovakia
- Nacka, Sweden
- Salgótarján, Hungary
- Valenciennes, France (where there is a Rue de Gliwice)

== See also ==
- Gliwice County
- Gliwice incident

== Sources ==
- Cygański, Mirosław (1984). "Hitlerowskie prześladowania przywódców i aktywu Związków Polaków w Niemczech w latach 1939 – 1945". Przegląd Zachodni (in Polish) (4).
- Rosenbaum, Sebastian; Węcki, Mirosław (2010). Nadzorować, interweniować, karać. Nazistowski obóz władzy wobec Kościoła katolickiego w Zabrzu (1934–1944). Wybór dokumentów (in Polish). Katowice: IPN. ISBN 978-83-8098-299-4.
