= New Synagogue (Gliwice) =

Former Reform synagogue in Gleiwitz, Germany, now Gliwice, Poland

New Synagogue Gleiwitz (Gliwice)
- German: Neue Synagoge Gleiwitz; Polish: Nowa Synagoga w Gliwicach
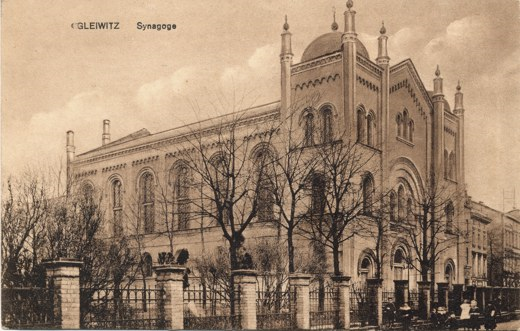
- The former synagoge in the 19th century

- Location of the former synagogue in Germany, as it was in 1937

Religion
- Affiliation: Reform Judaism (former)
- Rite: Nusach Ashkenaz
- Ecclesiastical or organizational status: Synagogue (1861–1938)
- Status: Destroyed

Location
- Location: Gleiwitz (now 15 Dolne Wały Street, Gliwice)
- Country: Germany (now Poland)
- Interactive map of New Synagogue; Gleiwitz (Gliwice)
- Coordinates: 50°17′44″N 18°40′00″E

Architecture
- Architects: Salomon Lubowski; Louis Troplowitz
- Type: Synagogue architecture
- Style: Rundbogenstil; Moorish Revival; Romanesque Revival
- Completed: 1861
- Destroyed: November 1938 (during Kristallnacht
- Materials: Brick

The New Synagogue (German: Neue Synagoge Gleiwitz; Polish: Nowa Synagoga w Gliwicach) was a former Reform Jewish congregation and synagogue, located in Gleiwitz, Germany (today, 15 Dolne Wały Street, in Gliwice, Poland).

Designed by Salomon Lubowski and Louis Troplowitz in the Rundbogenstil, Moorish Revival, and Romanesque Revival styles and completed in 1861, the synagogue was destroyed by Nazis on November 9, 1938, during Kristallnacht.

== See also ==
- History of the Jews in Germany
- History of the Jews in Poland
- List of synagogues in Germany (in German)
- List of synagogues in Poland
