= Timeline of events preceding World War II =

This timeline of events preceding World War II covers the events (mostly during the interwar period [1918–1939] after World War I) that affected or led to World War II.

Leaders of major participating countries

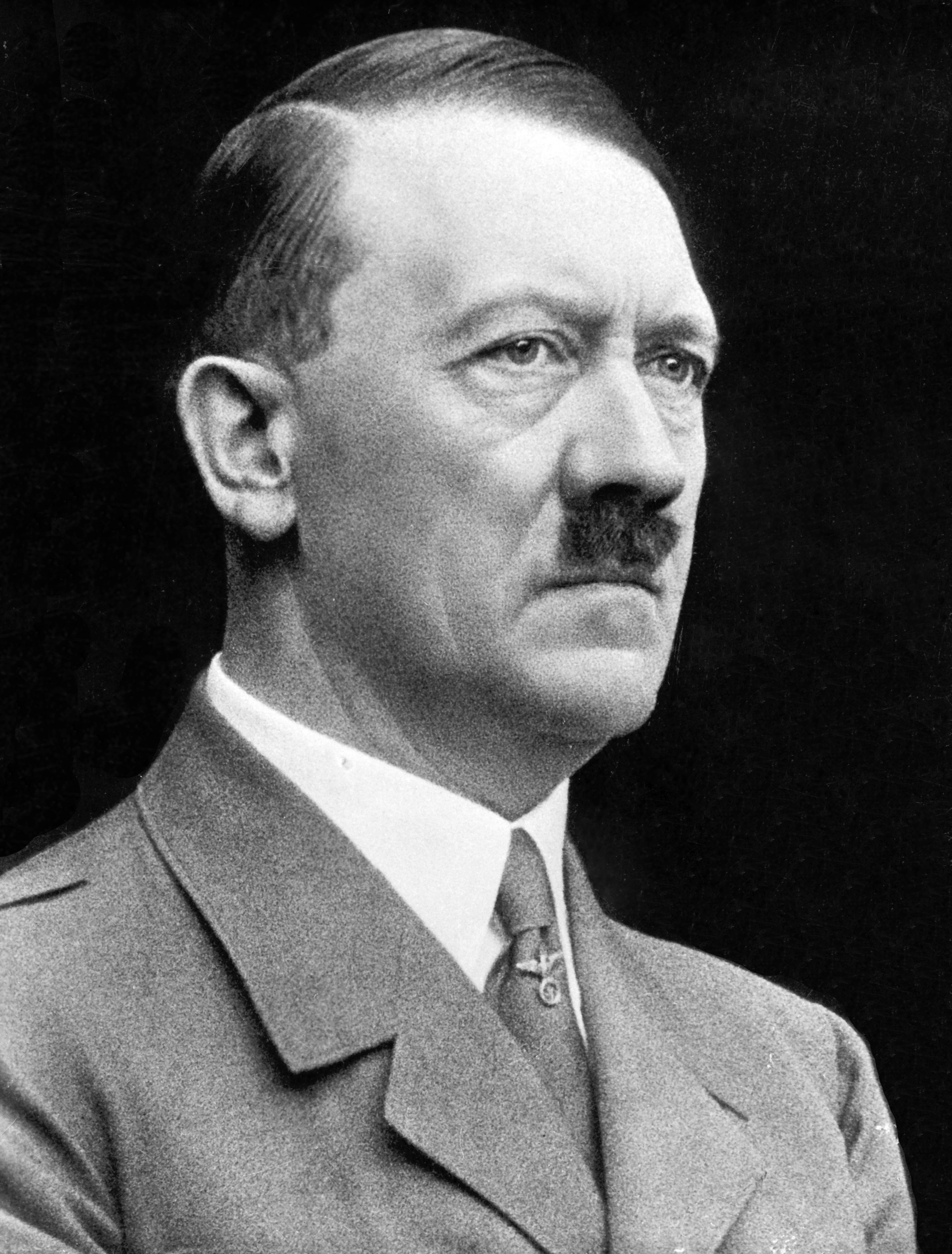
Führer Adolf Hitler
Germany
1933–1945

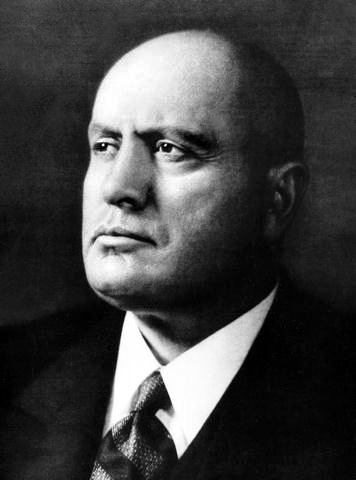
Duce Benito Mussolini
Italy
1922–1943

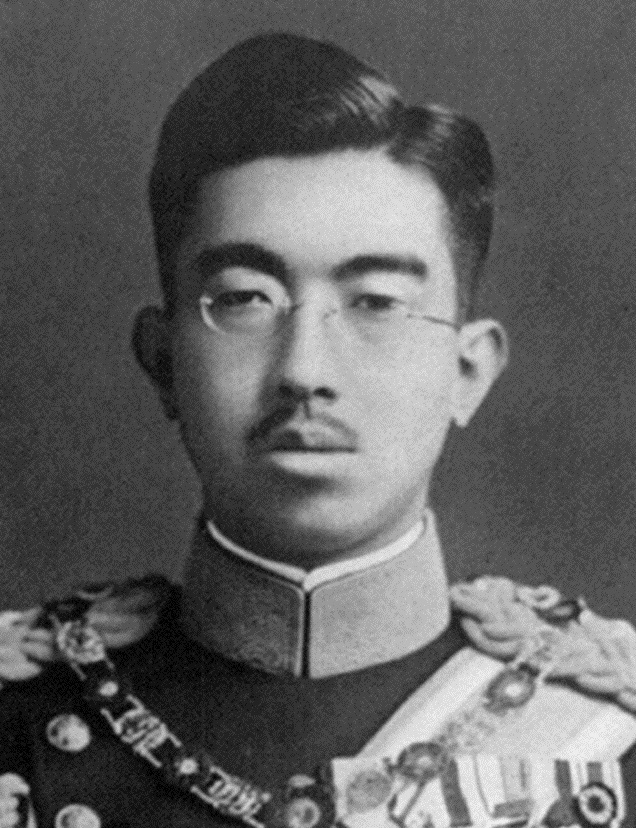
Emperor Hirohito
Japan
1926–1989

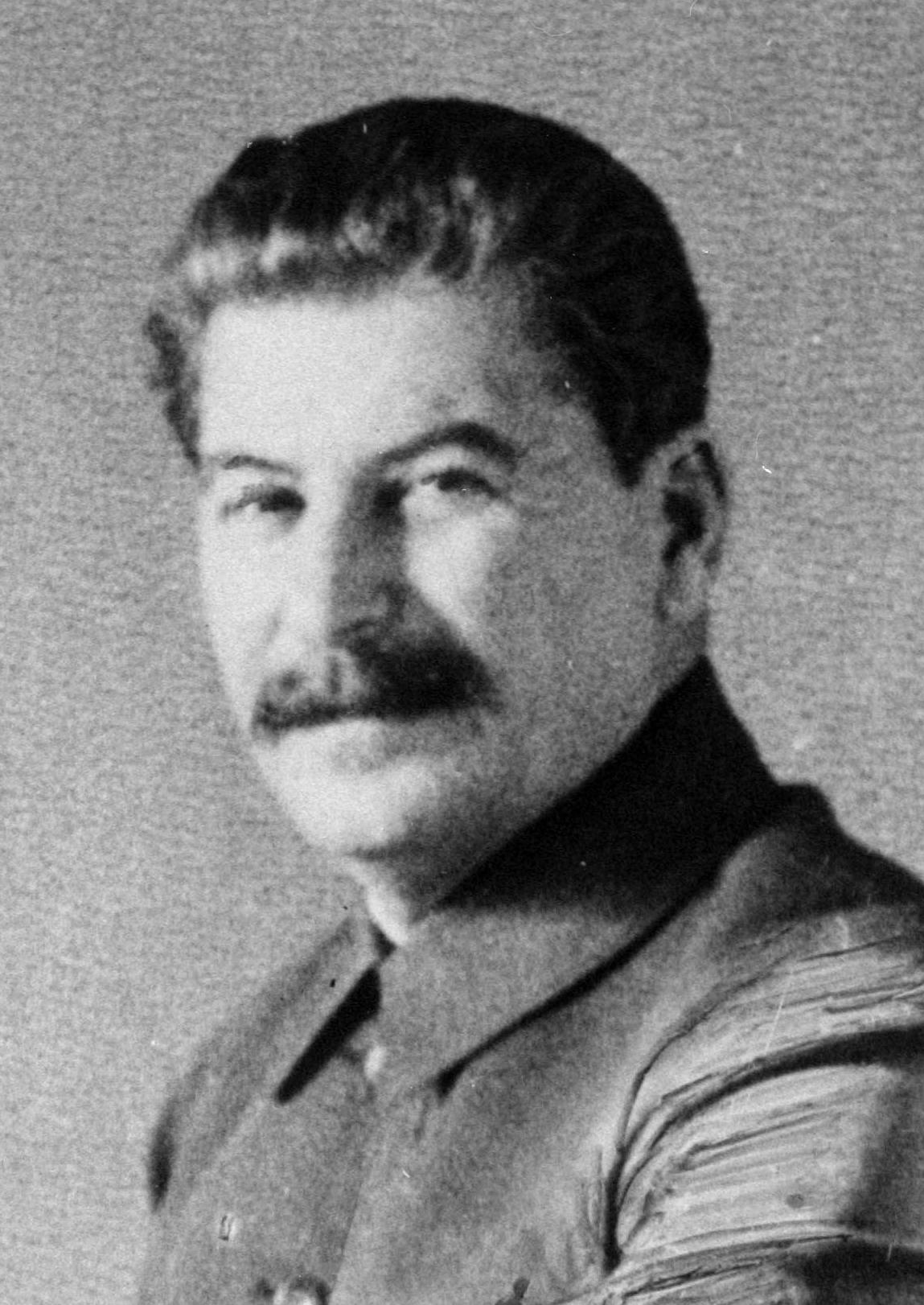
Chairman Joseph Stalin
Soviet Union
1924–1953

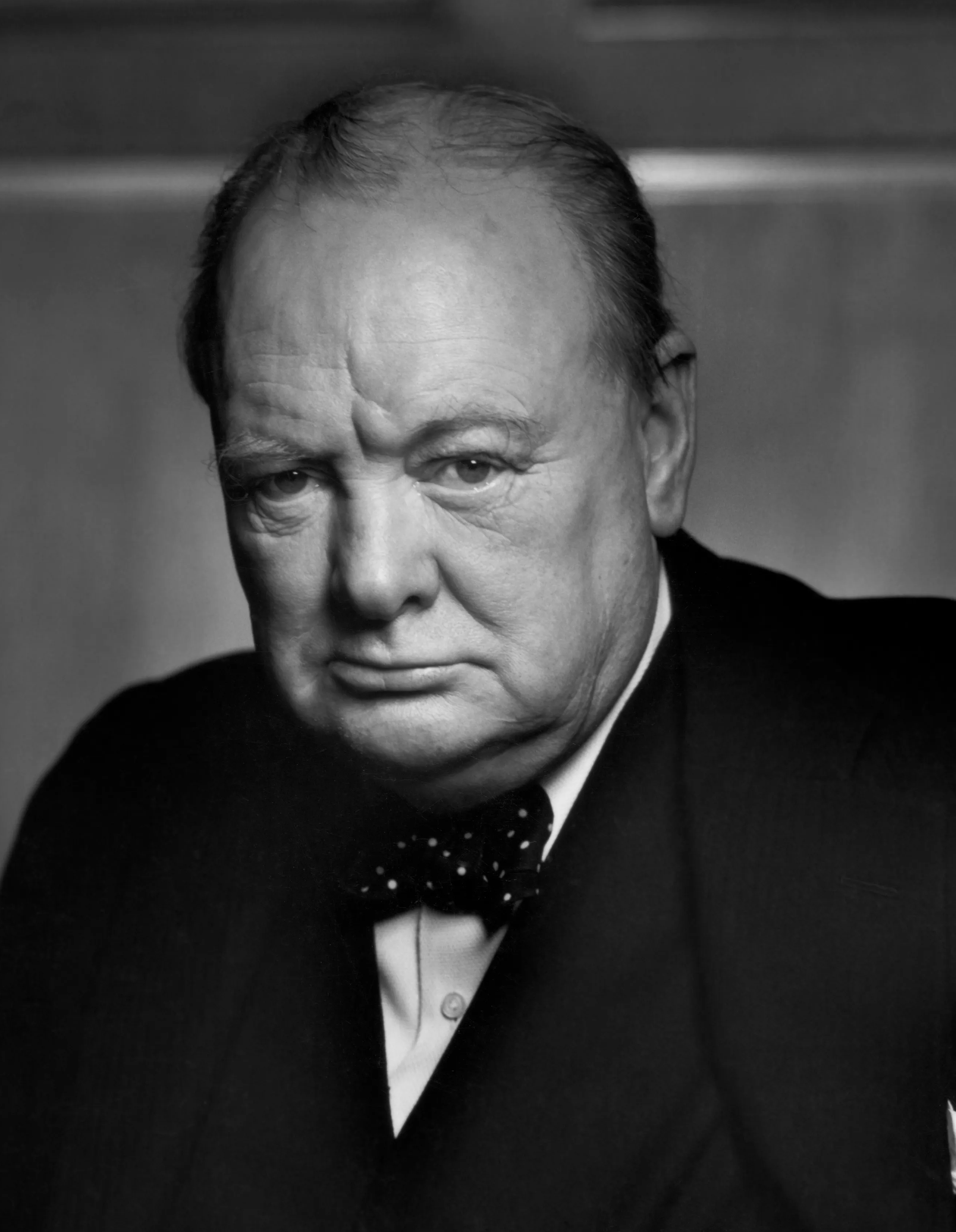
Prime Minister Winston Churchill
United Kingdom
1940–1945

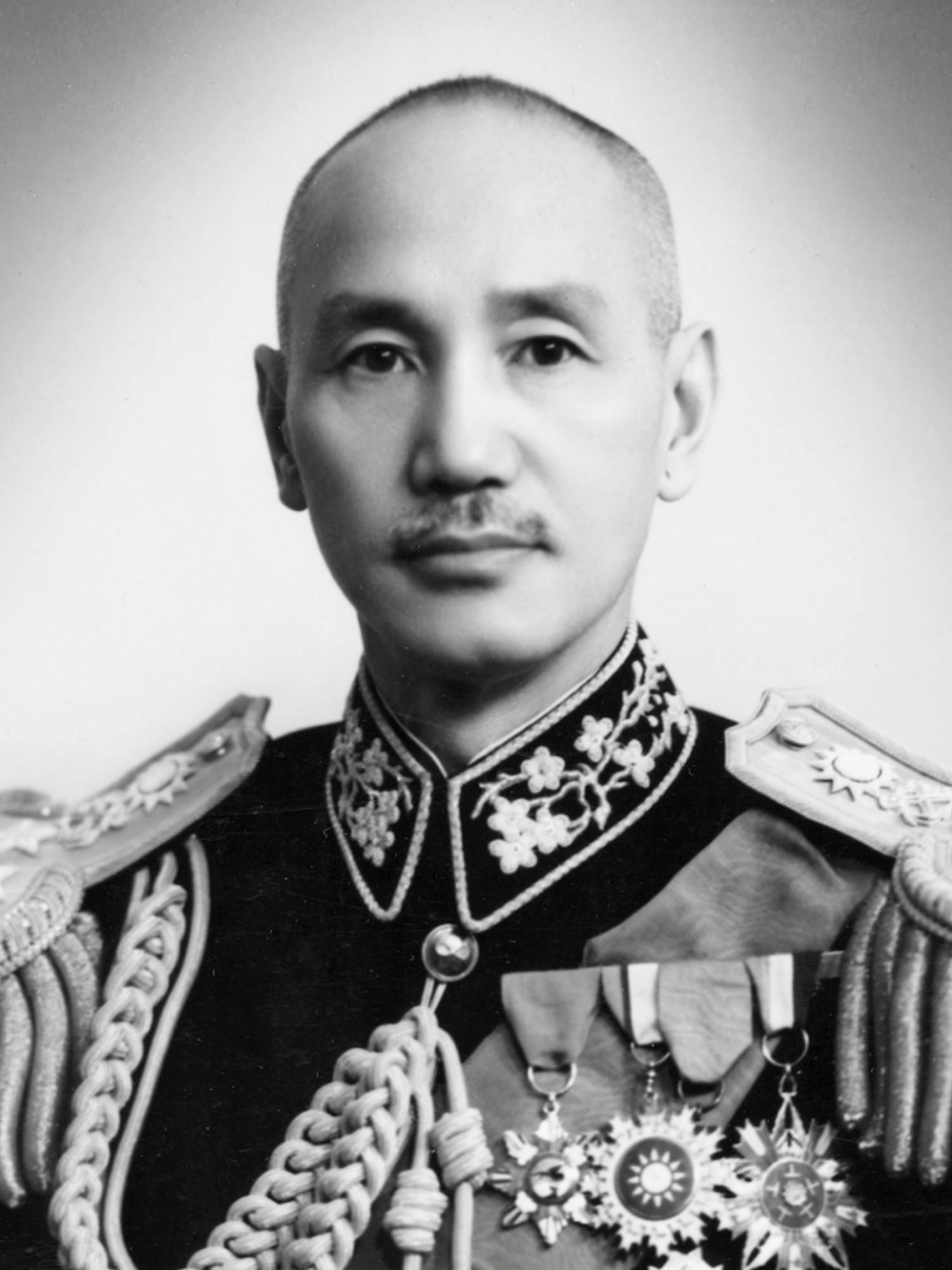
Generalissimo Chiang Kai-shek
China
1928–1975

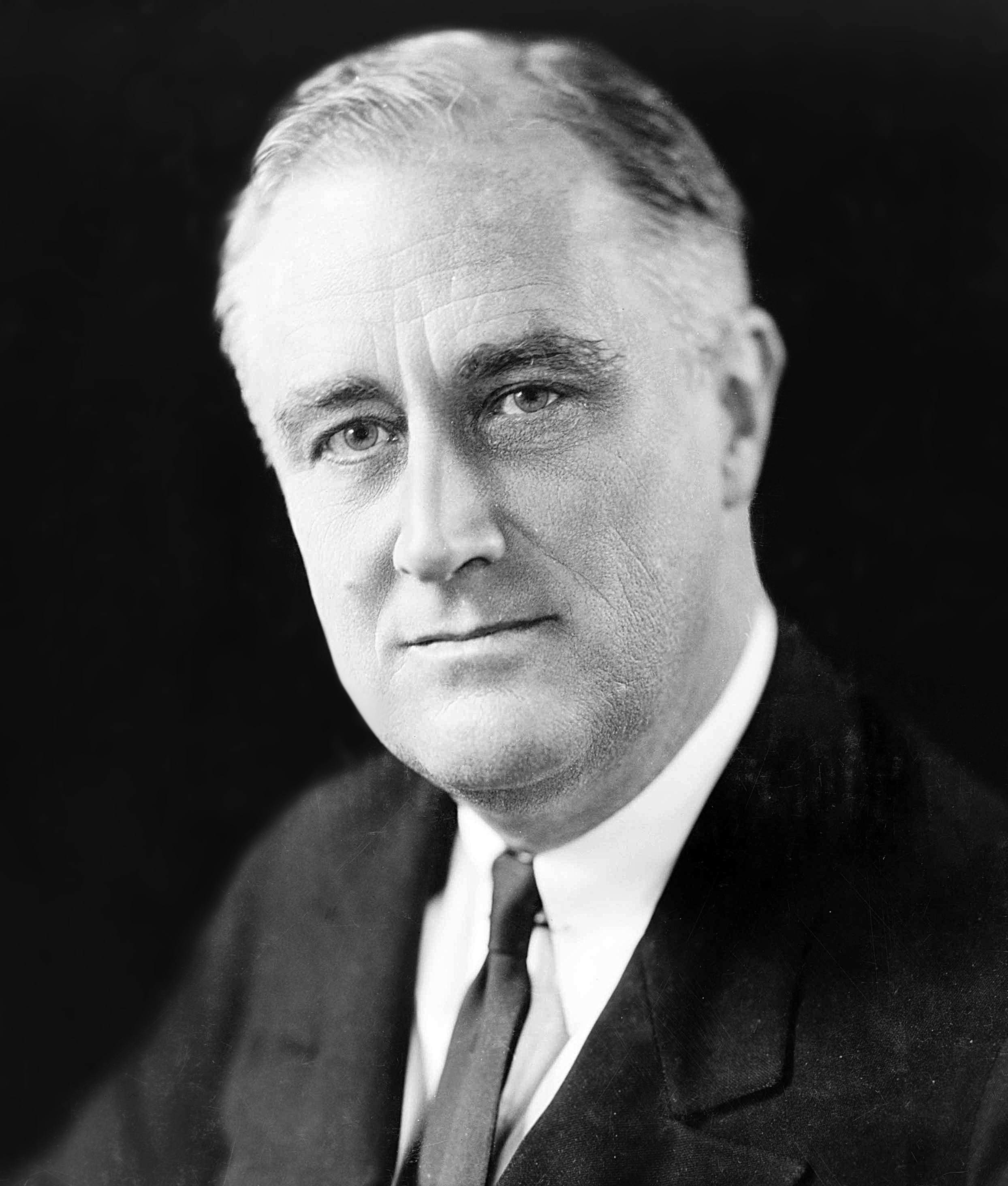
President Franklin D. Roosevelt
United States
1933–1945

== 1895 ==
- October 8: Japanese agents assassinate Queen Min of Korea, removing a major obstacle to Japan's eventual conquest of Korea in the 1900s, ultimately facilitating Japan's invasion of Manchuria in 1931.

== 1905 ==
- September 5: The Treaty of Portsmouth formally ends the Russo-Japanese War, and concedes the Empire of Japan extraterritorial rights over the South Manchuria Railway Zone.

== 1910 ==
- August 22–29: Japan annexes Korea, further paving the way for the invasion of Manchuria in 1931.

== 1917 ==
- March 12 to November 7 [O.S. February 27 and October 25]: After years of strain brought about by war and food shortages, strikes broke out in the Russian capital of Saint Petersburg, while garrison troops refused to suppress the demonstrations. Facing the loss of support from the army and political elites, Tsar Nicholas II abdicated in March 1917, bringing an end to imperial rule in Russia. A Provisional Government was established, while authority was contested by the Petrograd Soviet in a period known as dual power.
- In November 1917 (October in the Julian calendar), members of the Bolshevik Party led by Vladimir Lenin seized power in Saint Petersburg, overthrowing the Provisional Government after its defenses collapsed with minimal resistance. The Bolshevik takeover marked the beginning of a broader struggle for control of the country, eventually leading to the Russian Civil War.

== 1918 ==
- October 28–31: The Aster Revolution occurs establishing the First Hungarian Republic.
- October 28: The German Revolution begins. It is sparked after the Imperial German Navy orders to send the High Seas Fleet to confront the British navy in a last stand attempt. Despite being planned that the mission would only be revealed when at sea, a rumor spreads that a combat mission is approaching and the sailors end up starting a mutiny as they feel it is a suicidal move. This mutiny ends up spreading to ports throughout the country.
- November 11: The Armistice with Germany marks the end of World War I. German troops are given 72 hours to evacuate occupied territories and Allied troops subsequently move in and occupy the German Rhineland.
- November 13: The Hungarian–Romanian War begins.
- December 27: Start of the Greater Poland Uprising against German rule.

== 1919 ==
- January 4–15: The Spartacist uprising takes place and is crushed by the German government.
- January 18: Opening of the Paris Peace Conference to negotiate peace treaties between the belligerents of World War I.
- January 31: Battle of George Square takes place in Glasgow: the British Army is called in by the city authorities to quell a riot during a strike for a 40 hour work week.

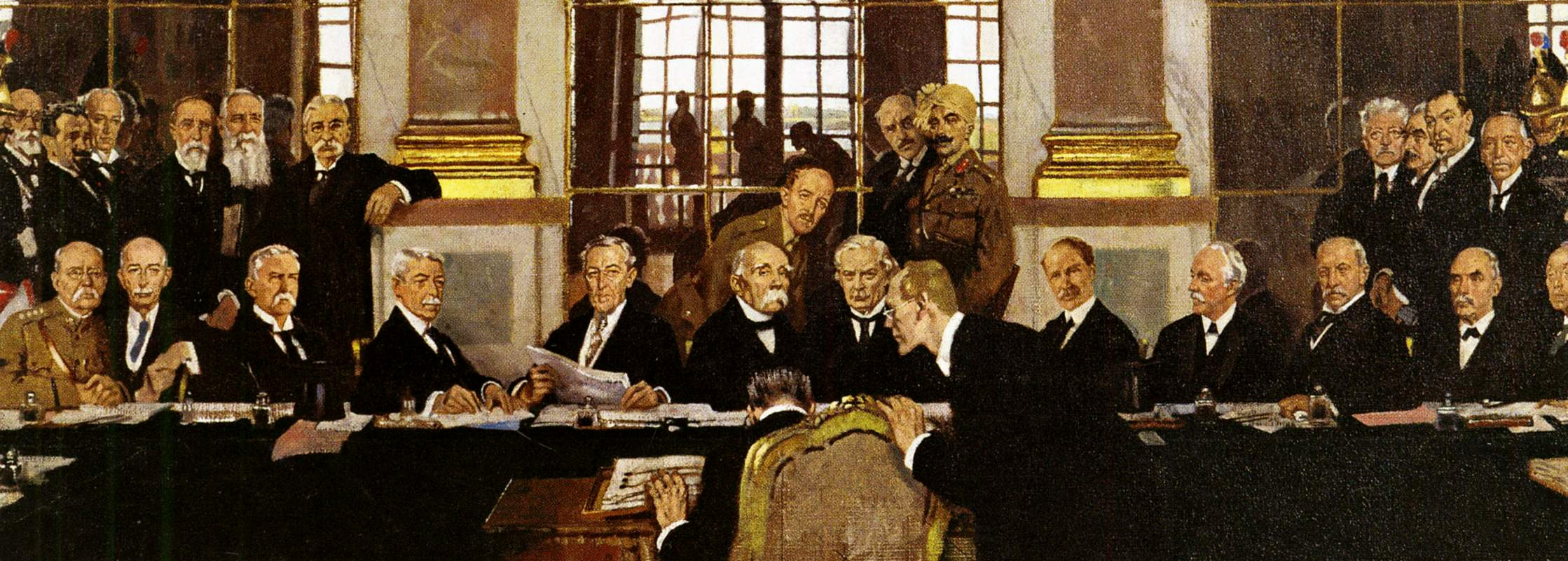
Detail from William Orpen's painting The Signing of Peace in the Hall of Mirrors, Versailles, 28th June 1919, showing the signing of the peace treaty by the German Minister of Transport Dr Johannes Bell, opposite to the representatives of the winning powers.

- February: The Polish–Soviet War begins with border clashes between the two states.
- February 13: Japan issues the Racial Equality Proposal during the Paris Peace Conference. The proposal would abolish racial discrimination but it founders on opposition from the United States, Australia and New Zealand.
- March 2: Foundation of the Third International, or Comintern, in Moscow. Comintern's stated aim is to create a global Soviet republic.
- March 12: The Austrian Constituent National Assembly demands Austria's integration to Germany.
- March 21: Proclamation of the communist Hungarian Soviet Republic.
- May 15: The Turkish War of Independence begins as Greek troops land in Smyrna.
- June 21: A majority of the German fleet is scuttled at Scapa Flow in Scotland. The ships had been interned there under the terms of the 1918 Armistice while negotiations were occurring over the ships fate. The Germans feared that either the British would seize the ships or Germany would reject the Versailles Treaty and resume the war effort altogether with the ships likely being used against Germany in this case.
- June 28: Germany and the Allied powers sign the Treaty of Versailles after six months of negotiations. The German armed forces are limited in size to 100,000 personnel and Germany is ordered to pay large reparations for war damages. Germany's ships and submarines are confiscated, its territories in Oceania and China are stripped away, and Germany's army is banned from any planes, zeppelins, tanks, submarines, or large ships. The United States signed the treaty but did not ratify it, later making a separate peace treaty with Germany.
- July: An unknown corporal named Adolf Hitler infiltrates the German Workers' Party (the precursor of the Nazi Party) at the behest of the German Reichswehr.
- August 1: Fall of the short-lived Hungarian Soviet Republic. The Hungarian People's Republic is reestablished.
- August 3: The Hungarian–Romanian War ends.
- August 8: The Hungarian People's Republic is dissolved.
- September 10: German-Austria signs the Treaty of Saint-Germain. The peace treaty with the Allies regulates the borders of Austria, forbids union with Germany, and requires German-Austria to change its name to Austria. The United States did not ratify the treaty and later makes a separate peace treaty with Austria.
- September 12: Gabriele D'Annunzio leads a force of Italian nationalist irregulars in the seizure of the disputed city of Fiume (Rijeka).
- November 27: Bulgaria signs the Treaty of Neuilly-sur-Seine. The peace treaty gives Thrace back to Greece which was gained by them through the First Balkan War during 1913, while the Bulgarian army is reduced to 20,000 men and Bulgaria is ordered to pay war reparations.

== 1920 ==
- January 21: The Paris Peace Conference comes to an end with the inaugural General Assembly of the League of Nations. Although one of the victors of World War I, the United States never joins the League.
- February 24: The National Socialist German Workers' Party (better known as the Nazi Party) is founded in Munich.

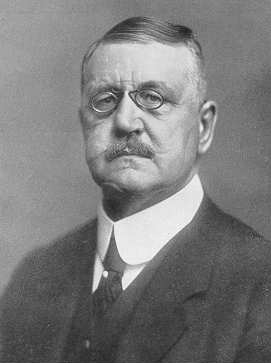
Wolfgang Kapp, the leader of the Putsch

- March: The failed right-wing Kapp Putsch takes place against the German government. The German military remains passive and the putsch is defeated by a general strike.
- The German Ruhr Uprising, spurred by the general strike against the Kapp Putsch, is crushed by the German military.
- June 4: Hungary signs the Treaty of Trianon with the Allied powers. The treaty regulated the status of an independent Hungarian state and defined its borders. The United States did not ratify the treaty and later makes a separate peace treaty with Hungary.

A map showing the partition of the Ottoman Empire as a result of the Treaty of Sèvres.

- August 10: The Ottoman Empire signs the Treaty of Sèvres with the Allied powers (except the US, which never declared war on Turkey). The treaty partitions the Ottoman Empire and the Turkish armed forces are reduced in size. Greece did not accept the borders as drawn up in the treaty and did not sign it. The Treaty of Sèvres was annulled in the course of the Turkish War of Independence and the parties signed and ratified the superseding Treaty of Lausanne in 1923.
- October: Żeligowski's Mutiny, a Polish force led by General Lucjan Żeligowski, capture Vilnius, officially without support from the Polish state.
- November 2: Franklin D. Roosevelt is defeated for the office of Vice President of the United States by Massachusetts Governor Calvin Coolidge.
- November 15: The Free City of Danzig is established in accordance with the Treaty of Versailles, as a contentious compromise between the generally nationalist German majority in the city, and Poland's right to free and secure access to the sea.
- December 24: Bloody Christmas: Italy occupies Fiume after five days of resistance from Gabriele D'Annunzio's legionnaires.

== 1921 ==
- Spring: Start of the Russian famine of 1921–1922 due to the combined effects of economic disturbance from the Russian Revolution, the Russian Civil War, and the government policy of war communism.
- March 7–17: Red Army mutineers and Russian civilians seize the strategic city of Kronstadt in the Kronstadt rebellion, demanding expanded civilian rights and an end to the Bolshevik monopoly on Soviet politics. After several days and several thousand casualties, the rebellion is crushed by Bolshevik forces from neighboring Petrograd.

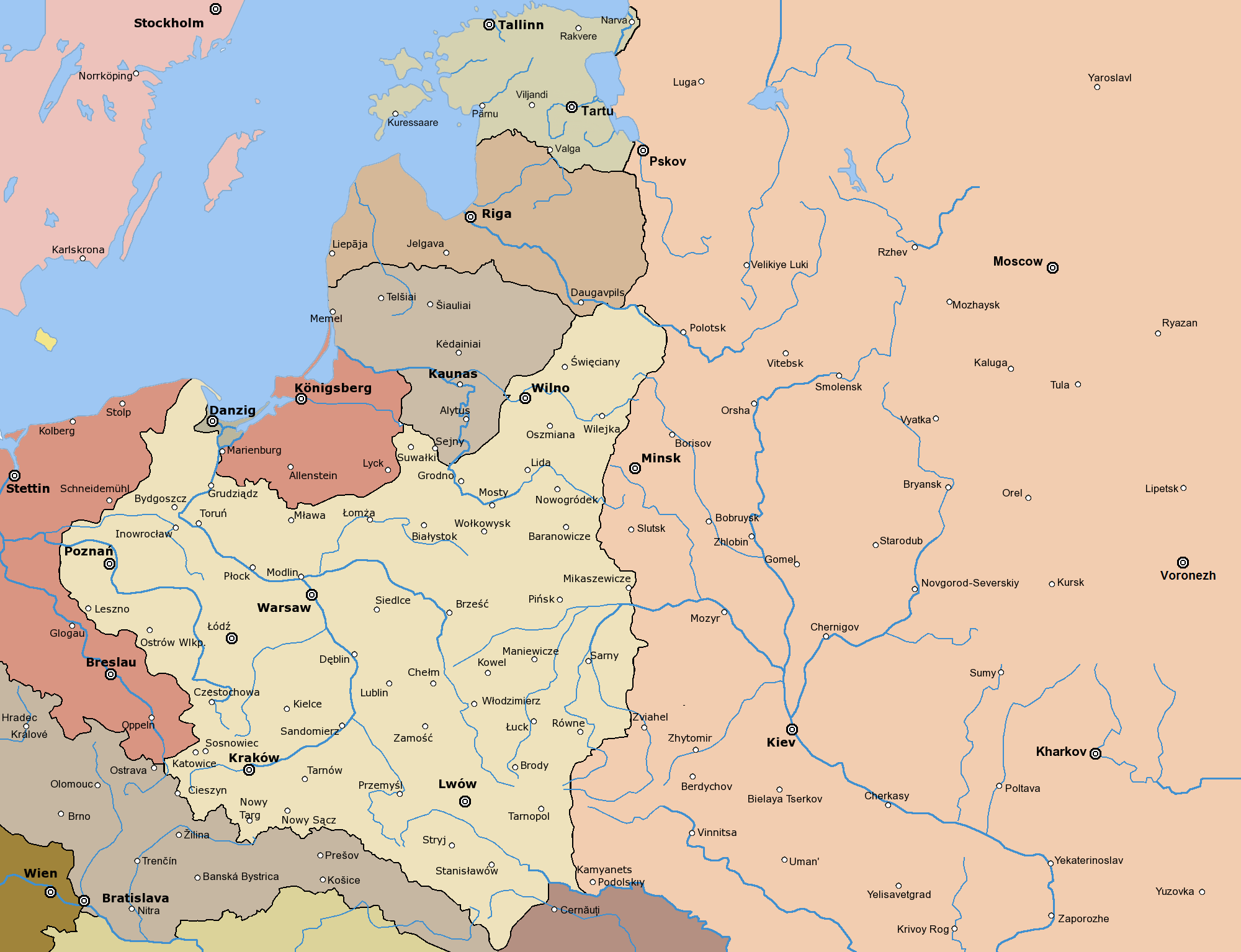
Borders established during the Peace of Riga.

- March 18: The Polish–Soviet War ends with the Peace of Riga.
- April 24: The Fiuman electorate approves the idea of a Free State of Fiume.
- August 25: The U.S.–German Peace Treaty and the U.S.–Austrian Peace Treaty are signed, marking the formal end of the state of war between the two states and the United States instead of the Treaty of Versailles and the Treaty of Saint-Germain that were not ratified by the United States.
- August 29: The U.S.–Hungarian Peace Treaty is signed, marking the formal end of the state of war between the two states instead of the Treaty of Trianon that was not ratified by the United States.
- October 5: Foundation of the Sturmabteilung (SA), the paramilitary wing of the German Nazi Party.
- November 9: Foundation of the Italian National Fascist Party by Benito Mussolini during the Third Fascist Congress in Rome.

== 1922 ==
- February 6: The Washington Naval Conference ends with the signing of the Washington Naval Treaty by the United Kingdom, the United States, Japan, France, and Italy. The signing parties agree to limit the size of their naval forces.
- March: The first German officers travel to the Soviet Union for the purposes of military cooperation between Germany and the Soviet Union.
- April 16: Germany and the Soviet Union sign the Treaty of Rapallo, re-establishing diplomatic relations, renouncing financial claims on each other, and pledging future economic cooperation.
- October: The Russian Civil War (ongoing since 7 November 1917) ends in Bolshevik victory with the defeat of the last White forces in Siberia.
- October 11: Armistice of Mudanya is signed in the Turkish War of Independence.
- October 29: Fascist leader Benito Mussolini is appointed prime minister of Italy by king Victor Emmanuel III following the March on Rome.
- November 1: The Grand National Assembly of Turkey abolishes the Ottoman Sultanate.

== 1923 ==
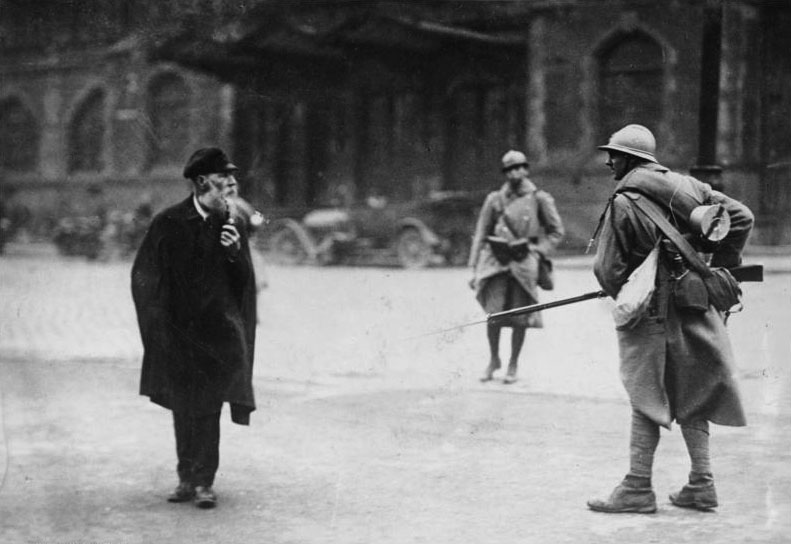
Two French soldiers and a German civilian in the Ruhr during its occupation by the French and Belgians, 1923.

- January 11: France and Belgium occupy the Ruhr in an effort to compel Germany to comply with its war reparations obligations.
- January 26: The Nationalist Kuomintang party and the Chinese Communist Party form the First United Front to end warlordism in China.
- June: In the Great Inflation of 1923, the value of the German mark is destroyed.
- July 24: The Treaty of Lausanne, settling the boundaries of modern Turkey, is signed in Switzerland by Turkey and the Entente powers. It marks the end of the Turkish War of Independence and replaces the earlier Treaty of Sèvres
- August 31: The Corfu incident: Italy bombards and occupies the Greek island of Corfu seeking to pressure Greece to pay reparations for the murder of an Italian general in Greece.
- September 27: The Corfu incident ends; Italian troops withdraw after the Conference of Ambassadors rules in favor of Italian demands of reparations from Greece.
- October 23–25: The Hamburg Uprising occurs.
- October 29: Turkey officially becomes a Republic following the dissolution of the Ottoman Empire.
- November 8: The Beer Hall Putsch takes place, in which Adolf Hitler unsuccessfully leads the Nazis in an attempt to overthrow the German government. It is crushed by police the next day.

== 1924 ==
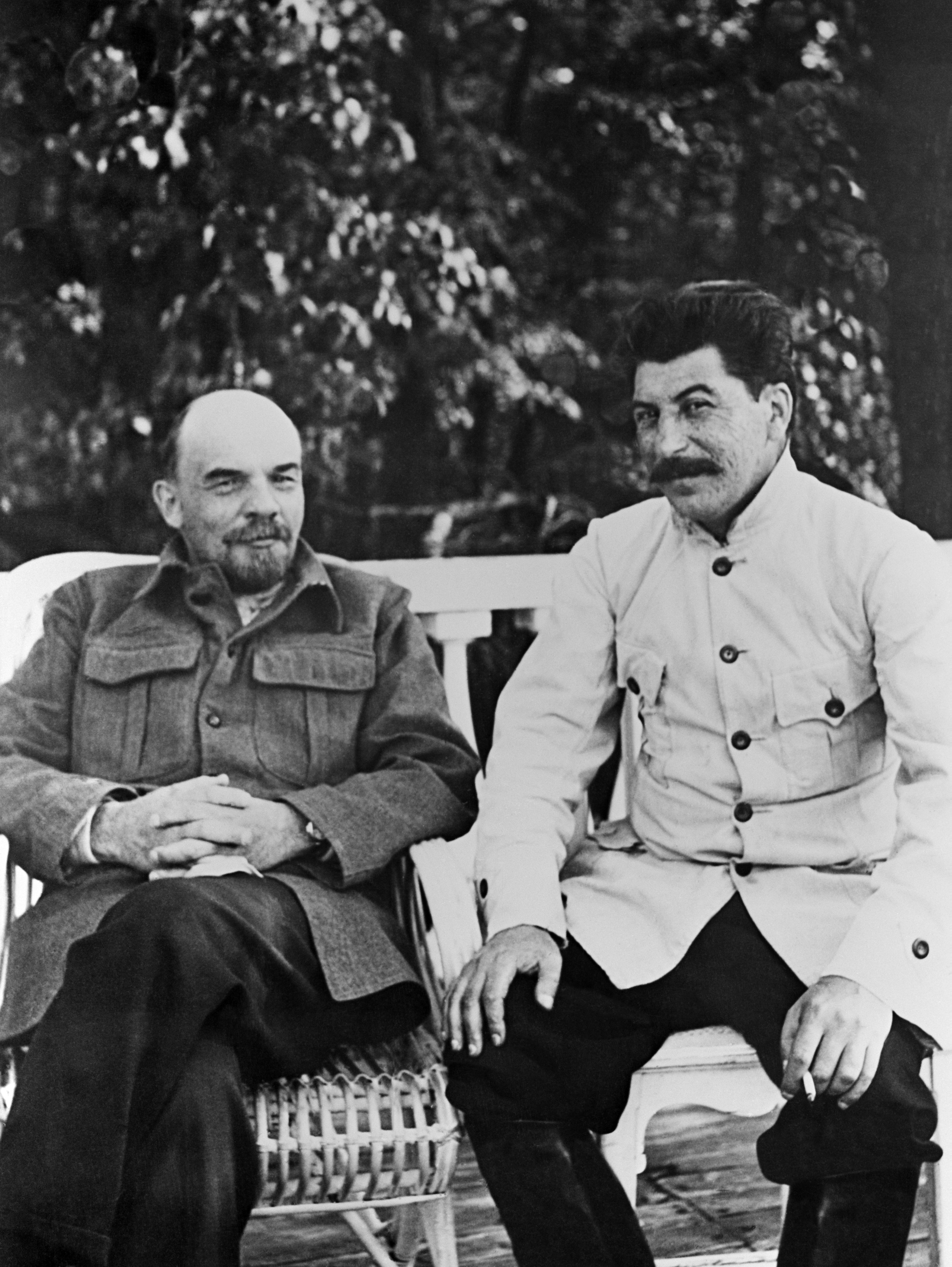
Lenin and Stalin

- January 21: Leader of the Soviet Union Vladimir Lenin dies, and Joseph Stalin begins purging rivals to clear the way for his dictatorship.
- February 1: The United Kingdom extends diplomatic recognition to the Soviet Union.
- March 16: Italy annexes the Free State of Fiume.
- April 1: Adolf Hitler is sentenced to 5 years in prison for his participation in the Beer Hall Putsch (he serves only 8 months).
- April 6: Fascists win the 1924 Italian general election with a 2/3 majority.
- June 10: Italian Fascists kidnap and kill socialist leader Giacomo Matteotti in Rome.
- August 16: The Dawes Plan is accepted. It ends the Allied occupation of the Ruhr and sets a staggered plan for Germany's payment of war reparations.
- August 18: France begins withdrawing its troops from the Ruhr in Germany.

== 1925 ==
- January 20: Signing of the Soviet–Japanese Basic Convention that normalizes relations between Japan and the Soviet Union.
- April 4: Foundation of the paramilitary Nazi party organization the Schutzstaffel (SS). Originally intended as a personal bodyguard unit for party leader Adolf Hitler, the SS would grow in size and importance.
- May 12: Retired Field marshal Paul von Hindenburg is elected President of Germany.
- July 18: Hitler's autobiographical manifesto Mein Kampf is published.
- December 1: The Locarno Treaties are signed in London (they are ratified September 14, 1926). The treaties settle the borders of western Europe and normalize relations between Germany and the Allied powers of western Europe.

== 1926 ==
- January 3: Theodoros Pangalos declares himself dictator of Greece. He would be elected president on April 4.
- January 31: British and Belgian troops leave Cologne, Germany.
- April 24: The Treaty of Berlin is signed by Germany and the Soviet Union, which declares neutrality if either country is attacked within the next five years.
- September 8: Germany joins the League of Nations.
- December 25: Emperor Taishō dies, and is succeeded by his son Hirohito as the Emperor of Japan.

== 1927 ==
- April 12: The Shanghai massacre of 5,000-10,000 communists, perpetrated by the Kuomintang, marks the end of the First United Front and the beginning of the Chinese Civil War, which evolved into a proxy war between the Soviet Union and Nazi Germany until 1936.
- May 20: Saudi Arabia and the United Kingdom sign the Treaty of Jeddah.
- June 7: Peter Voikov, Soviet ambassador to Warsaw, is assassinated by a White movement activist.
- November 12: Leon Trotsky is expelled from the Soviet Communist Party, leaving Joseph Stalin with undisputed control of the Soviet Union.
- December 14: Iraq gains independence from the United Kingdom.

== 1928 ==
- May 3: The Jinan incident begins, a limited armed conflict between the Republic of China and Japan.
- May 28: Foundation of the Chinese Red Army.
- June 4: Huanggutun incident: Japanese agents assassinate the Chinese warlord Zhang Zuolin.
- August 2: Italy and Ethiopia sign the Italo-Ethiopian Treaty, pledging cooperation and friendship.
- August 27: The Kellogg–Briand Pact is signed in Paris by the major powers of the world. The treaty outlaws aggressive warfare.
- October 1: The Soviet Union launches the first five-year plan, an economic effort to increase industrialisation.
- November 6: Herbert Hoover handily wins the 1928 US president election defeating Al Smith.

== 1929 ==
- February 9: Litvinov Protocol is signed in Moscow by the Soviet Union, Poland, Estonia, Romania, and Latvia. The Pact outlaws aggressive warfare along the lines of the Kellogg-Briand Pact.
- February 11: Italy and the Holy See sign the Lateran Treaty, normalizing relations between the Vatican and Italy.
- March 28: Japan withdraws troops from China, ending the Jinan incident.
- April 3: Persia signs Litvinov's Pact.
- June 7: The Lateran Treaty is ratified, making the Vatican City a sovereign state.
- July 24: The Kellogg–Briand Pact goes into effect.
- August 31: The Young Plan, which sets the total World War I reparations owed by Germany at US$26,350,000,000 to be paid over a period of 58½ years, is finalized. It replaces the earlier Dawes Plan.
- October 29: The Great Depression begins with the Wall Street crash.

== 1930 ==
- April 22: The United Kingdom, United States, France, Italy and Japan sign the London Naval Treaty regulating submarine warfare and limiting naval shipbuilding.
- June 30: France withdraws its remaining troops from the Rhineland ending the occupation of the Rhineland.
- September 14: German election results in the Nazis becoming the second-largest party in the Reichstag.

== 1931 ==
- May 19: Launching of the first Deutschland-class cruiser, Deutschland. The construction of the ship causes consternation abroad as it was expected that the restriction of 10,000 tons displacement for these ships would limit the German Navy to coastal defense vessels, not ships capable of warfare on the open sea.
- September 18: Mukden incident: the Japanese military stage a false flag bombing against a Japanese-controlled railroad in the Chinese region of Manchuria, blaming Chinese dissidents for the attack, an incident that is considered by many to be the start of World War II in Asia.
- September 19: Using the Mukden Incident as a pretext, the Japanese invade Manchuria and create the Manchukuo puppet state.

== 1932 ==
- January 7: The Stimson Doctrine is proclaimed by United States Secretary of State Henry L. Stimson in response to Japan invading Manchuria. The Doctrine holds that the United States government will not recognize border changes that are made by force.
- January 28: January 28 incident: using a flare-up of anti-Japanese violence as a pretext, the Japanese attack Shanghai, China. Fighting ends on March 6, and on May 5 a ceasefire agreement is signed wherein Shanghai is made a demilitarized zone.
- February 27: Fighting between China and Japan in Manchuria ends with Japan in control of Manchuria.
- March 1: Japan creates the puppet state Manchukuo out of occupied Manchuria.
- April 10: Paul von Hindenburg is reelected President of Germany, defeating Adolf Hitler in a run-off.
- May 4: The Soviet–Estonian Non-Aggression Pact is signed. It will enter into force on 18 August 1932 and will remain in force until 31 December 1945.
- May 30: Chancellor of Germany Heinrich Brüning resigns. President Hindenburg asks Franz von Papen to form a new government.
- July 25: Soviet–Polish Non-Aggression Pact is signed with it being initially effective for three years.
- August 30: Hermann Göring is elected chairman of the German Reichstag.
- November 4: Japan starts a counterinsurgency campaign in Manchukuo, known as the Pacification of Manchukuo.
- November 8: Franklin D. Roosevelt defeats Herbert Hoover in the 1932 presidential election by a landslide.
- November 21: President Hindenburg begins talking to Hitler about forming a new government.
- December 3: Hindenburg names Kurt von Schleicher Chancellor of Germany.

== 1933 ==
- January 1: Defense of the Great Wall: Japan attacks the fortified eastern end of the Great Wall of China in Rehe Province in Inner Mongolia.
- January 30: Hitler is appointed Chancellor of Germany by President Hindenburg.
- February 27: Germany's parliament building, the Reichstag, is set on fire.
- February 28: Using the Reichstag fire as a pretext, the Reichstag Fire Decree is issued by President Paul von Hindenburg, nullifying many German civil liberties and paving the way for the Nazi seizure of power.
- March 4: Franklin Delano Roosevelt is inaugurated as President of the United States. He launches the New Deal economic program, intended to counteract the effects of the Great Depression.
- March 20: Germany's first concentration camp, Dachau, is completed.
- March 23: The Reichstag passes the Enabling Act, making Adolf Hitler dictator of Germany.
- March 24: The Daily Express newspaper is published with headline "Judea Declares War on Germany", calling for boycott of German goods and for mass demonstrations.
- March 25: 1933 anti-Nazi boycott
- March 27: Japan leaves the League of Nations over the League of Nations' Lytton Report that found that Manchuria belongs to China and that Manchukuo was not a truly independent state.
- April 1: Germans are told to boycott Jewish shops and businesses.
- April 26: The Gestapo secret police is established in Germany.
- May 1: President Hindenburg and Chancellor Hitler appear before a crowd of 500,000 in Berlin as International Workers' Day is declared as "Day of National Labor" by the Nazi regime.
- May 2: Hitler outlaws trade unions.
- May 15: Official formation of the Luftwaffe, the German air force built in secret in violation of the Treaty of Versailles.
- May 31: The Tanggu Truce is signed between China and Japan, setting the ceasefire conditions between the two states after the Japanese occupation of Manchuria. China accedes to all Japanese demands, creating a large demilitarized zone inside Chinese territory.
- June 21: All non-Nazi parties are banned in Germany.
- July 14: The Nazi party becomes the official party of Germany.
- August 25: Haavara Agreement: The agreement was designed to help facilitate the emigration of German Jews to Palestine.
- September 2: Italy and the USSR sign the Italo-Soviet Pact.
- September 12: Leo Szilard conceives the idea of the nuclear chain reaction.
- October 19: Germany leaves the League of Nations over objections to the Conference for the Reduction and Limitation of Armaments.
- November 16: The United States extends diplomatic recognition to the Soviet Union.
- November 24: Homeless, alcoholic, and unemployed sent to Nazi concentration camps.

== 1934 ==
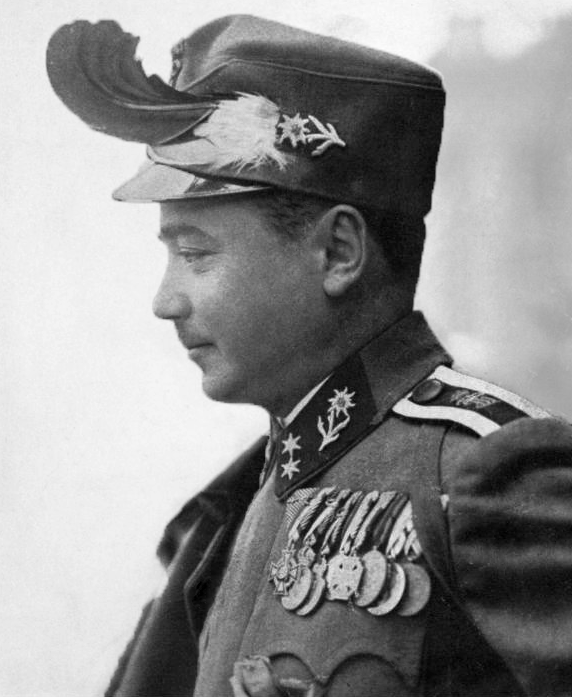
The unfortunate Engelbert Dollfuss

- January 26: Germany and Poland sign the 10 year German-Polish Non-Aggression Pact. From the German point of the view, the pact was intended to prevent Poland from intervening in an attempt to prevent the rearmament of Germany.
- February 9: Balkan Pact, a military alliance is signed between Greece, Turkey, Romania and Yugoslavia. The intention of signing this treaty was to counteract plans being made by Italy to acquire new territories along with Bulgaria's intention to try and reclaim lost territories.
- February 12–16: The Austrian Civil War is fought, ending with Austrofascist victory.
- March 20: All German police forces come under the command of Heinrich Himmler.
- May 5: Soviet–Polish Non-Aggression Pact is extended to December 31, 1945.

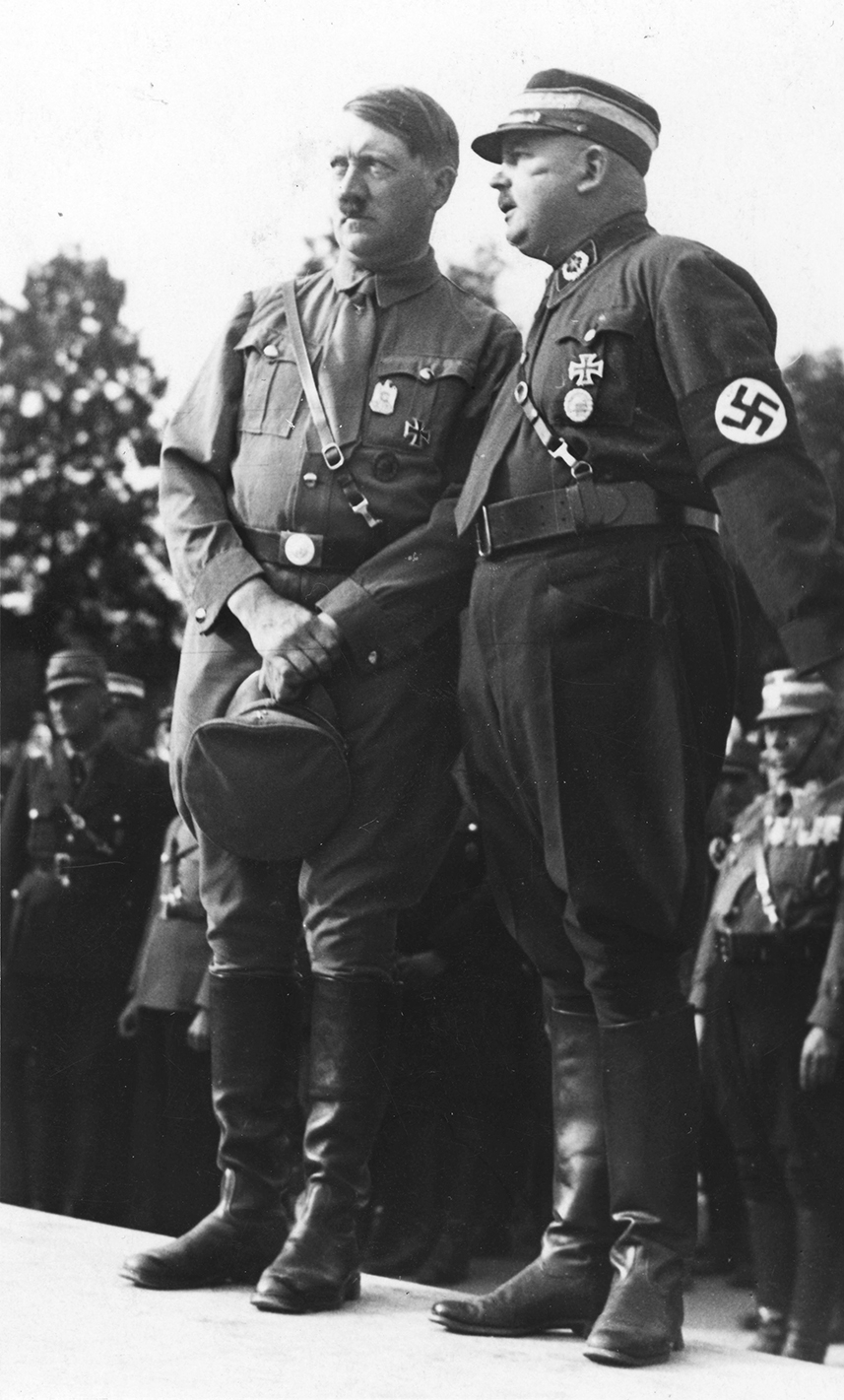
"Long knives" victim Ernst Röhm with Hitler, August 1933

- June 30: Night of the Long Knives in Germany. Potential rivals to Hitler within the Nazi Party, including SA leader Ernst Röhm and prominent anti-Nazi conservatives such as, former Chancellor Kurt von Schleicher, are killed by the SS and the Gestapo. Following this event, the SA continues to exist but loses almost all its influence and is effectively superseded by the SS.
- July 20: The SS becomes an organization independent of the Nazi Party, reporting directly to Adolf Hitler.
- July 25: Austrian dictator Engelbert Dollfuss bans Nazis in Austria. Austrian Nazis assassinate him during the failed July Putsch against the Austrian government.
- August 2: Upon the death of President Hindenburg, Hitler makes himself Führer of Germany, becoming Head of State as well as Chancellor.
- August 8: Members of the Wehrmacht begin swearing a personal oath of loyalty to Hitler instead of to the German constitution.
- September: The Soviet Union joins the League of Nations.
- October 5: Left-wing parties in the Second Spanish Republic start the Revolution of 1934 against the right-wing government.
- October 9: King Alexander I of Yugoslavia and French foreign minister Louis Barthou are assassinated in Marseille Alexander's political murder further destabilized the Balkans. Barthou and Alexander were working for peace in Europe, particularly between Germany and the USSR, as they prepared both France and Yugoslavia for war. Prince Peter II takes Alexander's place but because he is a minor a regency council would take control.
- October 16: Beginning of the Long March where the Chinese Red Army retreats to evade the pursuit of Kuomintang forces.
- December 1: Sergei Kirov, head of the Leningrad Communist Party, is murdered by an unknown assailant, precipitating a wave of repression in the Soviet Union.
- December 5: The Abyssinia Crisis begins with the Walwal incident, an armed clash between Italian and Ethiopian troops on the border of Ethiopia.
- December 29: Japan renounces the Washington Naval Treaty and the London Naval Treaty.

== 1935 ==
- January 7: The League of Nations approves the results of the Saar plebiscite, which allows Saar to be incorporated into German borders.
- June 18: The Anglo-German Naval Agreement is signed by Germany and the United Kingdom. The agreement allows Germany to build a fleet that's 35% the tonnage of the British fleet. In this way, the British hope to limit German naval rearmament. Germany builds a large amount of ships, submarines, planes, artillery, tanks, and zeppelins, disobeying the treaty of Versailles.
- August 31: The Neutrality Act of 1935 is passed in the United States imposing a general embargo on trading in arms and war materials with all parties in a war and it also declared that American citizens traveling on ships of warring nations traveled at their own risk.
- September 15: The Reichstag passes the Nuremberg Laws, institutionalizing discrimination against Jews and providing the legal framework for the systematic persecution of Jews in Germany.
- October 3: Italy invades Ethiopia, beginning the Second Italo-Ethiopian War. The League of Nations denounces Italy and calls for an oil embargo that fails.
- November 14: Final British General election until 1945. Stanley Baldwin replaces Ramsay MacDonald as Prime Minister.

== 1936 ==
- January 20: George V, King of the United Kingdom dies. The Prince of Wales succeeds him as King Edward VIII.
- February 6: Germany hosts the 1936 Winter Olympics in Garmisch-Partenkirchen, Bavaria.
- February 26: The February 26 incident occurs in Japan where a group of 1,400 officers and soldiers of the Imperial Way faction stage a military coup which lasts until February 29 when the government suppresses the rebellion.
- March 7: In violation of the Treaty of Versailles, Germany remilitarizes the Rhineland.
- Following the Rhineland move Hitler met separately with French journalist Bertrand de Jouvenel and British analyst Arnold J. Toynbee emphasizing his limited expansionist aim of building a greater German nation, and his desire for British understanding and cooperation.
- King Edward VIII, over the head of the Baldwin Government, orders the military to stand down in relation to the move.
- March 25: The Second London Naval Treaty is signed by the United Kingdom, United States, and France. Italy and Japan each declined to sign this treaty.
- May 5: Italian troops march into the Ethiopian capital, Addis Ababa, marking the end of the Second Italo–Abyssinian War.
- June 3: Luftwaffe Chief of Staff General Walther Wever loses his life in an air crash, ending any hope for the Luftwaffe to ever have a strategic bombing force similar to the Allies.

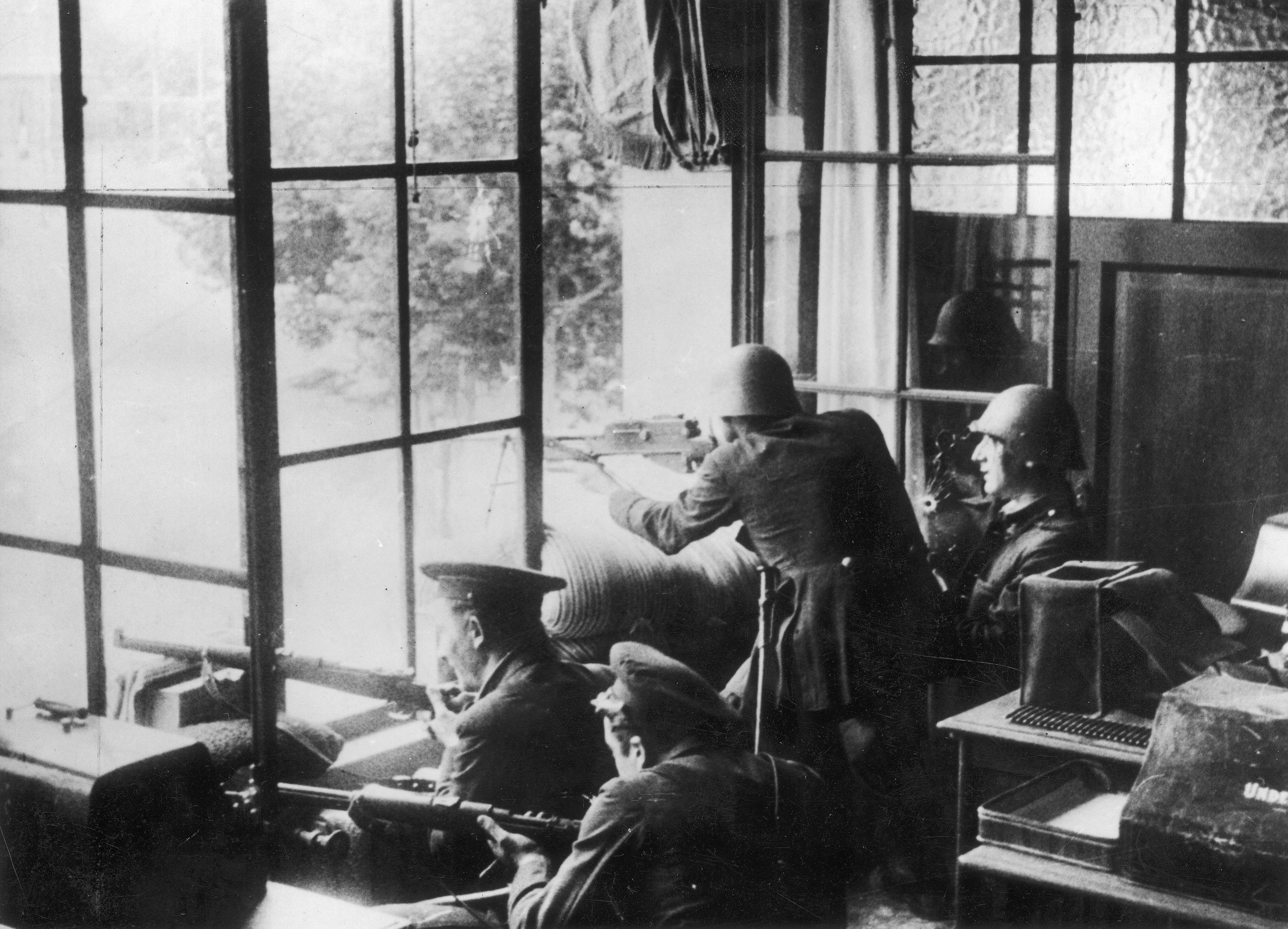
Fighting during the initial beginning of the Spanish Civil War, July 1936.

- July 18: The Spanish coup of July 1936 by Nationalist forces marks the beginning of the Spanish Civil War. The coup initially begins in Spanish Morocco when a garrison of Spanish Foreign Legion soldiers rebel. This rebellion later spreads across the whole country.
- August 1: Germany hosts the 1936 Summer Olympics in Berlin.
- August 19: Commencement of the first Moscow show trials against Old Bolshevik Party leaders and top officials of the Soviet secret police.
- October: The Great Purge truly commences in the Soviet Union with widespread repression of suspected opponents of the regime. The purge leads to the imprisonment and death of many military officers and even leaders of the Party and the Comintern, weakening the Soviet military ahead of World War II.
- October 18: Hermann Göring is made head of the German Four Year Plan, an effort to make Germany self-sufficient through autarky and increase armaments.
- November 3: Franklin D. Roosevelt wins reelection defeating Alf Landon.
- November 14: Suiyuan campaign begins as Japanese-backed Mongolian troops attack the Chinese garrison at Hongort.
- November 15: The aerial German Condor Legion goes into action for the first time in the Spanish Civil War in support of the Nationalist side.
- November 25: The Anti-Comintern Pact is signed by Japan and Germany. The signing parties agree to go to war with the Soviet Union if one of the signatories is attacked by the Soviet Union.
- December 1: Hitler makes it mandatory for all males between the ages 10–18 to join the Hitler Youth.
- December 12: Kuomintang marshal Zhang Xueliang kidnaps Chinese leader Chiang Kai-shek in order to compel the Kuomintang to make a truce with the Chinese Communist party for the purpose of fighting the invading Japanese.
- Edward VIII is forced to abdicate due to his marriage to Wallis Simpson and is succeeded by Albert, Duke of York, who assumes the name King George VI
- December 23: The first 3,000 men of the Italian expeditionary force (later named Corpo Truppe Volontarie) lands in Cadiz in support of the Nationalist side in the Spanish Civil War.
- December 24: The Second United Front is formed between the Chinese Communist party and the Kuomintang, temporarily suspending the Chinese Civil War for the sake of fighting the Japanese.

== 1937 ==
- January 20: President Roosevelt begins his second term in his presidency.
- February 21: The Non-Intervention Committee of the League of Nations prohibits foreign intervention or involvement in the Spanish Civil War.
- April 26: Bombing of Guernica by the German Condor Legion and the Italian Aviazione Legionaria at the behest of Franco's Nationalists in the Spanish Civil War. The bombing claims many civilian lives and draws widespread condemnation internationally.
- May 7: The Condor Legion Fighter Group is deployed in Spain and begins to aid the Falangists.
- May 28: Neville Chamberlain becomes Prime Minister of the United Kingdom.
- June 21: Léon Blum's coalition government collapses.
- July 7: The Marco Polo Bridge incident occurs, beginning the Second Sino-Japanese War. Some scholars consider this to be the start of World War II. Japanese forces were doing military exercises near the Marco Polo Bridge; which begun on July 6 which the Chinese objected to but let occur. The Chinese requested that locals be informed of exercises occurring at night which the Japanese promised but did not end up doing this. During that night Captain Shimizu reported one of his soldiers, Private Shimura as being missing as he was not present during a rollcall but later reappeared 20 minutes later. However Shimizu postponed reporting Shimura's return by 4 hours for unknown reasons. The Japanese demanded they be granted access to search for the missing soldier in Chinese territory but the Chinese refused this request. Whether it was the Japanese or Chinese forces that fired first is unclear.
- August 8: Japanese forces occupy the city of Beijing.
- August 13: Second Sino-Japanese War: Battle of Shanghai commences.
- October 5: President Roosevelt gives the Quarantine Speech outlining a move away from neutrality and towards "quarantining" all aggressors.
- October 13: Germany notifies Belgium that its sovereignty will be guaranteed as long as Belgium refrains from taking part in military action against Germany.
- November 5: Adolf Hitler holds a secret meeting in the Reich Chancellery and discusses the need for "lebensraum."
- November 6: Italy joins the Anti-Comintern Pact.
- November 26: Second Sino-Japanese War: Battle of Shanghai ends in Japanese victory as Chinese forces evacuate the city.
- December 1: Second Sino-Japanese War: Battle of Nanjing commences as Japanese forces attack the city.
- December 8: Japan established the puppet state of Mengjiang in the Inner Mongolia region of the Republic of China.
- December 11: Italy leaves the League of Nations.
- December 12: The USS Panay incident occurs, where Japanese aircraft attacked the American gunboat Panay which was carrying American evacuees and escorting four Standard Oil Barges. 3 people end up being killed in the attack while 11 are wounded; which leads to a diplomatic crisis between the US and Japan.
- December 13: Second Sino-Japanese War: start of the Rape of Nanjing following Japanese victory in the Battle of Nanjing.

== 1938 ==
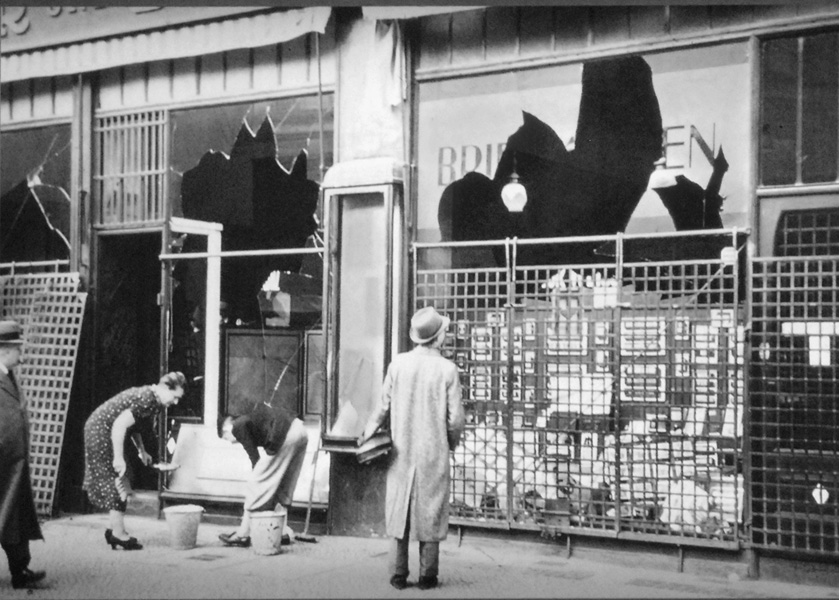
Aftermath of Kristallnacht, the Night of Broken Glass (9–10 November 1938)

- January 26: The Allison incident occurs further straining relations between Japan and the United States.
- March 6: Japanese troops reach the Yellow River in China.
- March 13: The Anschluss: Germany annexes Austria.
- March 24: Second Sino-Japanese War: Battle of Taierzhuang commences. The battle ends with Chinese victory on 7 April after intense house-to-house fighting inside the city of Taierzhuang.
- Second Sino-Japanese War: Battle of Xuzhou begins, and ends in Japanese victory on May 1 as Chinese troops break out from the encircled city.
- July 6–16: Évian Conference: The United States and the United Kingdom refuse to accept any more Jewish refugees.
- July 29: The Soviet–Japanese border conflicts begin with the Battle of Lake Khasan.
- August: Soviet Union wins the Battle of Lake Khasan against Japan.
- September 27: U.S. President Roosevelt sends a letter to German Führer Adolf Hitler seeking peace.
- September 30: The Munich Agreement is signed by Germany, France, the United Kingdom, and Italy. The agreement allows Germany to annex the Czechoslovak Sudetenland area in exchange for peace in an attempt to appease Hitler. Related: Polish–Czechoslovak border conflicts § Annexations by Poland in 1938

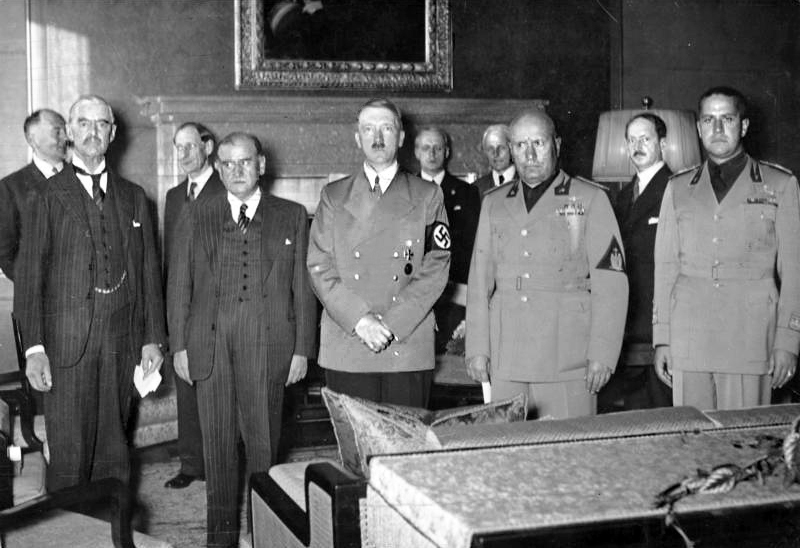
From left to right: Chamberlain, Daladier, Hitler, Mussolini, and Ciano pictured before signing the Munich Agreement, which gave the Sudetenland to Germany.

.

- October 5: Germany invalidates the passports of all its Jewish citizens who are reissued passports with the letter "J" stamped in red. This change was made after requests by Sweden and Switzerland who wanted a way of easily denying Jews entry into their countries.
- November 7: Polish-German Jew Herschel Grynszpan shoots the German consular aide Ernst vom Rath in Paris.
- November 9: The Nazis use von Rath's death as the pretext for the Kristallnacht Pogrom in Germany; thousands of Jewish shops and synagogues are smashed, looted, burned, and destroyed throughout the country.

== 1939 ==
The world powers in 1939, before the start of World War II.

- January 25: A uranium atom is split for the first time at Columbia University in the United States.
- January 27: Hitler orders Plan Z, a 5-year naval expansion programme intended to provide for a huge German fleet capable of defeating the British Royal Navy by 1944. The Kriegsmarine is given the first priority on the allotment of German economic resources. This is the first and only time the Kriegsmarine is given the first priority in the history of the Third Reich.
- March 14: The Slovak Republic, a pro-German puppet state, is established.
- March 15: Germany occupies and annexes Bohemia and Moravia-Silesia in violation of the Munich Agreement. The Czechs do not attempt to put up any organized resistance, having lost their main defensive line with the annexation of the Sudetenland.
- Germany establishes the Protectorate of Bohemia and Moravia. The Second Czechoslovak Republic is dissolved.
- Hungary invades the recently created Carpatho-Ukraine.
- March 20: German Foreign Minister Joachim von Ribbentrop delivers an oral ultimatum to Lithuania, demanding that it cede the Klaipėda Region (German name Memel) to Germany.
- March 21: Hitler demands the return of the Free City of Danzig to Germany.
- March 23: German–Romanian Treaty for the Development of Economic Relations between the Two Countries is signed.
- Germany annexes the Klaipėda Region.
- Germany and Slovakia sign the Schutzzonenvertrag zwischen Deutschland und Slowakei (Treaty on the protective relationship between Germany and the Slovak State), creating the German Zone of Protection in Slovakia.
- The Slovak–Hungarian War begins.
- March 25: King Zog of Albania refuses Italy's ultimatum demanding to hand over control of the country.
- March 31: The United Kingdom and France offer a guarantee of Polish independence.
- The Slovak–Hungarian War ends.
- April 1: The Spanish Civil War ends in Nationalist victory. Spain becomes a dictatorship with Francisco Franco as the head of the new government serving until his death in 1975.
- April 3: Hitler orders the German military to start planning for Fall Weiss (Case White), the codename for the attack on Poland, planned to be launched on August 25, 1939.
- April 4: Hungary and Slovakia sign the Budapest Treaty, handing over a strip of eastern Slovak territory to Hungary.
- April 7–12: In response to refusing their ultimatum, Italy invades Albania with little military resistance in the way. Albania is later annexed and made part of Italy through a personal union of the Italian and Albanian crown.
- April 14: U.S. President Roosevelt sends letter to German Chancellor Hitler and Italian Prime Minister Mussolini seeking peace.
- April 18: The Soviet Union proposes a tripartite alliance with the United Kingdom and France. It is rejected.
- April 28: In a speech before the Reichstag, Hitler renounces the Anglo-German Naval Agreement.
- April 29: Hitler renounces the German–Polish declaration of non-aggression.

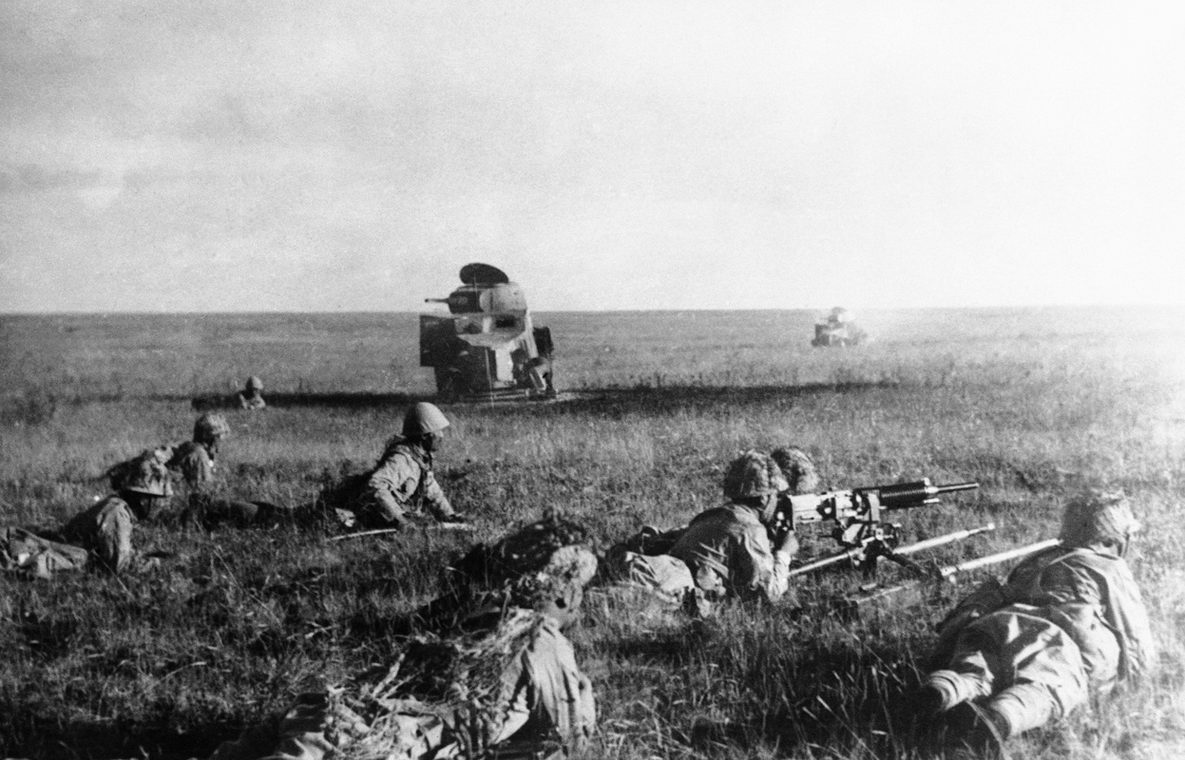
Japanese infantry at the Battle of Khalkin Gol near two wrecked Soviet armored cars, July 1939.

- May 9: Spain leaves the League of Nations.
- May 11: Soviet–Japanese border conflicts: The Battle of Khalkhin Gol begins with Japan and Manchukuo against the Soviet Union and Mongolia. The battle ends in Soviet victory on September 16, influencing the Japanese not to seek further conflict with the Soviets, but to turn towards the Pacific holdings of the Euro-American powers instead.
- May 17: Sweden, Norway, and Finland reject Germany's offer of non-aggression pacts.
- May 22: The Pact of Steel, known formally as the "Pact of Friendship and Alliance between Germany and Italy", is signed by Fascist Italy and Nazi Germany. The Pact declares further cooperation between the two powers, but in a secret supplement the Pact is detailed as a military alliance.
- May 31: Denmark and Germany sign a non-aggression pact which is later broken when Germany invades Denmark the following year.
- June 7: The German–Estonian and the German–Latvian non-aggression pacts are concluded. They are to remain in force for ten years. However they are broken when Germany invades both countries in 1941.
- June 14: The Tientsin incident occurs, in which the Japanese blockade the British concession in the North China Treaty Port of Tientsin, now called Tianjin.
- July 10: Prime Minister Neville Chamberlain reaffirms support for Poland and makes it clear that Britain did not view Free City of Danzig as being an internal German-Polish affair and would intervene on behalf of Poland if hostilities broke out between the two countries.
- August 2: The Einstein–Szilard letter is sent to President Roosevelt. Written by Leo Szilard and signed by Albert Einstein, it warned of the danger that Germany might develop atomic bombs. This letter prompted action by Roosevelt and eventually resulted in the Manhattan Project.
- August 15: 1939 Neuhammer disaster
- August 23: The Molotov–Ribbentrop Pact is signed between Nazi Germany and the Soviet Union, with secret provisions for the division of Eastern Europe – joint occupation of Poland and Soviet occupation of Estonia, Latvia and Lithuania, Finland and Bessarabia. This protocol removes the threat of Soviet intervention during the German invasion of Poland.
- August 25: Included Anglo-Polish alliance which caused concern in Italy. In response to a message from Mussolini that Italy will not honor the Pact of Steel if Germany attacks Poland, Hitler delays the launch of the invasion by five days to provide more time to secure British and French neutrality. The information about the postponement of the attack on Poland does not reach some of Germany's allies and they attack Poland on the night of August 25/26 - Jabłonków incident.
- August 28: Tarnów train station bombing: A German agent named Antoni Guzy leaves a bomb inside two suitcases at the Tarnów train station in Poland that later explodes killing 24 people. It was one of several incidents carried by Germany in Poland during the summer of 1939 to justify invasion.
- August 30: Nazi Germany issues an ultimatum to Poland concerning the Polish Corridor and the Free City of Danzig.
- August 31: Gleiwitz incident: Germany stages a false flag attack on the German radio station Sender Gleiwitz to manufacture a pretext for war with Poland.
- September 1: Without response to its ultimatum, Germany invades Poland, starting World War II (Slovakia attacks Poland together with the Germans, and the Soviet Union invades Poland on September 17 in accordance with the Molotov–Ribbentrop Pact).

== See also ==
- International relations (1919–1939)
- Causes of World War II
- Timeline of World War I
- List of timelines of World War II
- Events preceding World War II in Europe
- Events preceding World War II in Asia
