= Anglo-Polish alliance =

WWII-era treaty

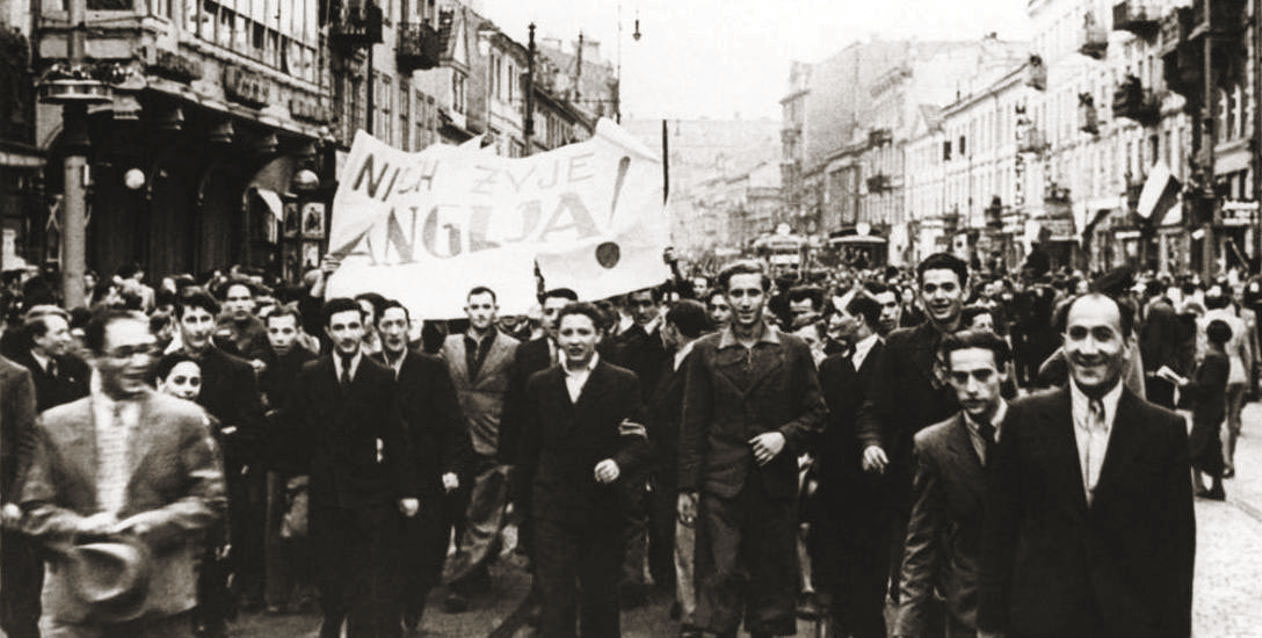
Varsovians hold a banner declaring Niech żyje Anglia! (transl. Long live England!) outside the British Embassy in Branicki Palace following the British declaration of war with Nazi Germany, 1939

The military alliance between the United Kingdom and Poland was formalised by the Anglo-Polish Agreement on 31 March 1939, with subsequent addenda of 1940 and 1944, for mutual assistance in case of a military invasion from Nazi Germany, as specified in a secret protocol.

== Background ==
The United Kingdom (First Chamberlain ministry) had been attempting to create a four-way alliance to contain Nazi Germany, with France (then governed by Édouard Daladier), Poland and the Soviet Union. Polish Foreign Minister Józef Beck was disturbed by the prospect of any alliance with Stalin's Soviet Union because it conflicted with Poland's policy of maintaining distance from Nazi Germany and the Soviet Union. He also feared the reaction of the Hitler regime to the four-way alliance, which might be seen as the encirclement of Nazi Germany. Beck, however, saw an opportunity and so he proposed a secret agreement on consultation to British Foreign Secretary Lord Halifax that was received on 24 March 1939. When questioned by Halifax, Polish Ambassador to the United Kingdom Raczyński said that Beck had British aid in mind in the event of an attack on Poland, but it would not be a mutual agreement.

== British assurance to Poland ==
On 31 March 1939, in response to Nazi Germany's defiance of the Munich Agreement and its occupation of Czechoslovakia, in Parliament, Chamberlain pledged the support of the UK and France to assure Polish independence:

...in the event of any action which clearly threatened Polish independence, and which the Polish Government accordingly considered it vital to resist with their national forces, His Majesty's Government would feel themselves bound at once to lend the Polish Government all support in their power. They have given the Polish Government an assurance to this effect. I may add that the French Government have authorised me to make it plain that they stand in the same position in this matter as do His Majesty's Government.

The British Chiefs of Staff at the time, however, noted that "we could give no direct help by land, sea or air."

On 6 April, when the Polish foreign minister visited London, it was agreed to formalise the assurance as an Anglo–Polish military alliance, pending negotiations. The text of the "Anglo-Polish Communiqué" stated that the two governments were "in complete agreement on certain general principles" and that it was "agreed that the two countries were prepared to enter into an agreement of permanent and reciprocal character." The British Blue Book for 1939 indicates that formal agreement was not signed until 25 August.

That assurance was extended on 13 April to Greece and Romania, after Fascist Italy had begun the invasion of Albania.

== Agreement of Mutual Assistance ==
On 25 August 1939, two days after the Molotov–Ribbentrop Pact, a non-aggression pact between Nazi Germany and the Soviet Union with a secret protocol that partitioned Central and Eastern Europe between them, Britain and Poland signed an agreement for mutual assistance. The agreement contained promises of mutual military assistance between the nations if either was attacked by some "European country". The United Kingdom, sensing a trend of German expansionism, sought to discourage German aggression by this show of solidarity. In a secret protocol of the pact, the United Kingdom offered assistance in the case of an attack on Poland specifically by Germany, but in the case of attack by other countries, the parties were required only to "consult together on measures to be taken in common". Both the United Kingdom and Poland were bound not to enter agreements with any other third countries that were a threat to the other. Because of the pact's signing, Hitler postponed his planned invasion of Poland from 26 August until 1 September.

On the night of 25–26 August, a German sabotage group, unaware of the delay, made an attack on the Jablunkov Pass and Mosty railway station in Silesia. On the morning of 26 August, this group was repelled by Polish troops. The German side described the attack as "caused by an insane individual". The incident warned the Polish Armed Forces that an invasion was imminent, causing the Polish government to quietly begin accelerating mobilization efforts. The Polish Air Force would disperse most of its operational aircraft to secondary airfields. As a result, the Luftwaffe bombed mostly empty airfields on the first couple of days of the war.

== Failed Soviet–Franco–British alliance ==
After the German occupation of Prague in March 1939 in violation of the Munich Agreement, the Chamberlain government in Britain sought Soviet and French support for a Peace Front. The goal was to deter further German aggression by guaranteeing the independence of Poland and Romania. However, Stalin refused to pledge Soviet support for the guarantees unless Britain and France first concluded a military alliance with the Soviet Union. Although the British cabinet decided to seek such an alliance, the western negotiators in Moscow in August 1939 lacked urgency. The talks were conducted poorly and slowly by diplomats with little authority, such as William Strang, an assistant under-secretary. Also, Central and Eastern European countries such as Poland, Romania, Finland and the Baltic states had hostile relations with Soviet Union and anticipated that the Soviets wanted to control them. Although Hitler was escalating threats against it, Poland refused to allow Soviet troops to cross its border due to the assumed risk that they would never leave.

Meanwhile, both Great Britain and USSR were separately involved into secret negotiations with Nazi Germany. Declassified documents show that after France demonstrated little interest in upholding the Franco-Soviet Treaty of Mutual Assistance, Great Britain did not respond to Soviet requests for a defensive attack on Germany with the Soviet Union pledging one million Soviet troops on the Polish-German border. However no deployment would be possible without Polish agreement, which was not forthcoming. The Soviet Union then changed its strategy and focused on expanding its sphere of influence in Central and Eastern Europe in cooperation with Nazi Germany, which ultimately led to the signing of the Molotov-Ribbentrop Pact and the joint German-Soviet invasion of Poland.

== Polish–British Naval Agreement ==
Ever since it had been sent to Britain in the last days of August 1939 during Operation Peking, the Polish Navy remained in British waters. In November 1939, after the Invasion of Poland, the Polish-British Naval Agreement allowed Polish sailors to wear their Polish uniforms and to have Polish commanding officers on board even though the ships were of British make. The agreement would later be revised on 5 August 1940 to encompass all Polish units.

== Anglo–Polish Agreement Respecting Polish Land and Air Forces ==
On 5 August 1940 an agreement was signed that "the Polish Armed Forces (comprising Land, Sea, and Air Forces) shall be organized and employed under British Command" but would be "subject to Polish military law and disciplinary ruling, and they [would] be tried in Polish military courts". The only change came on 11 October 1940, when the Polish Air Force was made an exception and became subject to British discipline and laws.

== Analysis ==
The alliance committed Britain, for the first time in history, to fight on behalf of a European country other than France or Belgium. Hitler was then demanding the cession of the Free City of Danzig, an extraterritorial highway (the Reichsautobahn Berlin-Königsberg) across the Polish Corridor and privileges for the ethnic German minority within Poland. By the terms of the military alliance, both Poland and Britain were free to decide whether to oppose with force any territorial encroachment, as the pact did not include any statement of either party's commitment to the defence of the other party's territorial integrity. However, there were provisions regarding "indirect threats" and attempts to undermine either party's independence by means of "economic penetration" in a clear reference to the German demands.

In May 1939, Poland signed a secret protocol to the 1921 Franco-Polish Military Alliance, but it was not ratified by France until 4 September.

On 17 September, the Soviet Union invaded Poland through the eastern Polish border in keeping with the Molotov–Ribbentrop Pact's secret protocol specifying the division of Poland between Nazi Germany and Soviet Union. According to the Polish–British Common Defence Pact, the United Kingdom should give Poland "all the support and assistance in its power" if Poland was "engaged in hostilities with a European Power in consequence of aggression by the latter". The Polish ambassador in London, Edward Bernard Raczyński, contacted the British Foreign Office to point out that clause 1(b) of the agreement, which concerned an "aggression by a European power" on Poland, should apply to the Soviet invasion. Halifax responded that the obligation of British government towards Poland that arose out of the Anglo-Polish Agreement was restricted to Germany, according to the first clause of the secret protocol.

== Criticism ==
The Polish historian Paweł Wieczorkiewicz wrote, "Polish leaders were not aware of the fact that England and France were not ready for war. They needed time to catch up with the Third Reich, and were determined to gain the time at any price". The publicist Stanisław Mackiewicz stated in the late 1940s, "To accept London's guarantees was one of the most tragic dates in the history of Poland. It was a mental aberration and madness". On the same day that Britain pledged its support of Poland, Lord Halifax stated, "We do not think this guarantee will be binding". Another British diplomat, Alexander Cadogan, wrote in his diary: "Naturally, our guarantee does not give any help to Poland. It can be said that it was cruel to Poland, even cynical".

Polish-British military negotiations were carried out in London but ended up in a fiasco. After lengthy talks, the British reluctantly pledged to bomb German military and installations if the Germans carried out attacks of that kind in Poland. Polish military leaders failed to obtain any other promises. At the same time, the Polish side negotiated a military loan. The Polish ambassador to Britain, Edward Raczyński, called the negotiations "a never-ending nightmare". Józef Beck wrote in his memoirs, "The negotiations, carried out in London by Colonel Adam Koc, immediately turned into theoretical discussion about our financial system. It was clear that Sir John Simon and Frederick Leith-Ross did not realise the gravity of the situation. They negotiated in purely financial terms, without consideration for the rules of the wartime alliance. As a result, the English offer gave us no grounds for quick reinforcement of our army".

On 2 August 1939, Britain finally agreed to grant Poland a military loan of £8 million, which was less than Turkey received at the same time. Poland had asked for a loan of £60 million.

== See also ==
- International relations (1919–1939)
- Franco-Polish alliance
- Western betrayal
