= Jabłonków incident =

1939 German sabotage attempt in Poland before WWII

Coordinates: 49.5106°N 18.7514°E

- Part of the prelude to World War II
Date	26 August 1939
Location	Jablunkov Pass, now Czech Republic
Result	Polish victory: Acceleration of Polish mobilization; Transfer of most of operational aircraft of the Polish Air Force to secondary airfields

Belligerents
Germany	Poland

Commanders and leaders
(Nazi Germany) Hans Albrecht Herzner	

Casualties and losses
(Nazi Germany) 2 wounded	None

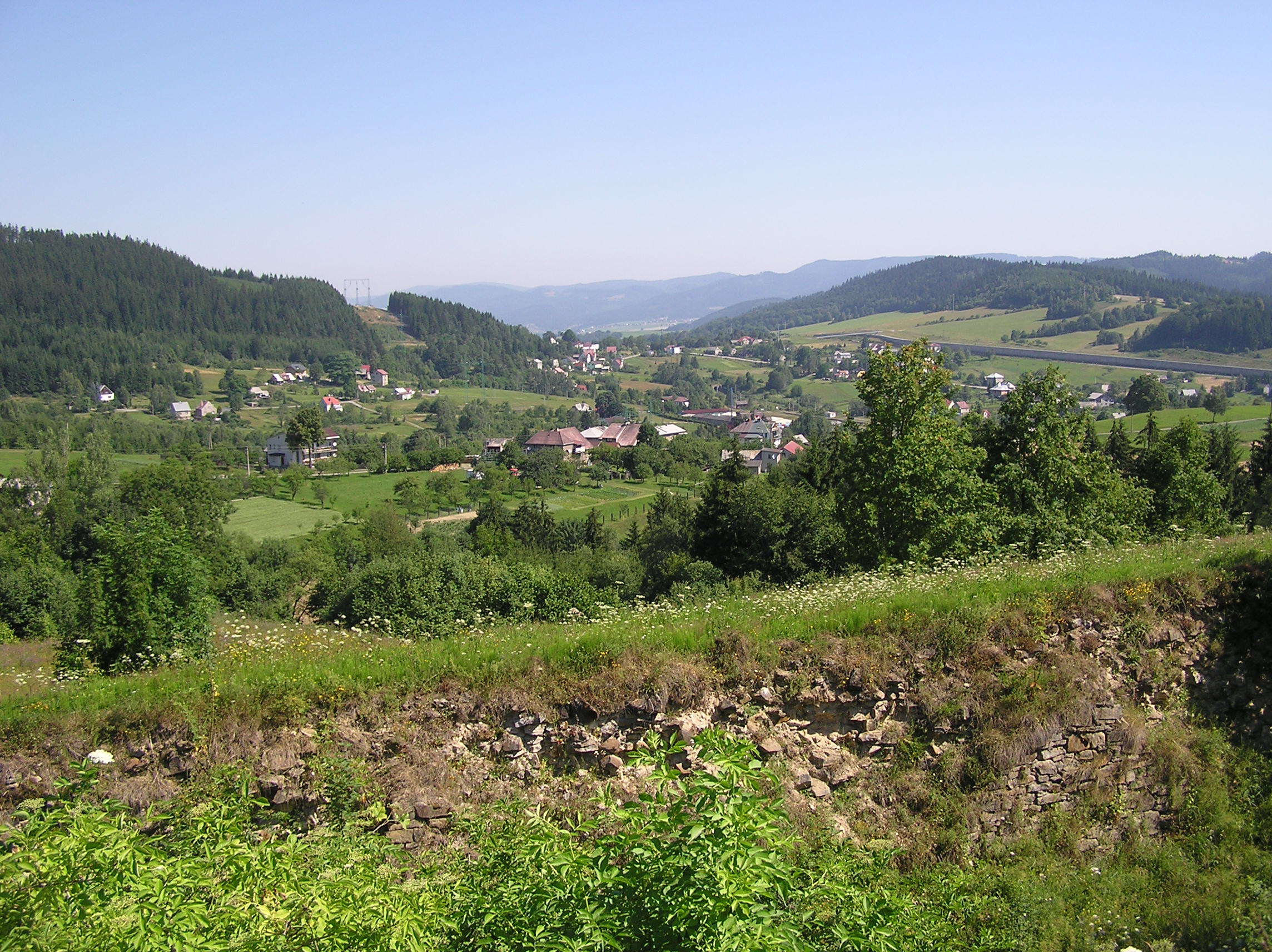
Jablunkov Pass seen from the old fortifications

Jabłonków incident (Polish: Incydent jabłonkowski, Czech: Jablunkovský incident) refers to the events of the night of 25–26 August 1939, along the Polish-Slovak border, when a group of German Abwehr agents attacked a rail station in Mosty. The main purpose of the attack was to capture the Jablunkov Pass, with its strategic railway tunnel, until the arrival of the German armed forces. The attackers were repelled by units of the Polish Army, and the incident is regarded as a prelude to the German invasion of Poland. The Jabłonków incident has been named the first commando operation of the Second World War.

== Prelude ==
According to Adolf Hitler's order, the invasion of Poland was planned for 4:25 a.m., on 26 August 1939. However, on 25 August, the attack was delayed because on that day Hitler learned that Britain had signed a new treaty with Poland, in which it promised military support if Poland was attacked.

Part of Germany's plan to invade Poland, Fall Weiss (Case White), involved small groups of Germans dressed in Räuberzivil ("robbers' civvies" - inconspicuous, rugged casual clothing) crossing the border the night before and seizing key strategic points before dawn on the day of the invasion. The secret Abwehr battalion detailed to undertake these operations was given the euphemistic title of "Construction Training Company 800 for Special Duties". A group under the command of Lieutenant Hans-Albrecht Herzner of Abwehrstelle Breslau, who later became commandant of the Nachtigall Battalion, the first foreign legion of the Wehrmacht, was instructed to prepare the way for the assault of the 7th Infantry Division by infiltrating the border. They were to capture a railway station at Mosty in the Jablunkov Pass in the Carpathian Mountains to prevent the destruction of the single-track railway tunnel which was the shortest connection between Warsaw and Vienna.

The Jablunkov Pass, which separates the mountain ranges of Moravian-Silesian Beskids and Silesian Beskids, is one of the most important transport routes in the Western Carpathians. In October 1938, together with the territory of Trans-Olza, it was annexed by the Second Polish Republic; therefore, Poland controlled a key railroad connection, the Košice-Bohumín railway line. The rail tunnel and the station at Jabłonków are part of the line. The Germans knew that failure to capture the line and the tunnel would seriously affect Wehrmacht movements in southern Poland.

== Attack ==
The task of the Abwehr detachment under Herzner was to capture both the rail station at Mosty and the strategic tunnel to prevent its destruction by Polish forces. It was ordered to occupy the Jablunkov Pass before actual hostilities started. The Germans were ordered to disable possible Polish demolition systems and make way for the 7th Infantry Division from Munich, stationed nearby.

Polish Army headquarters were fully aware of the strategic importance of the tunnel and it was mined as early as June 1939 by soldiers of the 21st Sapper Battalion from Bielsko, under reserve Colonel Witold Pirszel, who was a mining engineer. The tunnel was guarded by soldiers of the local post of the Border Guard from the village of Svrčinovec, and an infantry platoon of the 4th Regiment of Podhale Rifles. The nearest National Defence outpost was stationed in Třinec. In the summer of 1939, every day after the last train, Polish sappers armed the explosives for the night on both sides of the 300-metre long tunnel.

The German detachment of some 70 agents dressed in civilian clothes (some sources put the number at 24), set off from Čadca on 25 August late in the evening. During the night, they crossed the Polish-Slovak border near the mountain of Velký Polom and reached the station at Mosty at around 04:00 on 26 August unaware that Hitler had cancelled his order and delayed the attack on Poland until 1 September. The Germans set up positions on a hill near Mosty station and began shooting at the station building, as well as at a house where the principal of a local Polish school lived. In the following minutes, the Germans captured the station after some fighting, and took prisoner a group of workers on their way to the Třinec Iron and Steel Works. The German unit had no idea that the station was equipped with a military communication system, located in the basement. A female telephonist managed to call Polish units guarding the tunnel, and the alarm was raised. Polish sentries armed with machine guns took positions at both ends of the tunnel and an observation post was established. A chaotic exchange of fire took place after which the Germans realised that the operation was a failure and scattered in the nearby woods. Some attackers managed to capture a locomotive and tried to enter the tunnel, but were repelled by Polish police. The Germans remained under heavy fire, while trying to withdraw to Slovakia. They finally managed to withdraw at around midday on 26 August, with two wounded. Polish historian Tomasz Chinciński of the Institute of National Remembrance accepts that while the Germans captured the station at Mosty, he claims that the Germans did not manage to capture the tunnel.

== Aftermath ==
After the incident, German Generalmajor Eugen Ott, commander of the 7th Infantry Division, which was concentrated in the area of Žilina, apologised to Polish General Józef Kustroń, commander of the 21st Mountain Infantry Division, stationed nearby and responsible for border protection. Ott claimed that the action had been staged by an "insane" individual, who was acting on his own.

The tunnel in Jabłonków was blown up by Colonel Witold Pirszel on 1 September 1939, at 06:00, 75 minutes after the German army started attacking Poland (undeclared war) and a few minutes before German troops arrived. Rail communication was partially reintroduced in February 1940, and in total in 1941.

The incident provided the Polish Armed Forces with a warning that an invasion was likely imminent, causing the Polish government to quietly begin accelerating mobilization efforts. A full scale mobilization was not yet initiated due to fears of provoking the Germans and potentially angering Britain and France. The Polish Air Force would disperse most of its operational aircraft to secondary airfields leaving only trainers and non-operating aircraft at their normal bases. As a consequence the Luftwaffe would bomb mostly empty airfields on the first couple days of the war.

== See also ==
- Operation Himmler
- Gleiwitz incident
- Tarnów rail station bomb attack
- Brandenburgers
- Selbstschutz
