= Jablunkov Pass =

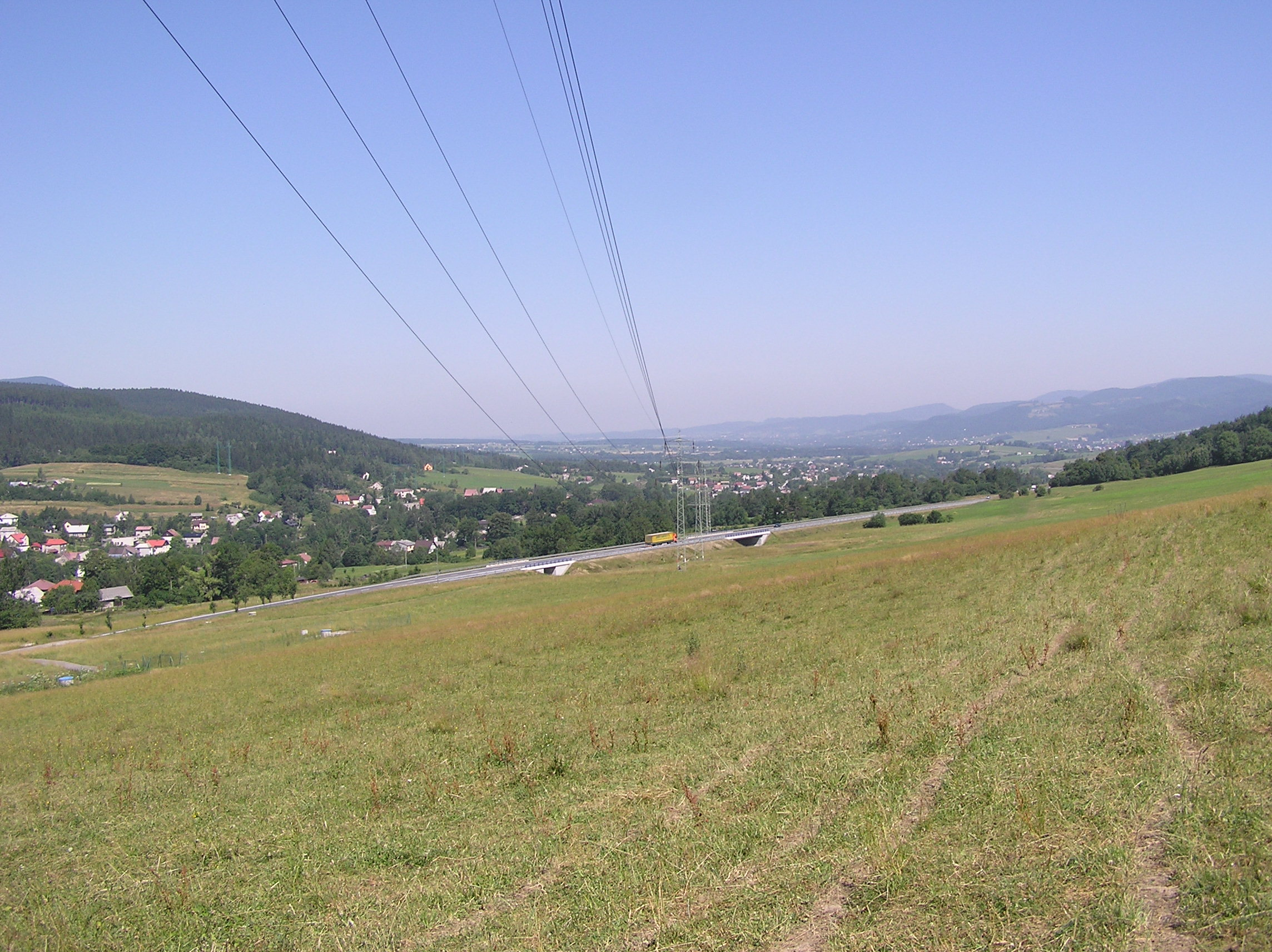
- Jablunkov Pass seen from the southern slopes of Girová mountain, looking northwest
- Interactive map of Jablunkov Pass
- Elevation: 553 metres (1,814 ft)
- Traversed by: European route E75

Third Approach
- Location: Mosty u Jablunkova, Czech Republic
- Range: Moravian-Silesian Beskids, Silesian Beskids
- Coordinates: 49.51667°N 18.75°E

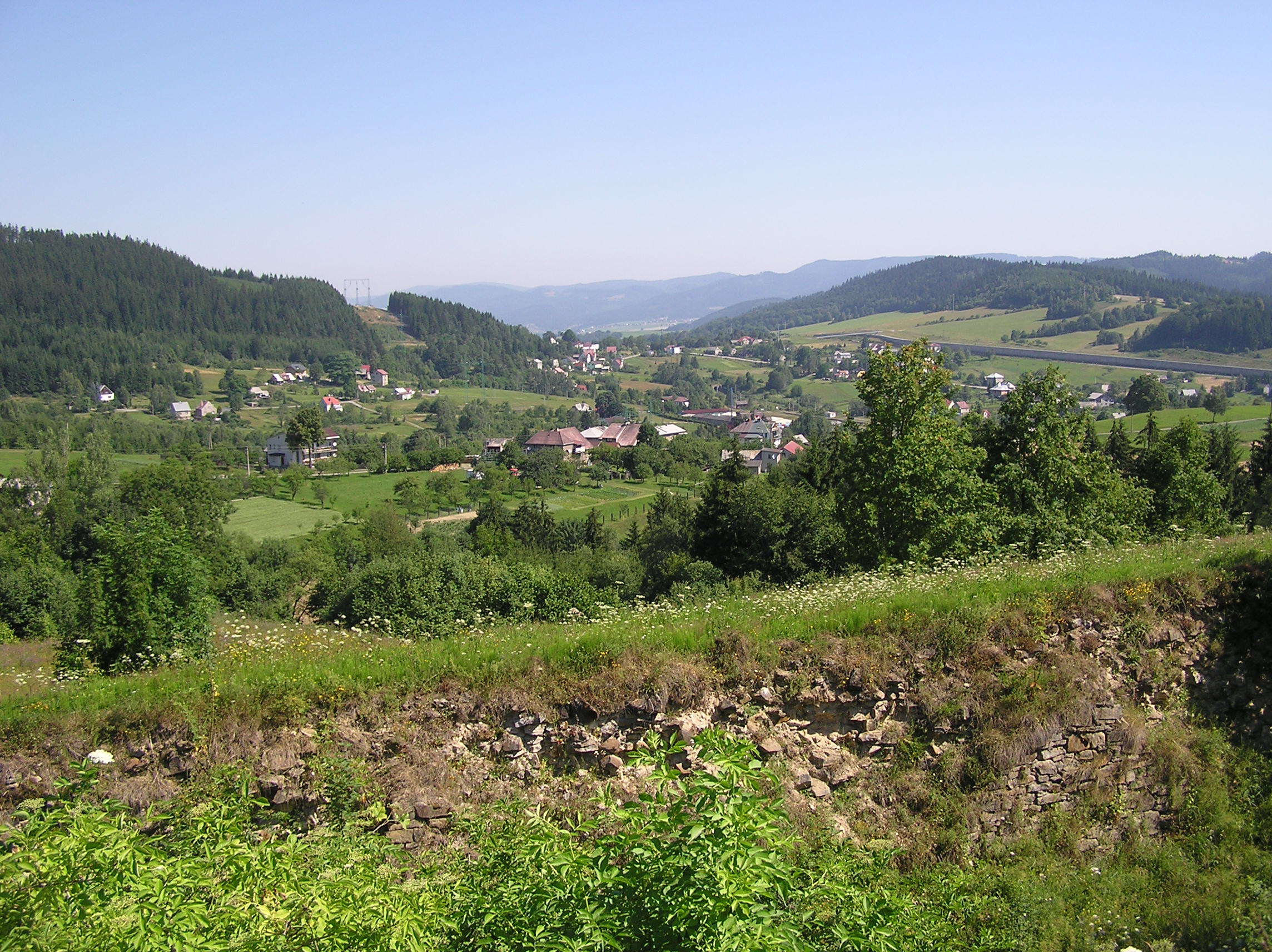
Jablunkov Pass seen from the old fortifications

Jablunkov Pass (Czech: Jablunkovský průsmyk, Polish: Przełęcz Jabłonkowska) is a mountain pass in the Western Beskids at 553 metres (1,814 ft) above sea level. It is located in the municipality of Mosty u Jablunkova in the Czech Republic, near the border with Poland and Slovakia.

== Geography ==
The pass separates the Moravian-Silesian Beskids and the Jablunkov Intermontane mountain ranges. In a broader sense, it separates the Moravian-Silesian Beskids and the Silesian Beskids.

== Transport ==
The pass is one of the most important transport routes in the Western Carpathians. The E75 road from Žilina to Český Těšín runs here. The Košice–Bohumín Railway also runs here. It was an important route from the Middle Ages, connecting Upper Hungary with Cieszyn Silesia.

== History ==
Archaeological researches suggest it was an important route long before the Middle Ages. Travelling caravans were frequently attacked by bandits, so some fortifications were built in the place of today's Mosty u Jablunkova. Archaeologists presume they were built in the 13th century. Importance of this trade route grew over time and in 1529 in the fear of Turkish attack, new fortifications were built. It played an important role during the Thirty Years' War. After war it was renovated and new larger one were built nearby by Duchess Elizabeth Lucretia. It eventually became a station with permanent garrison. Fortifications were last time renovated in 1808. It dilapidated from that time and locals picked up its parts as a construction material. Remains of this fortifications are today a popular tourist spot.

In October 1938 the whole Trans-Olza area, including this mountain pass, was captured by Poland. On the night of 25–26 August 1939, the Jabłonków Incident occurred here, when a group of armed German Abwehr agents of the Brandenburg Regiment attacked the rail station in Mosty. The Jabłonków Incident has been named the first commando operation of World War II.
