= Tarnów railway station bombing =

Bombing of railway station in Poland leading up to World War II

Coordinates: 50°00′20″N 20°58′26″E

- Part of Nazi terrorist attacks preceding invasion of Poland
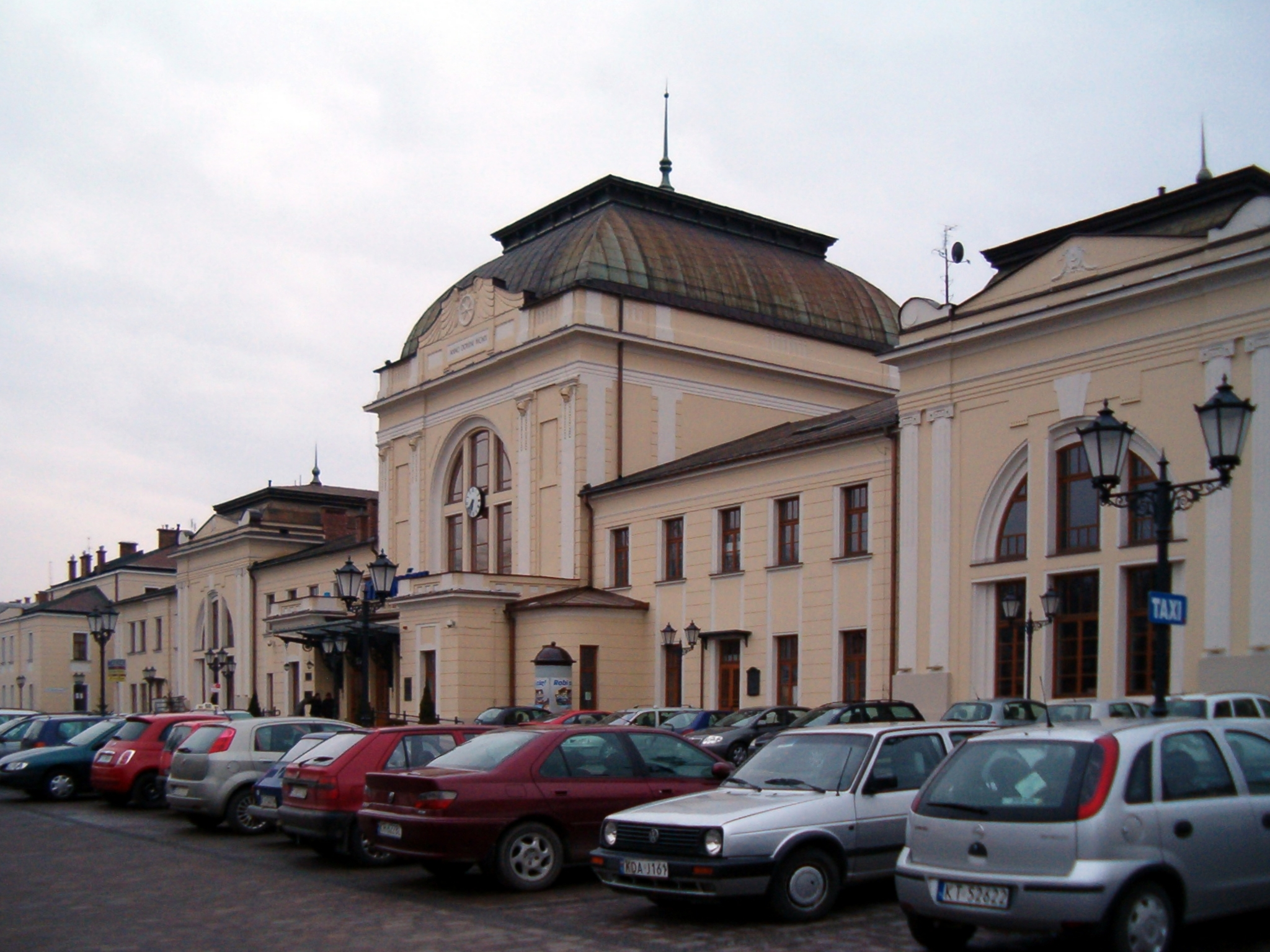
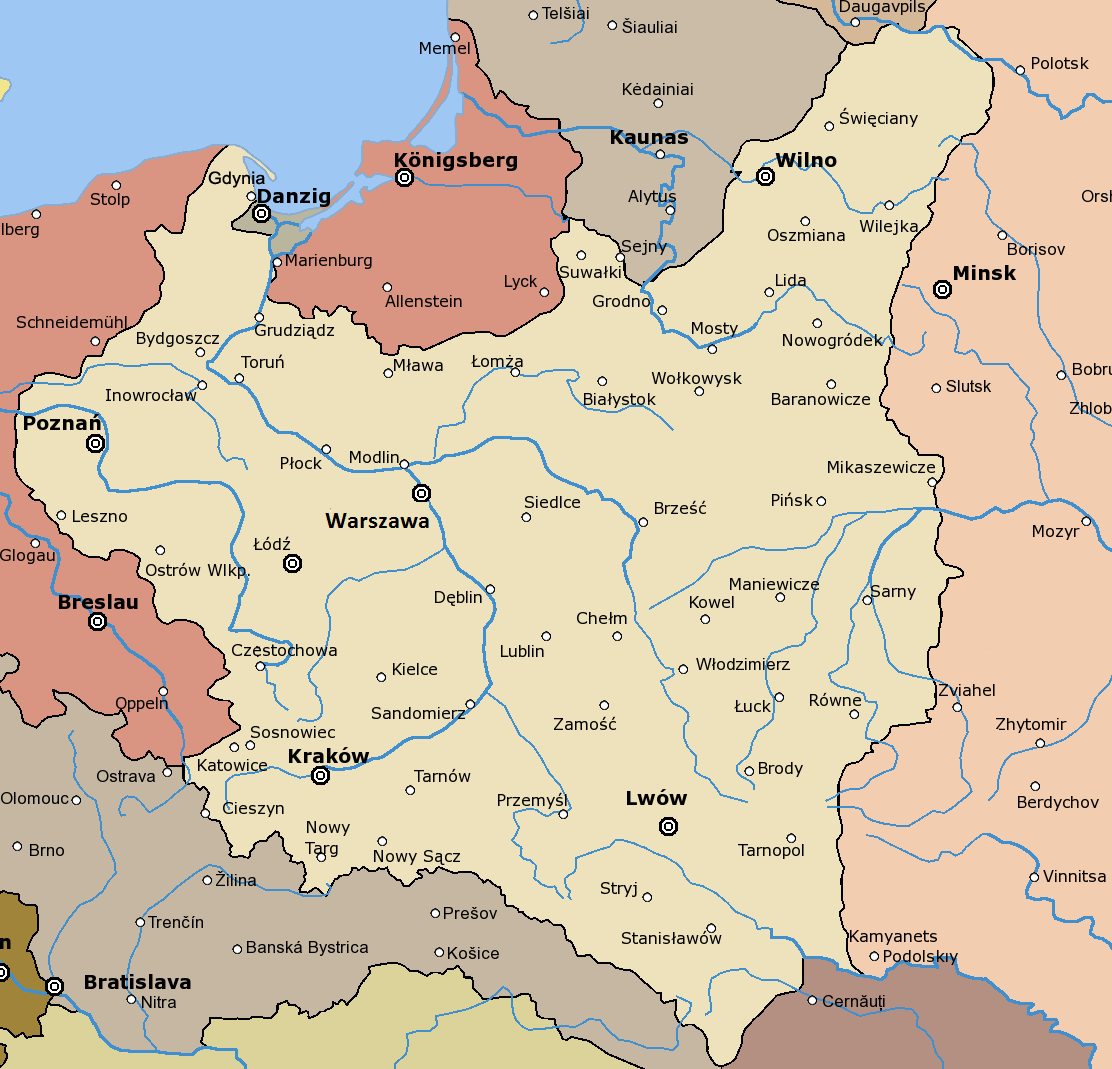
- Approximately a third of the train station collapsed due to the bombing. Location of Tarnów in the interwar period

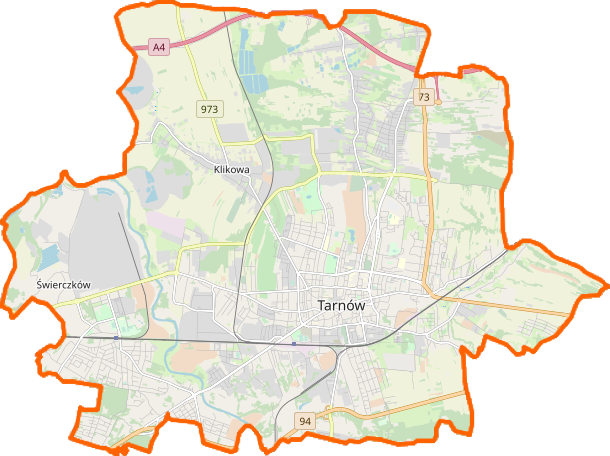
- Tarnów train station (Tarnów)
- Location: Tarnów railway station, Tarnów
- Date: 28 August 1939; 23:18
- Weapon: Two time bombs hidden in suitcases
- Deaths: 20
- Injuries: 35
- Perpetrator: Antoni Guzy

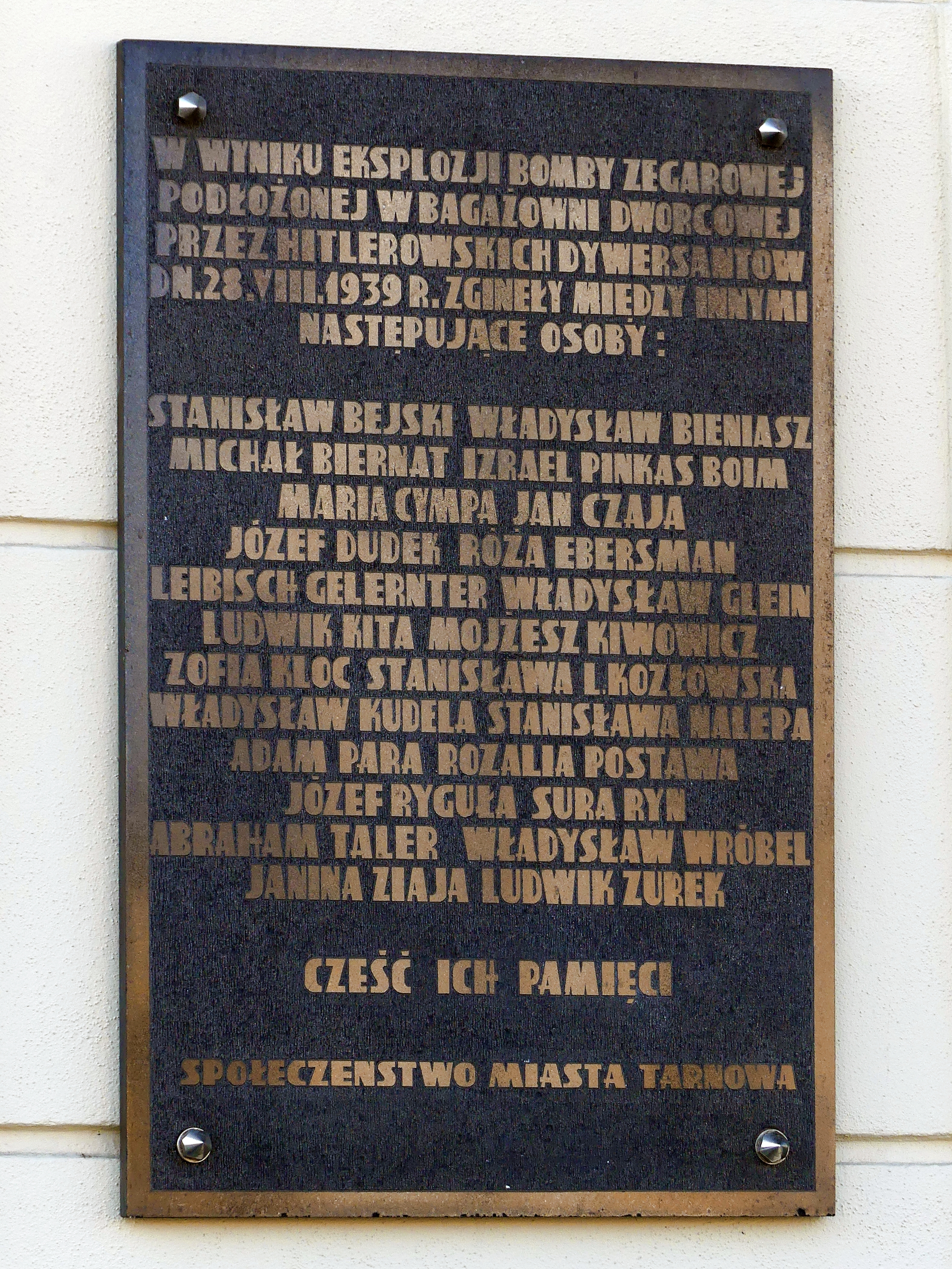
Commemorative plaque to the victims of the bombing

The Tarnów railway station bombing was a deadly bombing carried out by a German saboteur two days before the outbreak of World War II in Europe. The bombing occurred at Tarnów railway station in the city of Tarnów, Poland during the interwar period, and preceded the joint invasion of Poland by Nazi Germany and the Soviet Union. A time bomb detonated inside the station on the night of 28 August 1939, resulting in the deaths of 20–22 people and injuries to 35 or so others.

In 1939, Tarnów had a population of approximately 40,000. Tarnów Główny (Tarnów Central), a busy train station, was located on the railway line connecting Kraków to the west and Lwów to the east, two major cities in southern Poland. Many trains carrying thousands of passengers passed through Tarnów regularly. The growing threat of conflict with Germany added to the crowds, as many army reserve soldiers were ordered to report to their units amid worsening international tensions. At 11:18 p.m., the dense traffic abruptly stopped when a time bomb planted by a German saboteur named Anton Guzy exploded in the waiting hall. Twenty people died instantly. Some commentators argue that this event marked the beginning of the Second World War.

== Attack ==
The saboteur who planted the bomb, Antoni "Anton" Guzy from Bielsko (formerly Bielitz), was the son of a German mother and a Polish father. Guzy, who worked as a locksmith, joined the Gewerkschaft Deutscher Arbeiter, a local organization that facilitated job opportunities in Germany, after he found himself unemployed in 1938.

It is likely that he was convinced to carry out the attack by this agency. Guzy traveled to Tarnów, a Polish town located just over the border from the German city of Gleiwitz, with a man named Neumann. He left two suitcases filled with explosives in the luggage hall and proceeded to a platform to wait for the arrival of a Luxtorpeda train from Krynica, which passed through Tarnów on its way to Kraków. The scheduled departure time was 11:02 p.m. There is speculation that Guzy may not have known when the bomb would detonate. Before the explosion, he drank a beer at the station's restaurant and took a stroll around the station. When the explosion occurred, Guzy and other passengers fled in panic. It is believed that his German handlers may have intended for him to die in the attack.

The number of casualties would have been much higher if a train from Kraków had not arrived eight minutes late. In addition, a military transport carrying several soldiers had left Tarnów station just moments before the attack. About one-third of the station building was destroyed. Rail workers and policemen spent hours searching for victims in the rubble.

Reconstructing all the details of the attack is impossible. At 11:30 a.m., Guzy met a man named Neuman from Skoczów, who was allegedly affiliated with a German saboteur organization. They traveled together by rail to Kraków, departing from Bielsko-Biała station at 12:13 p.m. In Kraków, they stopped for coffee and then retrieved two large suitcases from the station's luggage office. According to Guzy's testimony, Neuman told him to deposit both cases at the Tarnów station and then return to Kraków, where Neuman would be waiting for him. After the explosion, Guzy was stopped by the railroad police who asked for his identity papers before releasing him. When he was stopped again near the station, he was identified as the person who had abandoned the suitcases. During the interrogation that followed, he expressed remorse and claimed that he had never received any money. His subsequent fate is uncertain. A German investigation conducted in 1941 concluded that Guzy was shot in early September 1939, before the invading Germans had reached the area.

Fourteen people died in the immediate attack, and 38 were wounded; eight died subsequently. No clear motive was ever established. It is thought that the attack may have been intended to incite anger against Germans in Poland as part of the wider campaign of sabotage, therefore providing justification for the Nazi invasion (that was eventually provided by the false flag Gleiwitiz incident).

== See also ==
- Gleiwitz incident
- Jabłonków incident
- Selbstschutz
