= Mosty u Jablunkova =

Mosty u Jablunkova Mosty koło Jabłonkowa
- Municipality
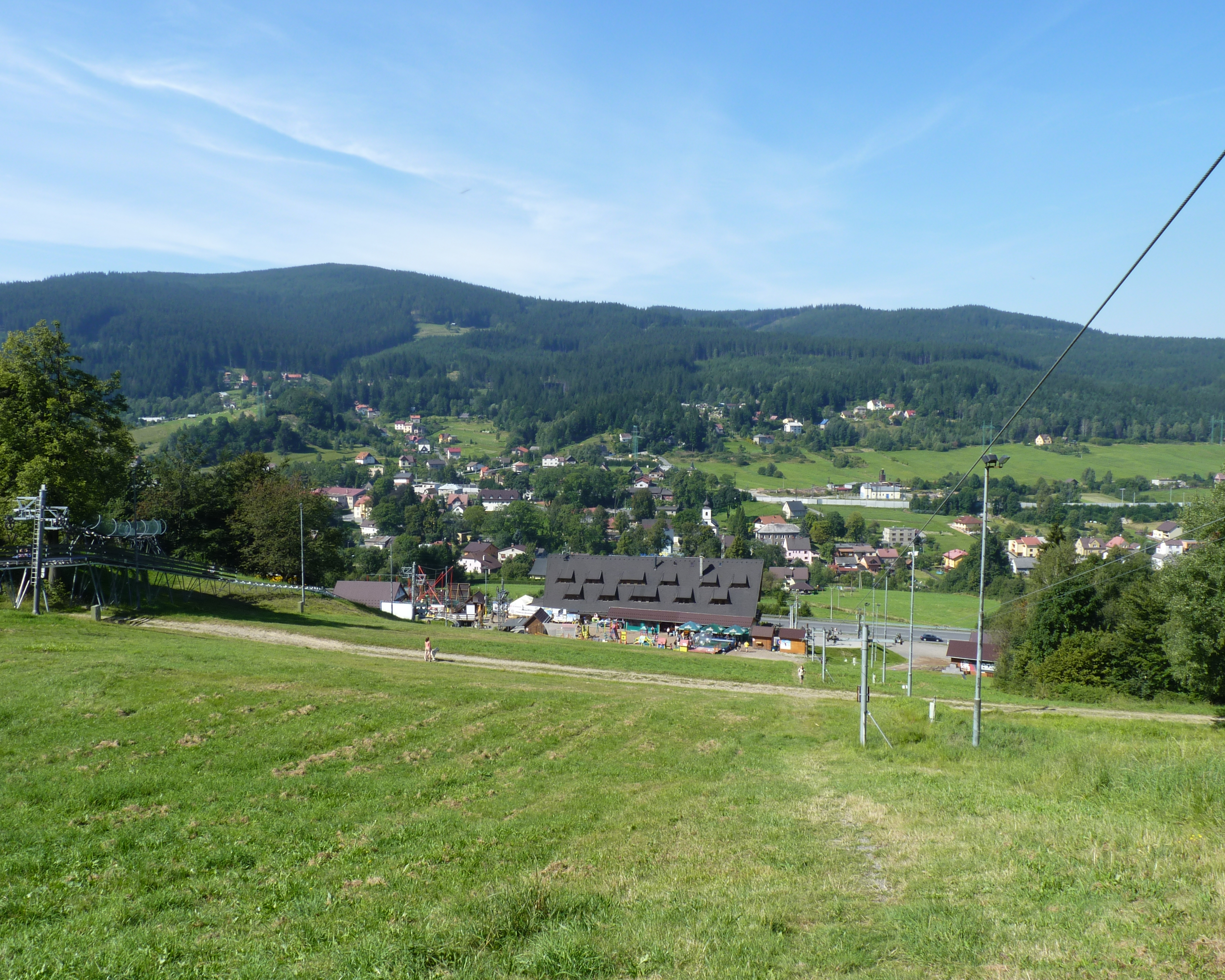
- General view

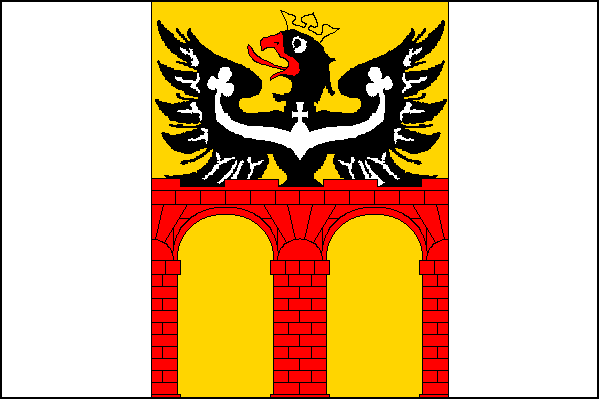
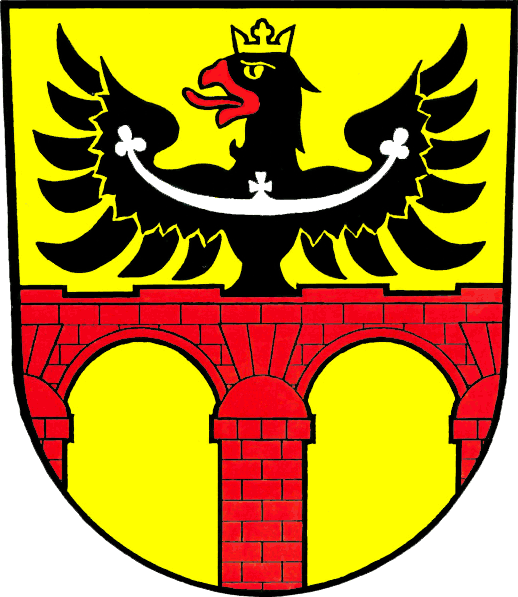
- Flag Coat of arms

- Location in the Czech Republic
- Coordinates: 49°31′38″N 18°45′15″E
- Country: Czech Republic
- Region: Moravian-Silesian
- District: Frýdek-Místek
- First mentioned: 1577

Area
  - Total: 33.92 km^{2} (13.10 sq mi)
- Elevation: 490 m (1,610 ft)

Population (2026-01-01)
  - Total: 3,667
  - Density: 108.1/km^{2} (280.0/sq mi)
- Time zone: UTC+1 (CET)
  - Summer (DST): UTC+2 (CEST)
- Postal code: 739 98
- Website: www.mostyujablunkova.cz

Mosty u Jablunkova (Czech pronunciation: [ˈmostɪ ˈu jabluŋkova]; until 1949 Mosty; Polish: Mosty koło Jabłonkowa, German: Mosty bei Jablunkau) is a municipality and village in Frýdek-Místek District in the Moravian-Silesian Region of the Czech Republic. It has about 3,700 inhabitants. The municipality has a significant Polish minority.

== Etymology ==
The name literally means 'bridges near Jablunkov' in Czech. It is connected with an ancient trade route passing through swamps and marshes in today's territory of the village. They were bridged by wooden beams and logs by the so-called mostors or mościorze, which gave the village its name.

== Geography ==
Mosty u Jablunkova is located about 33 kilometres (21 mi) southeast of Frýdek-Místek and 46 km (29 mi) southeast of Ostrava. It lies in the historical region of Cieszyn Silesia on the border with Slovakia. The village is located in the Jablunkov Pass. The western half of the municipality lies in the Moravian-Silesian Beskids, the eastern part extends to the Jablunkov Intermontane region, and the northern part extends to the Jablunkov Furrow. The highest point is a contour line below the top of the mountain Severka at 945 m (3,100 ft) above sea level.

== History ==
The first written mention of Mosty u Jablunkova is from 1577 as Mosty Jablunkowske. It belonged to the Duchy of Teschen. The village was founded between 1545 and 1577, during the reign of Duke Wenceslaus III Adam.

After Revolutions of 1848 in the Austrian Empire a modern municipal division was introduced in the re-established Austrian Silesia. The village as a municipality was subscribed to the political district of Teschen and the legal district of Jablunkau. According to the censuses conducted in 1880–1910 the population of the municipality grew from 1,959 in 1880 to 2,318 in 1910 with a majority being native Polish-speakers (growing from 98% in 1880 to 98.5% in 1910) accompanied by German-speaking (at most 2% in 1880) and Czech-speaking people (at most 0.3% in 1900). In terms of religion in 1910 the majority were Roman Catholics (98.6%), followed by Protestants (1.1%) and Jews (6 people).

After World War I, Polish–Czechoslovak War and the division of Cieszyn Silesia in 1920, it became a part of Czechoslovakia. Following the Munich Agreement, in October 1938 together with the Trans-Olza region it was annexed by Poland, administratively adjoined to Cieszyn County of Silesian Voivodeship.

The municipality was annexed by Nazi Germany at the beginning of World War II. On 25–26 August 1939, a group of German Abwehr armed agents attacked the rail station in Mosty. The incident became known as Jabłonków incident. After the war, the municipality was restored to Czechoslovakia.

== Demographics ==
According to the 2021 Census, Polish minority makes up 13.3% of the population.

Historical population

Year	Pop.	±%
1869	2,346	—
1880	1,959	−16.5%
1890	1,941	−0.9%
1900	2,193	+13.0%
1910	2,318	+5.7%

Year	Pop.	±%
1921	2,601	+12.2%
1930	3,076	+18.3%
1950	3,358	+9.2%
1961	3,880	+15.5%
1970	4,017	+3.5%

Year	Pop.	±%
1980	4,126	+2.7%
1991	3,971	−3.8%
2001	3,997	+0.7%
2011	3,830	−4.2%
2021	3,662	−4.4%

Source: Censuses

== Transport ==
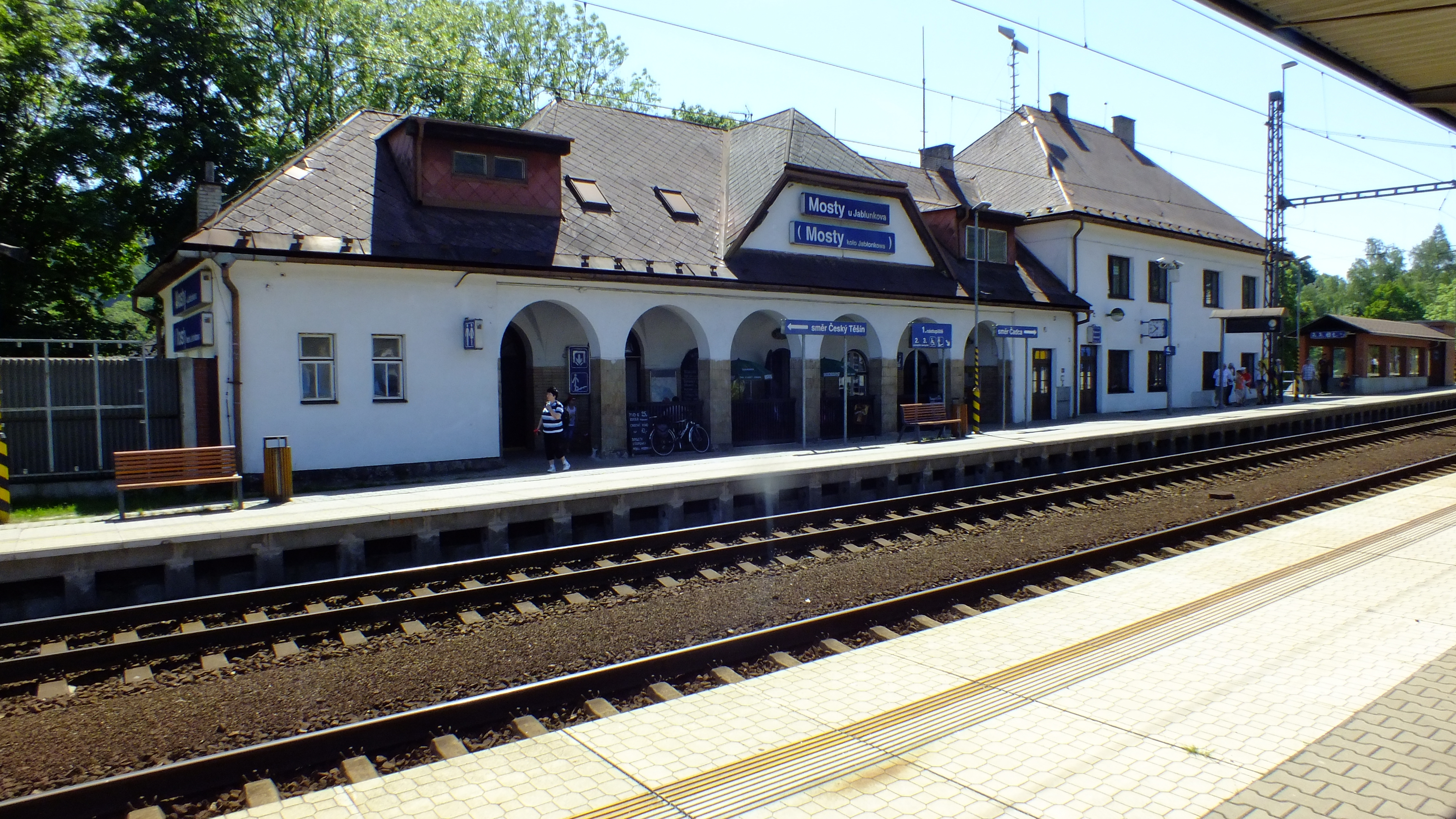
Railway station

The I/11 road (part of the European route E75) runs through Mosty u Jablunkova and continues to Slovakia. There are the Mosty u Jablunkova / Čadca road and railway border crossings. The second road border crossing is Šance / Čadca-Milošová

Mosty u Jablunkova is located on the railway line Ostrava–Třinec–Mosty u Jablunkova. The municipality is served by two train stations.

== Sport ==
There is a ski resort with four pistes in the municipality.

In Mosty u Jablunkova is a small aquapark operated by the municipality.

== Sights ==
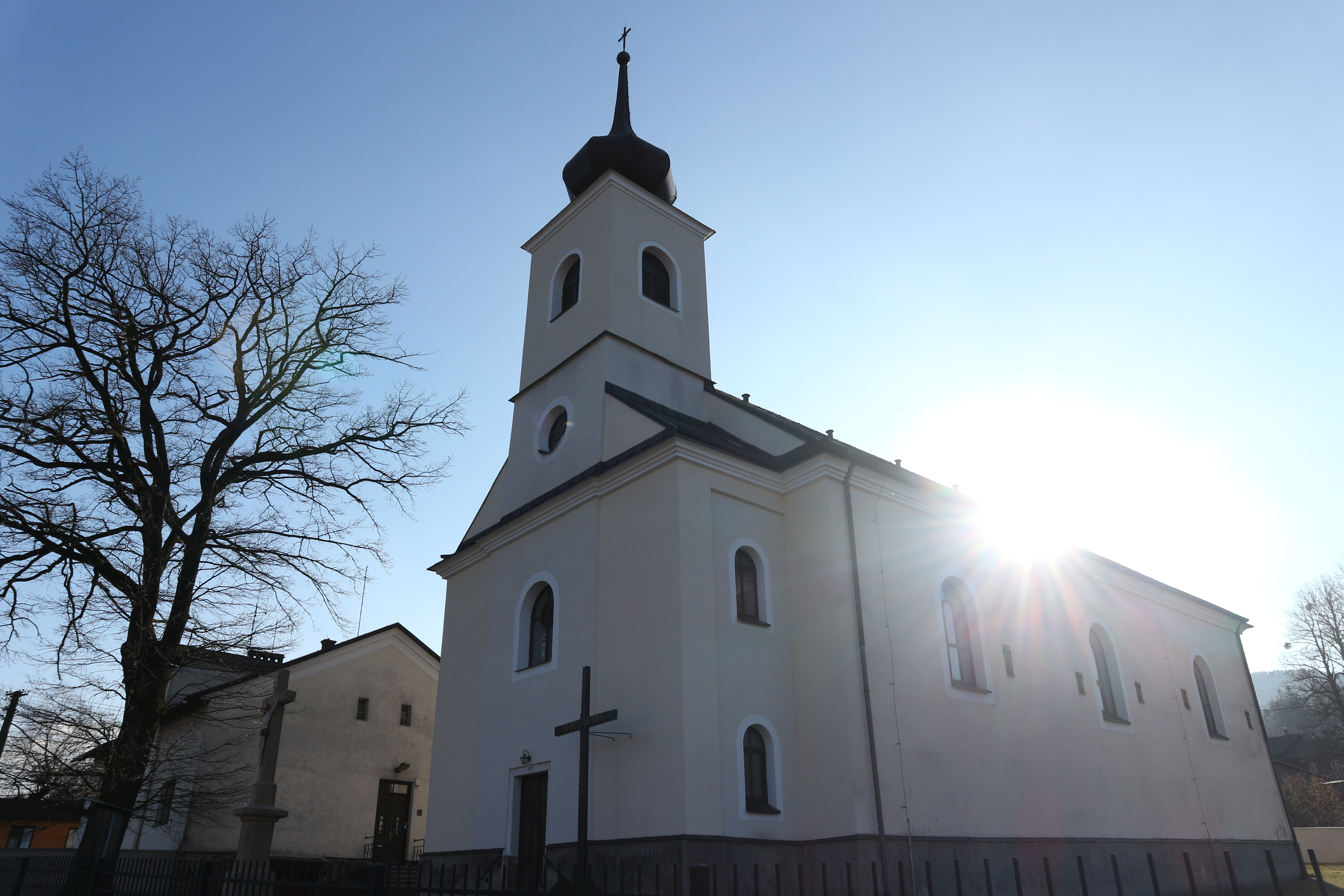
Church of Saint Hedwig

The main historical landmark is the Church of Saint Hedwig. It was built in 1785–1787.

Velká Šance was a part of a unique fortification system built in the 16th–19th centuries which was to prevent the enemy from passing through the Jablunkov Pass. To this day, only the moats with ramparts, the defensive moat and the remains of the walls of the original fortifications have been preserved. There is a visitor centre with exhibitions on the functioning of fortifications and about the weapons of the then crew.

== Notable people ==
- Franciszek Pokorny (1891–1966), Polish Army officer
