= July 1939 =

Month of 1939

<<	July 1939					>>
Su	Mo	Tu	We	Th	Fr	Sa
						1
2	3	4	5	6	7	8
9	10	11	12	13	14	15
16	17	18	19	20	21	22
23	24	25	26	27	28	29
30	31

The following events occurred in July 1939:

== July 1, 1939 (Saturday) ==
- The Irish Red Cross was formally established.
- Born: Delaney Bramlett, musician, in Pontotoc, Mississippi (d. 2008)
- Died: Louis Davids, 55, Dutch cabaretier and revue artist

== July 2, 1939 (Sunday) ==
- The Japanese launched a new offensive in the Battles of Khalkhin Gol, invading Mongolia with a force of 38,000 men.
- The 1st World Science Fiction Convention opened in New York in conjunction with the World's Fair.

== July 3, 1939 (Monday) ==
- Neville Chamberlain informed the House of Commons that the government had received reliable reports that "intensive measures of a military character" were taking place in Danzig.

== July 4, 1939 (Tuesday) ==
- Lou Gehrig, forced to retire after being diagnosed with ALS, made a farewell speech at Yankee Stadium on a day named in his honor. Gehrig said he considered himself "the luckiest man on the face of the earth." Gehrig's Yankees #4 is the first team number in Major League Baseball history to be retired. "
- The Daily Telegraph began a campaign to give Winston Churchill a position in the British cabinet. The News Chronicle, The Yorkshire Post, The Observer and Picture Post would join the campaign.
- The Reichsvereinigung der Juden in Deutschland (Reich Association of Jews in Germany) was established as the sole legal Jewish organization in Germany.
- A bodybuilding contest was held in Chicago, won by Roland Essmaker. Although similar events had been around for years, the fact that all entrants had to be registered with the Amateur Athletic Union provided an air of official recognition that had previously been absent from bodybuilding. The competition became an annual event with the winner earning the title of "Mr. America".
- The radio show Blondie, based on the comic strip of the same name, premiered on CBS.

== July 5, 1939 (Wednesday) ==
- The Japanese were beaten back across the Khalkhyn Gol.
- Thousands of Works Progress Administration workers went on strike in protest against longer work hours.
- 55 were killed by flash floods in Kentucky.
- Born: Booker Edgerson, American football player, in Baxter County, Arkansas.

== July 6, 1939 (Thursday) ==
- McDonnell Aircraft was founded by James Smith McDonnell.
- Born: Jet Harris, bassist of the Shadows, in Kingsbury, North London, England (d. 2011)

== July 7, 1939 (Friday) ==
- Hashim al-Atassi resigned as President of Syria in protest against the French cession of the Republic of Hatay to Turkey. The French appointed Bahij al-Khatib to succeed him as Head of State.
- Dick Burton of England won the Open Championship.
- Bobby Riggs defeated fellow American Elwood Cooke in the Gentlemen's Singles final at Wimbledon.
- The automotive company SeAZ was founded in the Soviet Union.
- The French comedy-drama film The Rules of the Game directed by Jean Renoir premiered in Paris.
- Died: Deacon White, 91, American baseball player

== July 8, 1939 (Saturday) ==
- Alice Marble of the United States defeated Kay Stammers of the United Kingdom in the Ladies' Singles final at Wimbledon.
- The southern third of England (excepting London) was darkened for an air raid test.
- Shining One won the 2nd annual Hollywood Derby.
- Died: Havelock Ellis, 80, English physician, writer and sexologist

== July 9, 1939 (Sunday) ==
- Thousands of Nazis held rallies in Danzig. District Leader Albert Forster declared he was confident that Hitler would "liberate" the city and demanded that Poland give up privileges of storing arms in a munitions depot on the Westerplatte.
- Hermann Paul Müller of Germany won the French Grand Prix.

== July 10, 1939 (Monday) ==
- In Francoist Spain, Julián Besteiro was sentenced to thirty years imprisonment for aiding rebellion.
- Len Harvey defeated Jock McAvoy at White City Stadium in London to win the British light heavyweight boxing title.
- Born: Mavis Staples, singer, actress and civil rights activist, in Chicago, Illinois

== July 11, 1939 (Tuesday) ==
- The U.S. Foreign Relations Committee voted 12–11 to defer discussion of revising the Neutrality Act until the next session, scheduled for January 1940. This was a defeat for President Roosevelt, who wanted to repeal the clause that placed an embargo on trade with belligerents, but isolationism in the Senate was strong.
- The American League beat the National League 3–1 in the 7th Major League Baseball All-Star Game at Yankee Stadium.

== July 12, 1939 (Wednesday) ==
- Dino Grandi was recalled as Italy's ambassador to London. The British government was snubbed by not being given any formal notification.
- The Trinidad and Tobago Red Cross Society was founded.

== July 13, 1939 (Thursday) ==
- Two French newspaper executives were charged with espionage and taking money from the German government to publish defeatist propaganda.
- The swashbuckler film The Man in the Iron Mask starring Louis Hayward, Joan Bennett and Warren William was released.

== July 14, 1939 (Friday) ==
- President Roosevelt said that there could not be strikes against the government and that the present WPA strike was such action.
- Hundreds of British troops joined the French in Bastille Day parades marking the 150th anniversary of the Storming of the Bastille. It was the first time that Britain and France held military demonstrations together since the World War.
- Born: Karel Gott, Schlager singer, in Plzeň, Protectorate of Bohemia and Moravia (d. 2019); Sid Haig, actor, in Fresno, California (d. 2019); George Edgar Slusser, scholar, professor and writer, in San Francisco, California (d. 2014)
- Died: Alphonse Mucha, 78, Czech artist; Kate Ker-Lane, 78, English fashion designer and retailer

== July 15, 1939 (Saturday) ==
- Henry Picard won the 22nd PGA Championship.
- The Manila Broadcasting Company first went on the air in the Philippines as KZRH.
- "Stairway to the Stars" by Glenn Miller went to #1 on the American popular music charts as compiled by Your Hit Parade.
- Born: Aníbal Cavaco Silva, 19th President of Portugal, in Boliqueime

== July 16, 1939 (Sunday) ==
- British Fascist leader Sir Oswald Mosley gave a speech in the Earls Court Exhibition Centre attended by over 20,000 people. He presented a plan that he said would "bring peace in our time and our children's time" that called for a hands-off policy in Eastern Europe, disarmament in Western Europe, return of colonies to Germany and for the British Empire to concentrate on its own affairs. "Why is it a moral duty to go to war if a German kicks a Jew across the Polish frontier?" Mosley declared. "We are going, if the power lies within us ... to say that our generation and our children shall not die like rats in Polish holes."
- Born: Corin Redgrave, actor and political activist, in Marylebone, London, England (d. 2010)

== July 17, 1939 (Monday) ==
- Prime Minister Chamberlain declared in the House of Commons that the British government "would not and could not" reverse its policy in the Far East. The statement referred to reports of Japanese demands that such a reversal was necessary as a condition for opening negotiations on the Tientsin situation.
- Born: Milva, singer, actress and television personality, in Goro, Emilia–Romagna, Italy (d. 2021)

== July 18, 1939 (Tuesday) ==
- President Roosevelt met with key senators at the White House to explore the possibility of trying to revise the American neutrality policy once again. The president and Secretary of State Cordell Hull warned that a war in Europe was imminent, but the prominent Idaho senator William Borah replied, "I do not believe there is going to be any war in Europe between now and the first of January or for some time thereafter." Hull asked the senator to read State Department cables to understand the seriousness of the situation, but Borah responded that he not "give a damn about your dispatches" and claimed that he had better sources. The meeting ended with no new agreements.
- Born: Dion DiMucci, singer-songwriter, in the Bronx, New York

== July 19, 1939 (Wednesday) ==
- The SS Heimwehr Danzig reported the arrest of twenty "Marxists" they said were conspiring to bomb bridges and other buildings in the event of war between Germany and Poland.
- General Sir Archibald Wavell was made Commander-in-Chief of Middle East Command.
- A group of Royal Air Force bombers flew from London to Marseille and back as a demonstration of British air power. It was not lost on the public that the distance from London to Marseille was about the same as the distance from London to Berlin.

== July 20, 1939 (Thursday) ==
- Benito Mussolini announced a plan to break up large estates in Sicily, irrigate the land and resettle in addition to constructing new villages, houses and roads. If all went according to plan, Sicily's population would double in a decade to 8 or 9 million people.
- Born: Judy Chicago, artist, in Chicago

== July 21, 1939 (Friday) ==
- The Constitution of Slovakia was passed.
- Died: Ambroise Vollard, 73, French art dealer (car accident)

== July 22, 1939 (Saturday) ==
- HMS Thetis was raised seven weeks after its tragic sinking.
- The sixth congress of the Baptist World Alliance opened in Atlanta. More than 40,000 delegates (called 'messengers') sang and prayed on a baseball field in one of the largest religious assemblies ever held up to that time.

== July 23, 1939 (Sunday) ==
- Mahatma Gandhi wrote directly to Adolf Hitler, addressing him as "friend" and requesting that he refrain from starting a war "which may reduce humanity to the savage state." The letter never reached Hitler, as it was intercepted by the British government.
- Rudolf Caracciola won the German Grand Prix.

== July 24, 1939 (Monday) ==
- During the reading of a bill designed to crush IRA activities, Home Secretary Samuel Hoare announced the police discovery of an IRA document known as S-Plan. Hoare read excerpts from the document that included plans to sabotage airplane and munitions factories and damage supplies of water and electricity.
- British Prime Minister Neville Chamberlain informed the House of Commons that the government had reached an agreement with Japan that "the Japanese forces in China have special requirements for the purpose of safeguarding their own security and maintaining public order in regions under their control and that they have to suppress or remove any such acts or causes as will obstruct them or benefit their enemy." The British government, Chamberlain explained, had "no intention of countenancing any act or measures prejudicial to the attainment of the above-mentioned objects by Japanese forces." Chamberlain denied opposition suggestions that Britain was now on the side of Japan in its war against China.
- Born: Walt Bellamy, basketball player, in New Bern, North Carolina (d. 2013)

== July 25, 1939 (Tuesday) ==
- The Japanese consul at Canton informed other foreign consuls that the Canton River would be closed to foreign shipping for two weeks beginning at midnight tomorrow for military reasons.
- The Tuzigoot Site in Arizona was made a U.S. National Monument.
- Pax Ting, the first Girl Guide and Girl Scout World Camp, opened in Gödöllő, Hungary. 5,800 Girl Guides attended from around the world.

== July 26, 1939 (Wednesday) ==
- Five more bomb explosions occurred in England – two in London and three in Liverpool. One person was killed and twenty injured.
- The U.S. government gave Japan the necessary six months' notice that it was abrograting the 1911 Treaty of Commerce and Navigation between the two countries, explaining that the treaty contained "provisions which need new consideration."
- The Cuban Baseball Hall of Fame was inaugurated, six weeks after its American counterpart.
- Born: John Howard, 25th Prime Minister of Australia, in Earlwood, New South Wales; Bob Lilly, NFL defensive tackle, in Olney, Texas

== July 27, 1939 (Thursday) ==
- 40 houses in North London were raided in a hunt for IRA bombers.
- The Central Reserve Police Force was formed in India.
- Born: William Eggleston, photographer, in Memphis, Tennessee; Michael Longley, poet, in Belfast, Northern Ireland (d. 2025)

== July 28, 1939 (Friday) ==
- A bill permitting summary deportation of suspected IRA members was given Royal Assent. Home Secretary Samuel Hoare immediately made use of the law by signing deportation orders for nineteen Irishmen that same day.
- Died: Beryl Mercer, 56, Spanish-born American actress

== July 29, 1939 (Saturday) ==
- The French Council of Ministers extended the term of the Chamber of Deputies for two years until June 1, 1942, meaning there would not be an election in the fall as expected. The council also created a Commissariat of Information and named the famous writer Jean Giraudoux to be its head. The new office's purpose was "to support French national defense by organizing efficient diffusion of French information beyond the French frontier."

== July 30, 1939 (Sunday) ==
- Francisco Franco decreed that to help rebuild Spain, every able-bodied citizen must either perform 15 days of unpaid work for the state each year, or pay a cash sum equivalent to 15 days of work at their own job.
- 1939 American Karakoram expedition to K2 ended in tragedy when Dudley Wolfe and three Sherpa people sent to rescue him died high on the mountain.
- Sylvère Maes of Belgium won the Tour de France. It was the last Tour until 1947.
- Died: Sir Charles Blair Gordon, 71, Canadian industrialist and banker, president of the Bank of Montreal

== July 31, 1939 (Monday) ==
- Britain and France announced that military talks would be opening in Moscow to negotiate a pact with the Soviet Union.
- Dudley Pound was made Britain's Admiral of the Fleet.
- Born: Susan Flannery, soap opera actress, in Jersey City, New Jersey; France Nuyen, actress, in Marseille, France; Ignacio Zoco, footballer, in Garde, Spain (d. 2015)
