= March 1939 =

Month of 1939

<<	March 1939					>>
Su	Mo	Tu	We	Th	Fr	Sa
			1	2	3	4
5	6	7	8	9	10	11
12	13	14	15	16	17	18
19	20	21	22	23	24	25
26	27	28	29	30	31

The following events occurred in March 1939:

== March 1, 1939 (Wednesday) ==
- A munitions dump exploded in Hirakata, Osaka, Japan. Early estimates put the dead at over 200 people and almost 500 wounded.
- The Papal conclave to elect a new pope began.
- The drama film The Little Princess starring Shirley Temple premiered at Grauman's Chinese Theatre in Hollywood.
- Born: Leo Brouwer, composer and guitarist, in Havana, Cuba

== March 2, 1939 (Thursday) ==
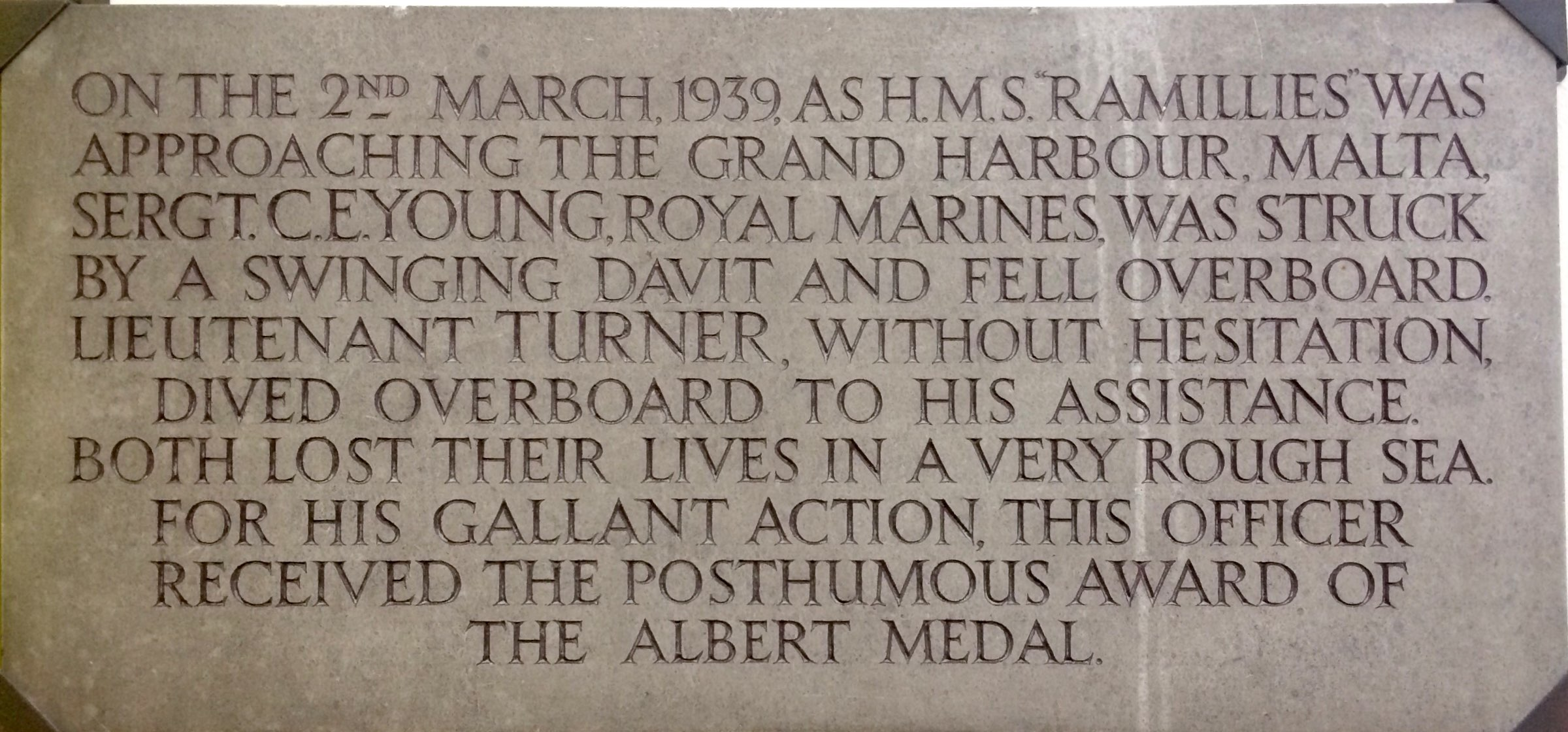

- Cardinal Secretary of State Eugenio Maria Giuseppe Giovanni Pacelli was elected the new pope. He took the name of Pius XII.
- France named 82-year-old Philippe Pétain as the ambassador to Francoist Spain.
- A book titled The Strange Death of Adolf Hitler was published in the United States, immediately drawing worldwide attention. Written anonymously, the book claimed that high officials within the Nazi Party assassinated Hitler the night before the Munich Conference by arranging for his omelette to be poisoned. The book claimed that Hitler was now being impersonated by body doubles. The book was made into a film of the same name in 1943.
- Died: Howard Carter, 64, English archaeologist

== March 3, 1939 (Friday) ==
- Nazi Germany issued twelve commandments for the country's health. Among them were abstinence of youth from alcohol and tobacco, abstinence from drinking and driving and physical exercise for the entire nation. Hitler Youth leader Baldur von Schirach presented Adolf Hitler, who neither smoked nor drank alcohol, as a role model for all Germans to follow.
- Mahatma Gandhi began a fast in favour of administrative reform.
- Born: Bill Frindall, cricket scorer and statistician, in Epsom, Surrey, England (d. 2009)

== March 4, 1939 (Saturday) ==
- The Cartagena Uprising began.
- Hedy Lamarr and Gene Markey eloped in Mexico.
- "Deep Purple" by Bess Wain & Larry Clinton topped the American pop charts as compiled by Your Hit Parade.
- Born: Jack Fisher, baseball player, in Frostburg, Maryland; Carlos Vereza, actor, in Rio de Janeiro, Brazil

== March 5, 1939 (Sunday) ==
- Segismundo Casado conducted a coup against the Juan Negrín government and formed the National Defense Council.
- In Cartagena, the Spanish destroyer Sánchez Barcáiztegui was bombed by the Nationalists and severely damaged.
- Born: Benyamin Sueb, comedian, actor and singer, in Batavia, Dutch East Indies (d. 1995)
- Died: Herbert Mundin, 40, English actor (auto accident)

== March 6, 1939 (Monday) ==
- United Automobile Workers amended its constitution to bar communists and any other advocates of totalitarianism from union offices and future membership.
- Born: Cookie Rojas, baseball player, in Havana, Cuba
- Died: Patriarch Miron of Romania, 70, Romanian cleric and politician

== March 7, 1939 (Tuesday) ==
- The Cartagena Uprising was suppressed. The merchant steamship Castillo de Olite carrying over 2,000 Nationalist troops was sunk by shore batteries.
- Armand Călinescu became Prime Minister of Romania.
- Gandhi ended his four-day fast and accepted an invitation from Viceroy of India the Marquess of Linlithgow to attend a political conference in New Delhi.

== March 8, 1939 (Wednesday) ==
- Generalissimo Francisco Franco declared a total blockade of all remaining Republican-held ports. All ships entering the three-mile limit were to be seized regardless of nationality, or torpedoed if sighted near Cartagena.
- During construction of the Bronx–Whitestone Bridge, 38-year-old construction worker Victor Weikko fell 105 feet (32 m) to his death.
- Born: Jim Bouton, baseball player and author, in Newark, New Jersey (d. 2019); Lidiya Skoblikova, speed skater and coach, in Zlatoust, USSR; Robert Tear, tenor singer, teacher and conductor, in Barry, Vale of Glamorgan, Wales (d. 2011)

== March 9, 1939 (Thursday) ==
- The United States and Brazil signed a series of agreements through which the Brazilians received economic assistance.
- Born: Malcolm Bricklin, automobile entrepreneur, in Philadelphia, Pennsylvania

== March 10, 1939 (Friday) ==
- Czechoslovak president Emil Hácha deposed Jozef Tiso as premier of the autonomous province of Slovakia and declared martial law.
- 20 members of the Irish Republican Army were sentenced to 20 years in prison for conspiring to cause terrorist explosions.

== March 11, 1939 (Saturday) ==
- A new cabinet was formed in Slovakia without including a single member of the old Tiso government.
- Died: William Miller, 92, Australian multisport athlete

== March 12, 1939 (Sunday) ==
- The coronation ceremony for Pope Pius XII was held.
- Born: Johnny Callison, baseball player, in Qualls, Oklahoma (d. 2006)

== March 13, 1939 (Monday) ==
- Jozef Tiso went to Berlin and met with Adolf Hitler. Tiso agreed to call a meeting of the Slovak parliament and proclaim independence.
- The Pan-German League was dissolved.
- Born: Neil Sedaka, singer, pianist and record producer, in Brooklyn, New York (d. 2026)
- Died: Otto Rahn, 35, German writer, medievalist and SS officer (found frozen to death, ruled suicide)

== March 14, 1939 (Tuesday) ==
- Tiso returned to Bratislava and addressed the Slovak parliament, which then unanimously approved the declaration of an independent Slovak Republic.
- Czechoslovak president Emil Hácha went to Berlin to see Hitler, arriving shortly before midnight.
- The first trial of the Philadelphia poison ring case began. Herman Petrillo, one of four defendants charged with a total of fifty counts of murder, conspiracy and fraud, was the first to go on trial.

== March 15, 1939 (Wednesday) ==
- Adolf Hitler and Emil Hácha met in the Reich Chancellery after midnight. Hitler announced that the German army had orders to invade Czechoslovakia at 6:00 a.m. and unless Hácha ordered the Czechoslovak military to refrain from offering any resistance, the country would face massive destruction. Hácha collapsed during the harangue, but recovered enough to sign a document claiming that he had "confidently placed the fate of the Czech people and country in the hands of the Führer and German Reich." At 4:30 a.m. Hácha broadcast a radio message to his people urging them to remain calm.
- The Nazis marched unopposed into Czechoslovakia. That evening, Hitler and other Nazi leaders entered Prague.
- The Ruthenian region of Czechoslovakia declared independence as Carpatho-Ukraine.
- Mohammad Reza Pahlavi and Fawzia Fuad of Egypt were married in Cairo.
- Born: Alicia Freilich, writer, in Caracas, Venezuela

== March 16, 1939 (Thursday) ==
- The dismemberment of Czechoslovakia was completed with the proclamation of the Protectorate of Bohemia and Moravia.
- Hungarian soldiers marched into the Carpatho-Ukrainian capital of Khust with little resistance.
- German troops marched into Prešov. There had been some question as to whether the city was Slovak or Ruthenian territory, but the Germans settled the matter by getting there before the Hungarians did.
- The Reich Propaganda Ministry sent a confidential note to the German daily press explaining that the term "Großdeutsches Weltreich ("Greater German Empire") was undesirable because it was "reserved for future opportunities."
- Surrealist artist Salvador Dalí discovered that the store window display he had designed for Bonwit Teller on Fifth Avenue had been altered without his knowledge. Two mannequins, one of which had been scantily attired in a negligee of green feathers, had been replaced by mannequins dressed in suits. Dalí cursed out the management, entered his window display and pulled a bathtub (which was also part of the display) free from its moorings, accidentally causing the tub to slip free and crash through the window along with Dalí himself. The artist was arrested for mischief but later cleared of charges.
- Principal photography of The Wizard of Oz ends.
- Born: Carlos Bilardo, footballer and manager, in Buenos Aires, Argentina

== March 17, 1939 (Friday) ==
- The Battle of Nanchang began in the Second Sino-Japanese War.
- British Prime Minister Neville Chamberlain made a speech in Birmingham condemning Hitler for breaking the word he gave at the Munich Conference and warning that Britain would resist any further territorial expansion by Germany.
- Portugal and Francoist Spain signed a non-aggression pact known as the Iberian Pact.
- The London Conference on Palestine ended in failure.
- Born: Jim Gary, sculptor, in Sebastian, Florida (d. 2006); Giovanni Trapattoni, footballer and manager, in Cusano Milanino, Italy
- Died: Rufus Payne, 56, American blues musician

== March 18, 1939 (Saturday) ==
- The French Chamber of Deputies voted 321-264 to grant Prime Minister Édouard Daladier the power to rule by decree until November 30.
- The Western Australian state election was held. The Labor Party led by John Willcock won a third term in office.
- This is the cover date of the issue of The New Yorker in which the James Thurber short story "The Secret Life of Walter Mitty" appeared.

== March 19, 1939 (Sunday) ==
- Egyptologist Pierre Montet announced the discovery of the tomb of Psusennes I a few miles from Port Said.
- Lloyd L. Gaines, the plaintiff in Missouri ex rel. Gaines v. Canada, mysteriously disappeared and was never found.
- The Greek cargo steamship Vassilios T., sailing from Swansea to Venice and transporting coal, hit the rocks of Cape Stupišće southwest of Komiža and sank.

== March 20, 1939 (Monday) ==
- Germany issued an ultimatum to Lithuania demanding the Klaipėda Region, also known as the Memel Territory.
- Casado's representatives met with Nationalists at an airport near Burgos to discuss an armistice.
- The United States withdrew its ambassador to Germany over the Nazi seizure of Czechoslovakia.
- More than 5,000 works of "Degenerate Art" were allegedly burned in the yard of the Berlin fire station. However, there are no official records of the event (in contrast to the Nazi book burnings, which were held in public and well documented), and so little is known about the burning that it is not even certain whether it actually took place.
- Born: Brian Mulroney, 18th Prime Minister of Canada, in Baie-Comeau, Quebec (d. 2024)

== March 21, 1939 (Tuesday) ==
- The Lithuanian cabinet decided to give in to the German ultimatum and cede the Memel Territory to Germany.
- The National University of Cuyo was established in Argentina.
- Born: Tommy Davis, baseball player, in Brooklyn, New York (d. 2022)
- Died: Evald Aav, 39, Estonian composer

== March 22, 1939 (Wednesday) ==
- Lithuania ceded the Memel Territory (the Klaipėda Region) to Germany. Adolf Hitler, Admiral Erich Raeder and General Wilhelm Keitel boarded the pocket battleship Deutschland at Swinemünde that evening and sailed with a fleet toward Germany's newest territorial acquisition.
- The jury in the first Philadelphia poison ring trial returned a verdict of guilty and recommended the death penalty for Herman Petrillo. The sheer number of charges in the case meant that the trials of the other defendants would take another year to complete.
- In the U.S., undefeated LIU Brooklyn Blackbirds men's basketball team topped undefeated Loyola of Chicago in the championship game of the second annual National Invitation Tournament, 44–32. LIU's 24–0 final record was the first perfect season of college basketball's postseason tournament era.
- Born: Rafael Cruz, Cuban-American pastor, in Matanzas, Cuba

== March 23, 1939 (Thursday) ==
- Between 5 and 7 a.m. German troops crossed into Memel. 31 ships of the German fleet arrived at the port at 10:20 a.m. Aboard the Deutschland, Hitler signed the decree formally turning the Territory over to Germany.
- Hungarian troops marched into the Slovak Republic.

== March 24, 1939 (Friday) ==
- The 1939 Liechtenstein putsch takes place; approximately 40 members of the VBDL starting from Nendeln march towards Vaduz with the intention of overthrowing the government and provoking Liechtenstein's annexation into Germany.
- Romania signed an agreement with Germany for the development of Romanian oil, timber and mineral resources.
- Workman won the Grand National horse race.
- The romantic drama film Wuthering Heights starring Merle Oberon, Laurence Olivier, David Niven and Geraldine Fitzgerald premiered in Hollywood.
- The musical comedy film Three Smart Girls Grow Up was released.
- Born:
  - George Michael, broadcaster and host of The George Michael Sports Machine, in St. Louis, Missouri (d. 2009)
  - Lynda Baron, British actress in Urmston, Lancashire (d. 2022)

== March 25, 1939 (Saturday) ==
- Italy gave Albania an ultimatum demanding that a protectorate be established over the country and Italian troops be stationed within Albanian borders.
- Born: Toni Cade Bambara, author, filmmaker and activist, in New York City (d. 1995)

== March 26, 1939 (Sunday) ==
- The Nationalists launched the Final offensive of the Spanish Civil War.
- Commercial oil was discovered in England at Eakring.

== March 27, 1939 (Monday) ==
- Nazi Germany began an anti-Polish propaganda campaign against "oppression of Germans in German lands now controlled by Poles."
- Francoist Spain joined the Anti-Comintern Pact.
- The first-ever NCAA Men's Division I Basketball Tournament ended with Oregon defeating Ohio State 46-33 in the Final.
- Born: Leila Kasra, poet and lyricist, in Tehran, Iran (d. 1989)

== March 28, 1939 (Tuesday) ==
- The three-year Siege of Madrid ended with the Nationalist capture of the city.
- Casado's National Defense Council was dissolved.
- Died: Francis Matthew John Baker, 35 or 36, Australian politician (motor accident); Mario Lertora, 41, Italian artistic gymnast

== March 29, 1939 (Wednesday) ==
- The Nationalists took Cuenca, Ciudad Real, Jaén and Albacete.
- The Neville Chamberlain government unveiled plans to double the size of the Territorial Army.

== March 30, 1939 (Thursday) ==
- The Lithuanian parliament ratified the treaty ceding the Memel Territory to Germany.
- According to copyright records in the Library of Congress, this is the publication date of Detective Comics issue #27 (cover date of May), notable for the first appearance of Batman.
- In New York, Adolf Hitler's nephew William called his uncle "a menace."

== March 31, 1939 (Friday) ==
- The Chamberlain government pledged Anglo-French support if Polish independence was threatened by Germany.
- Born: Zviad Gamsakhurdia, 1st President of Georgia, in Tbilisi (d. 1993); Volker Schlöndorff, filmmaker, in Wiesbaden, Germany
- Died: Ioannis Tsangaridis, 51 or 52, Greek general
