= April 1939 =

Month of 1939

<<	April 1939					>>
Su	Mo	Tu	We	Th	Fr	Sa
						1
2	3	4	5	6	7	8
9	10	11	12	13	14	15
16	17	18	19	20	21	22
23	24	25	26	27	28	29
30

The following events occurred in April 1939:

== April 1, 1939 (Saturday) ==
- Francisco Franco announced final victory in the Spanish Civil War.
- The United States recognized Francoist Spain.
- The German battleship Tirpitz was launched in Wilhelmshaven. Adolf Hitler attended the ceremony and made a speech that included a response to Neville Chamberlain's pledge of the previous day to support Poland, saying "If they [the Western Allies] expect the Germany of today to sit patiently by until the very last day while they create satellite States and set them against Germany, then they are mistaking the Germany of today for the Germany of before the war."
- Cambridge won the 91st Boat Race. The race would not be officially held again until 1946, although unofficial races were held during the war.
- The Western film Dodge City starring Errol Flynn, Olivia de Havilland and Ann Sheridan had a special premiere in Kansas.
- Born: Ali MacGraw, actress, in Pound Ridge, New York; Spider Martin, photographer, in Fairfield, Alabama (d. 2003); Phil Niekro, baseball player, in Blaine, Ohio (d. 2020)
- Died: Anton Makarenko, 51, Russian educator and writer

== April 2, 1939 (Sunday) ==
- 55,000 Nationalists marched in a victory parade through Madrid.
- General elections were held in Belgium. The Catholic Party won a plurality in the Chamber of Representatives.
- Polish military officer and politician Walery Sławek shot himself in the mouth at his Warsaw apartment. He died the following day.
- Ralph Guldahl won the 6th Masters Tournament.
- Born: Marvin Gaye, singer, songwriter and musician, in Washington, D.C. (d. 1984)

== April 3, 1939 (Monday) ==
- Hitler gave a top secret directive to the military code-named Case White, ordering the preparation of military operations against Poland for any time from September 1 forward.
- Folketing elections were held in Denmark. The Social Democrats lost 4 seats but maintained their majority.
- Died: Walery Sławek, 59, Polish military officer and politician (suicide)

== April 4, 1939 (Tuesday) ==
- Three-year old Faisal II became King of Iraq upon the death of his father.
- Hungary and the Slovak Republic signed a peace treaty in Budapest ending their short conflict. Slovakia ceded a small amount of territory to Hungary.
- Glenn Miller and His Orchestra recorded "Moonlight Serenade".
- Born: Hugh Masekela, jazz trumpeter, in Witbank, South Africa (d. 2018)
- Died: Ghazi of Iraq, 27, King of Iraq (auto accident); Joaquín García Morato, 45, Nationalist fighter ace of the Spanish Civil War (crashed while performing low acrobatics for newsreel cameras)

== April 5, 1939 (Wednesday) ==
- Albert François Lebrun was re-elected by the French National Assembly to another seven-year term as President of France.
- Britain's largest aircraft carrier, HMS Illustrious, was launched at Barrow-in-Furness.
- Born: Leka, Crown Prince of Albania (d. 2011)

== April 6, 1939 (Thursday) ==
- Britain and France agreed on a mutual assistance pact with Poland, pledging to come to Poland's aid in the event of a German attack.
- The Albanian government rejected Italy's ultimatum.

== April 7, 1939 (Friday) ==
- The Italian invasion of Albania began. The Albanians offered little resistance.
- Queen Geraldine of Albania fled to Greece with two-day-old son Leka. King Zog remained in Albania.
- Joseph Lyons died unexpectedly of a heart attack, the first Australian prime minister to die in office. Earl Page became 11th Prime Minister of Australia.
- Born: Francis Ford Coppola, film director, in Detroit, Michigan; David Frost, journalist and media personality, in Tenterden, England (d. 2013)
- Died: Joseph Lyons, 59, 10th Prime Minister of Australia (heart attack)

== April 8, 1939 (Saturday) ==
- King Zog fled Albania to Greece as Italian forces entered Tirana.
- Born: Elizabeth Clare Prophet, New Age minister and writer, in Long Branch, New Jersey (d. 2009)

== April 9, 1939 (Sunday) ==
- Marian Anderson gave an open air concert on the steps of the Lincoln Memorial in Washington to 75,000 people on Easter Sunday. This venue was chosen after Anderson was barred from the DAR Constitution Hall because she was black.

== April 10, 1939 (Monday) ==
- The Italian army completed the occupation of Albania.
- Dutch troops were sent to their border with Germany.
- The first edition of The Big Book (Alcoholics Anonymous) is published.
- Born: Claudio Magris, scholar, translator and writer, in Trieste, Italy
- Died: Peter Patton, 63, English ice hockey player and administrator

== April 11, 1939 (Tuesday) ==
- Hungary announced its withdrawal from the League of Nations.
- The game of darts was banned in Glasgow pubs for being "too dangerous".

== April 12, 1939 (Wednesday) ==
- Shefqet Vërlaci, a bitter enemy of the exiled King Zog, was made the new Prime Minister of Albania. Zog had once been engaged to marry Vërlaci's daughter but broke it off, an affront that Vërlaci had sworn to avenge. The new National Assembly voted to abrogate the constitution of 1928 and offer the Crown of Albania to Victor Emmanuel III of Italy.
- Slovak Propaganda Minister Alexander Mach declared that Slovakia would pass antisemitic measures similar to Germany's Nuremberg Laws.
- Born: Alan Ayckbourn, playwright, in Hampstead, London, England

== April 13, 1939 (Thursday) ==
- Britain and France both pledged to lend Greece and Romania all assistance possible if those two countries went to war to preserve their independence.
- The Hindustani Lal Sena was formed.
- Born: Seamus Heaney, poet and playwright, in Castledawson, Northern Ireland (d. 2013); Paul Sorvino, actor, in Brooklyn, New York (d. 2022)

== April 14, 1939 (Friday) ==
- U.S. President Franklin D. Roosevelt sent Hitler a message asking, "Are you willing to give assurance that your armed forces will not attack or invade the territory or possessions of the following independent nations?" Thirty-one countries were then listed. "If such assurance is given by your Government, I shall immediately transmit it to the Governments of the nations I have named, and I shall simultaneously inquire whether, as I am reasonably sure, each of the nations enumerated above will in turn give like assurance for transmission to you. Reciprocal assurances such as I have outlined will bring to the world an immediate measure of relief." Adolf Hitler set out his plan for a new government under Karl Dönitz. A similar message was also sent to Benito Mussolini, who referred to the letter in private as "absurd" but never made a public reply. Roosevelt did not expect anything substantial to come out of the message, but sent it with the intention of demonstrating to the world an important issue between democracies and dictatorships.
- The John Steinbeck novel The Grapes of Wrath was published.

== April 15, 1939 (Saturday) ==
- Romania began to pull thousands of troops from its border with Hungary following a conference between Armand Călinescu and László Bárdossy.
- Born: Howard Winstone, boxer, in Merthyr Tydfil, Wales (d. 2000)
- Died: Oliver Percy Bernard, 58, English architect

== April 16, 1939 (Sunday) ==
- The Soviet Union proposed an alliance with Britain and France to contain German aggression in Eastern Europe.
- A law was published in Italy proclaiming King Victor Emmanuel III's acceptance of the Crown of Albania.
- The Boston Bruins defeated the Toronto Maple Leafs 3–1 to win the Stanley Cup, four games to one.
- Born: Dusty Springfield, pop singer, in West Hampstead, London, England (d. 1999)

== April 17, 1939 (Monday) ==
- Opening Day of the 1939 major league baseball season took place. To celebrate the 100th anniversary of the mythical invention of baseball by Abner Doubleday, every major and minor league team wore a special centennial patch on their sleeves all season.
- Joe Louis retained the world heavyweight boxing title by knocking out Jack Roper in the first round at Wrigley Field in Los Angeles.

== April 18, 1939 (Tuesday) ==
- Neville Chamberlain vowed to go to the aid of the Netherlands, Denmark or Switzerland if they were attacked.
- Slovakia approved its first antisemitic legislation.
- The French ocean liner SS Paris caught fire and sank in Le Havre.

== April 19, 1939 (Wednesday) ==
- Hitler appointed Franz von Papen German Ambassador to Turkey.
- Slovakia banned Jews from working as journalists and restricted Jewish lawyers to 4% of the total legal profession.
- Ellison Brown won the Boston Marathon.
- Born: Ali Khamenei, 2nd Supreme Leader of Iran, in Mashhad (d. 2026)
- Died: Henry Stephens Salt, 87, English writer and social reform activist

== April 20, 1939 (Thursday) ==
- Adolf Hitler's 50th birthday was celebrated as a national holiday throughout Germany and elsewhere.
- The Battle of Suixian–Zaoyang began.
- Ted Williams made his major league debut for the Boston Red Sox, going 1-for-4 with a double during a 2–0 loss to the New York Yankees.
- A customs union between Italy and Albania was established.
- Billie Holiday recorded the anti-lynching song "Strange Fruit" in the United States.
- Born: Elspeth Ballantyne, actress, in Adelaide, Australia
- Died: Teodoro R. Yangco, 77, Philippine businessman and philanthropist

== April 21, 1939 (Friday) ==
- The San Jacinto Monument was dedicated near Houston, Texas.

== April 22, 1939 (Saturday) ==
- Johnson Wax Headquarters, designed by Frank Lloyd Wright, opened in Racine, Wisconsin.
- The drama film Dark Victory starring Bette Davis was released.
- Born: Jason Miller, playwright, in Queens, New York (d. 2001); Ann Mitchell, actress, in Stepney, East London, England; Simon Napier-Bell, music manager, author and journalist, in Ealing Common, West London, England

== April 23, 1939 (Sunday) ==
- A decree from the Spanish Ministry of Finance restored the property of Alfonso XIII and all his relatives within four degrees of lineal blood relation.
- Born: Lee Majors, actor, in Wyandotte, Michigan

== April 24, 1939 (Monday) ==
- Bolivian President Germán Busch announced the dissolution of the Constituent Assembly and assumed dictatorial powers.

== April 25, 1939 (Tuesday) ==
- On Budget Day in the United Kingdom, Chancellor of the Exchequer Sir John Simon raised taxes to help finance the £630 million defense budget.
- President Roosevelt created the Federal Security Agency.
- The Zeesen short-wave transmitter in Nazi Germany began making broadcasts in Arabic aimed at North Africa and the Middle East.
- Born: Ted Kooser, poet, in Ames, Iowa
- Died: John Foulds, 58, British composer; Georges Ricard-Cordingley, 66, French painter

== April 26, 1939 (Wednesday) ==
- The Neville Chamberlain government in the United Kingdom announced that due to international events, a bill would be introduced in parliament introducing military conscription for all males aged 20 and 21.
- Robert Menzies became 12th Prime Minister of Australia.
- Fritz Wendel set a new world air speed record of 469.2 mph (755 km/h) in a Messerschmitt Me 209.

== April 27, 1939 (Thursday) ==
- The House of Commons approved Chamberlain's conscription plan, 376–145.
- Born: Judy Carne, actress, in Northampton, England (d. 2015); Erik Pevernagie, painter and writer, in Belgium; João Bernardo Vieira, President of Guinea-Bissau, in Bissau, Portuguese Guinea (d. 2009)

== April 28, 1939 (Friday) ==
- Hitler made a speech to the Reichstag renouncing the Anglo-German Naval Agreement and German–Polish declaration of non-aggression, yet offered to negotiate new non-aggression pacts with any nations that asked for them. Hitler evoked laughter in the Reichstag by reciting, in exaggerated and sarcastic tones, the thirty-one countries that President Roosevelt had listed in the telegram of two weeks earlier.

== April 29, 1939 (Saturday) ==
- Portsmouth beat Wolverhampton Wanderers 4–1 in the FA Cup Final at Wembley Stadium. It was the last FA Cup Final played until 1946.
- Subhas Chandra Bose resigned as President of the Indian National Congress. Rajendra Prasad became the new president.
- The play Cesare based on the life of Julius Caesar by Giovacchino Forzano in collaboration with Benito Mussolini premiered at the Teatro Argentina in Rome.
- The Bronx–Whitestone Bridge opened in New York City.

== April 30, 1939 (Sunday) ==
- The 1939 New York World's Fair opened. NBC inaugurated its first television broadcast with coverage of President Roosevelt at the event.
- Baseball's "Iron Man", Lou Gehrig, plays his 2,130th consecutive game with the New York Yankees. This was also his final game ever played; suffering from ALS, Gehrig took himself out of the starting lineup in the next game three days later. He remained on the Yankees as team captain for the rest of the season.
