= List of shipwrecks in August 1939 =

The list of shipwrecks in August 1939 includes ships sunk, foundered, grounded, or otherwise lost during August 1939.

== 1 August ==
List of shipwrecks: 1 August 1939
Ship	State	Description
Illinoian	United States	The cargo ship ran aground in the Cape Fear River, Wilmington, North Carolina. She was refloated undamaged on 7 August.

== 2 August ==
List of shipwrecks: 2 August 1939
Ship	State	Description
Zuid Holland	France	The dredger sprang a leak and sank at Saint Nazaire, Loire-Inférieure.

== 3 August ==
List of shipwrecks: 3 August 1939
Ship	State	Description
Hertha	United States	The =fishing vessel was swamped by heavy seas breaking over her stern and sank 3 nautical miles (5.6 km; 3.5 mi) west of Cape Bartolome, Territory of Alaska (55°14′N 133°37′W). Her captain perished, but the fishing vessel Argus (United States) rescued the other six members of her crew.

== 4 August ==
List of shipwrecks: 4 August 1939
Ship	State	Description
Bornholm	Norway	The cargo ship collided with Lydia M ( Brazil) at Santos, Brazil. Both vessels were damaged at the bows and beached.
Junyoshi Maru	Japan	The cargo ship ran aground at Shiokubisaki, Hokkaido. She was declared a total loss.
UJ 175 Perseus	Kriegsmarine	The auxiliary submarine chaser was lost on this date.

== 5 August ==
List of shipwrecks: 5 August 1939
Ship	State	Description
Andrea F Luckenbach	United States	The cargo ship ran aground at Port Eads, Louisiana. Refloated on 7 August.
Bernhard	Norway	The cargo ship struck a reef in the Strait of Canso and was holed. She was beached at Eddy Point, Nova Scotia, Canada. She was refloated on 11 August.

== 6 August ==
List of shipwrecks: 6 August 1939
Ship	State	Description
Depere	United States	The cargo ship struck rocks in the Wrangell Narrows, Alaska and was beached. She was refloated on 11 August.

== 7 August ==
List of shipwrecks: 7 August 1939
Ship	State	Description
Fahe	Canada	The schooner was destroyed by fire 8 nautical miles (15 km) off Coffin Island, Nova Scotia.

== 8 August ==
List of shipwrecks: 8 August 1939
Ship	State	Description
Astree	France	The cargo ship came ashore at Ouistreham, Calvados. She was refloated the next day.
Frank B. Baird	United Kingdom	The cargo ship ran aground at Murray Bay, Quebec, Canada. She was refloated the next day leaking, and sailed to Quebec City for drydocking.
Rainbow	United States	The fishing vessel was destroyed by fire on the north side of South Indian Island, Territory of Alaska (58°22′15″N 134°42′00″W). The only person on board survived.
Waimea	New Zealand	The coaster was scuttled in the Cook Strait off Turakirae Head, North Island as a means of disposal.
Wendover	United Kingdom	The cargo ship grounded in the St Lawrence River at Cape Goose, Canada. She was refloated later that day.

== 9 August ==
List of shipwrecks: 9 August 1939
Ship	State	Description
Dalblair	United Kingdom	The cargo ship ran aground south of Gothenburg, Sweden. She was refloated the next day after offloading 400 tons of cargo.
Povvidenza	Italy	The cargo ship ran aground at Cuxhaven, Germany. Refloated the next day.
Sinbad	British Mandate for Palestine	The patrol vessel exploded and sank off Wadi Falik, south of Nathanya.

== 11 August ==
List of shipwrecks: 11 August 1939
Ship	State	Description
Alga	Italy	The cargo ship ran aground on the Meloria Bank. Refloated the next day.
Fernglen	Norway	The cargo ship ran aground on the Quita Sueño Bank, Colombia. Refloated on 23 August.
Sveti Duje	Yugoslavia	The cargo ship struck rocks at Point Silo and was beached in Split Bay. She was refloated on 16 August and drydocked for repairs after discharging her cargo.

== 12 August ==
List of shipwrecks: 12 August 1939
Ship	State	Description
Gerania	Sweden	The cargo ship collided with Heemskerk (Netherlands) off Vlissingen, Netherlands and was beached to prevent her sinking.

== 13 August ==
List of shipwrecks: 13 August 1939
Ship	State	Description
Treworlas	United Kingdom	The cargo ship ran aground in the River Thames at Poplar, London. She was later refloated.

== 15 August ==
List of shipwrecks: 15 August 1939
Ship	State	Description
Strindheim	Norway	The cargo ship struck a mine and sank in the North Sea off the mouth of the River Tyne with the loss of nine crew.
Trade Wind	United Kingdom	The motor yacht collided with Lapwing (United Kingdom) in the River Thames opposite the Royal Naval College, Greenwich, and sank.

== 16 August ==
List of shipwrecks: 16 August 1939
Ship	State	Description
Cabo Sardao	United Kingdom	The tug capsized and sank in the Tagus whilst assisting RMS Vandyck. She was refloated some months later, repaired and returned to service.

== 17 August ==
List of shipwrecks: 17 August 1939
Ship	State	Description
Prague	United Kingdom	The passenger ferry ran aground at Harwich, Essex. She was refloated later that day.
Robbie Burns	Australia	The barge sank north of Kangaroo Island.

== 18 August ==
List of shipwrecks: 18 August 1939
Ship	State	Description
O. M. Arnold	United States	The motor vessel sank in a storm in Chatham Strait in the Alexander Archipelago, Territory of Alaska with the loss of three lives. There were five survivors. She was on a voyage from Chatham to Noyes Island with a cargo of 60 tons of fresh salmon.
President de Vogue	Norway	The tanker ran aground at Port-de-Bouc, Bouches-du-Rhône, France.
Tourny	France	The cargo ship ran aground at Dog Island, River Gambia, British Gambia.

== 19 August ==
List of shipwrecks: 19 August 1939
Ship	State	Description
Herbrand	Norway	The tanker ran aground at Buenos Aires, Argentina. She was refloated undamaged on 22 August after discharging 7,000 tons of cargo.
Løvland	Norway	The cargo ship came ashore at Cape North, Cape Breton Island, Nova Scotia, Canada and was wrecked.

== 20 August ==
List of shipwrecks: 20 August 1939
Ship	State	Description
Aagot	Finland	The cargo ship ran aground on Saltholm, Denmark. She was later refloated.
Grace	United States	The motorboat was severely damaged in a collision with the motorboat ARB 10 (United States) between Sokolof Island (56.5011°N 132.5897°W) and Vank Island, Territory of Alaska (56.4708°N 132.6136°W). ARB 10 towed the partially submerged wreck of Grace to the beach and anchored it there, then picked up Grace's crew of five. Grace was declared a total loss.
Hans Voss	Germany	The auxiliary sailing vessel collided with Bodegraven (Netherlands) off Hamburg and sank.
Kap Velaluka	United States	The fishing vessel was destroyed by fire in Murder Cove at the southern tip of Admiralty Island in the Alexander Archipelago, Territory of Alaska. Her crew of five survived.

== 21 August ==
List of shipwrecks: 21 August 1939
Ship	State	Description
Sire	United Kingdom	The cargo ship ran aground in the Saint Lawrence River 2 nautical miles (3.7 km) upstream of the Cape Maillard Buoy. She was refloated later that day.
Wanda	United States	With no one aboard but a mechanic who was testing her engine, the fishing vessel caught fire while tied to a dock at Dayville, Territory of Alaska, when the engine sparked and ignited gasoline in the bilge. The mechanic escaped. When people on the scene could not extinguish the fire, Wanda was towed to a beach across from a local cannery, where the fire completely destroyed her.

== 22 August ==
List of shipwrecks: 22 August 1939
Ship	State	Description
Estella	United States	The motorboat was destroyed in a small cove immediately north of Wards Cove, Territory of Alaska (55°24′30″N 131°43′30″W) after her gasoline engine backfired, causing an explosion and igniting a fire that consumed her. The two men aboard were blown clear of her cabin by the explosion and survived.
Parita	Panama	The passenger ship was beached at Tel Aviv, Mandatory Palestine with 900 Jewish refugees on board.

== 23 August ==
List of shipwrecks: 23 August 1939
Ship	State	Description
Constantinos Louloudis	Greece	The cargo ship ran aground in the River Paraná, Argentina. She was refloated on 25 August.
Itacare	Brazil	The passenger ship capsized and sank at Ilhéus with the loss of 34 of the 66 people on board.

== 24 August ==
List of shipwrecks: 24 August 1939
Ship	State	Description
Lages	Brazil	The cargo ship ran aground at Rosario, Argentina. She was refloated on 27 August.

== 25 August ==
List of shipwrecks: 25 August 1939
Ship	State	Description
Tyalgum	United Kingdom	Tyalgum The cargo ship ran aground in the Tweed River at Newcastle, New South Wales, Australia, and was wrecked.

== 27 August ==
List of shipwrecks: 27 August 1939
Ship	State	Description
Tiger	Kriegsmarine	The torpedo boat collided with Max Schultz (Kriegsmarine) off Bornholm, Denmark and sank with the loss of two crewmen.

== 28 August ==
List of shipwrecks: 28 August 1939
Ship	State	Description
Sildra	Norway	The tanker came ashore at "They Roustant" whilst on a voyage from Corpus Christi, Florida, United States to Port-de-Bouc, Bouches-du-Rhône, France. Refloated the next day.
Tucuman	Argentina	The tug capsized and sank at South Darsena with the loss of two crew whilst assisting Glasgow (Argentina) to dock.

== 29 August ==
List of shipwrecks: 29 August 1939
Ship	State	Description
Defy	United States	The fish packer struck a rock off Kaigani Point (54°45′10″N 132°39′10″W) in Cordova Bay, Territory of Alaska, then, while trying to reach shore in a sinking condition, was stranded on another rock. Her crew of two survived. By 30 August she had slid into deeper water and begun to break up gradually and was deemed a total loss.
Hilda	United Kingdom	The cargo ship ran aground on the Isle of May in the Firth of Forth. She was refloated later that day.
Porsanger	Finland	The cargo ship came ashore at Östra Torp, Sweden. She was refloated the next day after jettisoning 400 tons of cargo.
Rustler	United States	The fishing vessel sank without loss of life 0.75 nautical miles (1.39 km; 0.86 mi) south of Port Protection Point (56°19′20″N 133°36′35″W) in Sumner Strait in the Alexander Archipelago, Territory of Alaska. Her crew of four abandoned ship in a skiff and made it to shore, where the vessel ARB 8 (United States) rescued them.

== 30 August ==
List of shipwrecks: 30 August 1939
Ship	State	Description
Ållotar	Finland	The cargo ship collided with Dagny (Finland) off Smygehuk, Sweden, and sank with the loss of three of her seven crew. The survivors were rescued by Dagny.
Saint Conan	United Kingdom	The coaster ran aground on Sanda Island, Argyllshire, and was wrecked.
