= List of shipwrecks in June 1939 =

The list of shipwrecks in June 1939 includes ships sunk, foundered, grounded, or otherwise lost during June 1939.

== 1 June ==
List of shipwrecks: 1 June 1939
| Ship | State | Description |
|---|---|---|
| Herta | Germany | The cargo ship ran aground off Terschelling, Friesland, Netherlands. |
| HMS Thetis | Royal Navy | The T-class submarine sank whilst on trials with the loss of 99 lives. She was salvaged, repaired and later recommissioned as Thunderbolt. |

== 2 June ==
List of shipwrecks: 2 June 1939
| Ship | State | Description |
|---|---|---|
| Besholt | Norway | The cargo ship caught fire at Philadelphia, Pennsylvania, United States and was severely damaged. |
| Nurtureton | United Kingdom | The cargo ship ran aground at Buenos Aires, Argentina. |
| San Ubaldo | United Kingdom | The tanker ran aground at Greenock, Renfrewshire. |

== 5 June ==
List of shipwrecks: 5 June 1939
| Ship | State | Description |
|---|---|---|
| Goggiam | Italy | The cargo ship ran aground in fog at Procida. She was refloated the next day. |

== 8 June ==
List of shipwrecks: 8 June 1939
| Ship | State | Description |
|---|---|---|
| Fotini Carras | Greece | The cargo ship ran aground on the South Bellona Reef, Australia (21°25′S 159°34′E) and was wrecked. |
| Kieldiep | Netherlands | The coaster came ashore at Faversham, Kent, United Kingdom. |

== 10 June ==
List of shipwrecks: 10 June 1939
| Ship | State | Description |
|---|---|---|
| Brian | United Kingdom | The cargo ship ran aground at Goole, Yorkshire and was severely damaged. She was later refloated. |

== 12 June ==
List of shipwrecks: 12 June 1939
| Ship | State | Description |
|---|---|---|
| Ben Hur | France | The barquentine caught fire and was abandoned in a sinking condition in the Atlantic Ocean (48°16′N 49°27′W). Her crew were rescued by Duchess of Bedford (United Kingdom). |
| Penolver | United Kingdom | The cargo ship struck a rock and was beached at Louisbourg, Nova Scotia, Canada. |

== 14 June ==
List of shipwrecks: 14 June 1939
| Ship | State | Description |
|---|---|---|
| Dalhanna | United Kingdom | The cargo ship ran aground in the Paraná River between Zárate and Buenos Aires, Argentina. She was refloated later that day. |
| Shellco | Canada | The coastal tanker ran aground on the Stimpson Reef, British Columbia. |

== 15 June ==
List of shipwrecks: 15 June 1939
| Ship | State | Description |
|---|---|---|
| Phénix | French Navy | The Redoutable-class submarine never resurfaced after submerging for a mock attack on the light cruiser Lamotte-Picquet (French Navy during training manoeuvers in the South China Sea off the coast of French Indochina. All 71 men on board died. Her wreck was found the next day 12 nautical miles (22 km; 14 mi) northeast of the island of Hon Chut with its stern resting in 105 metres (344 ft) of water and its bow floating at a depth of 40 metres (131 ft). |
| Zazpiakbat | France | The schooner collided with Murena (Netherlands) off North Sydney, Nova Scotia, Canada and was severely damaged. |

== 16 June ==
List of shipwrecks: 16 June 1939
| Ship | State | Description |
|---|---|---|
| Pang Jin | China | The junk foundered in the Red Sea whilst on a voyage from Hong Kong to New York, United States where she was to be an exhibit in the 1939 New York World's Fair. |

== 18 June ==
List of shipwrecks: 18 June 1939
| Ship | State | Description |
|---|---|---|
| Aide de Camp | Canada | The sailing ship ran aground on Friar Island, Owls Head, Maine, United States and was wrecked with the loss of sixteen lives. |
| Arlington | United Kingdom | The cargo ship ran aground 25 nautical miles (46 km) from Little Current, Ontario, Canada. She was refloated on 20 June. |

== 19 June ==
List of shipwrecks: 19 June 1939
| Ship | State | Description |
|---|---|---|
| Henry M. Dawes | United States | The tanker ran aground in Mobile Bay, Alabama. She was refloated 22 June. |

== 21 June ==
List of shipwrecks: 21 June 1939
| Ship | State | Description |
|---|---|---|
| Baltabor | United Kingdom | The cargo liner ran aground at Liepāja, Latvia after being refloated having been aground since 12 February. She was refloated the next day and entered the harbour, where she was beached. Baltabor was refloated and drydocked on 1 July, but was subsequently scrapped. |
| Chita Maru | Japan | The cargo ship struck a rock at approximately 34°N 126°E and sprang a leak. |
| M. E. Johnson | United Kingdom | The schooner came ashore at Mizen Head, County Cork, Ireland. |

== 22 June ==
List of shipwrecks: 22 June 1939
| Ship | State | Description |
|---|---|---|
| Newton Pine | United Kingdom | The cargo ship ran aground in the Paraná River at Buenos Aires, Argentina. She was refloated the next day. |
| Point Lobos | United States | The cargo ship ran aground at San Francisco, California. |
| Shoyei Maru | Japan | The cargo ship became stranded south of Gensan, Korea. She was declared a total loss. |

== 23 June ==
List of shipwrecks: 23 June 1939
| Ship | State | Description |
|---|---|---|
| Ernrix | United Kingdom | The coaster sprang a leak off Staithes, Yorkshire and sank in Tees Bay. All eleven crew were rescued. |
| Stakesby | United Kingdom | The cargo ship ran aground near Puerto Obligado, Argentina. She was refloated two days later and returned to service. |

== 24 June ==
List of shipwrecks: 24 June 1939
| Ship | State | Description |
|---|---|---|
| Dirphys | Greece | The cargo ship ran aground on the English Bank, in the River Plate off Montevideo, Uruguay. She was later refloated. |
| Jalarajan | United Kingdom | The cargo ship ran aground at 8°06′N 77°10′E and developed a leak. She put in to Cochin, India. |
| Trinidad | Chile | The passenger ship came ashore at Reloncaví. She was later refloated and proceeded to Puerto Montt where she was beached. |

== 26 June ==
List of shipwrecks: 26 June 1939
| Ship | State | Description |
|---|---|---|
| China Maru | Japan | The cargo ship ran aground off Balum Island, Feni Islands, Papua New Guinea 130 miles (210 km) north east of Rabaul. She was refloated on or after 30 June, repaired and returned to service. |
| Helene | Germany | The cargo ship ran aground at Portage Island, Washington, United States. She was later refloated. |

== 27 June ==
List of shipwrecks: 27 June 1939
| Ship | State | Description |
|---|---|---|
| Ploubazlanec | France | The cargo ship ran aground at Ras el Amar, Cape Bon, Tunisia. She was refloated on 30 June apparently not severely damaged, and taken under tow for Bizerta. Ploubazlanec sank at 37°20′N 10°37′E. Her crew were rescued by Ain el Turk (France). |

== 28 June ==
List of shipwrecks: 28 June 1939
| Ship | State | Description |
|---|---|---|
| Lipari | France | The passenger ship ran aground in the Paraná River, Buenos Aires, Argentina. She was refloated on 2 July. |

== 30 June ==
List of shipwrecks: 30 June 1939
| Ship | State | Description |
|---|---|---|
| Mersington Court | United Kingdom | The cargo ship ran aground at Buenos Aires, Argentina. She was refloated on 2 July. |
| Notre Dame d'Uronéa | France | The schooner was abandoned in a sinking condition 125 nautical miles (232 km) west south west of Cape Race, Newfoundland. Her crew were rescued. |
