= August 1939 =

Month of 1939

<<	August 1939					>>
Su	Mo	Tu	We	Th	Fr	Sa
		1	2	3	4	5
6	7	8	9	10	11	12
13	14	15	16	17	18	19
20	21	22	23	24	25	26
27	28	29	30	31

The following events occurred in August 1939:

== August 1, 1939 (Tuesday) ==
- Prohibition of alcohol went into effect in Bombay.
- Nazi Germany forbade the sale of lottery tickets to Jews.
- Glenn Miller and His Orchestra recorded "In the Mood".
- Born:
  - Terry Kiser, American actor; in Omaha, Nebraska
  - Robert James Waller, American author; in Rockford, Iowa (d. 2017)

== August 2, 1939 (Wednesday) ==
- Albert Einstein signed a letter written by Leo Szilard addressed to U.S. President Franklin D. Roosevelt, warning that Germany might develop an atomic weapon and suggesting that the United States should start its own nuclear program. The letter would prompt Roosevelt to take action and eventually result in the Manhattan Project.
- British Prime Minister Neville Chamberlain introduced a motion to adjourn the House of Commons until October 3. The motion passed 250-132, and an attempted amendment by the opposition to shorten the length of adjournment to August 21 was defeated. More than 30 Conservatives supported the shorter recess and expressed their displeasure by abstaining from voting. One of them was Winston Churchill, and another was Ronald Cartland, who during a speech prophetically said, "We are in the situation that within a month we may be going to fight, and we may be going to die."
- Born:
  - Wes Craven, American filmmaker, in Cleveland, Ohio (d. 2015)
  - John W. Snow, American businessman and U.S. Secretary of the Treasury; in Toledo, Ohio
- Died: Harvey Spencer Lewis, 55, American occultist

== August 3, 1939 (Thursday) ==
- The medical licenses of all Jewish doctors in Nazi Germany were nullified.
- Born: Jimmie Nicol, English drummer and temporary member of The Beatles; in London

== August 4, 1939 (Friday) ==
- A Chinese mob in Tianjin attacked offices of the British International Export Corporation, smashing furniture and other equipment and throwing it into the Hai River. The British said the attack was instigated by the Australians.
- Born: Frankie Ford, American singer ("Sea Cruise"); in Gretna, Louisiana (d. 2015)

== August 5, 1939 (Saturday) ==
- The 76th United States Congress adjourned for the rest of the summer.
- Poland sent Danzig a note demanding that interference with Polish customs guards on the border with East Prussia cease.
- Thirteen women known as Las Trece Rosas were executed in Francoist Spain for aiding a military rebellion.
- Born: Princess Irene of the Netherlands; at Soestdijk Palace in Baarn

== August 6, 1939 (Sunday) ==
- Poland celebrated the twenty-fifth anniversary of the Polish Legions' entry into the World War. Marshal Edward Rydz-Śmigły told a cheering crowd of 100,000 that "violence inflicted by force must be resisted by force" and that Poland's conduct with regard to Danzig "will be adjusted to the conduct of the other side."

== August 7, 1939 (Monday) ==
- Swedish businessman Birger Dahlerus arranged a meeting at his house in Schleswig-Holstein between his friend Hermann Göring and seven important British businessmen in an effort to avoid war. The meeting was friendly and Dahlerus believed that an informal agreement was in place to hold a peace conference.
- Danzig rejected the Polish demand of August 5, refusing to recognize untrained Polish officials as supervisors of Danzig customs.

== August 8, 1939 (Tuesday) ==
- 1,300 warplanes filled the skies over Britain on the first of several days of air defence tests.
- The historical adventure film Stanley and Livingstone starring Spencer Tracy and Cedric Hardwicke premiered at Grauman's Chinese Theatre in Hollywood.
- Born: Phil Balsley, American baritone singer of The Statler Brothers; in Augusta County, Virginia

== August 9, 1939 (Wednesday) ==
- George VI conducted a fleet review of 133 ships at Weymouth Bay.
- Italy published a law introducing fines for anyone moving from the country to a city of 25,000 people or more unless they already had work there. Mussolini had recently advised moving out of the cities if possible to avoid potential bombing in event of war.
- Born:
  - The Mighty Hannibal, American singer, songwriter and record producer; in Atlanta (d. 2014)
  - Bulle Ogier, French actress; in Boulogne-Billancourt
  - Claude Osteen, American baseball player; in Caney Spring, Tennessee

== August 10, 1939 (Thursday) ==
- Dirk Jan de Geer became Prime Minister of the Netherlands.
- Citizens of the Protectorate of Bohemia and Moravia were ordered to turn in all arms and explosives to the government. Failure to comply could be punishable by death.
- Died: Carlo Galimberti, 45, Italian Olympic champion weightlifter, died of burns sustained in the line of duty as a firefighter five days earlier from a boiler explosion. Two other firemen, Aldo Parora and Anselmo Pasi, also died.

== August 11, 1939 (Friday) ==
- Starting at midnight, half of England went dark for four hours in a test to determine how effectively the country could shroud itself from enemy planes.
- Italian Foreign Minister Galeazzo Ciano went to Salzburg to begin three days of talks with his German counterpart Joachim von Ribbentrop. Ciano soon realized that Germany was serious in its willingness to risk starting a general war. This was not welcome news for the Italians, who were unprepared for war and did not think that the Axis powers would fare well if Britain and France came to the aid of Poland.
- Died: Jean Bugatti, 30, French-Italian automobile designer, died in a car crash.

== August 12, 1939 (Saturday) ==
- Count Ciano and Joachim von Ribbentrop rode to the Berghof and met with Adolf Hitler, who confidently asserted that the war against Poland would be "a localized war."
- The Anglo-French military mission to the Soviet Union began talks in Moscow.
- German submarines U-49 and U-61 were commissioned.
- The spy film The Spy in Black premiered in the United Kingdom. When it was released two months later in the United States it was titled U-Boat 29.
- Born:
  - Skip Caray, American sportscaster; in St. Louis, Missouri (d. 2008)
  - George Hamilton, American actor; in Memphis, Tennessee
  - David Jacobs, American television writer; in Baltimore, Maryland (d. 2023)
  - S. Jayakumar, former Singaporean politician, 4th Senior Minister of Singapore

== August 13, 1939 (Sunday) ==
- Count Ciano returned to Italy convinced that the Germans had already decided on war and that nothing could be done to deter them. "I am certain that even if the Germans were given more than they ask for they would attack just the same, because they are possessed by the demon of destruction", Ciano wrote in his diary.
- A Pan American World Airways Sikorsky S-43 made a crash landing at Rio de Janeiro harbor, killing 14 of 16 aboard.

== August 14, 1939 (Monday) ==
- U.S. President Franklin D. Roosevelt announced that he would proclaim Thanksgiving to be moved up one week from the last Thursday of November (the 30th) to the next-to-last Thursday (the 23rd) this year. The president explained that stores had requested the change to give them extra time to sell merchandise between Thanksgiving and Christmas. Additionally, workers had complained of the long stretch of time between Labor Day and Thanksgiving.
- The Jean-Antoine Watteau painting L'Indifferent, stolen from the Louvre on June 12, was reported to have been returned to authorities. The thief, who was himself an artist, explained that he was upset to see that the painting had been badly retouched so he decided to steal it and do some repairs.
- Actress Janet Gaynor and costume designer Adrian were married in Yuma, Arizona.
- The first night game at Comiskey Park took place. The hometown Chicago White Sox defeated the St. Louis Browns 5-2.

== August 15, 1939 (Tuesday) ==
- The musical fantasy film The Wizard of Oz had its official premiere at Grauman's Chinese Theatre in Hollywood.
- Panama observed a holiday in celebration of the 25th anniversary of the opening of the Panama Canal. The SS Ancon, the first commercial vessel to go through the canal in 1914, repeated its historic voyage as 820 passengers cheered and an army band played.
- Indian troops arrived in Egypt to strengthen British forces there.
- U-boat commander Karl Dönitz received a coded instruction for his forces to put out to sea at once.
- José Félix Estigarribia became President of Paraguay.

== August 16, 1939 (Wednesday) ==
- A Polish soldier was killed 20 yards (18 m) inside the Danzig border. Polish sources said he had crossed over by mistake and was shot without receiving any kind of warning beforehand. In retaliation, Polish military guards were given orders to shoot on sight any uniformed German or Danzinger in Polish territory.
- The Anglo-French mission arrived in Moscow.
- Born:
  - Billy Joe Shaver, country musician; in Corsicana, Texas (d. 2020)
  - Carole Shelley, actress; in London, England (d. 2018)
  - Sir Trevor McDonald, British newsreader and journalist; in San Fernando, Trinidad and Tobago

== August 17, 1939 (Thursday) ==
- Hitler closed the border with Poland at Upper Silesia.
- The semi-official Polish newspaper Kurjer Poranny demanded confiscation of property held by German citizens in Poland in retaliation for the confiscation of property owned by Polish Jews in Germany.
- Born: Luther Allison, American blues guitarist; in Widener, Arkansas (d. 1997)

== August 18, 1939 (Friday) ==
- The Reich Interior Ministry ordered all physicians, nurses and midwives to report children under the age of three who showed signs of severe mental or physical disability. This was the first step in the Nazi Germany's child euthanasia programme.
- Died: William Demaine, 80, Australian newspaper editor and politician

== August 19, 1939 (Saturday) ==
- Hitler received a message from his ambassador in Moscow reporting that the Russians were prepared to meet with Joachim von Ribbentrop on August 27 or 28 to negotiate and sign a non-aggression pact. Hitler welcomed the news but wanted the date of von Ribbentrop's visit to be brought forward.
- Stalin's alleged speech of 19 August 1939: A secret meeting of the Politburo was allegedly held in which Joseph Stalin outlined the strategy of the Soviet Union in the upcoming war. Stalin supposedly said that the war among the Western powers should go on as long as possible so all belligerents would be weakened, creating an ideal opportunity for Soviet expansion.
- Italy barred entry to Jews from Germany, Poland, Hungary and Romania.
- Born: Ginger Baker, English drummer; in Lewisham, South London (d. 2019)

== August 20, 1939 (Sunday) ==
- Nazi Germany and the Soviet Union shocked the world when a trade pact between the two countries was announced.
- The Tientsin Blockade came to an end when the British handed over the accused killers that the Japanese wanted all along. The Japanese would execute the suspects. The handover coincided with a massive flood that submerged the streets and knocked out the city's power.
- From the Berghof, Hitler sent a message to Joseph Stalin proposing that von Ribbentrop go to Moscow no later than August 23, "in view of the international situation."
- Battles of Khalkhin Gol: Soviet general Georgy Zhukov launched a new attack with over 200 aircraft and as many as 500 tanks.

== August 21, 1939 (Monday) ==
- Stalin agreed to Hitler's proposal to have von Ribbentrop come to Moscow on August 23. Hitler, who was having dinner with Eva Braun and guests at the time the message arrived, pounded the table and exclaimed, "I have them! I have them!"
- The Soviet Union informed the Anglo-French mission that no military pact was possible unless Poland consented to having the Red Army pass through its territory. Since this condition was not acceptable, the negotiations were called off.
- Charlie Chaplin delayed production on his new film, tentatively called The Dictators, due to the uncertainty of the situation in Europe.
- Born: Clarence Williams III, American actor; in New York City (d. 2021)

== August 22, 1939 (Tuesday) ==
- Hitler gave the Obersalzberg Speech to commanders of the Wehrmacht, detailing the pending invasion of Poland and plans for extermination of the Poles, reportedly saying "Who, after all, speaks today of the annihilation of the Armenians?"
- Members of British Parliament were summoned back to London for a special session on Thursday.
- The song "You Are My Sunshine" was recorded for the first time, by the Pine Ridge Boys for Bluebird Records.
- Born:
  - Valerie Harper, American actress; in Suffern, New York (d. 2019)
  - Carl Yastrzemski, American baseball player; in Southampton, New York

== August 23, 1939 (Wednesday) ==
- The Molotov–Ribbentrop Pact was signed. Nazi Germany and the Soviet Union agreed not to attack each other and to remain neutral if attacked by a third power. Secret clauses in the pact divided up other countries into respective spheres of influence, including a partitioning of Poland.
- Carlos Quintanilla became the new President of Bolivia after Germán Busch's suicide.
- British racing driver John Cobb set a new land speed record of 369.741 miles per hour (595.040 km/h) at Bonneville Salt Flats in Utah. The record stood until 1947.
- The Seventh International Genetical Congress was convened in Edinburgh.
- Died:
  - Germán Busch, 35, President of Bolivia, died by suicide.
  - Sidney Howard, 48, American playwright, was crushed to death by a tractor on his farm.

== August 24, 1939 (Thursday) ==
- The Parliament of the United Kingdom passed the Emergency Powers (Defence) Act, giving the government broad powers in order to conduct war effectively.
- President Roosevelt appealed to King Victor Emmanuel III of Italy "to formulate proposals for a pacific solution of the present crisis."
- Pope Pius XII made a radio address to the entire world pleading for peace. "The danger is imminent, but there is yet time", the pontiff said. "Nothing is lost with peace; all may be with war. Let men return to mutual understanding. Let them begin negotiations anew. Conferring with goodwill and with respect for reciprocal rights they will find that to sincere and conscientious negotiators, an honourable solution is never precluded."
- Hermann Göring asked Birger Dahlerus to go to London as an unofficial envoy and tell the British to enter negotiations as soon as possible. Over the next several days Dahlerus would shuttle back and forth between London and Berlin relaying "off the record" messages separate from those delivered through official channels.
- Royal Auxiliary Air Force and Royal Air Force Volunteer Reserve embodied (merged into the RAF and brought to active service).

== August 25, 1939 (Friday) ==
- Germany cut off all telecommunication going beyond its borders.
- Hitler notified Benito Mussolini that war with Poland was imminent.
- At 12:45 p.m. Hitler summoned the British Ambassador to Germany Sir Nevile Henderson and talked with him for about an hour. Hitler said it was necessary to solve the Polish question once and for all and offered to make a pact with Britain guaranteeing the Empire's existence and potentially leading to an agreement on armaments limitation in the future.
- At 3:02 p.m. Hitler gave the order to invade Poland the next day.
- Benito Mussolini sent a telegram to Hitler informing him that Italy would remain neutral in a war between Germany and Poland.
- At 5:30 p.m. Hitler met the French Ambassador Robert Coulondre, who told Hitler that if Poland was attacked France would come to its aid.
- Poland and the United Kingdom signed the Agreement of Mutual Assistance, formalizing Britain's March 31 declaration of support for Poland.
- At 6:00 p.m., Joachim von Ribbentrop arrived with the news of the Anglo-Polish treaty. Hitler decided to postpone the invasion of Poland.
- Birger Dahlerus arrived in London and relayed the German message to Lord Halifax, who said official channels were open, thanked Dahlerus for his efforts and assured him that his services were no longer needed. Later that evening when Dahlerus telephoned Göring to let him know, Göring was adamant that Dahlerus had to do everything possible to arrange a conference between Britain and Germany.
- Jabłonków Incident: A group of German agents – unaware that the invasion of Poland had been postponed – attacked a rail station in Mosty overnight, but the attackers were repelled.
- Five people were killed and 70 were injured by an IRA bomb explosion in Coventry.
- The Louvre was closed to the public (officially for "repair work") so its art treasures could be packed up and transported to secret locations for safekeeping.
- The Wizard of Oz was released.

== August 26, 1939 (Saturday) ==
- The Cvetković–Maček Agreement established the Banovina of Croatia.
- The 1939 Nuremberg Rally, scheduled to begin September 2, was postponed indefinitely.
- Mussolini sent Hitler another message, this time expressing his desire to have Italy march side-by-side with Germany. Attached to the message was an unrealistically long list of war materials Italy would require from Germany, knowing there was no way Germany could supply it. When the German officials asked the Italian ambassador when delivery was expected, he flatly replied "immediately before the beginning of hostilities".
- Nevile Henderson flew back to London to relay Hitler's offer to the British government.
- Nazi Germany announced rationing of shoes, textiles and certain foodstuffs. Every German resident would require a ration card for purchases.
- Birger Dahlerus met with Lord Halifax a second time and convinced him to write a letter expressing Britain's desire to reach a peaceful settlement. Dahlerus flew back to Berlin and gave the letter to Göring that night, who declared that Hitler must be informed immediately of its contents. Dahlerus accepted Göring's invitation to come to the Chancellory and meet Hitler for the first time, despite the lateness of the hour.
- German submarine U-43 was commissioned.
- The Zionist paramilitary organization Irgun assassinated Ralph Cairns, 31, commander of the Jewish Section of the Palestine Police Force's Criminal Investigation Department, and Inspector Ronald Barker of the Arab Affairs division, in Rehavia, Jerusalem. Irgun member Haim Corfu, a future Israeli politician, killed Cairns and Barker by remotely detonating a land mine containing 15 kilograms (33 lb) of blasting gelatin and 5 kilograms (11 lb) of shrapnel.
- The first televised major league baseball game was broadcast on W2XBS. An estimated 3,000 viewers watched the Brooklyn Dodgers and the Cincinnati Reds split a doubleheader at Ebbets Field.

== August 27, 1939 (Sunday) ==
- Hitler was woken up just after midnight and met with Birger Dahlerus and Göring. Dahlerus later recalled Hitler as appearing glassy-eyed and highly agitated, at one point going on a bizarre rambling monologue repetitively asserting that Germany could win a rapid war and that he would "build U-boats, build U-boats, U-boats, U-boats, U-boats" and "airplanes, airplanes, airplanes, and I shall annihilate my enemies." After calming down Hitler laid out a set of proposals more detailed than Nevile Henderson had been given, which included annexation of Danzig and the Polish Corridor. Dahlerus flew back to London, conferred with Halifax and Chamberlain and then flew back to Germany that same day to relay Britain's mixed reaction to the proposals.
- The Heinkel He 178, the world's first aircraft to fly under turbojet power, had its first flight in Rostock-Marienehe, Germany. The pilot was Erich Warsitz.
- In a famous football match known in Poland as The Last Game, Poland defeated the renowned Hungarian team 4-2 in the greatest Polish football victory up to that time.

== August 28, 1939 (Monday) ==
- The Tarnów rail station bomb attack was carried out in southern Poland. A time bomb left by a German agent exploded, killing 20 and wounding 35.
- Berliners anticipating more rationing made the greatest run on food stores in decades.
- Nevile Henderson flew back to Berlin with his government's official reply. Britain was prepared to take Hitler's proposals as "subjects for discussion" and agreed that there must be settlement of differences between Germany and Poland, but noted that everything turned "upon the nature of the settlement and the method by which it is to be reached." Germany was reminded that "His Majesty's Government have obligations to Poland by which they are bound and which they intend to honour. They could not, for any advantage offered to Great Britain, acquiesce in a settlement which put in jeopardy the independence of a State to whom they have given their guarantee." Britain suggested that the next step "should be the initiation of direct discussions between the German and Polish Governments on a basis which would include the principles stated above, namely, the safeguarding of Poland's essential interests and the securing of the settlement by an international guarantee." The reply concluded with a warning that failure to reach a settlement "would ruin the hopes of better understanding between Germany and Great Britain, would bring the two countries into conflict, and might well plunge the whole world into war. Such an outcome would be a calamity without parallel in history."
- Hitler read a German translation of the British government's note and told Henderson he was willing to negotiate, but Poland could not be reasoned with. Henderson firmly replied that Hitler would have to choose between war with Poland or friendship with Britain. Hitler said he would prepare a written reply of his own.
- The border between Germany and France was closed.

== August 29, 1939 (Tuesday) ==
- Neville Chamberlain addressed the House of Commons on the international situation and spoke in general terms of the discussions that had been going on with Germany. "The British people are said sometimes to be slow to make up their minds, but, having made them up, they do not readily let go", Chamberlain said in conclusion. "The issue of peace or war is still undecided, and we still will hope, and still will work, for peace; but we will abate no jot of our resolution to hold fast to the line which we have laid down for ourselves."
- Jozef Tiso declared martial law in Slovakia. Articles were posted ordering Slovaks to accept German currency and furnish food to the German soldiers "here to protect our young state against the threatening Polish danger."
- Peking Plan: Three Polish destroyers departed from Poland and headed to the United Kingdom so they would not be sunk or captured in a German invasion.
- Rome conducted two test blackouts (one at 8 p.m. and one at 10 p.m.) lasting a few minutes each.
- Hitler's reply to Britain arrived that night. He demanded the return of Danzig and the Polish Corridor and wrote that Germany could "no longer share" Britain's view that "these grave differences can be resolved by way of direct negotiations." Despite this, Hitler wrote, Germany was prepared to enter direct discussions "to give the British Government and the British nation a proof of the sincerity of Germany's intentions to enter into a lasting friendship with Great Britain."
- Born: Joel Schumacher, American filmmaker; in New York City (d. 2020)

== August 30, 1939 (Wednesday) ==
- The Polish government ordered a partial mobilization.
- Nobuyuki Abe became Prime Minister of Japan.
- Nevile Henderson handed Joachim von Ribbentrop the British government's reply at midnight. "His Majesty's Government repeat that they reciprocate the German Government's desire for improved relations, but it will be recognised that they could not sacrifice the interests of other friends in order to obtain that improvement", the note explained. "They fully understand that the German Government cannot sacrifice Germany's vital interests, but the Polish Government are in the same position and His Majesty's Government believe that the vital interests of the two countries are not incompatible." The note expressed "reservation in regard to the statement of the particular demands put forward" by Germany, but said that German proposals would be "fully examined" during discussions.
- Henri Guisan was elected General of the Swiss Army, with a mandate to safeguard the independence and defend the territory of the nation in case of war.
- Liechtenstein declared its neutrality in all future conflicts via diplomatic representation through Switzerland.
- Born:
  - Elizabeth Ashley, American actress; in Ocala, Florida
  - John Peel, English disc jockey; in Heswall (d. 2004)
- Died: Wilhelm Bölsche, 78, German author and editor

== August 31, 1939 (Thursday) ==
- The Supreme Soviet of the Soviet Union ratified the Molotov–Ribbentrop Pact.
- The Royal Navy was mobilized and Army and Royal Air Force reserves were called up.
- At 11:07 a.m., an official order was given in Britain to evacuate civilians from cities and towns that were likely targets for enemy bombing. Most of the evacuees were schoolchildren. Over the next few days nearly 3 million people would be relocated.
- At 12:30 p.m., Hitler issued Directive No. 1, ordering an attack on Poland to begin September 1 at 04:45. "Now that all the political possibilities of disposing by peaceful means of a situation on the Eastern Frontier which is intolerable for Germany are exhausted, I have determined on a solution by force", the directive read.
- At 6:15 p.m. Joachim von Ribbentrop met with Polish ambassador Józef Lipski, more than five hours after Lipski had requested an audience. Lipski said the Polish government would be making a formal reply about direct negotiations in the next few hours. Ribbentrop asked him if he was empowered to negotiate, and when Lipski replied that for the time being he was not, Ribbentrop dismissed him. Lipski returned to the embassy and found that his telephone line had been cut.
- Gleiwitz incident: In a false flag operation, Nazis posing as Poles seized the Gleiwitz radio station and broadcast an anti-German message in Polish.
- At 9:00 p.m. German radio interrupted regular programming to present the government's 16-point proposal for Poland. The demand for the restoration of Danzig to the Reich was maintained, but the question of the Polish Corridor was now to be settled by a plebiscite. Warsaw never heard the proposal because communications between the two countries were cut off.
- The first issue of Marvel Comics (cover date October) was published by Timely Comics, the predecessor of the Marvel Comics publisher of today. Issue #1 included the first appearances of the characters Sub-Mariner and the Human Torch.
- The comedy-drama film The Women starring Norma Shearer, Joan Crawford and Rosalind Russell premiered at Grauman's Chinese Theatre in Hollywood.
- The final missionaries of the Church of Jesus Christ of Latter Day Saints leave Germany and are evacuated though Denmark.
