= May 1939 =

Month of 1939

<<	May 1939					>>
Su	Mo	Tu	We	Th	Fr	Sa
	1	2	3	4	5	6
7	8	9	10	11	12	13
14	15	16	17	18	19	20
21	22	23	24	25	26	27
28	29	30	31

The following events occurred in May 1939:

== May 1, 1939 (Monday) ==
- During May Day celebrations at the Olympiastadion in Berlin, Adolf Hitler spoke of an "international clique of war agitators" trying to encircle Germany and declared, "If we want to survive we must be unified."
- Born: Judy Collins, singer and songwriter, in Seattle

== May 2, 1939 (Tuesday) ==
- A law went into effect in Slovakia depriving 30,000 Jews of their citizenship.
- Lou Gehrig of the New York Yankees went to manager Joe McCarthy before a game against the Detroit Tigers and asked to be benched. Gehrig's major league record consecutive games played streak ended at 2,130.
- Born: Taomati Iuta, politician, on Beru Island (d. 2016)
- Died: Phillips Smalley, 73, American film actor and director

== May 3, 1939 (Wednesday) ==
- Vyacheslav Molotov became the new Foreign Affairs Minister of the Soviet Union.
- A Gallup poll found that 84 percent of Americans surveyed believed that the United States should stay out of a European war.
- The All India Forward Bloc was created as a left-wing alternative to the Indian National Congress.

== May 4, 1939 (Thursday) ==
- The novel Finnegans Wake by James Joyce was published.
- Born: Paul Gleason, actor, in Jersey City, New Jersey (d. 2006)

== May 5, 1939 (Friday) ==
- Dorothy Garrod was elected Disney Professor of Archaeology at the University of Cambridge, the first woman to hold a professorship at either Cambridge or Oxford.

== May 6, 1939 (Saturday) ==
- Johnstown won the Kentucky Derby.

== May 7, 1939 (Sunday) ==
- Italy and Germany announced their intention of signing a military alliance to "contribute effectively to assuring peace in Europe."
- Born: Sidney Altman, molecular biologist and Nobel laureate, in Montreal, Quebec, Canada (d. 2022); Ruud Lubbers, Prime Minister of the Netherlands, in Rotterdam (d. 2018)

== May 8, 1939 (Monday) ==
- Britain offered to mediate in the German-Polish dispute over Danzig.

== May 9, 1939 (Tuesday) ==
- The Battle of Nanchang ended in Japanese victory.
- Francoist Spain announced its withdrawal from the League of Nations.
- Born: Ralph Boston, track athlete, in Laurel, Mississippi (d. 2023); Pierre Desproges, humorist, in Pantin, France (d. 1988)

== May 10, 1939 (Wednesday) ==
- The Henry Miller novel Tropic of Capricorn was officially released in France. It was banned in the United States until a court ruling in 1961.
- Died: James Parrott, 41, American actor and film director (heart attack)

== May 11, 1939 (Thursday) ==
- The Battles of Khalkhin Gol began.
- A grand review of the Italian Navy was conducted in the Gulf of Naples for Prince Paul of Yugoslavia on the occasion of his state visit.
- Born: Milt Pappas, baseball player, in Detroit, Michigan (d. 2016); Dante Tiñga, politician and jurist, in Taguig, Philippines

== May 12, 1939 (Friday) ==
- Britain and Turkey announced a mutual aid agreement in the event of aggression or war.
- Born: Ron Ziegler, White House Press Secretary, in Covington, Kentucky (d. 2003)

== May 13, 1939 (Saturday) ==
- The German ocean liner MS St. Louis departed Hamburg for Cuba with 936 passengers, mostly Jewish refugees. The Cuban government had already canceled their landing certificates, but many passengers boarded the ship anyway hoping the Cubans would honor the certificates they had already obtained.
- Born: Harvey Keitel, actor and producer, in Brooklyn, New York
- Died: Stanisław Leśniewski, 53, Polish mathematician, philosopher and logician

== May 14, 1939 (Sunday) ==
- Adolf Hitler arrived in Aachen to conduct an inspection of the Siegfried Line.
- Born: Veruschka von Lehndorff, model, actress and artist, in Königsberg, East Prussia

== May 15, 1939 (Monday) ==
- Benito Mussolini attended the inauguration of a new military airfield in Caselle Torinese, barely 25 air miles from the French border.
- Ravensbrück concentration camp opened.
- Eva Braun began being mentioned in the international press. In an article in Time speculating about the love lives of Hitler and Mussolini, Braun was identified as someone that Hitler always came to visit whenever he was in Munich.
- The U.S. Supreme Court decided United States v. Miller.
- The romantic drama film Goodbye, Mr. Chips premiered in the United Kingdom.

== May 16, 1939 (Tuesday) ==
- The first food stamps in United States history were distributed in Rochester, New York.
- The first night game in the history of baseball's American League was played at Shibe Park in Philadelphia. The hometown Athletics lost to the Cleveland Indians, 8–3.

== May 17, 1939 (Wednesday) ==
- The British government issued a White Paper on Mandatory Palestine. The new plan would set immigration quotas that would put the Jewish population at one-third of the region's total population.
- The royal tour of Canada began. King George VI and Queen Elizabeth arrived in Quebec City, Canada at the beginning of their North American tour. It was the first time a British monarch had visited Canada.
- The first television broadcast in Japan occurred.
- NBC broadcast the first televised sporting event in North America, a baseball game between Princeton and Columbia.

== May 18, 1939 (Thursday) ==
- Jews rioted in Jerusalem against the White Paper, resulting in about 100 injuries.
- Giovanni Valetti of Italy won the Giro d'Italia.

== May 19, 1939 (Friday) ==
- For the first time in history a British monarch sat in the Senate of Canada. George VI gave Royal Assent to several bills.
- The Trades Union Congress decided not to oppose the British government's conscription plans.
- Born: Livio Berruti, track and field athlete, in Turin, Italy; Sonny Fortune, jazz saxophonist and flautist, in Philadelphia, Pennsylvania (d. 2018); James Fox, actor, in London, England; Nancy Kwan, actress, in Hong Kong; Dick Scobee, astronaut, in Cle Elum, Washington (d. 1986)

== May 20, 1939 (Saturday) ==
- Pan-American Airways began regular air mail service between the United States and Europe.
- Queen Elizabeth laid the cornerstone for the new Canadian Supreme Court building.
- A group of German SA stormtroopers attacked and ransacked a Polish customs house in Kalthof. One of the SA men, Gustav Gruebner, was shot and killed by a Polish chauffeur during the incident.
- Died: Joseph Carr, 58, President of the National Football League

== May 21, 1939 (Sunday) ==
- George VI dedicated Canada's National War Memorial.
- Born: Heinz Holliger, oboist, composer and conductor, in Langenthal, Switzerland

== May 22, 1939 (Monday) ==
- Germany and Italy signed a ten-year military and political alliance known as the Pact of Steel.
- The King and Queen of England met the Dionne quintuplets in Toronto, Ontario, Canada.
- The U.S. Supreme Court decided Lane v. Wilson.
- Born: Paul Winfield, actor, in Los Angeles (d. 2004)
- Died: Ernst Toller, 45, German playwright (suicide)

== May 23, 1939 (Tuesday) ==
- A constitutional referendum was held in Denmark. 91.9% of voters approved of a new constitution, but only 48.9% of eligible voters turned up to vote, meaning the percentage of voters who approved of the new constitution fell below the 45% required.
- The American submarine Squalus dove during a routine test run off Portsmouth, New Hampshire and failed to surface due to a faulty valve. Rescue efforts based from the USS Brooklyn soon got underway.
- Born: Reinhard Hauff, film director, in Marburg, Germany

== May 24, 1939 (Wednesday) ==
- The Battle of Suixian–Zaoyang ended in Chinese victory.
- In Winnipeg, King George VI gave a radio address broadcast around the world extolling the century of peace between Canada and the United States.
- Blue Peter won The Derby. The race was televised live in six major London theaters.
- The Albanian-Italian newspaper Fashizmi was founded.
- Died: Witmer Stone, 72, American ornithologist and botanist

== May 25, 1939 (Thursday) ==
- German American Bund leader Fritz Julius Kuhn was arrested on charges of forgery and grand larceny.
- Born: Dixie Carter, actress, in McLemoresville, Tennessee (d. 2010); Ian McKellen, actor, in Burnley, Lancashire, England

== May 26, 1939 (Friday) ==
- Rescue efforts in the Squalus disaster were called off. All 33 surviving crew members were rescued but 26 others in the after part of the ship had already drowned.
- The Military Training Act received Royal Assent.
- Born: Brent Musburger, sportscaster, in Portland, Oregon

== May 27, 1939 (Saturday) ==
- The MS St. Louis reached Havana, but only 22 passengers were allowed to disembark.
- Born: Rick Rescorla, British-American war hero and 9/11 victim, in Hayle, Cornwall (d. 2001)
- Died: Alfred A. Cunningham, 58, American aviator; Joseph Roth, 44, Austrian-Jewish journalist and novelist

== May 28, 1939 (Sunday) ==
- The Yugoslav adventure comic strip Zigomar first appeared.

== May 29, 1939 (Monday) ==
- Two days of parliamentary elections concluded in Hungary. The Party of Hungarian Life (previously the Party of National Unity) won another majority. The fascist Arrow Cross Party finished second.
- The U.S. Supreme Court decided Perkins v. Elg.
- Born: Al Unser, auto racing driver, in Albuquerque, New Mexico (d. 2021)

== May 30, 1939 (Tuesday) ==
- Wilbur Shaw won the Indianapolis 500.
- Born: Michael J. Pollard, actor, in Passaic, New Jersey (d. 2019)
- Died: Floyd Roberts, 39, American racing driver (killed in crash at the Indianapolis 500)

== May 31, 1939 (Wednesday) ==
- Germany signed a non-aggression pact with Denmark.
- Celebrations were held in Hamburg for 5,000 German fighters returning from the Spanish Civil War. Hermann Göring ceremonially distributed medals to the veterans, including 36 gold crosses for extraordinary valour.
