= Georges Ricard-Cordingley =

French painter

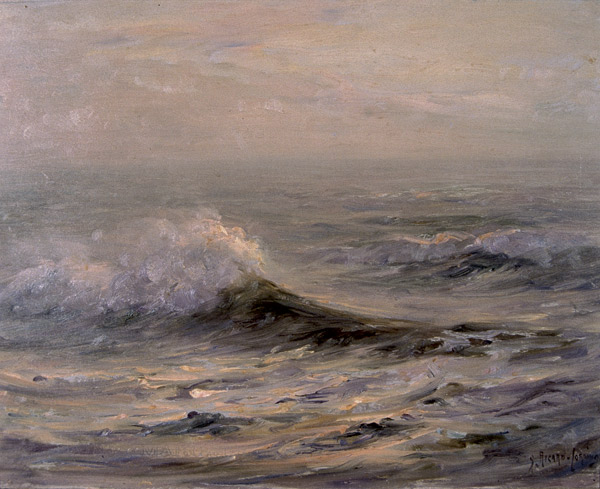
Vague bondissante (1930)

A painter and traveller, Georges Ricard-Cordingley (1873–1939) constantly searched for an original contact with the world of sea.

== Biography ==
- 1873 - January 30 : Georges Ricard born in Lyon, to parents Prosper Louis Ricard and Georgina Marie Cordingley. Childhood spent chiefly in Lyon and Boulogne-sur-Mer; quickly displays a gift for drawing.
- 1875, Death of his father.
- 1887, Becomes student of Jean-Charles Cazin (1840–1901), landscape artist in Pas-de-Calais.
- 1888–1889, Attends School of Fine Arts, Lyon
- 1890, Enrolls in Académie Julian, Paris; studies under Jean-Joseph Benjamin-Constant, Louis Martinet, and Jules Lefèvre.
- 1892, Death of his mother; Georges is 19. Stays with mother's relatives during trip to England, adopts the surname Cordingley.

First voyage to the North Sea with the Fishermen's Mission. First studies for seascapes.

- 1894, Paintings very well received in Queen Victoria’s court.
- 1895, Second trip to North Sea. Produces studies of waves, clouds. Also paints myriad fishermen's portraits, portscapes.

Works exhibited in Paris and London.

- 1896, Third voyage to North Sea; continues across Atlantic with a French mission to seafarers. Shipwreck in Newfoundland.
- 1901, Establishes studio in Boulogne-sur-Mer.

Divides time between London, Paris, and Boulogne. Paints portraits and seascapes.

- 1903, Responsible for ornamentation of Wimereux Casino (Pas-de-Calais).
- 1909–1910, Voyage and exhibitions in Australia.
- 1911, Marries Suzanne Giraud-Teulon, later the mother of his three children:

Éliane (1913–1945), Louis (1917–1942) and Gabrielle (born 1924).

- 1914–1918, Assigned to work as ambulance attendant in Lyon. Continues drawing.
- 1918, Moves to Villa des Enfants in Cannes; buys Villa René on Boulevard Sainte-Beuve in Boulogne-sur-Mer.
- 1924–1928, Buys a house in Neuilly-sur-Seine.

Divides time between the Parisian suburb, Cannes and Boulogne. Takes many trips Normandy, Brittany, the Mediterranean, North Africa. Exhibits work in and around Paris, Cannes, and Boulogne. Also travels to lake regions in Switzerland, Italy and France.

- 1928–1930, Trips to the Netherlands, Basque Country, North Sea.
- 1931–1934, Trips to North Africa, notably to Morocco, where he exhibited work in 1934.

Winters in Cannes, summers in Boulogne-sur-Mer.

- 1935, Continues to paint in Cannes. Travels to Spain and Portugal.
- 1936, Moves to Mougins, then to Cannet, to be near the sea.
- 1939 - April 25: death in Cannes following a cerebral hemorrhage.

== Work ==
Georges Ricard-Cordingley was among the few maritime painters born in Lyon. His interest in the esoteric, his writings on art, and his handling of mist in seascapes associate him with the Lyonnais school of painting. He has been described as a painter of muted greys, a palette associated with both the Lyonnais and London schools. Lyon and London were the cities where he first achieved recognition. He later worked in Boulogne-sur-Mer and Cannes. He worked across oils, watercolours and charcoals.

From Pierre Miquel (1921–2002) art historian, Cordingley expert
