= Qualls, Oklahoma =

- Unincorporated community
- Location within the state of Oklahoma Qualls (the United States)
- Coordinates: 35°43′13″N 95°1′59″W
- Country: United States
- State: Oklahoma
- County: Cherokee
- Elevation: 712 ft (217 m)
- Time zone: UTC-6 (Central (CST))
  - Summer (DST): UTC-5 (CDT)
- GNIS feature ID: 1100771

Qualls is an unincorporated community in Cherokee County, Oklahoma, United States. It is west of Lake Tenkiller.

The Qualls Post Office existed from January 20, 1909, until August 31, 1942. The first postmaster was William A. Qualls. One story is that sometime after the arrival of the Ross Party, who traveled the Trail of Tears due to the Indian relocation in 1838, a cabin owned by a family named Qualls was burned to the ground by the Cherokee Lighthorse police and that event gave birth to the area name "Qualls Burnt Cabin." Sometime between World War I and World War II, that original name was shortened in common usage to the present "Qualls". Qualls Road and Burnt Cabin Road remain on the present maps of the area to memorialize that history. The name is further memorialized in Burnt Cabin Ridge State Park on the shores of Lake Tenkiller.

Today, "downtown" Qualls is defined by Jincy's Kitchen, a home-cooking diner now operating in a building formerly used as a set in two movies, including "Where the Red Fern Grows".

== Notable people ==
- Johnny Callison (1939-2006).
