= Johnny Callison =

American baseball player (1939–2006)

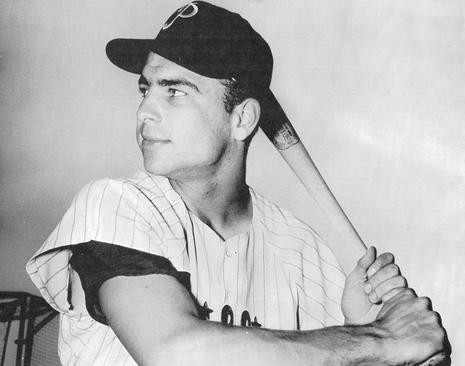
- Callison in 1961
- Right fielder
- Born: March 12, 1939; Qualls, Oklahoma, U.S.
- Died: October 12, 2006 (aged 67); Abington, Pennsylvania, U.S.
- Batted: Left Threw: Right

MLB debut
- September 9, 1958, for the Chicago White Sox

Last MLB appearance
- August 17, 1973, for the New York Yankees

MLB statistics
- Batting average: .264
- Home runs: 226
- Runs batted in: 840
- Stats at Baseball Reference

Teams
- Chicago White Sox (1958–1959); Philadelphia Phillies (1960–1969); Chicago Cubs (1970–1971); New York Yankees (1972–1973)

Career highlights and awards
- 4× All-Star (1962, 1962², 1964, 1965); Philadelphia Phillies Wall of Fame

John Wesley Callison (March 12, 1939 – October 12, 2006) was an American professional baseball player. He played in Major League Baseball (MLB) for 16 seasons and is best known for the 10 years he spent with the Philadelphia Phillies as a right fielder, from 1960 through 1969. He was an All-Star for three seasons and four All-Star games. (Note: MLB held two All-Star Games each season from 1959 through 1962.) He led the National League (NL) in triples twice and doubles once, and gained his greatest prominence in the 1964 season in which he was named the MVP of the All-Star Game and he was the runner-up for the NL Most Valuable Player Award. He also led the NL in outfield assists four consecutive times and in double plays once, and ended his career among the top five Phillies in home runs (185) and triples (84).

== Early years ==
Born in Qualls, Oklahoma, Callison batted left-handed and threw right-handed. He was signed by the Chicago White Sox out of East Bakersfield High School in 1957, being assigned to the Class-C Bakersfield Bears in the California League, where he had a .340 batting average with 17 home runs and 31 stolen bases. The next season, he was advanced to the Triple-A Indianapolis Indians, where he led the American Association in home runs. In September 1958, he was recalled by the White Sox, where he had a .297 batting average in 18 games.

In 1959, Callison split time between Chicago and Indianapolis. He was not on the World Series roster when the White Sox lost the series to the Los Angeles Dodgers, and in December he was traded to the Phillies for third baseman Gene Freese.

== Baseball career ==
Callison became a fan favorite in Philadelphia; Supreme Court Justice and lifelong Phillies fan Samuel Alito recalls he "adopted Johnny Callison out there in right field" as a boy. Over the next decade, Callison would be named to the NL All-Star roster three times (1962, 64-65). In 1962, he batted an even .300, the only time he would reach that mark, and led the NL with 10 triples. On June 27, 1963, he hit for the cycle against the Pittsburgh Pirates.

The 1964 season became best remembered, however, for the Phillies' late-season collapse; despite a 6 1/2-game lead with 12 games to play, the Phillies lost 10 in a row and finished one game behind the St. Louis Cardinals. Manager Gene Mauch was criticized for his handling of the pitching staff over the final two weeks, but players such as slugging rookie third baseman Richie Allen also drew harsh treatment. Callison was 12-for-48 during the last 12 games, including a 3-homer game on September 27 against the Milwaukee Braves which the Phillies still lost 14–8, dropping them out of first place for the first time since July. With the Phillies behind by two on September 29, Callison did not start because he had the flu with chills and fever. However, Callison pinch-hit late in the game and managed a single. He reached first base and would not come out, so the Cardinals and the umpires allowed him to wear his Phillies jacket on the base paths, against MLB rules; due to his high fever, Callison needed help from Bill White to button his jacket. Despite the disappointing second-place finish for Philadelphia, Callison ended the year third in the league in home runs (31) and fifth in runs batted in (104). He earned two first-place votes for the MVP Award, won by Ken Boyer of the World Series champion Cardinals. In the 1964 All-Star Game at Shea Stadium in New York on July 7, Callison hit a game-winning walk-off home run off Red Sox pitcher Dick Radatz with two out in the ninth inning, a three-run shot to right field to give the NL a 7–4 victory; it was only the third walk-off home run in All-Star history (and the last one as of 2022), with Callison joining legends Ted Williams and Stan Musial in baseball annals.

In 1965, Callison again led the NL with a career-high 16 triples, once more topping 30 home runs and 100 RBI; on June 6, he hit three home runs against the Cubs and the Phillies won 10-9. In 1966, he paced the league with 40 doubles. Callison also is remembered for being an excellent outfielder with a formidable throwing arm. He led the NL in fielding average as a right fielder in 1963 and 1964, and his throwing accuracy helped him lead the NL in outfield assists (24) and double plays (7) in 1962 and he topped the league in assists the next three years with totals of 26, 19, and 21. But his power production fell off sharply, and he failed to collect 20 homers or 65 RBI in any of his last four Phillies seasons. After the 1969 season, he was traded to the Cubs, and he posted 1970 totals of 19 home runs and 68 RBI before hitting only .210 in 1971 with just 8 home runs. In January 1972 he was traded to the New York Yankees, and he found limited playing time over two years, closing his career with a .176 average, one home run, and 10 RBI in 45 games in 1973.

Callison was a career .264 hitter with 226 home runs, 926 runs, 840 RBI, 1,757 hits, 321 doubles, 89 triples, and 74 stolen bases in 1,886 games. He recorded a .984 fielding percentage at all three outfield positions.

== Life after baseball ==
Callison was a player-coach with the Philadelphia Athletics, a professional softball team that played at Veterans Stadium in the 1978 season of the American Professional Slo-Pitch League (APSPL).

Callison would remain in Philadelphia where he made frequent appearances and had several business ventures.

== Death ==
A resident of Glenside, a northern suburb of Philadelphia, Callison died in 2006 in Abington, Pennsylvania.

== MLB awards and achievements ==
- MLB All-Star MVP (1964)
- NL All-Star (1962, 1964–65)
- NL Leader in Doubles (1966)
- NL Leader in Triples (1962, 1965)
- NL Leader in Fielding Average as Right Fielder (1963, 1964)

== Other honors ==
- In 1997, he was named to the Philadelphia Baseball Wall of Fame.
- In 2012, he was inducted posthumously into the Philadelphia Sports Hall of Fame.

== See also ==
- Major League Baseball All-Star Game MVP Award
- List of Major League Baseball annual doubles leaders
- List of Major League Baseball annual triples leaders
- List of Major League Baseball career home run leaders
- List of Major League Baseball players to hit for the cycle

Achievements
Preceded by Lou Clinton	Hitting for the cycle June 27, 1963	Succeeded by Jim Hickman
