= Kate Ker-Lane =

Clothing companies of England

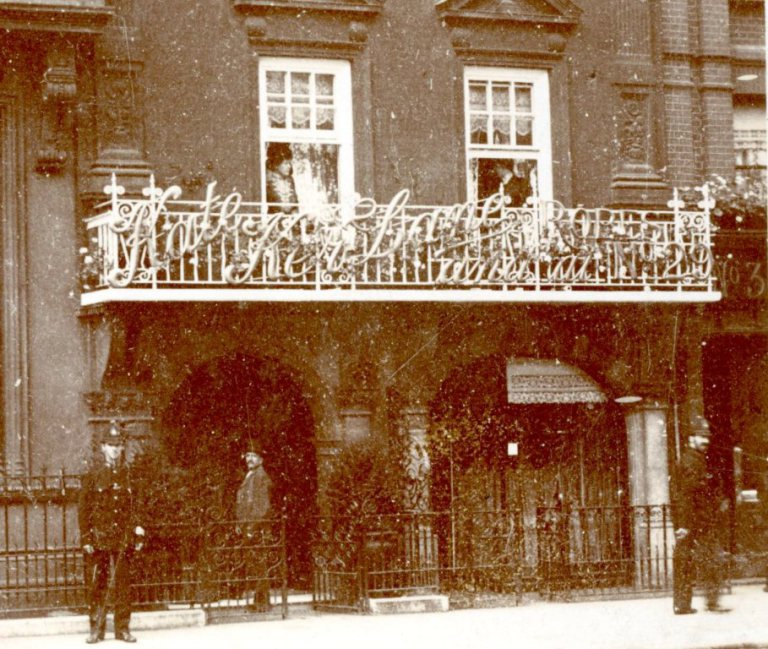
Kate Ker-Lane's shop at 29 Kensington High Street, London.

Catherine Ker-Lane (née Rowles; bapt. 31 March 1861 – 14 July 1939) was a successful society dressmaker and businesswoman of the late nineteenth and early twentieth centuries who traded as Madame Kate Ker-Lane's Court Dress Emporium in Kensington, London, but was noted for the poor conditions in which her staff worked.

== Early life ==
Ker-Lane was born in Bisley, Gloucestershire, in 1861, to Henry Rowles, a miller, and his wife, Harriet, who were both also born in Bisley. At the time of the 1861 census, the family were living in France Lynch near Stroud, and in 1871 at Barton St Mary, Gloucestershire. By 1881 they were living in Bisley again and her father was a "farmer of 36 acres".

== First marriage ==
In 1881 she married Thomas Samuel Lapington at St Michael's parish church in Gloucester and became Kate Lapington. In June 1886, according to Kate, her husband abandoned her and two months later she sued for divorce on the grounds of his cruelty, adultery, and desertion. The case was heard in 1889 after sufficient time had elapsed to prove the abandonment. The suit was undefended and the marriage dissolved.

== Career ==
In 1905 she was visited by a factory inspector who recorded that she employed 43 needlewomen and machinists at her small premises at 3 Kensington High Street, all women, eleven on the top floor, sixteen on the third, twelve on the second, one on the first, two at ground level and one in the basement. The inspector reported "This is a very dangerous case, there is hardly any light on the stairs and in some places no handrails".

She later had a shop known as Madame Kate Ker-Lane's Court Dress Emporium at 29 Kensington High Street.

She was regularly written about in positive terms by London American News.

In 1921 she was operating from 46 Hogarth Road, Earls Court, London. SW5, which was also her address at the time of her death. In 1922, a dress made by Ker-Lane was worn by Lady (Robert) Balfour at court. The Times described it as "a black velvet gown, embroidered with a running design of thistles in cut jet and bugles: under-bodice of Brussels lace. jet train. lined with satin beauté; ornaments. diamonds and sapphires." Soon after, Mrs Crookshank wore a Ker-Lane dress to court which was described as "Brussels point lace over pale gold tissue: train of white satin, embroidered in hand-worked lattice design of flowers in gold thread. Ornaments: diamonds and pearls."

== Death and legacy ==
Ker-Lane died, single, on 14 July 1939 at Thatched Cottage, Green Lane, Hardwicke, Gloucestershire. Her home address at the time of her death was 46 Hogarth Road, Earls Court. She left an estate of £2,071 and probate was granted in London to Thomas Marshall Sinclair, company secretary, and Reginald Victor Rowles, company director.
