= Trinidad and Tobago Red Cross Society =

- Founded: 12 July 1939
- Type: Non-governmental organization
- Purpose: Humanitarian and Disaster Management
- Location(s): Port of Spain (Headquarters and Northern Branch, San Fernando (Southern Branch), Signal Hill (Tobago branch)
- Region served: Trinidad and Tobago
- Website: ttrcs.org

The Trinidad and Tobago Red Cross Society (TTRCS) was founded on 12 July 1939 as a Branch of the British Red Cross Society. It has its headquarters in Port of Spain, with branches in the North and South of the island of Trinidad and one branch on the island of Tobago. Following the attainment of independence in 1962, the TTRCS became an Independent Society by Act No. 15 of 1963. On 8 August 1963, the TTRCS became part of the International Committee of the Red Cross and the International Federation of Red Cross and Red Crescent Societies. The Constitution of the Trinidad and Tobago Red Cross Society is based on the Geneva Conventions of 1949 and their additional Protocols of 1977 and the Fundamental Principles of the Red Cross Red Crescent Movement which are:

• Humanity
• Impartiality
• Neutrality
• Independence
• Voluntary Service
• Unity
• Universality

The TTRCS is made up of several departments with programmes grouped into six core areas:

• Promoting Humanitarian Principles and Values
• Disaster Preparedness and Response
• Health and Care in the Community
• HIV and AIDS information/ education
• Youth Activities
• Restoring family contacts

The TTRCS is an auxiliary in the humanitarian field to the Government of the Republic of Trinidad & Tobago.

Governance

The Trinidad and Tobago Red Cross is controlled and administered by a General Council which represents the Society as a whole. The General Council has 36 members, some appointed and some elected. 18 are members of the Executive Committee, which governs the Trinidad and Tobago Red Cross Society.
