= June 1939 =

Month of 1939

<<	June 1939					>>
Su	Mo	Tu	We	Th	Fr	Sa
				1	2	3
4	5	6	7	8	9	10
11	12	13	14	15	16	17
18	19	20	21	22	23	24
25	26	27	28	29	30

The following events occurred in June 1939:

== June 1, 1939 (Thursday) ==
- The submarine HMS Thetis sank during trials off Liverpool with the loss of 99 lives.
- Prince Paul of Yugoslavia and wife Olga began a five-day visit to Berlin.
- Cuban President Federico Laredo Brú ordered the MS St. Louis to leave Cuban waters and threatened to use gunboats if it did not do so.
- Born: Cleavon Little, actor, in Chickasha, Oklahoma (d. 1992)

== June 2, 1939 (Friday) ==
- The St. Louis left Havana.

== June 3, 1939 (Saturday) ==
- A treaty was signed in Rome giving Italy the right to manage Albania's foreign affairs and represent Albania abroad.
- Britain's first conscripts under the Military Training Act were enrolled.

== June 4, 1939 (Sunday) ==
- A spokesman for the U.S. Federal Communications Commission announced a revision of rules governing international broadcasters. Beginning November 1, stations broadcasting to other countries were required to "promote international goodwill, understanding and co-operation" in their programming.
- Georgy Zhukov, arrives in Kharkin Gol, he takes control of the Russian troops fighting the Japanese at the battle of Kharkin Gol.
- Died: Tommy Ladnier, 39, American jazz trumpeter

== June 5, 1939 (Monday) ==
- An attempt was made on the life of Marina, Duchess of Kent. As her car was pulling away from her home in Belgrave Square to see Wuthering Heights at the cinema, a man fired a sawn-off shotgun at it, but missed. The man was soon arrested and the Duchess was not aware of the attack until she returned.
- The U.S. Supreme Court decided Coleman v. Miller and Hague v. Committee for Industrial Organization.
- Born: Ron Baensch, racing cyclist, in Melbourne, Australia (d. 2017); Joe Clark, 16th Prime Minister of Canada, in High River, Alberta; Margaret Drabble, novelist and biographer, in Sheffield, United Kingdom

== June 6, 1939 (Tuesday) ==
- The very first Little League Baseball game was played in Williamsport, Pennsylvania. Lundy Lumber defeated Lycoming Dairy, 23–8.
- Born: Louis Andriessen, composer and pianist, in Utrecht, Netherlands (d. 2021); Gary U.S. Bonds, singer, in Jacksonville, Florida; Eddie Giacomin, ice hockey player, in Sudbury, Ontario, Canada (d. 2025); Joachim Wendler, aquanaut, in Erfurt, Germany (d. 1975); Richard "Popcorn" Wylie, pianist, bandleader, songwriter and record producer, in Detroit, Michigan (d. 2008)
- Died: George Fawcett, 78, American actor

== June 7, 1939 (Wednesday) ==
- The German–Latvian Non-Aggression Pact and German–Estonian Non-Aggression Pact were signed in Berlin.
- King George VI and Queen Elizabeth crossed the Canada–US border into the United States at Niagara Falls. U.S. Secretary of State Cordell Hull was there to formally welcome them into the country.

== June 8, 1939 (Thursday) ==
- The King and Queen of the United Kingdom dined with President Roosevelt at the White House.
- A German police sergeant was found slain in Kladno near Prague. Reichsprotektor of Bohemia and Moravia Konstantin von Neurath punished the city by closing all public buildings, imposing a curfew, removing the mayor and disarming the police because they "failed to fulfill their duty."
- Members of the Hitler Youth were forbidden from eating ice cream cones while in uniform. They were informed by their superiors that it was "not in conformity with the dignity" of the uniform.

== June 9, 1939 (Friday) ==
- A wave of bombs exploded in twenty-seven mailboxes and two post offices around England. A total of seven people were injured.
- The International Olympic Committee awarded the 1944 Winter Olympics to Cortina d'Ampezzo, Italy and the 1944 Summer Olympics to London, United Kingdom.
- A U.S. court ruled in favor of Houghton Mifflin's claim to the sole rights to publish Hitler's Mein Kampf in the United States, barring Stackpole Sons from publishing any more copies of their competing unauthorized edition of the book.
- Born: Ileana Cotrubaș, opera soprano, in Galați, Romania; Dick Vitale, basketball sportscaster, in Passaic, New Jersey
- Died: Owen Moore, 52, Irish actor (heart attack)

== June 10, 1939 (Saturday) ==
- An estimated 2 million people crowded the New York waterfront to watch the King and Queen of the United Kingdom arrive on the destroyer USS Warrington. The royal couple rode up Manhattan's West Side through Queens and visited the New York World's Fair.
- Issue #40 of DC's Adventure Comics (cover date July 1939) was published, featuring the first appearance of the Sandman character.

== June 11, 1939 (Sunday) ==
- Pope Pius XII received 3,200 veterans of the Spanish Civil War at the Vatican and personally thanked them for defending "the faith and civilization of Spain" under Francisco Franco.
- Franklin and Eleanor Roosevelt hosted the King and Queen of the United Kingdom at Hyde Park and served a dinner of hot dogs and beer, much to the media's delight. The Queen did not know how to eat a hot dog.
- Born: Christina Crawford, writer and actress, in Los Angeles; Baroness Rachael Heyhoe Flint, cricketer, in Wolverhampton, United Kingdom (d. 2017); Jackie Stewart, racing driver, in Milton, West Dunbartonshire, Scotland

== June 12, 1939 (Monday) ==
- The first Baseball Hall of Fame induction ceremony was held in Cooperstown, New York. 25 inductees had already been named since the induction process began in 1936. All 11 living inductees participated in the inaugural ceremony.
- The Jean-Antoine Watteau painting L'Indifferent was stolen from the Louvre in broad daylight. It would be recovered two months later.
- Byron Nelson won the U.S. Open.

== June 13, 1939 (Tuesday) ==
- The Inter-governmental Committee of Refugees announced an international agreement to keep the 907 Jewish refugees aboard the St. Louis from having to return to Germany. Belgium agreed to grant temporary refuge to 250, the Netherlands 194, France about 200 and Britain the remainder.
- Born: Tom Cheek, sportscaster, in Pensacola, Florida (d. 2005)
- Died: Karl Gall, 35, Austrian motorcycle racer (from racing crash injuries sustained on June 2)

== June 14, 1939 (Wednesday) ==
- Tientsin incident: Japan began a blockade of the British concession at Tientsin because British officials refused to hand over the four killers of an important Chinese collaborator.
- Born: Steny Hoyer, politician, in New York City

== June 15, 1939 (Thursday) ==
- The French submarine Phenix sank in Cam Ranh Bay off French Indochina with the loss of all 71 crew.
- The King and Queen of the United Kingdom departed North America from Halifax, Nova Scotia as a crowd of 150,000 cheered a farewell.
- Issue #1 of Mystery Men Comics hit newsstands, featuring the first appearance of a new superhero, Blue Beetle.
- Born: Brian Jacques, writer, in Liverpool, United Kingdom (d. 2011)

== June 16, 1939 (Friday) ==
- The British Foreign Office issued a statement warning that if the Japanese maintained their blockade in China, "an extremely serious situation will arise" and the British government would "have to consider what immediate and active steps they can take for the protection of British interests in China."
- Born: Billy "Crash" Craddock, country and rockabilly singer, in Greensboro, North Carolina
- Died: Chick Webb, 34?, American jazz and swing drummer and bandleader (spinal tuberculosis)

== June 17, 1939 (Saturday) ==
- An alleged plot to assassinate Carol II of Romania and Prime Minister Armand Călinescu was revealed as seven former members of the banned Iron Guard organization were arrested. The reported plan was to throw grenades at the royal box during Sunday's horse race at the Bucharest race track.
- Joseph Goebbels told a pro-Nazi crowd in the Free City of Danzig that reunification with Germany was "inevitable", and any power that tried to prevent it was making "a mistake if it bases its calculations on the assumption that Germany is weak. It is strong, and unlike some other states whose destinies are in the hands of weak men, this new Germany is led by Adolf Hitler."
- Died: Eugen Weidmann, 31, German-born serial killer and last person to be publicly executed in France (guillotined)

== June 18, 1939 (Sunday) ==
- A tornado in Minnesota killed at least 10 people.
- Born: Lou Brock, baseball player, in El Dorado, Arkansas (d. 2020); Jack Herer, cannabis activist, in Buffalo, New York (d. 2010)

== June 19, 1939 (Monday) ==
- A market in Haifa was bombed, killing 18 Arabs and wounding 24. A Jew in a nearby street was stabbed to death minutes later.
- Japanese military authorities erected a electric wire barricade around the British and French concessions in Tientsin.
- The Mayo Clinic Hospital in Rochester, Minnesota diagnosed Lou Gehrig with amyotrophic lateral sclerosis.
- Died: Grace Abbott, 60, American social worker

== June 20, 1939 (Tuesday) ==
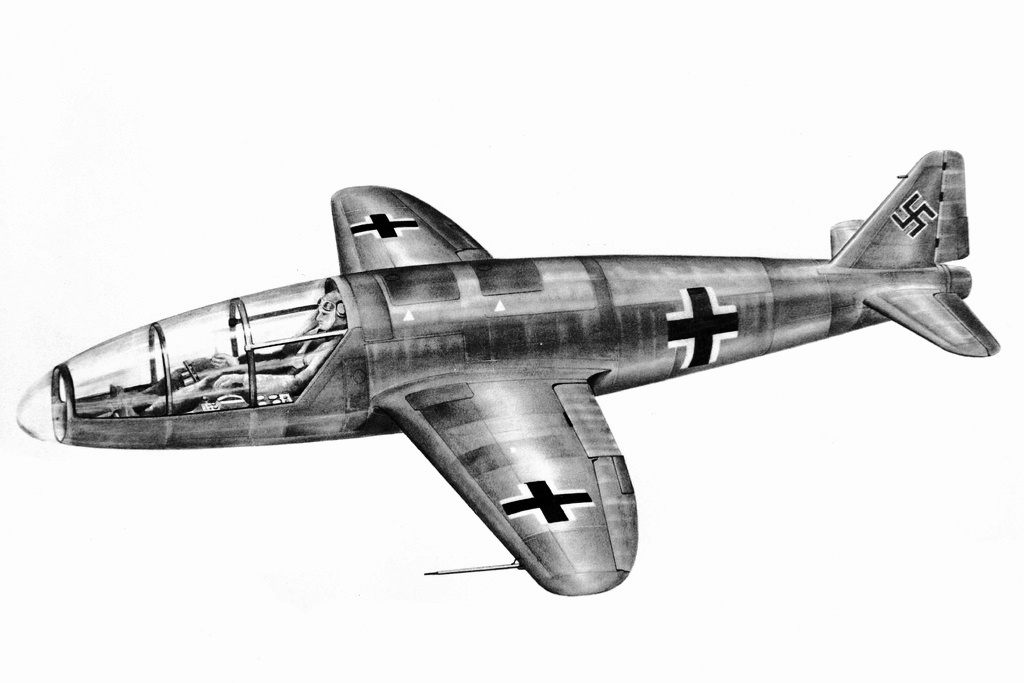
Artist's impression of the Heinkel He 176

- The German Luftwaffe's Heinkel He 176 rocket plane, the first aircraft powered solely by a liquid-propellant rocket, made its first flight.
- Former U.S. federal judge Martin Thomas Manton was sentenced to two years in prison and fined $10,000 for accepting bribes.
- The SS Heimwehr Danzig was formed.

== June 21, 1939 (Wednesday) ==
- The Swatow Operation began. The Japanese captured the city of Shantou.
- Reichsprotektor of Bohemia and Moravia Konstantin von Neurath decreed that Jews could no longer make new acquisitions of real estate, stocks or bonds, and could not enter new business contracts. Jews were also forbidden from buying, selling or pawning valuables such as gold or silver and were ordered to report such valuables to the bank.
- An early morning fire broke out in a tenement building on Doyer Street in Chinatown, Manhattan, killing 8.

== June 22, 1939 (Thursday) ==
- A discussion in the House of Commons on the Tientsin situation was shut down by the Speaker for becoming too heated. The end came when Geoffrey Mander asked Prime Minister Neville Chamberlain, "How many British subjects have to be insulted, stripped and killed before the British government will do anything effective?"
- The King and Queen of the United Kingdom returned from their successful trip to North America.
- The National Information Standards Organization was formed in the United States.
- Born: David Blackburn, artist, in Huddersfield, United Kingdom (d. 2016); Ada Yonath, crystallographer and Nobel laureate, in Jerusalem, Mandatory Palestine

== June 23, 1939 (Friday) ==
- France and Turkey signed a mutual assistance pact. France renounced all claims to the Republic of Hatay while Turkey promised aid to France in the event of aggression.
- Bronko Nagurski defeated Lou Thesz in Houston, Texas to win the National Wrestling Association World Heavyweight Championship.
- The drama film Daughters Courageous starring the Lane Sisters was released.

== June 24, 1939 (Saturday) ==
- Four bombs exploded in London's theater district, causing at least twenty injuries and causing panic among Saturday night crowds. The explosions were caused by bombs similar to those attributed to the Irish Republican Army in other recent bombings throughout Britain.
- Siam becomes officially known as Thailand (for the first time)
- Born: Michael Gothard, actor, in London, United Kingdom (d. 1992)

== June 25, 1939 (Sunday) ==
- Sevilla FC defeated Racing Club de Ferrol 6–2 in the 1939 Copa del Generalísimo Final.
- Hermann Lang of Germany won the Belgian Grand Prix.
- Died: Richard Seaman, alias Dick Seaman, 26, British motor racing driver, of injuries received in an accident during the Belgian Grand Prix.

== June 26, 1939 (Monday) ==
- France abolished public executions.
- Richard W. Leche resigned as Governor of Louisiana amid a corruption scandal. He was replaced by Lieutenant Governor Earl Long.
- Died: Ford Madox Ford, 65, English writer and editor

== June 27, 1939 (Tuesday) ==
- The Swatow Operation ended in Japanese victory.
- French Prime Minister Édouard Daladier stunned parliament by ordering its adjournment for summer holidays several days earlier than expected. Daladier's decree explained, "We are in the hands of events and it is possible that the parliamentary vacation will be more brief than those who are protesting against closing the session think ... On our frontiers there are 3 million men without counting semi-military units. And in the interior they are working frantically in factories while we receive announcements of concentration of troops more important than ever before along our frontiers in the guise of maneuvers."
- A night game was played at Cleveland Stadium for the first time. The Indians blanked the Detroit Tigers 5–0 on a one-hitter by Bob Feller.
- Born: Neil Hawke, cricketer and Australian rules footballer, in Cheltenham, South Australia (d. 2000); Brereton Jones, horse breeder and 58th governor of Kentucky, in Gallipolis, Ohio (d. 2023)

== June 28, 1939 (Wednesday) ==
- Winston Churchill made a speech before the City Carlton Club entitled "Three Months of Tension" in which he said, "If my words could reach Herr Hitler, as indeed they may, I would say to him – pause; consider well before you take a plunge into the terrible unknown. Consider whether your life's work – which might now be famous in the eyes of history – in raising Germany from prostration and defeat to a point where all the world is waiting anxiously upon her actions, consider whether all this may not be irretrievably cast away."
- Joe Louis retained the world heavyweight boxing title by knocking out Tony Galento in the fourth round at Yankee Stadium.
- The Women's Auxiliary Air Force was created in the United Kingdom.
- The New York Yankees set a new major league record for home runs by a team in a single game when they hit eight against the Philadelphia Athletics during a 23–2 victory in the first game of a doubleheader. This record was broken in 1987, but a different record set by the Yankees that day still stands: most home runs in a doubleheader. They hit five more in the second game during a 10–0 victory for a total of 13 in one day.
- Died: Harry Leon Wilson, 72, American novelist; Bobby Vernon, 42, American actor (heart attack)

== June 29, 1939 (Thursday) ==
- Poland served notice to Germany that it was willing to fight for Danzig when millions nationwide swore an oath to "never allow themselves to be cut off from the Baltic Sea."
- The Fascist Grand Council approved more Italian Racial Laws, prohibiting Jews from practicing their professions among Christians, owning radios, using popular vacation resorts or placing notices in newspapers, among other restrictions.
- Following a referendum, the legislature of the Republic of Hatay voted to disestablish the Republic and join Turkey. The French encouraged the annexation, hoping it would act as an incentive to Turkey to reject an alliance with Nazi Germany.
- The Irish agrarian political party Clann na Talmhan was founded.

== June 30, 1939 (Friday) ==
- The Federal Theatre Project ended when its funding was canceled.
- The radio anthology series Philip Morris Playhouse premiered in CBS.
- Born: José Emilio Pacheco, poet, in Mexico City, Mexico (d. 2014)
