= Birger Dahlerus =

Swedish businessman, amateur diplomat

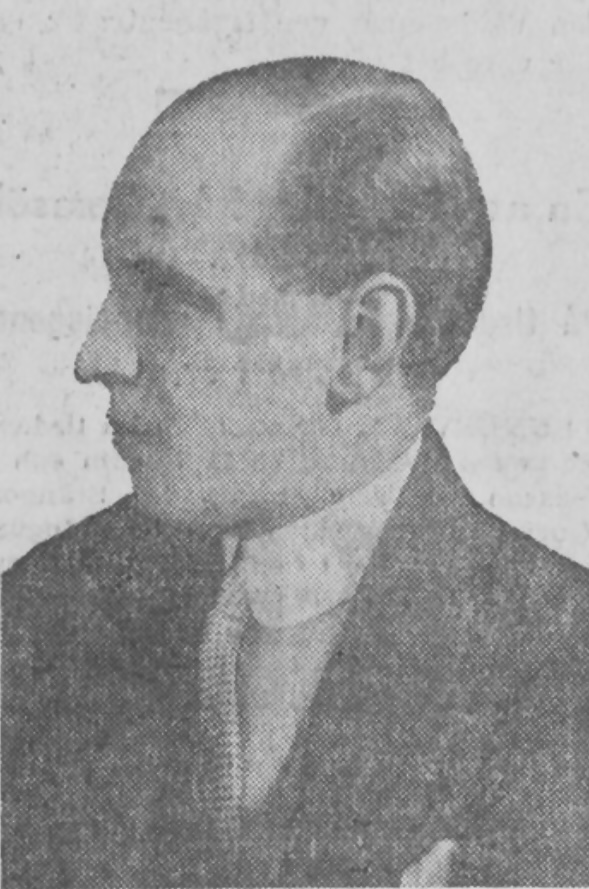
Birger Dahlerus

Johan Birger Essen Dahlerus (6 February 1891, Stockholm – 8 March 1957, Stockholm) was a Swedish businessman, amateur diplomat and friend of Hermann Göring. He attempted through diplomatic channels to prevent the Second World War.

His futile diplomatic efforts during the days preceding the German invasion of Poland in 1939 are sometimes called the Dahlerus Mission.

== Early life ==
Birger Dahlerus was born in Stockholm in 1891. He had an excellent network of contacts of authoritative Englishmen and various leaders of the Third Reich, such as his early acquaintance with Hermann Göring.

Only after the failure of his efforts would the British government bother to do a basic background check on him (on 23 October). The results were startling, as it emerged that his wife was a German national who owned considerable farm property in Germany. Furthermore, the British government was not aware that Göring had assisted Dahlerus in obtaining a marriage permit in 1934 or that Dahlerus had acted as guardian to Göring's stepson from his first marriage. Had those facts been known in advance, it is very likely that Dahlerus's services would not have been accepted by Britain, as his purported neutrality was greatly compromised.

== Dahlerus Mission ==
It had been known to the senior military personnel of the Third Reich, at least since the Military Conference of 6 August 1939 at Obersalzberg, that war between Nazi Germany and the Western powers was imminent. On 7 August 1939, Dahlerus arranged a meeting at his own house, near the Danish border in Schleswig-Holstein, between Göring and seven British businessmen:

- A. Holden
- Charles Spencer
- Stanley Rawson (John Brown & Company)
- Brian Mountain
- Sir Robert Renwick
- Charles Maclaren
- T. Mensforth

The businessmen attempted to persuade Göring that the British government would stand by its treaty obligations to Poland, which obliged it to support the Polish government in any conflict in which it became embroiled. Dahlerus believed that they had succeeded.

At the Nuremberg trials, the British prosecutor, Sir David Maxwell-Fyfe, was able to persuade the Swede that he had been badly misled by the German leaders, and that the discussion had no effect on the policy and actions of the Third Reich.

On 25 August 1939, the British and the Polish governments converted the unilateral declaration of support offered by the British government into a mutual assistance pact. On the same day, Benito Mussolini wrote to Hitler to indicate that he would declare war on the Western Powers immediately. Dahlerus then was acting as an intermediary between Göring and British Foreign Secretary Lord Halifax. Göring had summoned Dahlerus from Stockholm on the previous day, put him on an aircraft and dispatched him to inform the British government that Germany wanted an understanding with Britain. Halifax informed him that diplomatic channels were open and that his input was unnecessary.

Following a telephone conversation between him and Göring, Dahlerus had a further conversation with Halifax on 26 August. He persuaded Halifax to write a letter, couched in nonspecific terms, indicating the desire of the British government for peace and requesting a few days' leeway in which to achieve it.

On 27 August, Dahlerus flew to London and met Neville Chamberlain, Lord Halifax, Sir Horace Wilson and Sir Alexander Cadogan. He presented an offer, which included a proposal that Britain would agree to Germany offering to guarantee the borders of Poland, taking Danzig and allowing a referendum in the Polish corridor. The very modest proposal was nevertheless felt to be unacceptable, and the Poles would fight rather than agree to it. It was agreed that Dahlerus would return to Berlin and report with Hitler's reply. Dahlerus had become so significant, according to his own testimony, that he felt able to advise the British government that it should keep Ambassador Nevile Henderson in London until the next day so that he could better react to Hitler's response.

On 29 August, at a meeting with the German Foreign Minister, Joachim von Ribbentrop, Henderson had been presented with a document containing 16 points that Germany demanded agreement by Poland. Henderson said that they were spoken too quickly for him to understand and that he was denied a written copy. On the following day, Dahlerus was given a copy of the 16 points by Göring and took them to Henderson, who dispatched him to Polish Ambassador Józef Lipski, who had never heard of Dahlerus. As one of the 16 points was that a Polish negotiator with full plenipotentiary powers should appear in Berlin before 1 September, the Polish government deemed the proposals unreasonable.

On 31 August, Lipski was received by Ribbentrop. On being asked if he had come as a fully-empowered delegate, he stated that he was not and then was dismissed. An intercepted copy of the telegram to Lipski, defining his powers, was given by Göring to Dahlerus to take to Henderson.

Dahlerus's next diplomatic effort before the onset of war occurred on the afternoon of the last day of peace. He proposed that Göring should again meet with Henderson, which he did at 5 pm. Sir George Ogilvie-Forbes, counsellor and chargé d'affaires at the British embassy, was also present. His statement, presented at Nuremberg, described the atmosphere as negative and suggested Göring's confidence in the ability of Germany to crush Poland quickly.

The Third Reich commenced land operations against Poland on 1 September 1939 at 04:45. At 08:00, Dahlerus met Göring, who claimed that the Poles had attacked Germany at Dirschau. Dahlerus, in his Nuremberg testimony, said, "I informed somebody that according to the information I had received the Poles had attacked, and they naturally wondered what was happening to me when I gave that information". Dahlerus also stated that "the Poles are sabotaging everything" and that he had "evidence they never meant to attempt to negotiate".

Dahlerus telephoned London again at 12:30 and this time was put through to Cadogan. Cadogan, a committed anti-appeaser, was only the Under-Secretary of State, and Dahlerus insisted that his comments to be submitted to the British Cabinet, which they duly were. The answer given to the Swede was that negotiation was impossible without the immediate withdrawal of German forces from Polish territory.

The British and the French governments issued ultimata to the German government on 3 September 1939. Dahlerus telephoned the British Foreign Office ten minutes before the British ultimatum expired with a proposal for Göring to fly immediately to London for negotiations. Perhaps unsurprisingly, that was rejected.

== Wartime activity ==
In early September, he kept in touch with Göring by telephone. On 10 September, Göring passed to him letters written by two RAF prisoners-of-war captured during a leaflet-bombing raid as proof of his goodwill; they were duly passed on by Dahlerus to Sir Edmund Monson, the British minister in Stockholm. Dahlerus said to Monson that Göring was "absolutely trustworthy" and claimed to Monson that Hitler's popularity was declining.

He then flew to Berlin, where on 26 September, he met with Göring and Hitler. Göring and Hitler were completely intransigent and willing to make peace only on their own terms: keeping all their conquests and retaining a free hand in Eastern Europe.

Although that should have been the end of negotiations, Dahlerus then tried to represent or rather to misrepresent to the British the Nazi position as showing signs of flexibility. He flew to London and was very cordially and hopefully received there. He had a talk with Cadogan on 28 September and on 29 September met with Chamberlain and Halifax themselves.

Hitler's peace proposals, as presented by Dahlerus in a mellow form at the meeting, amounted to a rump Poland in complete vassalage to Germany, annexation to Germany of the old Reich territories in Poland, restoration of the lost German colonies or compensation for them, a promise of no further aggression subject to "suitable guarantees" and the settlement of the Jewish question by using Poland "as a sink in which to empty the Jews".

Still, the proposals were a nonstarter, and the British began losing interest in Dahlerus and his flurry of activity, as they indicated that no promises from Hitler would be trusted anymore. Dahlerus floated the idea of holding a German plebiscite to ratify the projected peace terms.

However, Dahlerus no longer found a receptive audience in Britain for his projects, and the reception of his subsequent efforts on 4–5 October, 11 October and 18–19 October was considerably cooler. He was denied a visa to come again to London to present "new" proposals from Göring or Hitler and then faded into obscurity.

== Assessment ==
Dahlerus made a number of further attempts to mediate between Britain and Germany, which he neglected to mention in his book. Essentially, Dahlerus tried to convince the British government that Göring was ready to do a deal with Britain behind Hitler's back. The implication was that Hitler would then acquiesce in the fait accompli or somehow be removed to make room for a new government, inspired by Göring.

That was all false, as Göring all along had kept Hitler thoroughly informed of his doings. In practice, Dahlerus was helping the Nazi leadership to dupe and to confuse the British to weaken their resolve and perhaps to compromise them into publicly accepting the possibility of peace without Germany relinquishing its gains or dismantling the regime.

Dahlerus, whether he was duped as well, mesmerized by taking what seemed to him a crucial role in world diplomacy or was all along an accomplice to the Nazi attempt at deception, played his role well and managed to confuse the British government for a long time.

The details of his later moves, after the British declaration of war, were not publicly available during the Nuremberg trial and were hidden until the British archives were declassified.

== Sources ==
- Birger Dahlerus, Sista försöket : London - Berlin sommaren 1939, Stockholm : Norstedt, 1945 (English Translation: The Last Attempt, Introduction by Norman Birkett, Translation from Swedish by Alexandra Dick, 1946).
- Nicholas Bethell, The War Hitler Won: September 1939, Allen Lane The Penguin Press, 1972.
