= Rudolf Formis =

German anti-Nazi broadcaster

- Self portrait of Rudolf Formis
- Born: 25 December 1894; Stuttgart, German Empire
- Died: 23 January 1935 (aged 40); Slapy, Czechoslovakia
- Cause of death: Assassination by gunshot
- Occupation: Radio engineer
- Political party: Black Front

Karl Erich Rudolf Formis (25 December 1894 – 23 January 1935) was a German engineer and radio engineer at the Süddeutsche Rundfunk AG (SÜRAG) subsidiary of Reichs-Rundfunk-Gesellschaft. Formis was a pioneer of the German amateur radio movement. During the period of Nazi rule in Germany, he transmitted anti-Nazi radio broadcasts from Czechoslovakia for the Black Front organisation, using a self-built shortwave radio. Formis was murdered by the Sicherheitsdienst on the orders of Reinhard Heydrich.

== Life ==
Formis came from a middle-class Stuttgart family. His grandfather, Christian Friedrich von Leins, was a well-known architect, who designed the Villa Berg in Stuttgart, among others. In World War I, Formis belonged to the German Asia Corps and fought alongside Ottoman Empire troops in Arabia. After the war, Formis demonstrated his advanced capabilities in the field of radiotelegraphy when he built a short-wave transmitter capable of communicating with the United States. In the spring of 1923, this enabled Formis to gain employment at SÜRAG, where he built the first transmission systems for the company. He worked at the company for over 10 years and reached the position of technical director for South German Radio

In 1925 Formis introduced the German amateur radio designation DE (DE = German receiving station). Formis himself had the mark DE 0100. His call sign as a broadcast amateur was K-Y4. In 1928, at Castle Solitude near Stuttgart, he built a remote receiving station for SÜRAG, which supplied the transmission of reports from overseas. From January 1932 Formis was head of the SÜRAG technical department.

After the Nazis came to power, Formis became a member of the Sturmabteilung on 7 March 1933, and as an SA member took part in the occupation of the Stuttgart Radio Station. He gave a speech in support of the National Socialists without previously being publicly known as a national socialist, and turned against the previous director Bofinger. Formis later came into conflict with the Nazis, as his grandmother, the wife of Christian Friedrich von Leins, was Jewish. One account also cited that he became disillusioned during the course of the Nazi revolution and that, as a dramatic protest, he cut the landline of the radio broadcasting one of Hitler's public addresses so that the transmission of his three-hour speech to millions of Germans listening at home went dead. For this action, he was arrested and beaten by the Gestapo. After his Jewish ancestry was revealed, he was also dispatched to a concentration camp.

== Black Front ==
Having been arrested in Germany, Formis fled and tried to move to Turkey, but was intercepted in Bulgaria due to having incorrect documentation and sent to Prague. In Prague, Formis joined the Black Front, an opposition group run by Otto Strasser that had split from the National Socialists. Formis directed the distribution of Strasser's newspaper, Die Deutsche Revolution (The German Revolution) and built an underground broadcasting station in the former Hotel Záhoří near Slapy nad Vltavou in November 1934. The shortwave transmitter had been built by Formis and was brought from his Stuttgart workshop to Czechoslovakia by himself or his friends. After test broadcasts starting in September, regular group broadcasts began on 2 December 1934.

Formis's transmitter was the first German clandestine radio transmitter to be detected by the Nazis. He used similar operating frequencies to the Königs Wusterhausen radio transmitter and operated in a manner that made receivers believe the signal was transmitted from Berlin. During this period, Formis acted as technician, speaker and author. He drew his information from press compilations of the Prague office of the Black Front and from self-scanned broadcasts. The program included appeals against the Nazi regime, replies to Nazi propaganda and calls for resistance and sabotage. In addition, management reports from Strasser were broadcast, in which he also tried to ridicule the Nazi Party. Strasser used his knowledge of leading Nazis from the time of his party membership before 1930, a circumstance that should have put Hitler in a special position. The broadcasting operation was particularly annoying for the Nazi Party because radio broadcasts were at the time the most modern form of propaganda, and were thus considered very important.

Formis had tuned the antenna of the transmitter so most of the power went up into the sky (skywave propagation). In this way the transmitter ground wave would be more difficult to locate within a radius of about 20 kilometres. Nevertheless, the Abhördienst (the German defence) could locate the operation with the power of just a 100-watt transmitter. In the event, the Prague exile group of the Black Front was infiltrated by Gestapo agents, and the crucial information about the location of the transmitter and the operator came from Strasser's employee, Franke.

The German government called on the Czechoslovak government to take action against the station. In a letter signed by Secretary of State Bernhard Wilhelm von Bülow of 12 December 1934, the station was classified as a "hate centre" (Hetzzentrale), which should be banned by the authorities. Recordings of the broadcasts were played to Stuttgart radio staff, who recognised Formis' speech as "snarling honourific Swabian".

In January 1935, SD commander Reinhard Heydrich ordered SS squad leader Alfred Naujocks to destroy the underground transmitter. Naujocks, travelling under the name Hans Müller and camouflaged as a skier, drove to Czechoslovakia with Edith Kersbach, a gym teacher from Berlin, where they succeeded in gaining Formis' confidence and making a waxprint of the key to the transmitter room. Naujocks briefly returned to Germany, had a duplicate made, and drove again to Slapy nad Vltavou with Werner Göttsch. Their plan was to gain access to the transmission room unnoticed, destroy the transmitter with acid, sedate Formis and kidnap him. On 23 January 1935, contrary to the plan, Formis stayed in the broadcasting room and fired at Naujocks when he entered. Formis was shot dead in the subsequent firefight, killed by two pistol shots. Hitting a waiter prevented the SD agents from finding the transmitter, which was hidden in a mattress. The chaos created by the incident aggravated Heydrich, who feared incurring Himmler's wrath for the complications of what he considered to be a bungled operation. The public killing exposed the SD's activities in Czechoslovakia, using Sudetenland as the base of operations, including the surveillance and pursuit of German emigres in the country as well as the support for the "Aufbruch" circle, a group critical of Konrad Henlein's Sudeten German Heimatfront.

Formis is buried in Slapy.

== Aftermath ==
After the bungled shooting, the Black Front was broadcasting again within hours. Agents Naujocks and Göttsch both managed to escape back to Germany after the murder. Diplomatic protests by the Czechoslovak government to the German government went unanswered. Naujocks was interned after the war, and later interrogated by a British-Czech commission, who decided that should be sent to Denmark for trial, as he had been involved in a counter-terrorism operation there, known as "Gegenterror". In January 1949, Naujocks was sentenced to fifteen years in prison but only served five on appeal. The German authorities investigated Naujocks during the 1960s. There were five preliminary investigations but these never led to indictments. Göttsch was indicted in 1967 in Hamburg, but according to the indictment it was not possible to determine who fired the lethal shots.

Numerous reports on the murder of Rudolf Formis appeared in exiled German newspapers. The German-language Parisian Tageblatt newspaper cited the Prague-based newspaper Venkov, stating it was "crimes of this kind which unmask the true soul of Hitler's Germany". Writer Fritz Erpenbeck attacked the Sicherheitsdienst for the murder in his 1939 novel Emigranten and portrayed Formis under the name "Dormler". On 18 July 1941, the BBC broadcast a radio play about the murder. Formis is considered a hero within the community of amateur Czech radio operators.

The radio station used by Rudolf Formis was preserved for posterity. In 2012 and 2013 it was on loan to the National Technical Museum in Prague.

== Bibliography ==
- Bosch, Michael; Niess, Wolfgang (December 1984). Der Widerstand im deutschen Südwesten, 1933-1945 Schriften zur politischen Landeskunde Baden-Württembergs (in German). Stuttgart: Kohlhammer Verlag. pp. 311−317. ISBN 9783170083653.
- Morgenstern, Andreas. "Der Stuttgarter Rundfunkpionier Rudolf Formis und der Sender der Schwarzen Front in der Tschechoslowakei 1934/35". In Becher, Peter; Knechtel, Anna (eds.). Hörfunk und Hörfunkpolitik in der Tschechoslowakei und im Protektorat Böhmen und Mähren. Berlin: Frank & Timme. pp. 43–58. ISBN 978-3-7329-0277-4.
- Morgenstern, Andreas (2017). "Formis, Karl Erich Rudolf". In Rückert, Maria Magdalena (ed.). Württembergische Biographien unter Einbeziehung hohenzollerischer Persönlichkeiten [Wuerttemberg biographies involving Hohenzollern personalities, Volume III]. Stuttgart: Kohlhammer Verlag. pp. 67–69.
- Morgenstern, Andreas (2016). "Hier ruft die Schwarze Front!" Der Weg des Rundfunkpioniers Rudolf Formis" (PDF). Rundfunk und Geschicht (3–4): 15–23.
- Morgenstern, Andreas (2012). "Rundfunksendungen widersprechen NS-Nachrichten". Anständig gehandelt. Widerstand und Volksgemeinschaft 1933–1945. Stuttgart: Haus der Geschichte Baden-Württemberg. pp. 57–60. ISBN 978-3-933726-42-1.
- Schneider, Reinhard (1996). "Das tragische Schicksal von Rolf Formis". Funkgeschichte (105). Publikation der Gesellschaft der Freunde der Geschichte des Funkwesens e.V: 15–18.
