= Vltava (steamboat) =

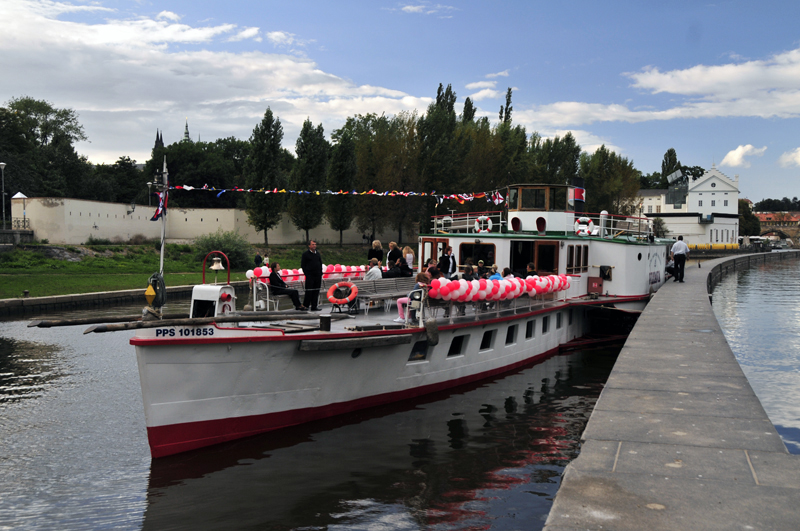
- Vltava – 145-year anniversary of Prague Steamboat Company

History
- Owner: Prague Steamboat Company
- Builder: PRAGA shipyard
- Cost: 2.7 million crowns
- Launched: 27 August 1940

General characteristics
- Length: 53 m (174 ft)
- Beam: 5.1 m (17 ft)
- Installed power: 112.5 hp (83.9 kW) steam engine
- Speed: 16.5 kilometres per hour (10.3 mph; 8.9 kn)
- Capacity: 250 passengers

Vltava has been in operation since 1940 when the Prague Steamboat Company decided to renovate its fleet. After World War II there were 17 steamboats altogether but as time went by they decayed and most of them were set aside. Only two of them are still in use – Vltava and Vyšehrad.

Vltava belongs to a group of rather small steamboats. It had to be shorter and narrower in order to be able to sail easily and safely through the very busy locks on the route from Prague to Štěchovice for which it had originally been built. Because there were very low bridges on the river it did not even have a sightseeing deck. It was made in the PRAGA shipyard in Prague under the supervision of the chief constructor Mr Benbenek. After some delay it was finally floated out on 27 August 1940. It was worth 2.7 million Czech crowns.

During World War II it had to be renamed along with many other boats. Its name was Moldau I (Moldau is a German word for the Vltava). The steamboat kept running on its route to Štěchovice until 1990 when it was put aside after an accident. In 1991 it was partially repaired and started operating as a restaurant boat. The last reconstruction was carried out in 2007 when the steamboat was completely reconstructed to resemble the one from 1940 as closely as possible.

== Technical details ==
The steamboat's length is 53 meters and it is 5.1 metres wide. It has a 112,5 kW (150 k) steam engine. The Vltava can hold 250 passengers, 100 of them can be seated. It reaches the speed of 16.5 km/h. It has its own restaurant, bar and a partially covered deck.

== Modern usage ==
Originally Vltava was used for connecting Prague and Štěchovice, later its route was extended to Slapy. In 1991 it became a restaurant boat and began use as a sightseeing boat for Prague river cruises as well as cruises to Mělník or Slapy. Now it mainly serves as a sightseeing steamboat in Prague.

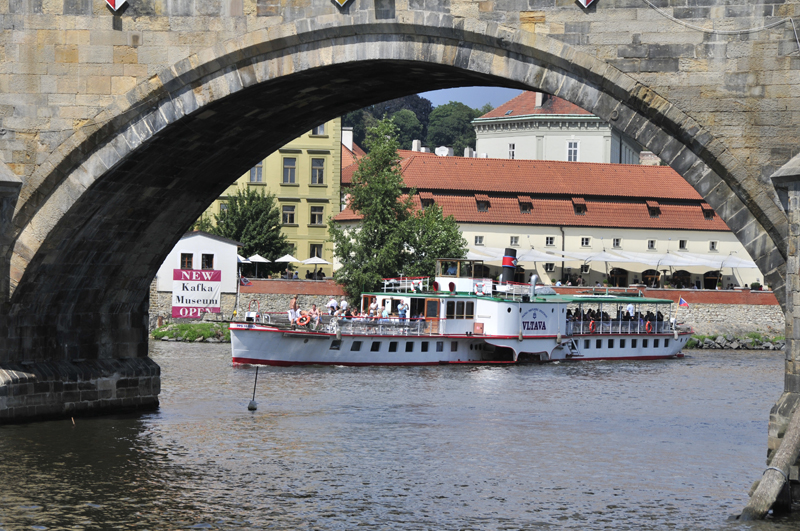
Vltava by Charles Bridge

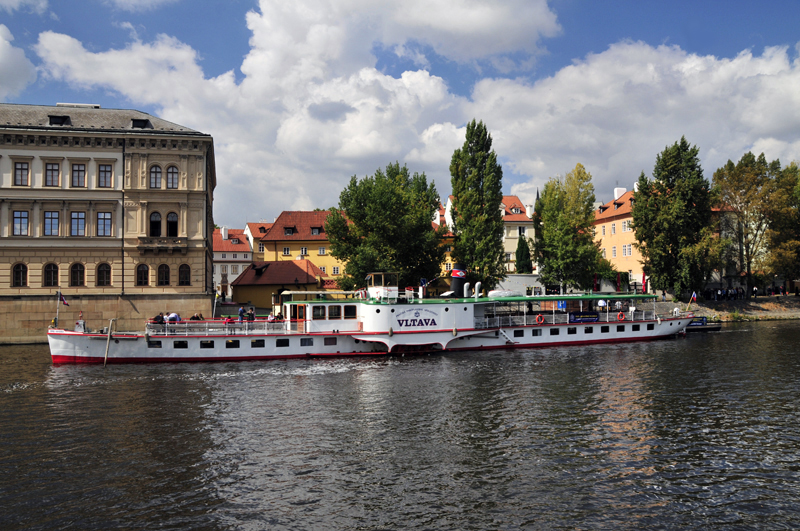
Vltava at Kampa Island

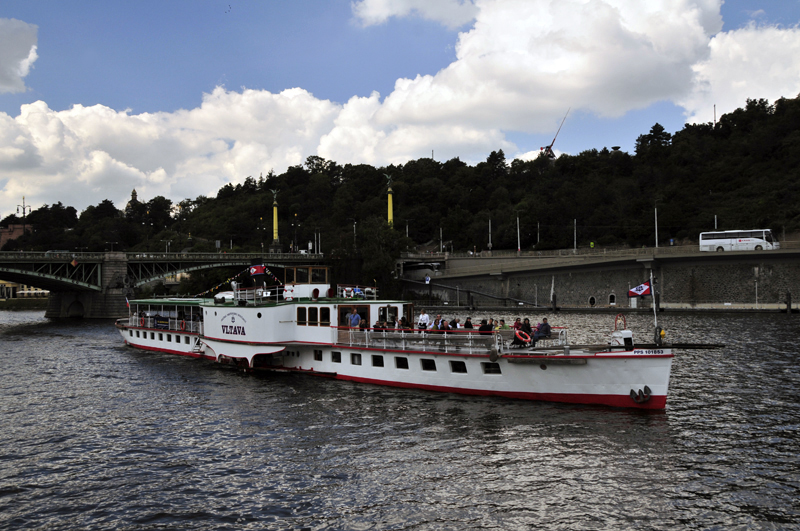
Vltava
