= Szobiszowice =

- District of Gliwice
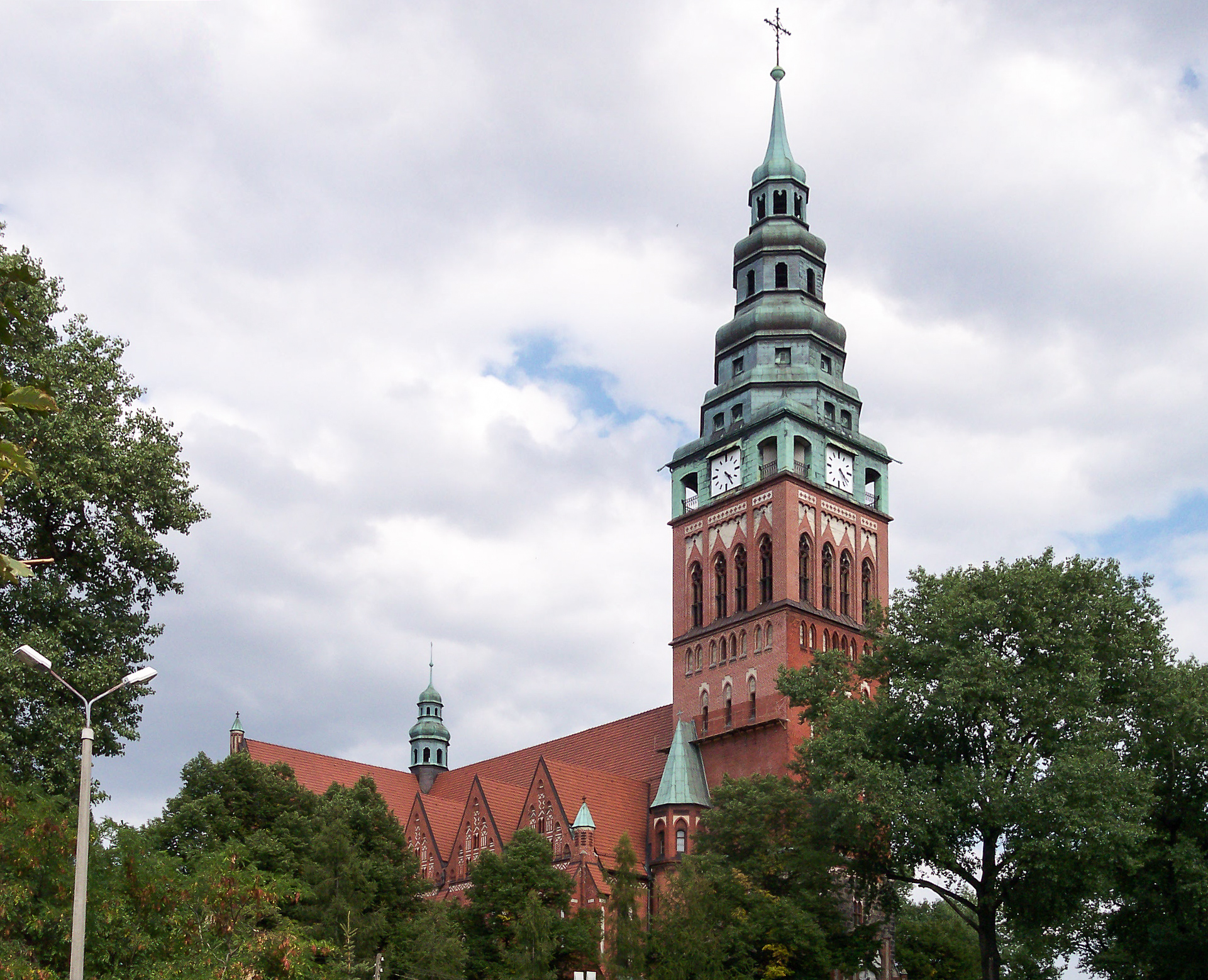
- New Church of St. Bartholomew in Szobiszowice

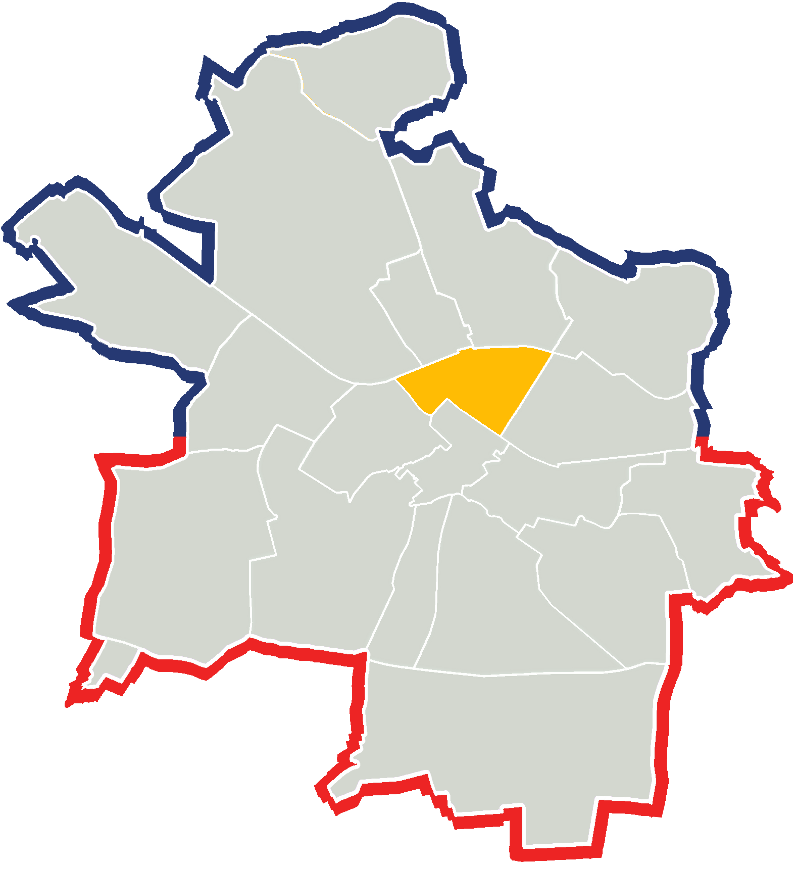
- Location of Szobiszowice within Gliwice
- Coordinates: 50°19′N 18°42′E
- Country: Poland
- Voivodeship: Silesia
- City: Gliwice
- Time zone: UTC+1 (CET)
  - Summer (DST): UTC+2 (CET)
- Vehicle registration: SG
- Primary airport: Katowice Airport

Szobiszowice is a neighborhood of the Polish city of Gliwice in Upper Silesia, located in the central part of the city.

== History ==
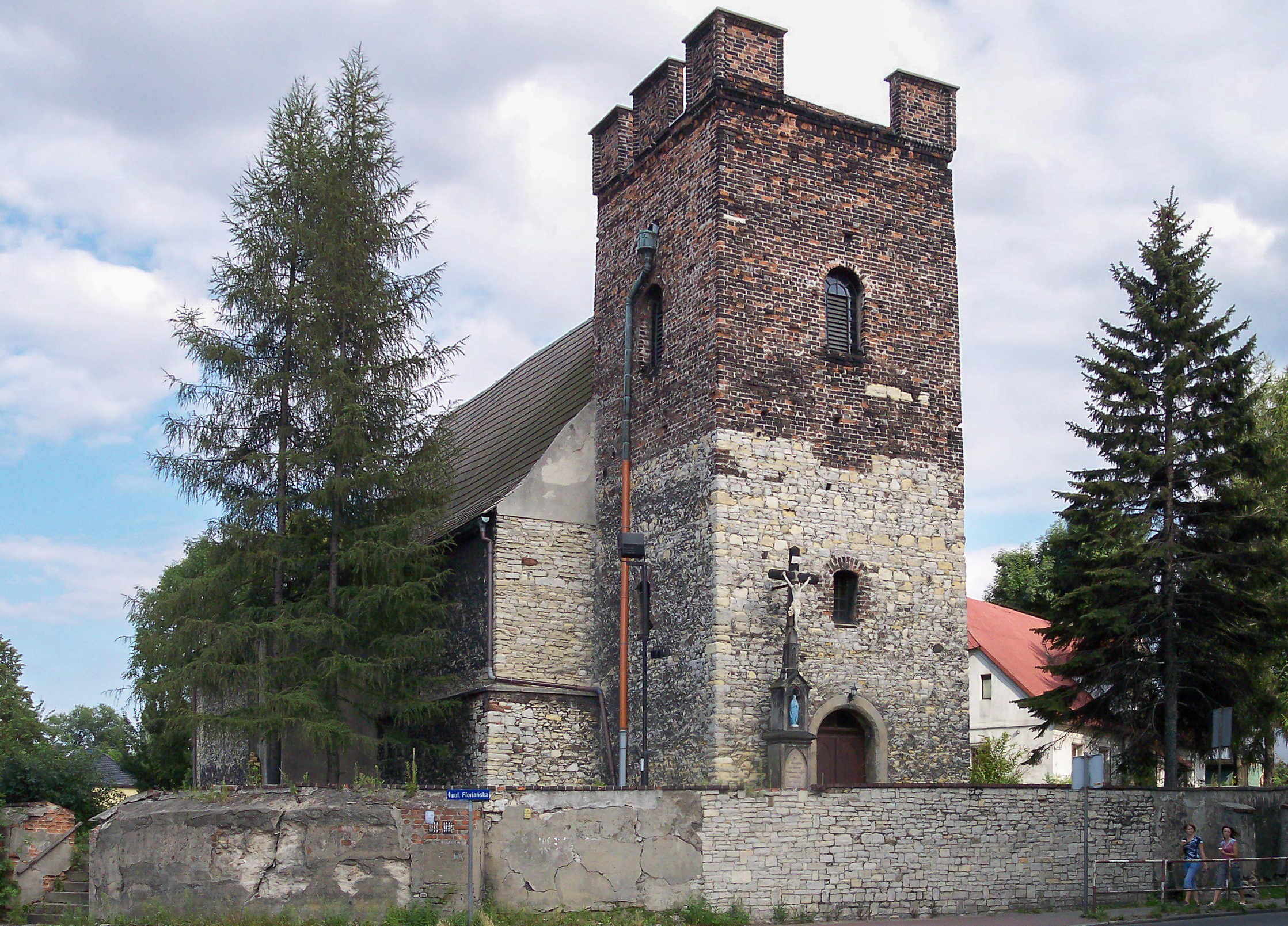
Medieval fortified Old Saint Bartholomew church

The village was first mentioned in 1276 through the divestiture of its owner Graf Peter von Slaventaw, who sold the village to the new lord of Szobiszowice, Hermann. In the early 14th-century Liber fundationis episcopatus Vratislaviensis it was mentioned under the Latinized name Novo Sobyssowitz. The name Szobiszowice is of Polish origin, and it probably comes from the name of its founder Sobiech. The old Church of St. Bartholomew was built in this suburb of Gliwice in the 13th century and was a place of activity for the Knights Templar. Alike Gliwice, Szobiszowice was part of various duchies of fragmented Piast-ruled Poland. In 1683 Polish troops led by King John III Sobieski stopped in the settlement before the Battle of Vienna. The population in this area grew rapidly in the 18th and 19th centuries due to this area's industrialization.

The area was annexed by Prussia in the 18th-century, and became part of Germany in 1871. The communities of Szobiszowice (then officially Petersdorf) and Trynek were incorporated in the municipal area of Gliwice on April 1, 1897. Before this incorporation, Petersdorf was an area in the Landkreis Tost-Gleiwitz. As a neighborhood of Gleiwitz the area experienced further expansion. During World War II, the Germans established and operated a Polenlager forced labour camp for Poles in the district.

In 1977, future Pope John Paul II delivered a sermon in the church of St. Bartholomew. In February 2008 the eastern section of Szobiszowice became a new neighborhood known as Zatorze.

== Notable landmarks ==
Szobiszowice contains the following landmarks:

- Old Saint Bartholomew church from the 13th century, one of the oldest structures of Gliwice
- The New Church of St. Bartholomew (the restored church, Polish: Kościół św. Bartłomieja),
- The wooden Radio mast the supports the former Gliwice Radio Tower,
- The felstone in Łabędy Forest

Formerly in Szobiszowice, but moved to Zatorze due to the boundary shift.:

- Christ the King Church (Polish: Kościół Chrystusa Króla, designed by Karl Mayr),
- Linden Cemetery (Cmentarz Lipowy) with the children's cemetery sculpted by Paul Ondrusch,
- Funeral Hall (Jewish Cemetery) and new Jewish cemetery (Nowy Cmentarz Żydowski)

Other monuments have disappeared or became unidentifiable, such as the former castle and the Swedish column.
