= Franciszek Honiok =

Polish civilian often cited as first victim of World War II

- Born: 1896
- Died: 31 August 1939 (aged 42-43); Gleiwitz, Upper Silesia, Nazi Germany (today Gliwice, Poland)
- Cause of death: shot by SS team

Franciszek Honiok (1896 – 31 August 1939) was a Polish male civilian who is famous for having been the first known victim of World War II, on the evening of 31 August 1939.

He was one of several victims of the Gleiwitz incident, a multi-part false flag operation contrived by German Schutzstaffel (SS) Reichsführer Heinrich Himmler and his deputy, Obergruppenführer Reinhard Heydrich, as a pretext for carrying out German Führer Adolf Hitler's plan to invade Poland.

== Background ==
A self-described Silesian (German: Oberschlesier, Silesian: Ślōnzŏk), Franciszek Honiok was a 43-year-old unmarried Catholic farmer and agricultural equipment salesman. Born in 1896 in Upper Silesia (a border region spanning present-day Poland and the Czech Republic), he had fought on the Polish side during the 1921 Silesian Uprisings that followed World War I. After a brief spell living in Poland, he returned to Germany in 1925, where he was forced to fight deportation back to Poland—a case he successfully pursued all the way to the League of Nations in Geneva. Though his firebrand days may have been over by 1939, Honiok was still well known in his home village of Hohenlieben (modern-day Łubie), about 10 miles (16 km) north of Gleiwitz (modern‐day Gliwice) and at the time a part of Germany, as a staunch advocate of the Polish cause.

== Arrest ==
Honiok was arrested by the SS in the village of Ostwalde on 30 August 1939, having been selected as a person who could provide "proof" of Polish aggression against Germany. He appears to have been selected because of his reputation as a Polish nationalist, which derived from his involvement in a number of local revolts against German rule in Silesia two decades before. According to his surviving family in Poland, Honiok identified strongly with Silesia and Poland. Following his arrest, he underwent a brief incarceration at the police barracks in Beuthen.

== Heydrich connection ==
Much of what is known about Operation Himmler and the Gleiwitz incident comes from the testimony of Alfred Naujocks, the SS-Sturmbannfuhrer (Major) who was in charge of organizing the incident for Heydrich, during the 1945 Nuremberg trials. Naujocks testified that during a meeting in Berlin, Heydrich instructed him that a body, dressed in a Polish military uniform, was to be left on the steps of the Gleiwitz radio station in order to insinuate a Polish connection. The top-secret operation was given a codeword, Großmutter gestorben ("Grandmother died"), to be used by Heydrich to indicate to Naujocks via telephone that the operation was to commence.

== Death ==
Honiok was injected with drugs to sedate him before the raid. He was then dragged semi-unconscious into the radio station, where he was shot in the head during the evening of 31 August. Naujocks added that Honiok had been referred to as a piece of Konserve, or "canned meat", which could be prepared in advance and used to suggest Polish involvement in the attack.

Germany invaded Poland the next morning, on 1 September 1939, which proved the proximate cause and the opening action of World War II. Honiok is often cited as the first official casualty of the war. The location of his body is unknown and no memorial exists in his memory.
