= Alfred Naujocks =

Nazi functionary (1911–1966)

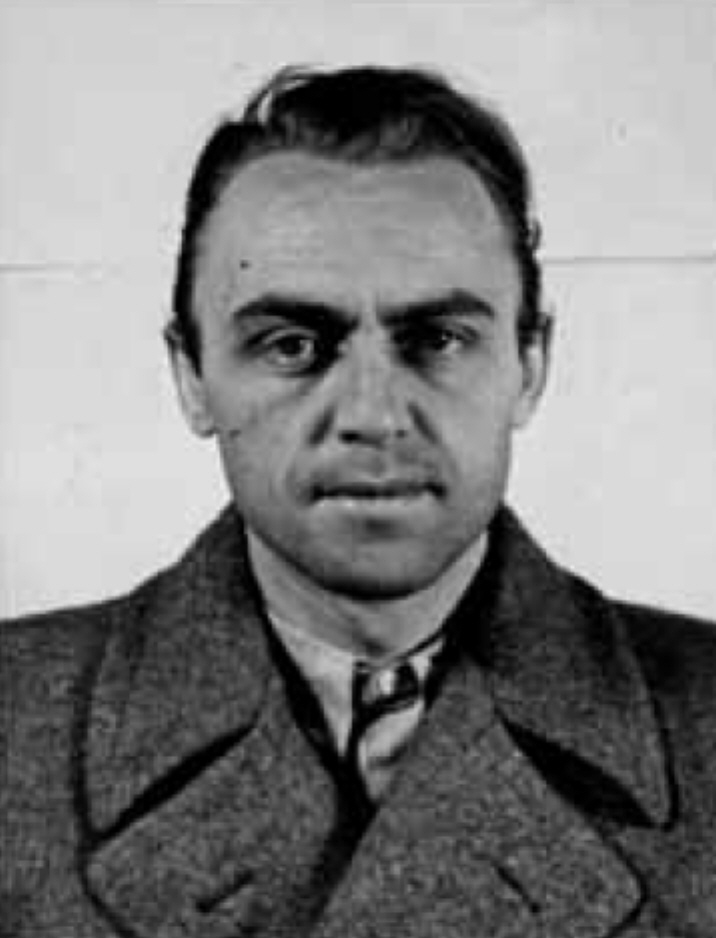
- Naujocks following his surrender to US forces in October 1944
- Born: Alfred Helmut Naujocks; 20 September 1911; Kiel, Prussia, German Empire
- Died: 4 April 1966 (aged 54); Hamburg, West Germany
- Education: University of Kiel
- Military career
- Allegiance: Nazi Germany
- Branch: Schutzstaffel, Waffen-SS: Sicherheitsdienst
- Service years: 1931–1945
- Rank: SS-Sturmbannführer
- Nicknames: Hans Müller; Alfred Bonsen; Rudolf Möbert
- Known for: Led the Gleiwitz incident
- Conflicts: World War II Venlo incident: Eastern Front; Western Front (POW)
- Awards: Iron Cross
- Other work: Businessman, alleged member of ODESSA

Alfred Helmut Naujocks (20 September 1911 – 4 April 1966), alias Hans Müller, Alfred Bonsen, and Rudolf Möbert, was a German Schutzstaffel (SS) functionary during the Third Reich. He took part in the staged Gleiwitz incident, a false flag operation intended to provide the justification for the attack on Poland by Nazi Germany, which ultimately culminated in starting World War II.

== Early life ==
Naujocks was born in Kiel and attended the University of Kiel, where he studied engineering. In 1931, after an incomplete apprenticeship as a precision mechanic, he joined the SS. A well known amateur boxer, he was frequently in brawls with the communists. He then signed on as a low-ranking driver for the Sicherheitsdienst SD-Regional Command East, Berlin in 1934, but was soon entrusted with special assignments such as murder. He led an undercover attack on an anti-Nazi radio station in the village of Slapy in Czechoslovakia on 23 January 1935. Black Front activist Rudolf Formis was killed in the incident; Naujocks confessed to the murder in 1944 while in US custody. By autumn 1937, Naujocks had been promoted to Hauptsturmführer ('captain') and by the following year, had been promoted again to Sturmbannführer ('major').

== World War II ==
On 10 August 1939, Reinhard Heydrich informed Naujocks of his mission to lead a small group of German operatives to seize the Gleiwitz radio station. Three weeks later, on the night of 31 August, Naujocks led the attack on the German radio station at Gleiwitz, one of twenty-one similar concentrated attacks which the German government quickly attributed to the Poles. Once inside the radio station, a short anti-German message in Polish was broadcast (the precise content of the message is now uncertain). Shots were fired in the studio and a corpse left on the floor near the microphone.

This attack formed Hitler's justification to the Reichstag regarding the necessary "pacification" of Poland, thereby igniting the Second World War in Europe.

More recently, author and researcher Jak Mallmann Showell's investigation has suggested that Naujocks' claims as to his actions at the Gleiwitz radio station may have been a fabrication to curry special handling by the Allies after the war. Mallmann Showell discerned that Naujocks is the sole source for details of his personal actions on the night of 31 August 1939. He also avers that the Poles may have accessed the site to obtain Enigma machine secrets for the Allies. General Lahousen confirmed he provided Naujocks the Polish uniforms.

Later, on 9 November 1939, Naujocks (along with Walter Schellenberg) participated in the Venlo incident, which saw the capture in the Netherlands of two British SIS agents, Captain Sigismund Payne Best and Major Richard Henry Stevens. For this, he was personally awarded the Iron Cross by Hitler. Naujocks also assisted Schellenberg in the secret assignment of spying on Berlin brothel Salon Kitty's clientele.

In early 1940, Naujocks was put in charge of the counterfeiting unit of the SD charged with forging British bank notes under Operation Andreas. By late 1940, Naujocks had been removed from his position after he fell out of favour with Heydrich.

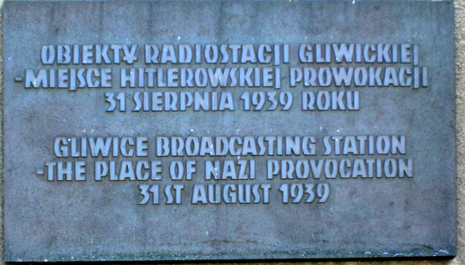
Plaque on site commemorating the Gleiwitz incident

In 1941, he was dismissed from the Sicherheitsdienst (SD) after disputing one of Heydrich's orders. He was demoted and had to serve in the Waffen-SS on the Eastern Front. In 1943, due to ill health, he was sent to the West, where he served as an economic administrator the following year for German troops in Belgium, while involving himself in the deaths of several Belgian underground and Danish resistance members.

After his promotion to SS-Obersturmführer ('first lieutenant') he participated in sabotage and terrorist actions against the Danish population from December 1943 until autumn 1944, as the leader of the "Peter Group", including the murder of Lutheran pastor Kaj Munk. Later leadership passed to SS-Hauptsturmführer Otto Alexander Friedrich Schwerdt (SS-Jagdverbände). Around November 1944 Naujocks turned himself over to US forces, who subsequently placed him in detention as a possible war criminal by the end of the war.

== Later life ==
At the Nuremberg trials, Naujocks declared the attack against the Gleiwitz radio tower was under orders from Heinrich Müller, the head of Gestapo and his superior, Reinhard Heydrich. After the war, he was not considered high-ranking enough to stand trial, but was called as a witness at the Nuremberg trials.

In 1947, Naujocks was extradited to Denmark to stand trial. There, he was found guilty of his role in the murders of Danish resistance fighters and sentenced to 15 years in prison. However, in 1950, Naujocks' sentence was reduced to four years, resulting in his immediate release.

Following the trials, Naujocks worked as a businessman in Hamburg, where he eventually sold his story to the media as The Man who Started the War. He was alleged to have been involved in running ODESSA, together with Otto Skorzeny, who handled contracts with the Spanish government, supplying passports and arranging for funds. Naujocks and his associates allegedly handled former Nazi war criminals going to Latin America, being responsible for their reception and protection there. Naujocks died of a heart attack in Hamburg on 4 April 1966, aged 54.

== Sources ==
- Ailsby, Christopher (2001). The Third Reich Day by Day. Zenith Imprint. ISBN 0-7603-1167-6.
- Benz, Wolfgang (2007). A Concise History of the Third Reich. Berkeley, CA: University of California Press. ISBN 978-0-52025-383-4.
- Bullock, Alan (1958). Hitler. A Study in Tyranny. New York: Bantam Books. "Naujocks' story is confirmed by General Lahousen, of the German Counter-Intelligence, whose job it was to provide the Polish uniforms."
- Mallmann Showell, Jakob Peter (2009). Enigma U-Boats: Breaking the Code (Revised ed.). Annapolis, MD: Naval Institute Press. ISBN 978-1-59114-238-6.
- Shirer, William Lawrence (1960), The Rise and Fall of the Third Reich: A History of Nazi Germany, New York City: Simon & Schuster, ASIN B0766DKDLR, LCCN 60006729, OCLC 1286630, OL 5794925M, Wikidata Q138029595
- Weale, Adrian (2010). The SS: A New History. London: Little, Brown. ISBN 978-1408703045.
