= Gleiwitz incident =

False flag attack by Nazi forces to invade Poland

- Part of Operation Himmler
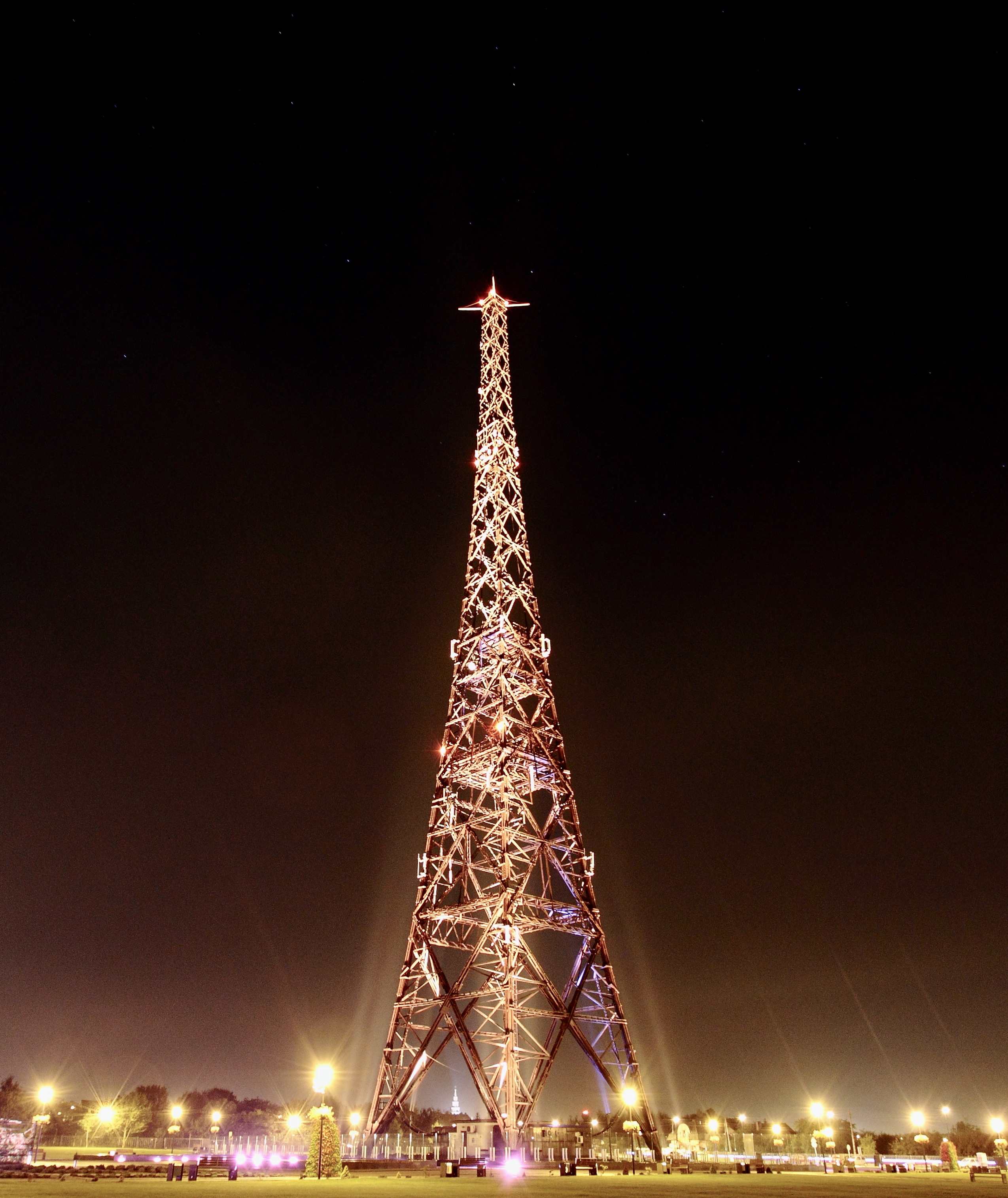
- Gliwice Radio Tower in 2012 Szobiszowice district
- Type: False flag attack
- Location: Gleiwitz, Upper Silesia, Nazi Germany (today Gliwice, Poland); 50°18′48″N 18°41′20″E
- Objective: Pretext for the invasion of Poland
- Date: 31 August 1939
- Executed by: SS
- Location of the Gleiwitz radio tower in Nazi Germany (1937 borders)

The Gleiwitz incident, or Gliwice incident (German: Überfall auf den Sender Gleiwitz; Polish: prowokacja gliwicka), was a false flag attack on the radio station Sender Gleiwitz in Gleiwitz (then Germany and now Gliwice, Poland) staged by Nazi Germany on the night of 31 August 1939. Along with some two dozen similar incidents, the attack was manufactured by Germany as a casus belli to justify the invasion of Poland. Despite the German government using the attack as a justification to go to war with Poland, the Gleiwitz assailants were not Polish but were German SS officers wearing Polish uniforms.

During his declaration of war, Hitler did not mention the Gleiwitz incident but grouped all provocations staged by the SS as an alleged "Polish assault" on Germany. The Gleiwitz incident is the best-known action of Operation Himmler, a series of special operations undertaken by the Schutzstaffel (SS) to serve German propaganda at the outbreak of war. The operation was intended to create the appearance of a Polish aggression against Germany to justify the invasion of Poland. On September 3, Britain and France declared war on Germany, and the European theatre of World War II began. Manufactured evidence for the Gleiwitz attack by the SS was provided by the undercover German SS officer Alfred Naujocks in 1945.

== Events at Gleiwitz ==
Much of what is known about the Gleiwitz incident comes from the affidavit of SS-Sturmbannführer Alfred Naujocks at the Nuremberg trials. In his testimony, he stated that he organised the incident under orders from Reinhard Heydrich and Heinrich Müller, chief of the Gestapo. On the night of 31 August, a small group of German operatives dressed in Polish uniforms and led by Naujocks seized the Gleiwitz station and broadcast a short anti-German message in Polish (sources vary on the content of the message). The operation was started after codeword "Grossmutter gestorben" (Grandmother died) was received. The operation was to make the attack and the broadcast look like the work of Polish anti-German saboteurs. The operation was planned and carried out from the Sławięcice Palace (Schloss Slawentzitz).

To make the attack seem more convincing, the Gestapo executed Franciszek Honiok, a 43-year-old unmarried Upper Silesian Catholic farmer, known for sympathising with the Poles. He had been arrested the previous day by the Gestapo and dressed to look like a saboteur, then rendered unconscious by an injection of drugs, then killed by gunshot wounds. Honiok was left dead at the scene so that he appeared to have been killed while attacking the station. His corpse was then presented to the police and press as proof of the attack. Several prisoners from the Dachau concentration camp were drugged, shot dead on the site and their faces disfigured to make identification impossible. The Germans referred to them by the code phrase "Konserve" (canned goods). Some sources incorrectly refer to the incident as Operation Canned Goods.

In an oral testimony at the Nuremberg Trials, Erwin von Lahousen stated that his division of the Abwehr was one of two that were given the task of providing Polish Army uniforms, equipment and identification cards; he was later told by Wilhelm Canaris that people from concentration camps had been disguised in these uniforms and ordered to attack the radio stations. Oskar Schindler played a role in supplying the Polish uniforms and weapons used in the operation as an agent for the Abwehr.

== Context ==
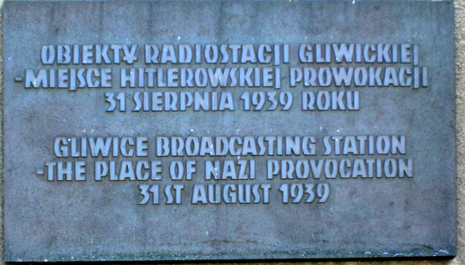
Plaque on site commemorating the incident

The Gleiwitz incident was a part of a larger operation carried out by Abwehr and SS forces. Other orchestrated incidents were conducted along the Polish–German border at the same time as the Gleiwitz attack, such as a house burning in the Polish Corridor and spurious propaganda. The project was called Operation Himmler and comprised incidents intended to give the appearance of Polish aggression against Germany. German newspapers and politicians, including Adolf Hitler, had made accusations against Polish authorities for months before the 1939 invasion of organising or tolerating violent ethnic cleansing of ethnic Germans living in Poland.

On 1 September, the day following the Gleiwitz attack, Germany launched Fall Weiss (Case White), the strategic plan for the invasion of Poland, which precipitated World War II in Europe. Hitler cited the border incidents in a speech in the Reichstag on the same day, with three of them called very serious, as justification for his invasion of Poland. Hitler had told his generals on 22 August, "I will provide a propagandistic casus belli. Its credibility doesn't matter. The victor will not be asked whether he told the truth".

== International reactions ==
American correspondents were summoned to the scene the next day but no neutral parties were allowed to investigate the incident in detail and the international public was skeptical of the German version of the incident.

== In popular culture ==
There have been several adaptations of the incident in cinema. Der Fall Gleiwitz (1961), directed by Gerhard Klein for DEFA studios (The Gleiwitz Case; English subtitles), is an East German film that reconstructs the events. Operacja Himmler (1979) is a Polish film that covers the events. Both Die Blechtrommel (1979), directed by Volker Schlöndorff, and Hitler's SS: Portrait in Evil (1985), directed by Jim Goddard, briefly include the incident. It was also mentioned in a video game; Codename: Panzers (2004), which stirred up some controversy in Poland where the game was briefly discussed in Polish media as anti-Polish falsification of history, before the issue was cleared up as a case of poor reporting.

== See also ==
- 1939 in Poland
- Jabłonków incident
- Mukden incident, a similar false flag operation that started the Japanese invasion of Manchuria
- Nazi war crimes in occupied Poland during World War II
- Operation Greif
- Shelling of Mainila, a similar false flag operation that started the Soviet invasion of Finland
- Tarnów train station bombing
