= Vyšehrad (steamboat) =

Ship

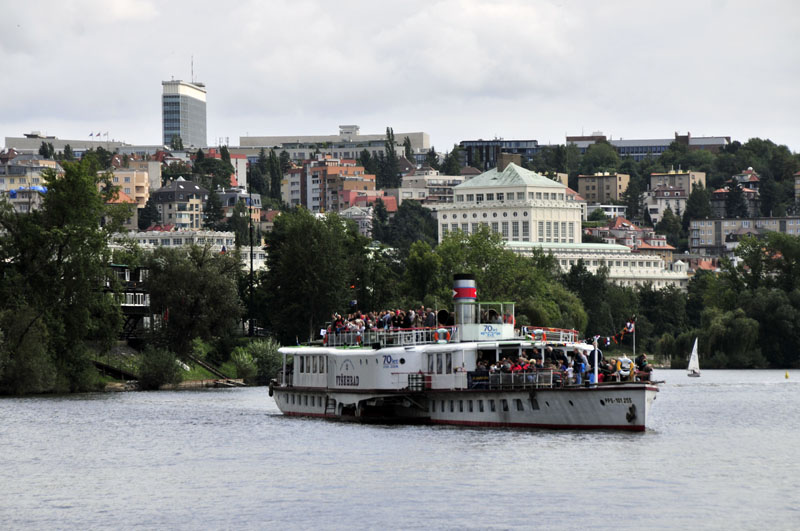
- Vyšehrad

History
- Name: Antonín Švehla; Karlstein (1942); T.G. Masaryk; Děvín (1952); Vyšehrad (1992)
- Owner: Prague Steamboat Company
- Builder: Ústí shipyard
- Cost: 2.5 million crowns
- Launched: 1938

General characteristics
- Length: 62 m (203 ft)
- Beam: 6.2 m (20 ft) (10.5 m (34 ft) at paddleboxes)
- Installed power: 165 kW (221 hp)
- Speed: 17 kilometres per hour (11 mph; 9.2 kn)
- Capacity: 885 passengers (as built); 300 passengers (present)

Vyšehrad is 1 of 2 steamboats on the Vltava River in Prague, Czech Republic, although she is no longer operating she belongs to the Prague Steamboat Company.

Vyšehrad was built in 1938 during the company's modernization in the 1930s when new boats were being bought and old ones modernized. Her original name was Antonín Švehla (a politician of the First Republic). Type-wise the Vyšehrad was similar to then a decade old steamers Dresden and Leipzig that belonged to SBDA Company (situated in Dresden).

It has been renamed at several points in history – Karlstein in 1942, T.G. Masaryk after World War II and Děvín in 1952. In 1992 it was completely renovated and renamed Vyšehrad. The most recent reconstruction took place in winter 2006–2007 in Laubegast shipyard in Dresden.

== Technical details ==
Vyšehrad is 62 m long and 6.2 m wide, 10.5 over the paddleboxes. It has a 165 kW (220 k) engine. Originally it could carry 885 passengers; nowadays it is 300, and 199 of them can be seated. Its maximum speed is approximately 17 km/h.

== Modern usage ==
At first Vyšehrad was used on a route between Prague and Vrané nad Vltavou (a little town about 10 km (6.2 mi) south of Prague). During World War II she served in Dresden as a field kitchen; after the war she was returned to Prague. In the 1970s Vyšehrad was used on the route between Prague and Štěchovice. Since the 1992 reconstruction she is used mainly as a restaurant boat and a boat for private cruises.

In 2025, Vyšehrad was transformed into "The Steamboat Museum" where she is permanently moored in between the Jirásek Bridge and Palacký Bridge and showcases 160 years of Prague history aboard.
