= Venkov =

== People ==
Venkov (Russian: Венков) is a Bulgarian masculine surname, its feminine counterpart is Venkova. Notable people with the surname include:

- Alexei Venkov (born 1946), Russian mathematician
- Mihail Venkov (born 1983), Bulgarian footballer
- Neven Venkov (born 1982), Bulgarian footballer
- Venelin Venkov (born 1982), Bulgarian Greco-Roman wrestler

== Other ==
- Venkov Czech newspaper (means 'Rural area') published between 1906 - 1945
