= Prague Steamboat Company =

Czech transport company

- Type: Joint-stock company
- Industry: Maritime transport
- Founded: 27 March 1992; 34 years ago
- Headquarters: Blanická 1008/28, Prague 2, 120 00, Czech Republic
- Area served: Czech Republic
- Services: Sightseeing cruises
- Parent: Evropská vodní doprava, s.r.o.
- Website: praguesteamboats.com

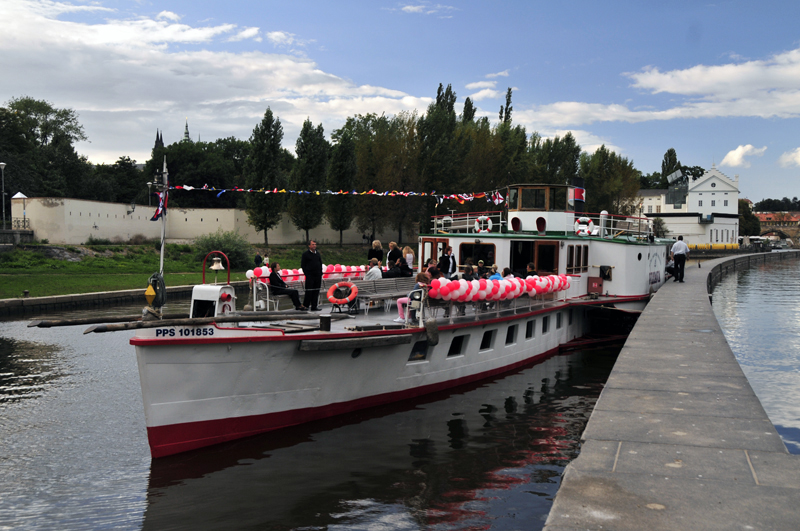
The Vltava - 145 years anniversary of Prague Steamboat Company

Prague Steamboat Company (Czech: Pražská paroplavební společnost, a.s.) provides regular sightseeing cruises in the lower Vltava river. It is one of the oldest Czech companies.

The person who played a very important part in establishing the company was František Dittrich (who later became a mayor of Prague). Prague Steamboat Company was established as a purely Czech company in 1865 when, after receiving a concession from Emperor Franz Josef I, it launched the steamboat Praha (Prague) on the route from Prague to Štěchovice (a small town about 20 km south of Prague).

The first years were not easy mainly due to the Austro-Prussian War in 1866, however, two decades later the company flourished in the economic boom that began in 1884. More steamboats were being built and in 1902 operations between Prague and Klecany (a village situated to the north of Prague) were launched.

After World War I the fleet comprised 8 large and 2 smaller paddle wheelers and 13 propeller steamboats. A new route from Prague through Mělník to Litoměřice and on the central Elbe River above Mělník was opened. The economic crisis combined with competition from bus line transport, the construction of the Vrané Dam and other factors nearly led PPS to bankruptcy in 1936. The company was taken over by Czechoslovak Joint Stock Elbe Steamboat Company while preserving the original name.

In 1961 the company was incorporated into Prague Public Transit Company. Problems with the maintenance of steam engines brought about the retirement of several paddle wheelers and in 1970 only four remained in operation.

After the Iron Curtain collapsed the company got its independence back and within a few years it was able to adapt itself to a market economy when it became part of the EVD group (Evropská vodní doprava, s.r.o. – European Water Transport).
