= Old Saint Bartholomew's Church, Gliwice =

Church in Poland

Coordinates: 50.311059°N 18.6696325°E

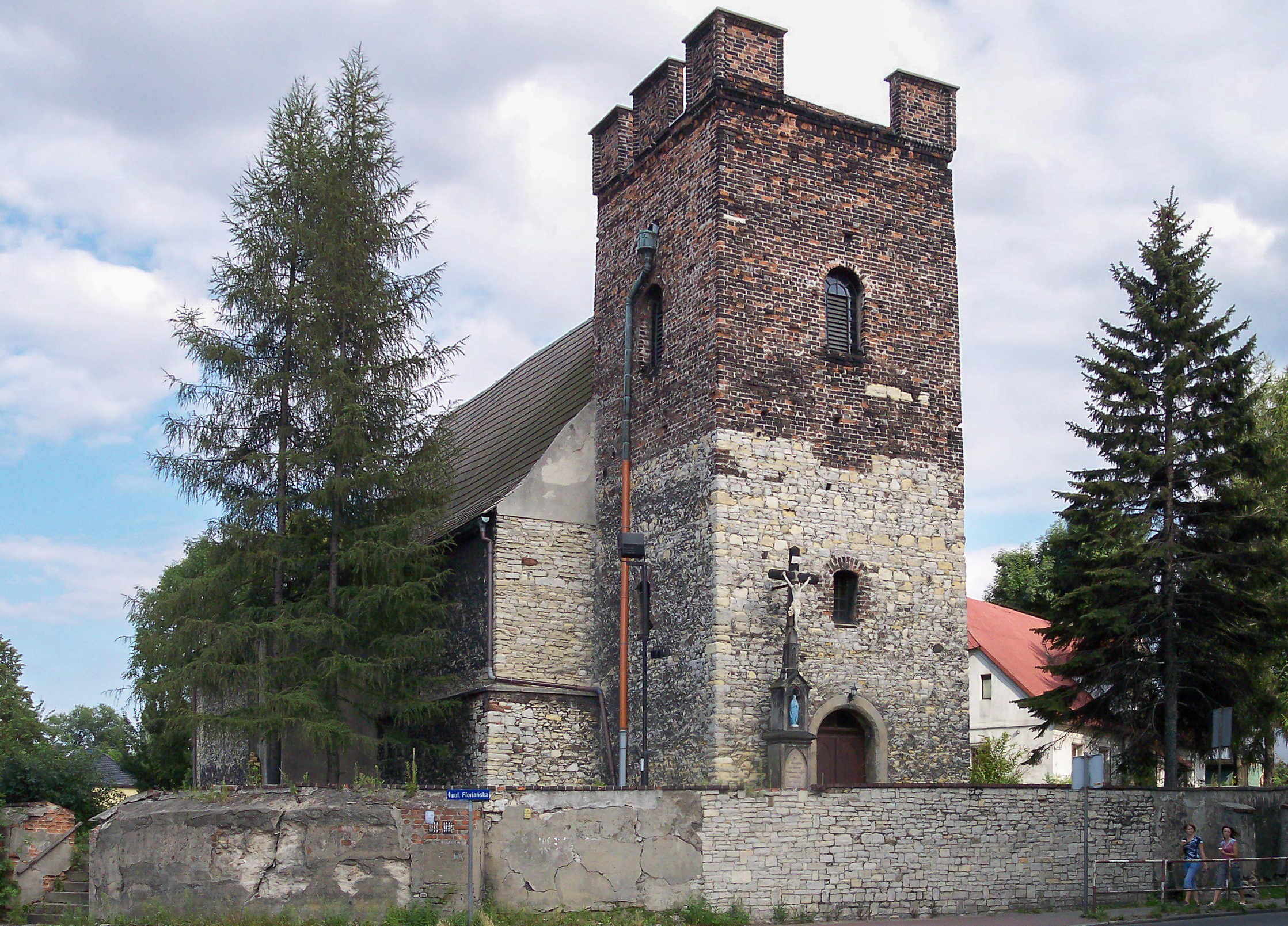
Old church of Saint Bartholomew

The Old church of Saint Bartholomew is a fortified church in Gliwice in the Silesian Voivodeship of Poland.

Originally, it was built in Romanesque style about 1232 and situated far outside the defensive walls of the city.

In the 15th century, it was enlarged in Gothic style. The western tower was enhanced using brick. Its character is rather military, than that of a steeple.

A renovation of the building is intended.
