= Gliwice Radio Tower =

Wooden lattice tower in Gliwice, Poland

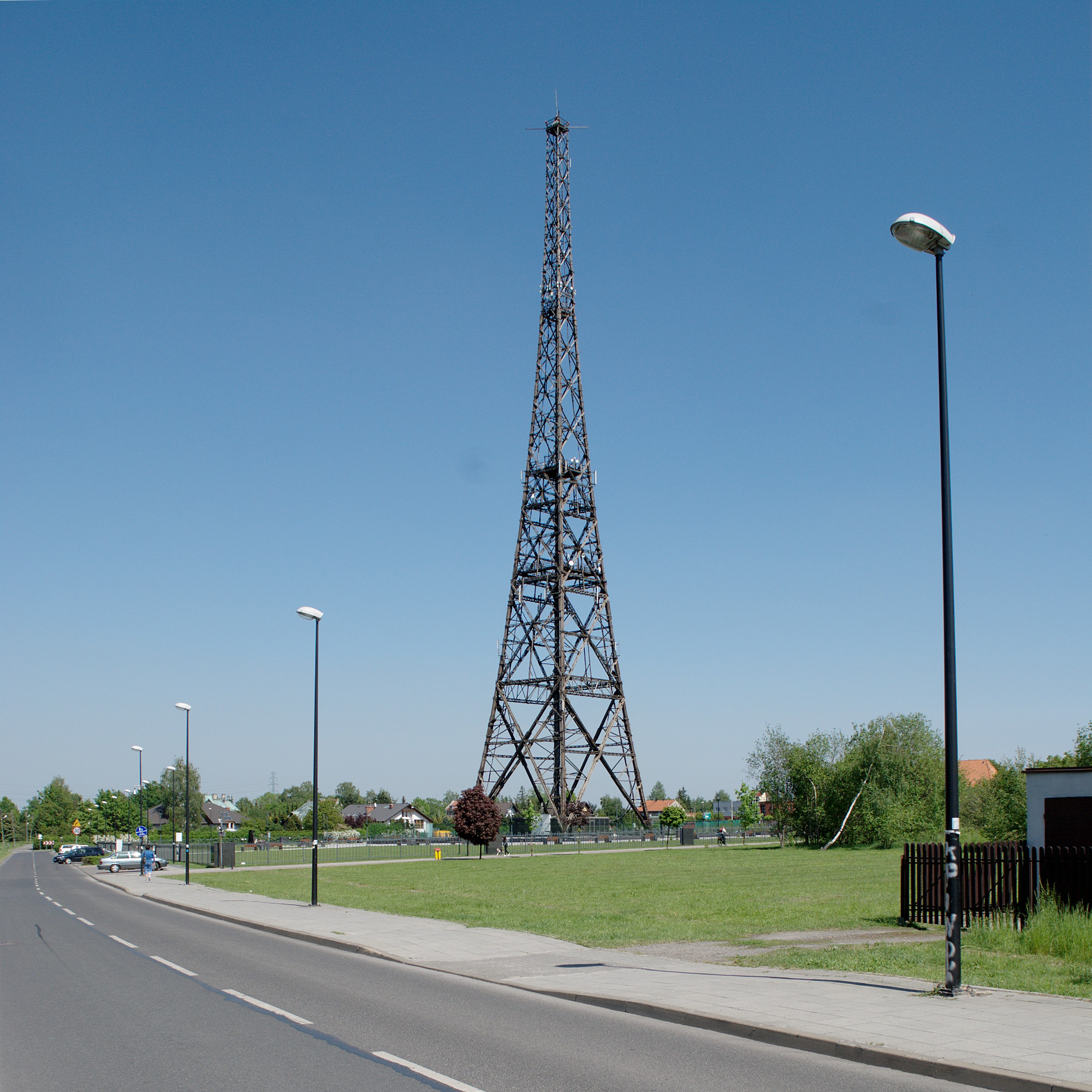
- Interactive map of the Gliwice Radio Tower area

General information
- Status: Completed
- Type: Wooden lattice tower
- Location: Gliwice, Poland
- Coordinates: 50°18′48″N 18°41′20″E
- Completed: 1935

Height
- Height: 112 m (367 ft)

Design and construction
- Main contractor: Deutsche Reichspost

Historic Monument of Poland
- Designated: 15 March 2017
- Reference no.: Dz. U. z 2017 r. poz. 654

The Gliwice Radio Tower is a transmission tower in the Szobiszowice district of Gliwice, Upper Silesia, Poland. Nazi Germany staged a false flag attack on the tower in 1939, which was used as a pretext for invading Poland, beginning World War II.

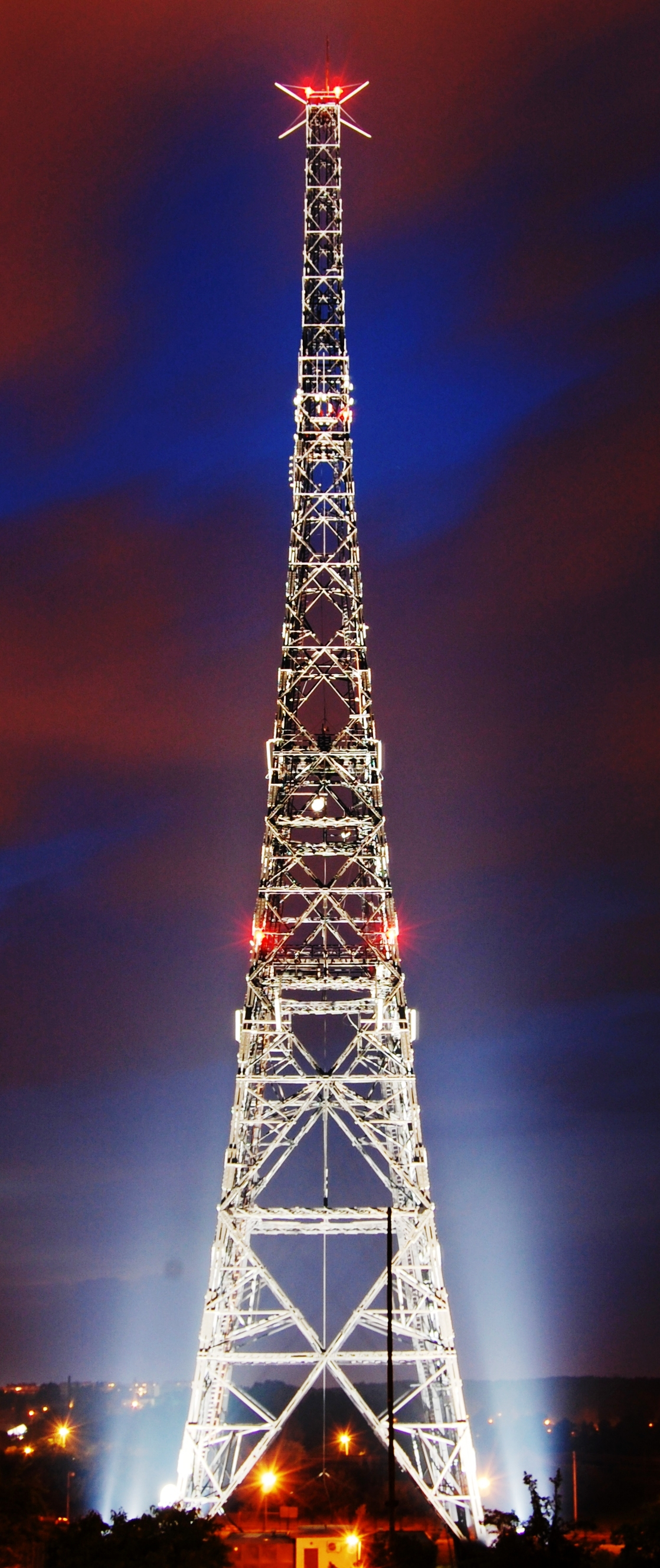
Gliwice Radio Tower

== Structure ==
The Gliwice Radio Tower is 112 m (367 ft) tall, with a wooden framework of impregnated siberian larch linked by brass connectors. It's the tallest wooden structure in the world. It was nicknamed "the Silesian Eiffel Tower" by the local population. The tower has four platforms, at 40.4 m (133 ft), 55.3 m (181 ft), 80 m (260 ft) and 109.7 m (360 ft) above ground. The top platform measures 2.13 m (7 ft 0 in) square. A ladder with 365 steps provides access to the top.

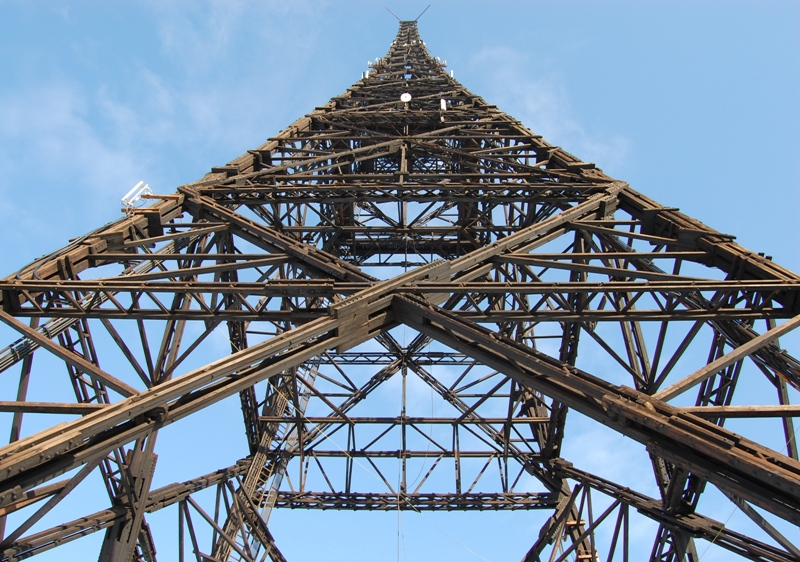
Timber structure

The tower was originally designed to carry aerials for medium wave broadcasting, but that transmitter is no longer in service because the final stage is missing. Today, the Gliwice Radio Tower carries multiple transceiver antennas for mobile phone services and a low-power FM transmitter broadcasting on 93.4 MHz.

== History ==
The tower was erected from 1 August 1934 as Sendeturm Gleiwitz (Gleiwitz Radio Tower), when the territory was part of Germany. It was operated by the Reichssender Breslau (former Schlesische Funkstunde broadcasting corporation) of the Reichs-Rundfunk-Gesellschaft radio network. The tower was modeled on the Mühlacker radio transmitter, it replaced a smaller transmitter in Gleiwitz situated nearby on Raudener Straße and went in service on 23 December 1935.

On 31 August 1939, the German SS staged a 'Polish' attack on Gleiwitz radio station, which next morning was used as justification (Seit 5 Uhr 45 wird jetzt zurückgeschossen! / We are now, since 5.45, returning fire!) for the invasion of Poland. The transmission facility was not demolished in World War II. From 4 October 1945 until the inauguration of the new transmitter in Ruda Śląska in 1955 the Gliwice transmitter was used for medium-wave transmissions by the Polish state broadcaster Polskie Radio. After 1955, it was used to jam medium-wave stations (such as Radio Free Europe) broadcasting Polish-language programmes from Western Europe.

== Transmitted programmes ==
=== Radio ===
Program	Frequency MHz	Power kW	Polarisation	Antenna Diagram around (ND) / directional (D)
Radio CCM	93.40	2	Vertical	ND

== Impact ==
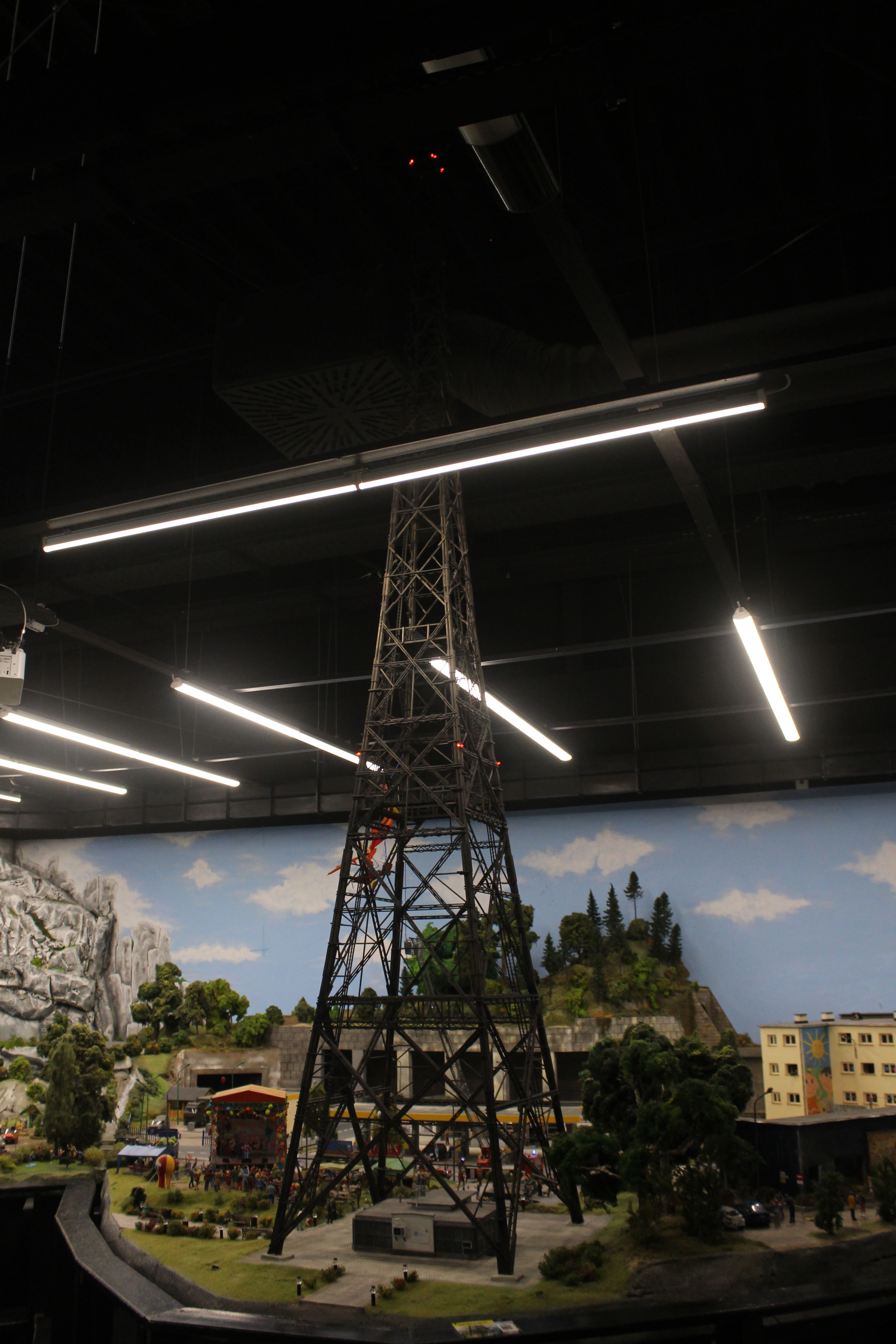
Model of Gliwice Radio Tower at Gliwice Kolejkowo model train park

The shape of the Pope Cross of Zabrze was inspired by Gliwice Radio Tower. A scale model of the tower exists at Gliwice Kolejkowo model train park.
