= Alexei Venkov =

Russian mathematician

Alexei Borisovich Venkov (Алексей Борисович Венков, born 1946) is a Russian mathematician, specializing in the spectral theory of automorphic forms.

Venkov graduated from Leningrad State University in 1969 and received there in 1973 his Russian candidate degree (Ph.D.) under Ludvig Faddeev. He then became an academic at the Steklov Institute in Saint Petersburg, where he received in 1980 his Russian doctorate (higher doctoral degree) with dissertation Spectral theory of automorphic functions (Russian). He was a visiting scholar at IHES, at the University of Göttingen, in Paris (University of Paris VI, École Normale Superieure, Institute Henri Poincaré), at the MSRI, at Stanford University, several times at the Max Planck Institute for Mathematics in Bonn, at the University of Lille, and at the Aarhus University. Since 2001 he has been a lecturer at Aarhus University.

Venkov's research deals with the spectral theory of automorphic forms and their applications in number theory and mathematical physics. He has proved partial results for the Roelcke-Selberg conjecture.

In 1983 he was an Invited Speaker at the ICM in Warsaw. In 2006 he received the Humboldt Research Award.

== Selected publications ==
=== Articles ===
- with V. L. Kalinin and Ludvig Faddeev: A nonarithmetic derivation of the Selberg trace formula, Journal of Soviet Mathematics, vol. 8, 1977, pp. 171–199
- Spectral theory of automorphic functions, the Selberg zeta-function, and some problems of analytic number theory and mathematical physics, Russian Mathematical Surveys, vol. 34, 1979, pp. 79–153
- Remainder term in the Weyl-Selberg asymptotic formula, Journal of Mathematical Sciences 17, no. 5, 1981, pp. 2083–2097 doi:10.1007/BF01567587
- with N. V. Proskurin: Automorphic forms and Kummer's problem, Russian Mathematical Surveys, vol. 37, 1982, pp. 165–190
- Selberg's trace formula for an automorphic Schroedinger Operator, Functional Analysis and Applications, vol. 25, 1991, pp. 102–111 doi:10.1007/BF01079589
- On a multidimensional variant of the Roelcke-Selberg conjecture, Saint Petersburg Mathematical Journal, vol. 4, 1993, pp. 527–538
- with A. M. Nikitin: The Selberg trace formula, Ramanujan graphs and some problems in mathematical physics, Saint Petersburg Mathematical Journal, vol. 5, 1994, pp. 419–484.
- Approximation of Maass forms by analytic modular forms, Saint Petersburg Mathematical Journal, vol. 6, 1995, pp. 1167–1177
- The Zagier formula with the Eisenstein-Maass series at odd integer points, and the generalized Selberg zeta function, Saint Petersburg Mathematical Journal, vol. 6, 1995, pp. 519–527.
- with E. Balslev: Selberg's eigenvalue conjecture and the Siegel zeros for Hecke L-series, in: Analysis on Homogeneous Spaces and Representation Theory of Lie Groups, Okayama-Kyoto 1997, Advanced Studies in Pure Mathematics 26, Mathematical Society of Japan 2000, pp. 19–32
- with Erik Balslev: Spectral theory of Laplacians for Hecke groups with primitive character, Acta Mathematica, vol. 186, 2001, pp. 155–217, doi:10.1007/BF02401839; Correction vol. 192, 2004, pp. 1–3 doi:10.1007/BF02441083
- with E. Balslev: On the relative distribution of eigenvalues of exceptional Hecke operators and automorphic Laplacians, Original publication: Algebra i Analiz, tom 17 (2005), nomer 1. Journal: St. Petersburg Math. J. 17 (2006), 1-37 doi:10.1090/S1061-0022-06-00891-0
- with A. Momeni: Mayer's transfer operator approach to Selberg's zeta function, Original publication: Algebra i Analiz, tom 24 (2012), nomer 4. Journal: St. Petersburg Math. J. 24 (2013), 529–553 doi:10.1090/S1061-0022-2013-01252-0
- with D. Mayer and A. Momeni: Congruence properties of induced representations and their applications, Original publication: Algebra i Analiz, tom 26 (2014), nomer 4. Journal: St. Petersburg Math. J. 26 (2015), 593–606 doi:10.1090/spmj/1352

=== Books ===
- Spectral theory of automorphic functions, American Mathematical Society 1983
- Spectral theory of automorphic functions and its applications, Kluwer 1990; 2012 reprint. Springer. 6 December 2012. ISBN 9789400918924; pbk
