= Slapy (Prague-West District) =

- Municipality
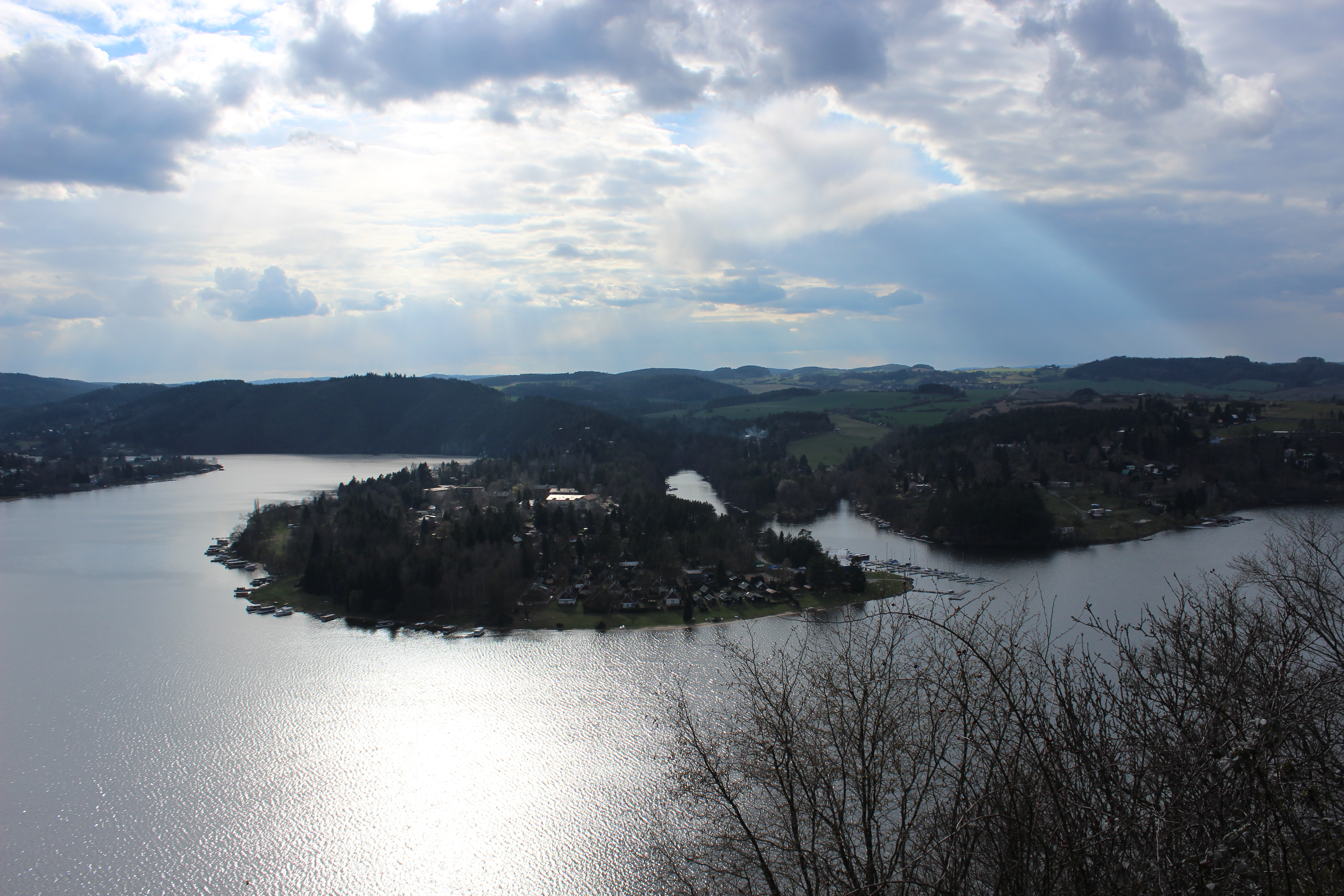
- Slapy Reservoir and Slapy village

- Flag Coat of arms

- Location in the Czech Republic
- Coordinates: 49°48′55″N 14°23′46″E
- Country: Czech Republic
- Region: Central Bohemian
- District: Prague-West
- First mentioned: 1292

Area
  - Total: 20.24 km^{2} (7.81 sq mi)
- Elevation: 358 m (1,175 ft)

Population (2026-01-01)
  - Total: 925
  - Density: 45.7/km^{2} (118/sq mi)
- Time zone: UTC+1 (CET)
  - Summer (DST): UTC+2 (CEST)
- Postal code: 252 08
- Website: www.slapynadvltavou.cz

Slapy is a municipality and village in Prague-West District in the Central Bohemian Region of the Czech Republic. It has about 900 inhabitants. It is located on the shore of Slapy Reservoir.

== Demographics ==
Historical population
Year	Pop.	±%
1869	777	—
1880	1,006	+29.5%
1890	911	−9.4%
1900	868	−4.7%
1910	900	+3.7%
1921	833	−7.4%
1930	886	+6.4%
1950	1,030	+16.3%
1961	829	−19.5%
1970	710	−14.4%
1980	691	−2.7%
1991	595	−13.9%
2001	627	+5.4%
2011	871	+38.9%
2021	907	+4.1%
Source: Censuses
