= Axis powers =

Major alliance of World War II

Axis powers: Achsenmächte (German); Potenze dell'Asse (Italian); 樞軸國, Sūjikukoku (Japanese)
- 1936–1945
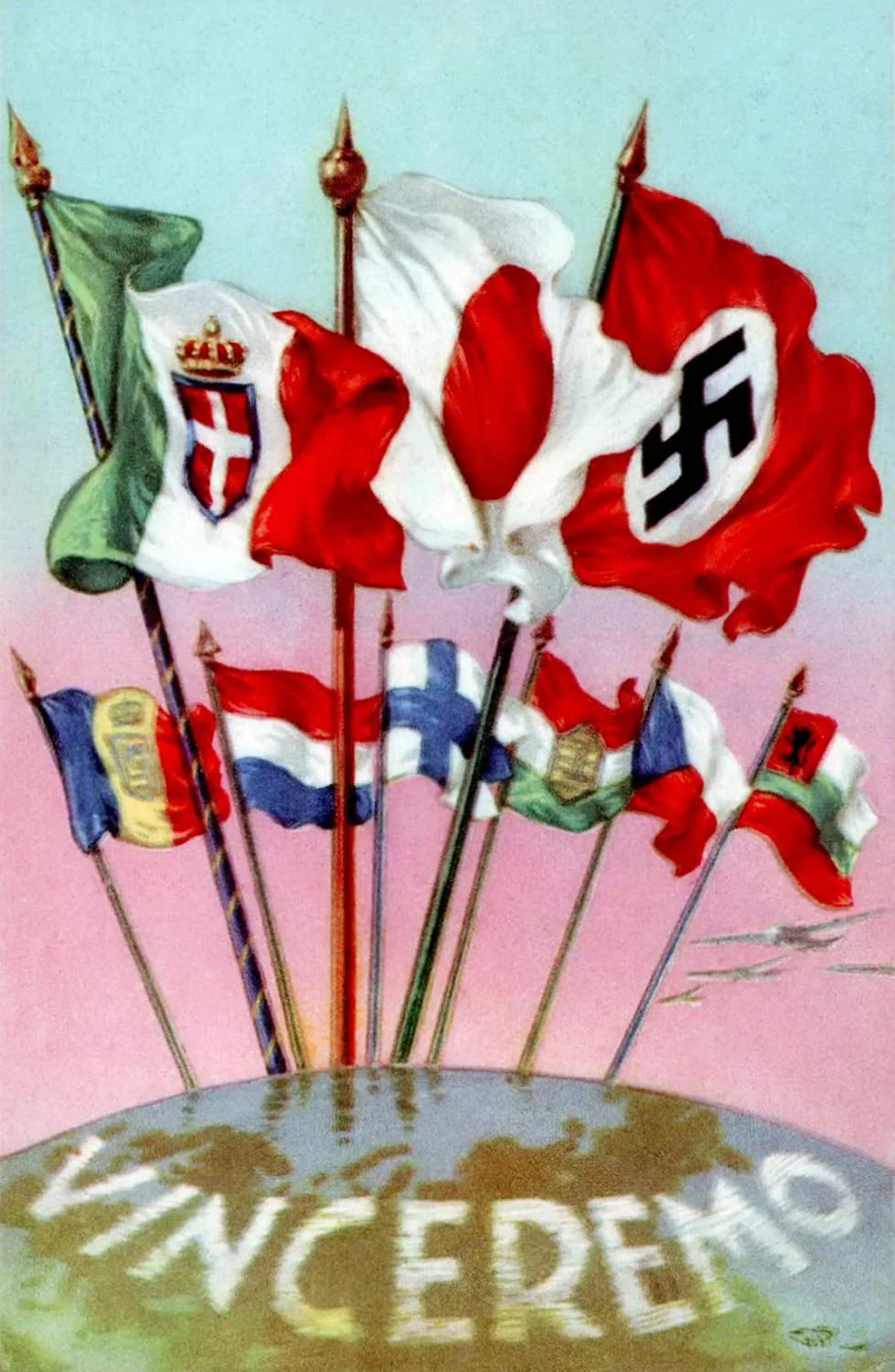
- "We will win", 1941 Italian propaganda poster showing the flags of contemporary Axis members Major Axis powers: (Note: Germany, Italy, and Japan are typically described as being the "major" (or similar) countries amongst the Axis powers (see e.g., Global Strategy, Momah, p. 71, or Encyclopedia of World War II, Tucker & Roberts, p. 102).): German Reich; Kingdom of Italy (Note: After the Italian surrender in September 1943, the Kingdom of Italy fought as a co-belligerent of the Allies, whereas the Italian Social Republic, a German puppet state, was formed in northern Italy and existed until the surrender on 29 April 1945.); Empire of Japan; Other Axis states: Kingdom of Hungary (Note: Acceded to the Tripartite Pact, generally considered Axis powers (see e.g., Facts About the American Wars, Bowman, p. 432, which includes them in a list of "Axis powers", or The Library of Congress World War II Companion, Wagner, Osborne, & Reyburn, p. 39, which lists them as "The Axis").) (Note: Following Operation Panzerfaust, a German puppet under Ferenc Szálasi from 15 October 1944 onwards (see Germany and the Axis Powers, DiNardo, p. 189).); Kingdom of Romania; Slovak Republic (Note: Puppet state installed by the Axis powers (see e.g., Axis Rule in Occupied Europe, Lemkin, p. 11).); Tsardom of Bulgaria; Republic of Finland (Note: Official position of wartime government was that they were a co-belligerent of the Axis against the USSR and United Kingdom during the Continuation War, but generally considered to be a member of the Axis (see e.g., Bowman, p. 432, Wagner, Osborne, & Reyburn p. 39, or Dinardo p. 95).); Independent State of Croatia; Kingdom of Thailand (Note: Declared war on the United Kingdom and United States in alliance with Japan on 25 January 1942, generally considered to be a member of the Axis (e.g. Bowman, p. 432).)
- Status: Military alliance
- Historical era: World War II
  - Anti-Comintern Pact: 25 November 1936
  - Pact of Steel: 22 May 1939
  - Tripartite Pact: 27 September 1940
  - Defeated: 2 September 1945
- Footnotes

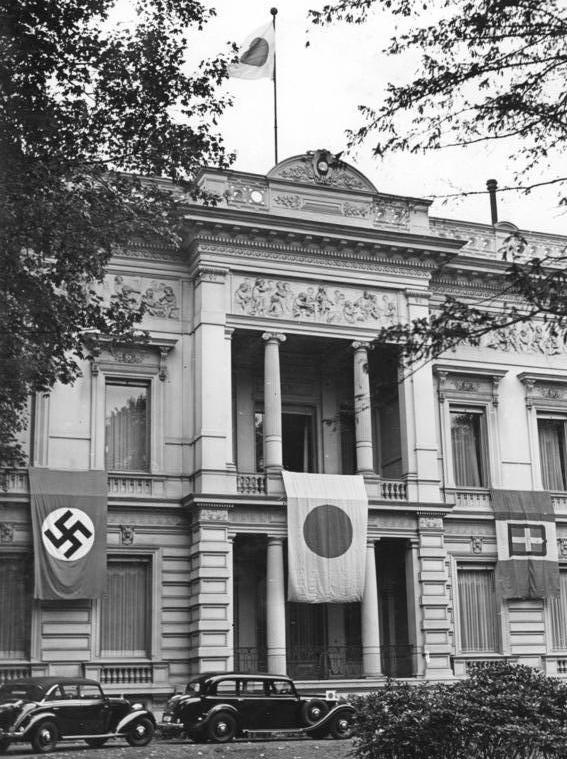
Flags of Germany, Japan, and Italy draping the facade of the Embassy of Japan on the Tiergartenstraße in Berlin (September 1940)

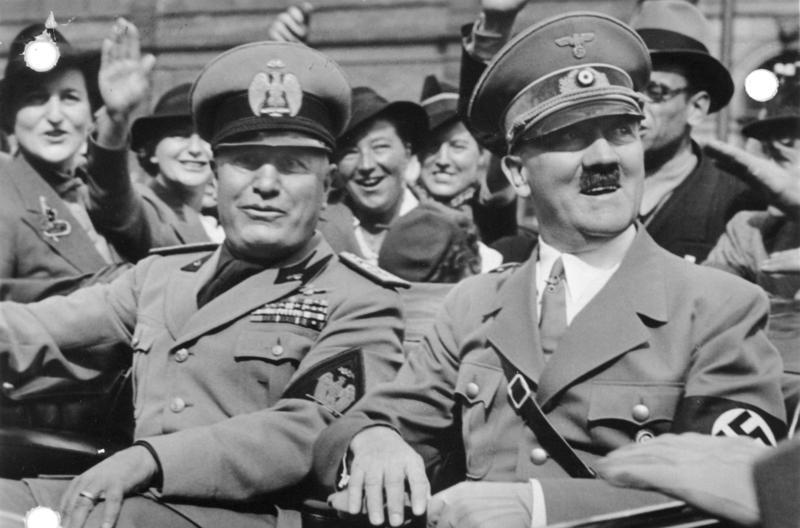
Germany's Führer Adolf Hitler (right) beside Italy's Duce Benito Mussolini (left)

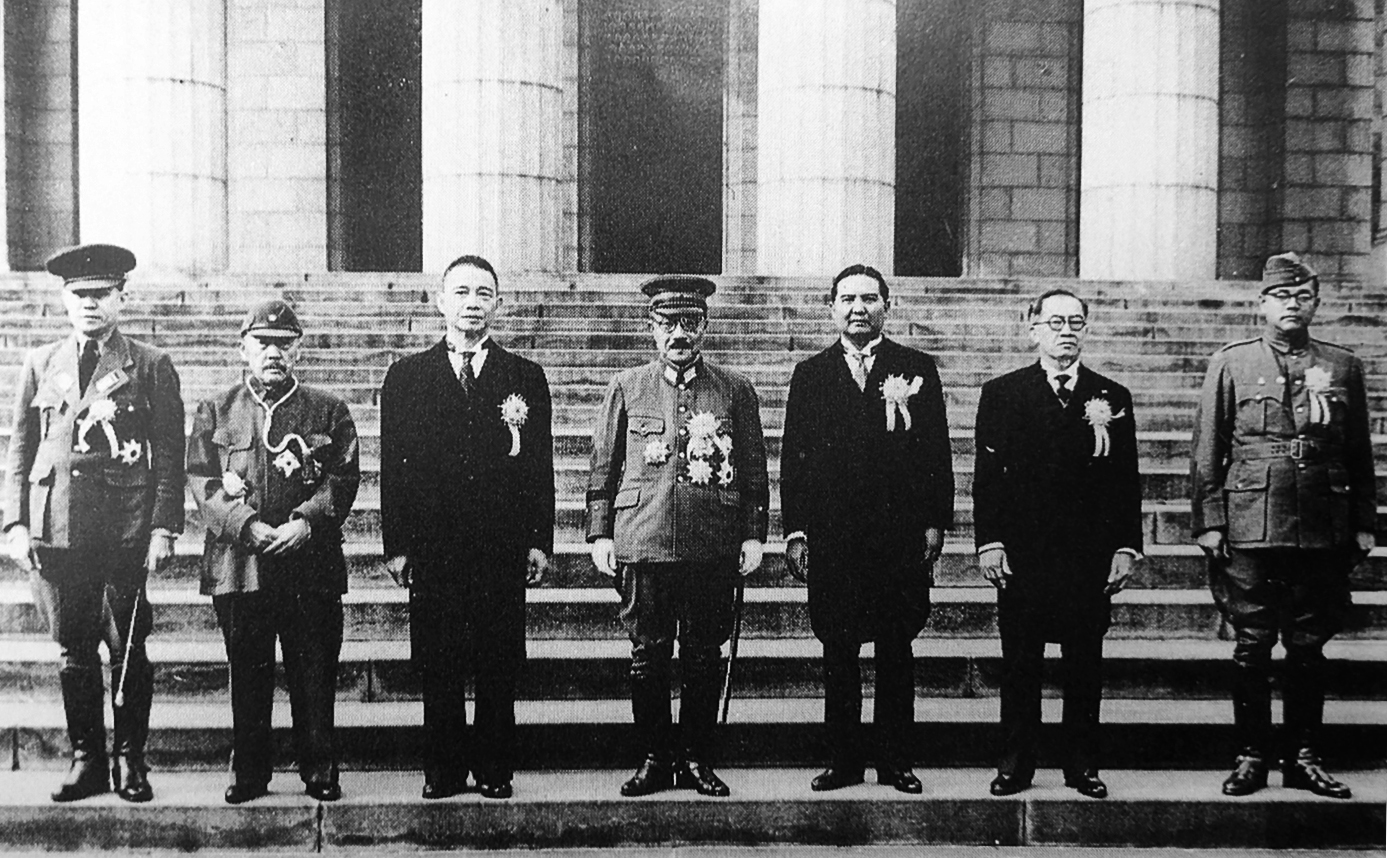
Japan's Prime Minister Hideki Tojo (center) with fellow government representatives of the Greater East Asia Co-Prosperity Sphere. To the left of Tojo, from left to right: Ba Maw from Burma, Zhang Jinghui, Wang Jingwei from China. To the right of Tojo, from left to right, Wan Waithayakon from Thailand, José P. Laurel from the Philippines, and Subhas Chandra Bose from India.

The signing of the Tripartite Pact by Germany, Japan, and Italy on 27 September 1940 in Berlin. Seated from left to right are the Japanese ambassador to Germany Saburō Kurusu, Italian Minister of Foreign Affairs Galeazzo Ciano, and Adolf Hitler.

The Axis powers, (Note: German: Achsenmächte [ˈaksn̩ˌmɛçtə]; Italian: Potenze dell'Asse [poˈtɛntse delˈlasse]; Japanese: 枢軸国 Sūjikukoku [sɯːdʑikɯꜜkokɯ]) originally called the Rome–Berlin Axis and later, the Rome–Berlin–Tokyo Axis, was the military coalition which initiated World War II and fought against the Allies. Its principal members were Nazi Germany, the Kingdom of Italy and the Empire of Japan. The leading powers of the Axis, as well as most other members, were united in the similar far-right positions and general opposition to the Allies, but otherwise lacked comparable coordination and ideological cohesion.

The Axis grew out of successive diplomatic efforts by Germany, Italy, and Japan to secure their own specific expansionist interests in the mid-1930s. The first step was the protocol signed by Germany and Italy in October 1936, after which Italian leader Benito Mussolini declared that all other European countries would thereafter rotate on the Rome–Berlin axis, thus creating the term "Axis". The following November saw the ratification of the Anti-Comintern Pact, an anti-communist treaty between Germany and Japan; Italy joined the Pact in 1937, followed by Hungary and Spain in 1939. The "Rome–Berlin Axis" became a military alliance in 1939 under the so-called "Pact of Steel", with the Tripartite Pact of 1940 formally integrating the military aims of Germany, Italy, Japan, and later followed by other nations. The three pacts formed the foundation of the Axis alliance.

At its zenith in 1942, the Axis presided over large parts of Europe, North Africa, and East Asia, either through occupation, annexation, or puppet states. In contrast to the Allies, there were no three-way summit meetings, and cooperation and coordination were minimal; on occasion, the interests of the major Axis powers were even at variance with each other. The Axis ultimately came to an end with its defeat in 1945.

Particularly within Europe, the use of the term "the Axis" sometimes refers solely to the alliance between Italy and Germany, though outside Europe it is normally understood as including Japan.

== Origins and creation ==
The term "axis" was first applied to the Italo-German relationship by the Italian prime minister Benito Mussolini in September 1923, when he wrote in the preface to Roberto Suster's La Germania Repubblicana that "there is no doubt that in this moment the axis of European history passes through Berlin" (non v'ha dubbio che in questo momento l'asse della storia europea passa per Berlino). At the time, he was seeking an alliance with the Weimar Republic against Yugoslavia and France in the dispute over the Free State of Fiume.

The term was used by Hungary's prime minister Gyula Gömbös when advocating an alliance of Hungary with Germany and Italy in the early 1930s. Gömbös' efforts did affect the Italo-Hungarian Rome Protocols, but his sudden death in 1936 while negotiating with Germany in Munich and the arrival of Kálmán Darányi, his successor, ended Hungary's involvement in pursuing a trilateral axis. Contentious negotiations between the Italian foreign minister, Galeazzo Ciano, and the German ambassador, Ulrich von Hassell, resulted in a Nine-Point Protocol, signed by Ciano and his German counterpart, Konstantin von Neurath, in 1936. When Mussolini publicly announced the signing on 1 November, he proclaimed the creation of a Rome–Berlin axis.

=== Initial proposals of a German–Italian alliance ===
Italy under Duce Benito Mussolini had pursued a strategic alliance of Italy with Germany against France since the early 1920s. Prior to becoming head of government in Italy as leader of the Italian Fascist movement, Mussolini had advocated alliance with defeated Germany after the Paris Peace Conference (1919–1920) settled World War I. He believed that Italy could expand its influence in Europe by allying with Germany against France. In early 1923, as a goodwill gesture to Germany, Italy secretly delivered weapons for the Reichswehr, which had faced major disarmament under the provisions of the Treaty of Versailles.

Since the 1920s Italy had identified the year 1935 as a crucial date for preparing for a war against France, as 1935 was the year when Germany's obligations under the Treaty of Versailles were scheduled to expire. Meetings took place in Berlin in 1924 between Italian General Luigi Capello and prominent figures in the German military, such as von Seeckt and Erich Ludendorff, over military collaboration between Germany and Italy. The discussions concluded that Germans still wanted a war of revenge against France but were short on weapons and hoped that Italy could assist Germany.

However at this time Mussolini stressed one important condition that Italy must pursue in an alliance with Germany: that Italy "must ... tow them, not be towed by them". Italian foreign minister Dino Grandi in the early 1930s stressed the importance of "decisive weight", involving Italy's relations between France and Germany, in which he recognized that Italy was not yet a major power, but perceived that Italy did have strong enough influence to alter the political situation in Europe by placing the weight of its support onto one side or another, and sought to balance relations between the three.

=== Danube alliance, dispute over Austria ===
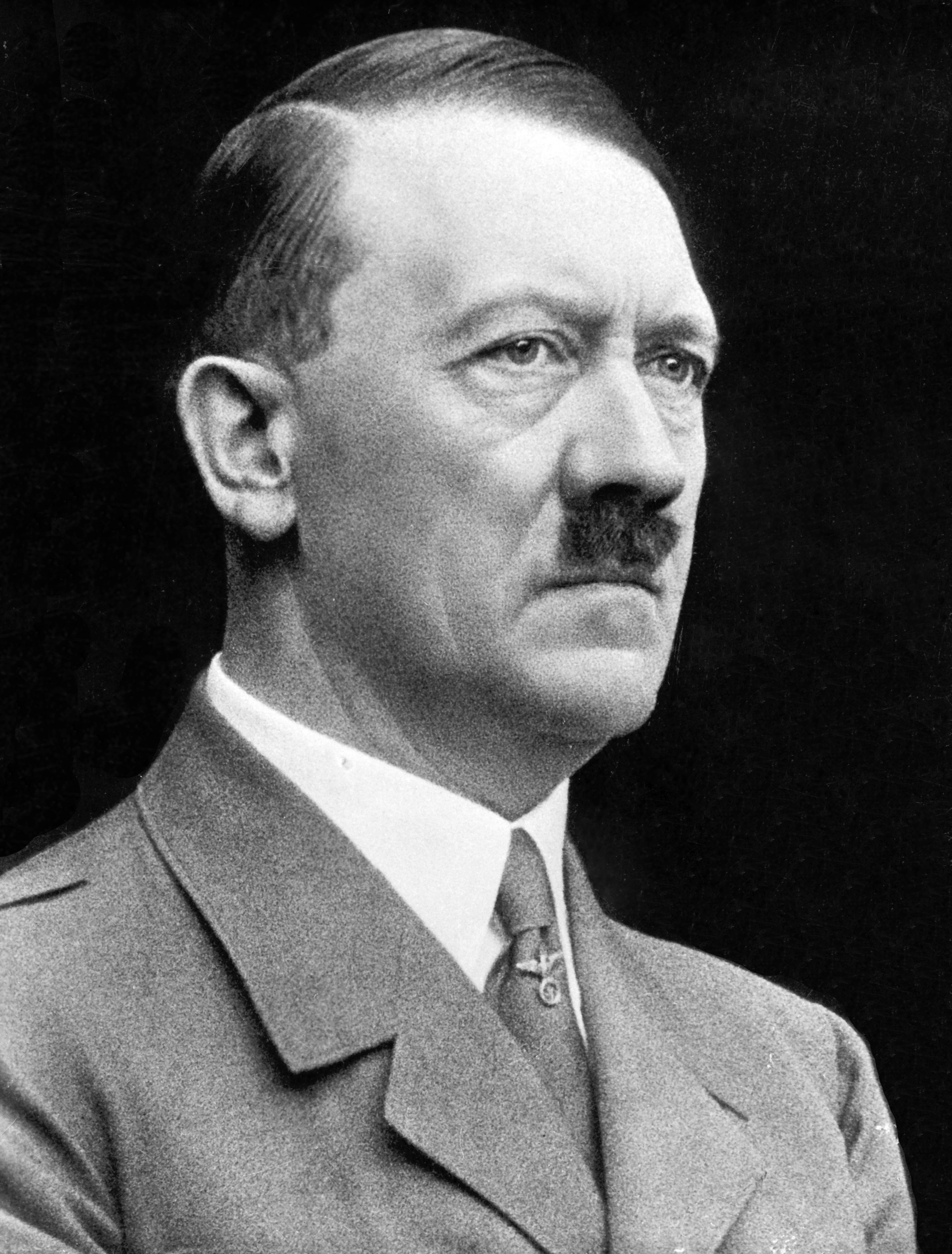
Adolf Hitler, Führer and Reich Chancellor of the German People, 1933–1945

In 1933, Adolf Hitler and the Nazi Party came to power in Germany. Hitler had advocated an alliance between Germany and Italy since the 1920s. Shortly after being appointed Chancellor of Germany, Hitler sent a personal message to Mussolini, declaring "admiration and homage" and declaring his anticipation of the prospects of German–Italian friendship and even alliance. Hitler was aware that Italy held concerns over potential German land claims on South Tyrol, and assured Mussolini that Germany was not interested in South Tyrol. Hitler in Mein Kampf had declared that South Tyrol was a non-issue considering the advantages that would be gained from a German–Italian alliance. After Hitler's rise to power, the Four Power Directorate proposal by Italy had been looked at with interest by Britain, but Hitler was not committed to it, resulting in Mussolini urging Hitler to consider the diplomatic advantages Germany would gain by breaking out of isolation by entering the Directorate and avoiding an immediate armed conflict. The Four Power Directorate proposal stipulated that Germany would no longer be required to have limited arms and would be granted the right to re-armament under foreign supervision in stages. Hitler completely rejected the idea of controlled rearmament under foreign supervision.

Mussolini did not trust Hitler's intentions regarding Anschluss nor Hitler's promise of no territorial claims on South Tyrol. Mussolini informed Hitler that he was satisfied with the presence of the anti-Marxist government of Engelbert Dollfuss in the First Austrian Republic, and warned Hitler that he was adamantly opposed to Anschluss. Hitler responded in contempt to Mussolini that he intended "to throw Dollfuss into the sea". With this disagreement over Austria, relations between Hitler and Mussolini steadily became more distant.

Hitler attempted to break the impasse with Italy over Austria by sending Hermann Göring to negotiate with Mussolini in 1933 to convince Mussolini to press Austria to appoint Austrian Nazis to the government. Göring claimed that Nazi domination of Austria was inevitable and that Italy should accept this, as well as repeating to Mussolini of Hitler's promise to "regard the question of the South Tyrol frontier as finally liquidated by the peace treaties". In response to Göring's visit with Mussolini, Dollfuss immediately went to Italy to counter any German diplomatic headway. Dollfuss claimed that his government was actively challenging Marxists in Austria and claimed that once the Marxists were defeated in Austria, that support for Austria's Nazis would decline.

In June 1934, Hitler and Mussolini met for the first time, in Venice. The meeting did not proceed amicably. Hitler demanded that Mussolini compromise on Austria by pressuring Dollfuss to appoint Austrian Nazis to his cabinet, to which Mussolini flatly refused the demand. In response, Hitler promised that he would accept Austria's independence for the time being, saying that due to the internal tensions in Germany (referring to sections of the Nazi Sturmabteilung that Hitler would soon kill in the Night of the Long Knives) that Germany could not afford to provoke Italy. Galeazzo Ciano told the press that the two leaders had made a "gentleman's agreement" to avoid interfering in Austria.

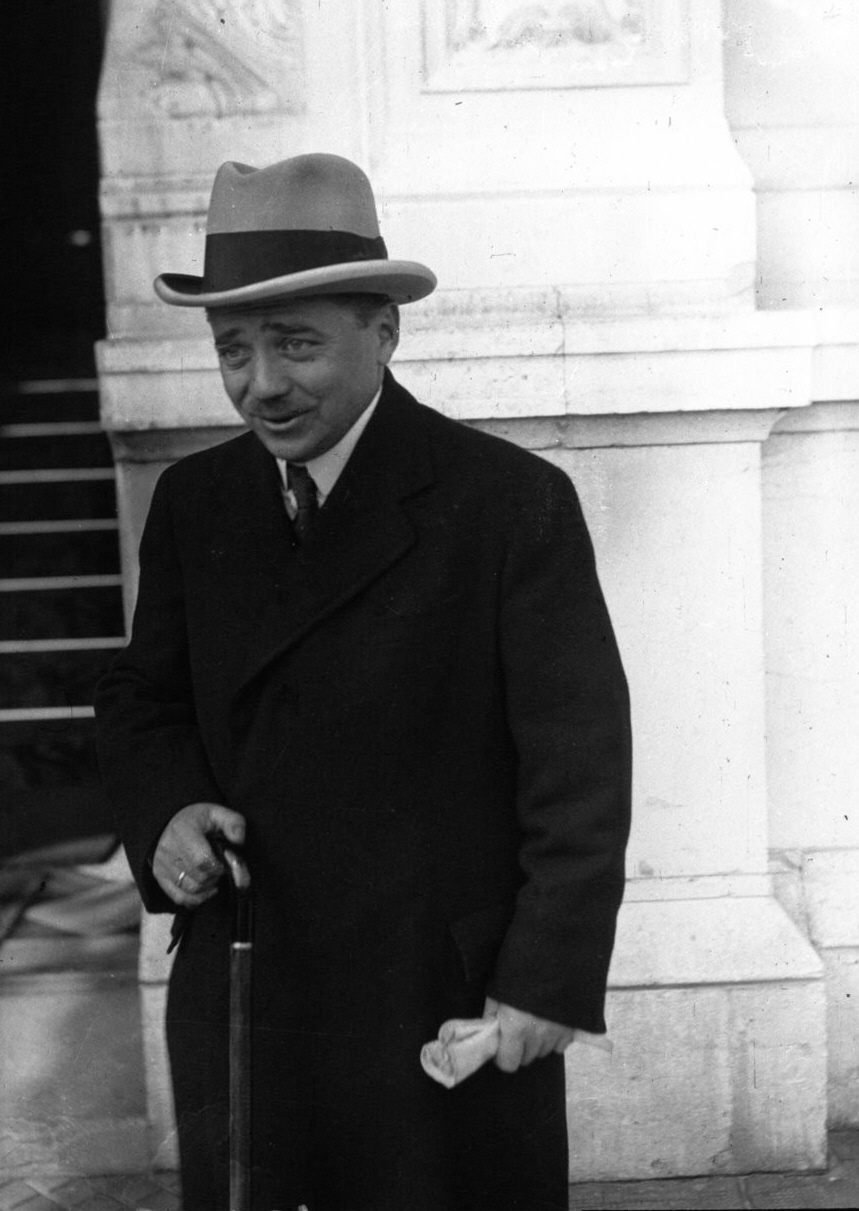
Engelbert Dollfuss, Chancellor of Austria, 1932–1934

Several weeks after the Venice meeting, on 25 July 1934, Austrian Nazis assassinated Dollfuss. Mussolini was outraged as he held Hitler directly responsible for the assassination that violated Hitler's promise made only weeks ago to respect Austrian independence. Mussolini rapidly deployed several army divisions and air squadrons to the Brenner Pass, and warned that a German move against Austria would result in war between Germany and Italy. Hitler responded by both denying Nazi responsibility for the assassination and issuing orders to dissolve all ties between the German Nazi Party and its Austrian branch, which Germany claimed was responsible for the political crisis.

Italy effectively abandoned diplomatic relations with Germany while turning to France in order to challenge Germany's intransigence by signing a Franco–Italian accord to protect Austrian independence. French and Italian military staff discussed possible military cooperation involving a war with Germany should Hitler dare to attack Austria.

Relations between Germany and Italy recovered due to Hitler's support of Italy's invasion of Ethiopia in 1935, while other countries condemned the invasion and advocated sanctions against Italy.

=== Development of German–Italian–Japanese alliance ===
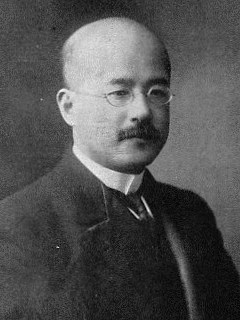
Hideo Kodama, a wartime cabinet minister in the Empire of Japan

Interest in Germany and Japan in forming an alliance began when Japanese diplomat Hiroshi Ōshima visited Joachim von Ribbentrop in Berlin in 1935. Although at the time Japan was unwilling to make an alliance against the United Kingdom and France, Oshima informed von Ribbentrop of Japan's interest in forming a German–Japanese alliance against the Soviet Union. Von Ribbentrop expanded on Oshima's proposal by advocating that the alliance be based in a political context of a pact to oppose the Comintern. The proposed pact was met with mixed reviews in Japan, with a faction of ultra-nationalists within the government supporting the pact while the Imperial Japanese Navy and the Japanese Foreign Ministry were staunchly opposed to the pact. There was great concern in the Japanese government that such a pact with Germany could disrupt Japan's relations with Britain, endangering years of a beneficial Anglo-Japanese accord, that had allowed Japan to ascend in the international community in the first place. The response to the pact was met with similar division in Germany; while the proposed pact was popular amongst the upper echelons of the Nazi Party, it was opposed by many in the Foreign Ministry, the Army, and the business community who held financial interests in the Republic of China to which Japan was hostile.

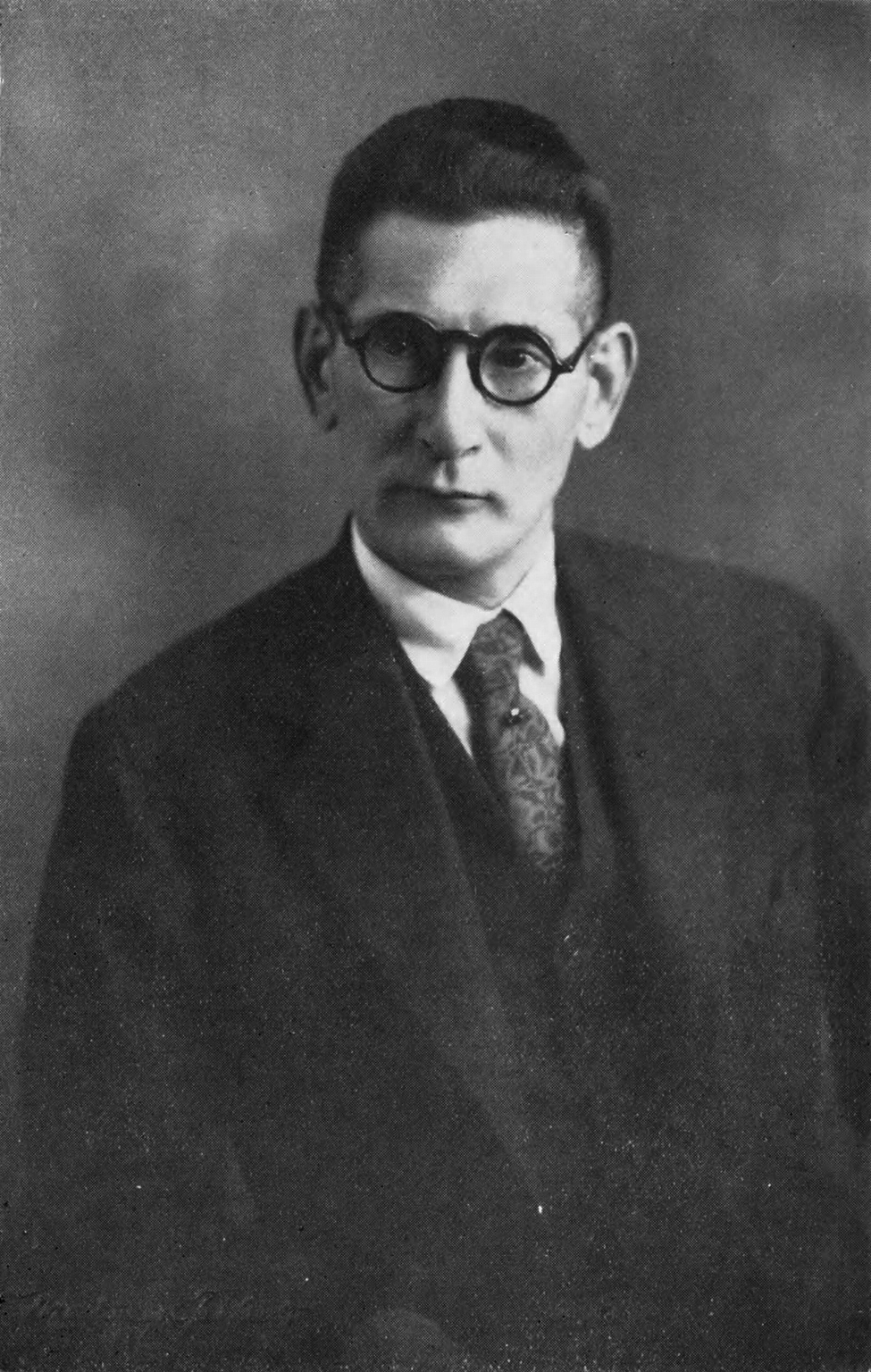
Japanese writer Shūmei Ōkawa, a key exponent of Japanese nationalism

On learning of German–Japanese negotiations, Italy also began to take an interest in forming an alliance with Japan. Italy had hoped that, due to Japan's long-term close relations with Britain, an Italo-Japanese alliance would pressure Britain into adopting a more accommodating stance towards Italy in the Mediterranean. In the summer of 1936, Italian Foreign Minister Galeazzo Ciano informed the Japanese Ambassador to Italy, Sugimura Yotaro, "I have heard that a Japanese–German agreement concerning the Soviet Union has been reached, and I think it would be natural for a similar agreement to be made between Italy and Japan." Initially, Japan's attitude towards Italy's proposal was generally dismissive, viewing a German–Japanese alliance against the Soviet Union as being imperative while regarding an Italo-Japanese alliance as being secondary, as Japan anticipated that an Italo-Japanese alliance would antagonize a Britain that had condemned Italy's invasion of Ethiopia. Japan's attitude regarding Italy altered in 1937 after the League of Nations had condemned Japan for aggression in China, and Japan faced international isolation, while Italy had remained favourable to Japan. As a result of Italy's support for Japan against international condemnation, Japan took a more positive attitude towards Italy and offered proposals for a non-aggression or neutrality pact with Italy.

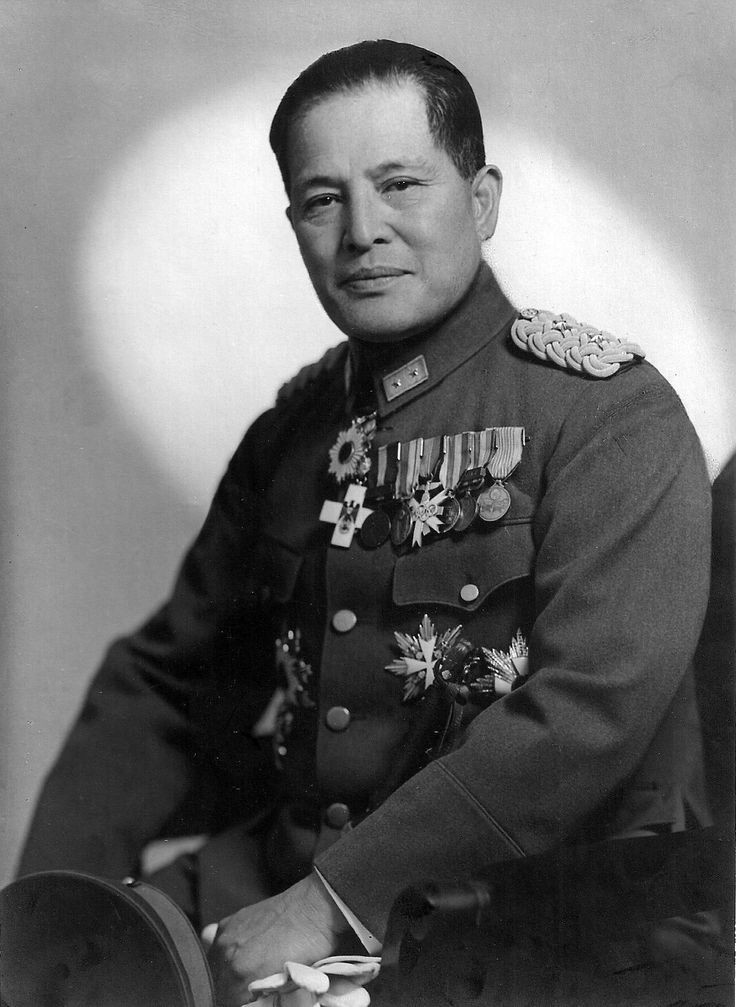
Lt.Gen Hiroshi Ōshima, Japanese ambassador to Germany before and during World War II

The Tripartite Pact was signed by Germany, Italy, and Japan on 27 September 1940, in Berlin. The pact was subsequently joined by Hungary (20 November 1940), Romania (23 November 1940), Slovakia (24 November 1940), and Bulgaria (1 March 1941).

== Ideology ==
The Axis powers' primary goal was territorial expansion at the expense of their neighbors. It championed a number of variants on fascism, militarism, conservatism and autarky. Creation of territorially contiguous autarkic empires was a common goal of all three major Axis powers.

== Economic resources ==
The Axis population in 1938 was 258.9 million, while the Allied population (excluding the Soviet Union and the United States, which later joined the Allies) was 689.7 million. Thus the Allied powers outnumbered the Axis powers by 2.7 to 1. The leading Axis states had the following domestic populations: Germany 75.5 million (including 6.8 million from recently annexed Austria), Japan 71.9 million (excluding its colonies), and Italy 43.4 million (excluding its colonies). The United Kingdom (excluding its colonies) had a population of 47.5 million and France (excluding its colonies) 42 million.

The wartime gross domestic product (GDP) of the Axis was $911 billion at its highest in 1941 in international dollars by 1990 prices. The GDP of the Allied powers was $1,798 billion. The United States stood at $1,094 billion, more than the Axis combined.

The burden of the war upon participating countries has been measured through the percentage of gross national product (GNP) devoted to military expenditures. Nearly one-quarter of Germany's GNP was committed to the war effort in 1939, and this rose to three-quarters of GNP in 1944, prior to the collapse of the economy. In 1939, Japan committed 22 percent of its GNP to its war effort in China; this rose to three-quarters of GNP in 1944. Italy did not mobilize its economy; its GNP committed to the war effort remained at prewar levels.

Italy and Japan lacked industrial capacity; their economies were small, dependent on international trade, external sources of fuel and other industrial resources. As a result, Italian and Japanese mobilization remained low, even by 1943.

Among the three major Axis powers, Japan had the lowest per capita income, while Germany and Italy had an income level comparable to the United Kingdom.

Romania's oil gave the country a disproportionate importance in the global conflict. In 1940 and 1941, Romania supplied 94% and 75% of Germany's oil imports respectively. Italy – which lacked both natural and synthetic output – was even more reliant on Romanian oil than Germany. The loss of Romania's oil – following the country's defection from the Axis in August 1944 – resulted in Hitler's first admission that the war was lost.

== Major Axis powers ==
=== Germany ===
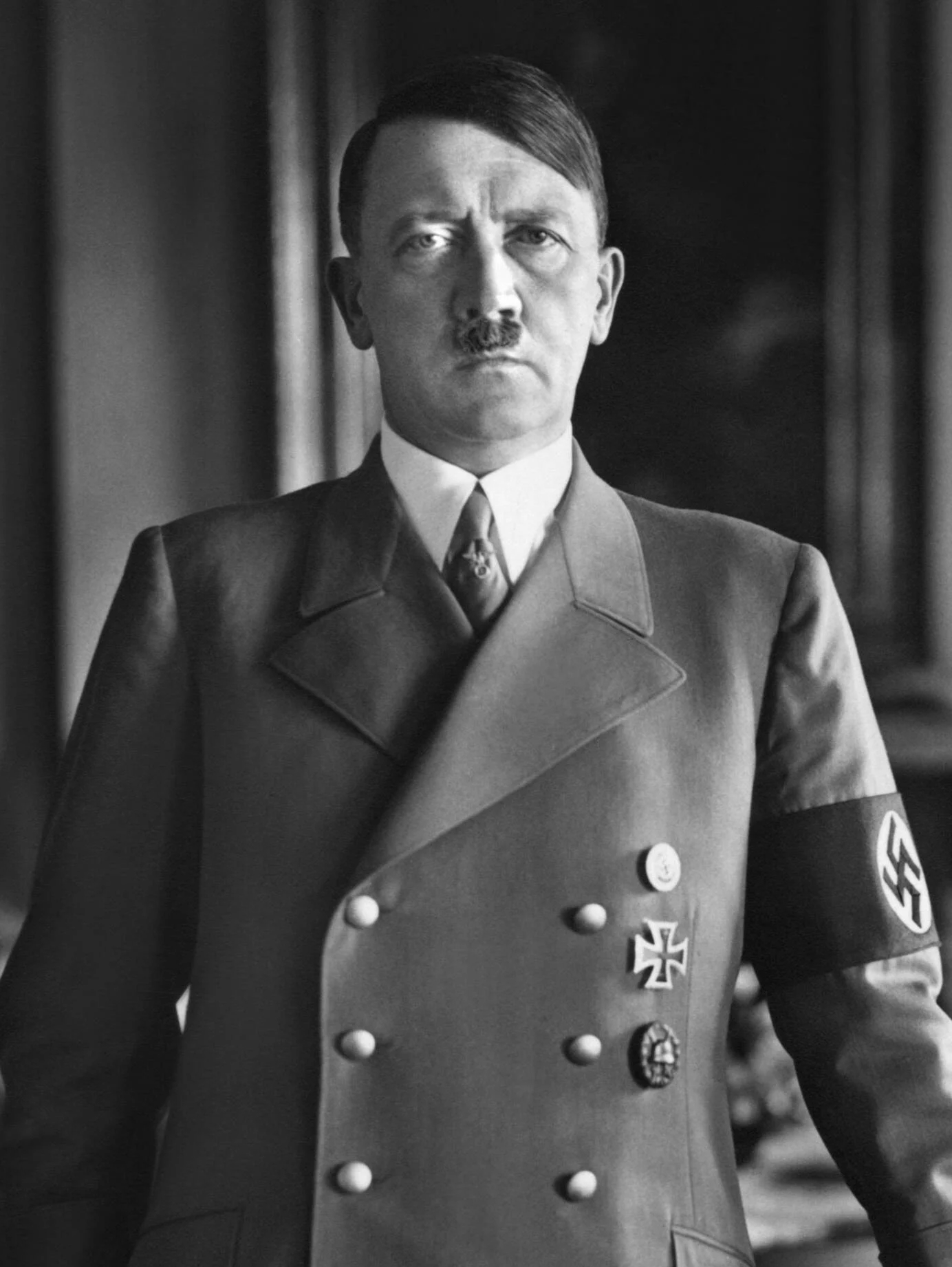
German Führer Adolf Hitler

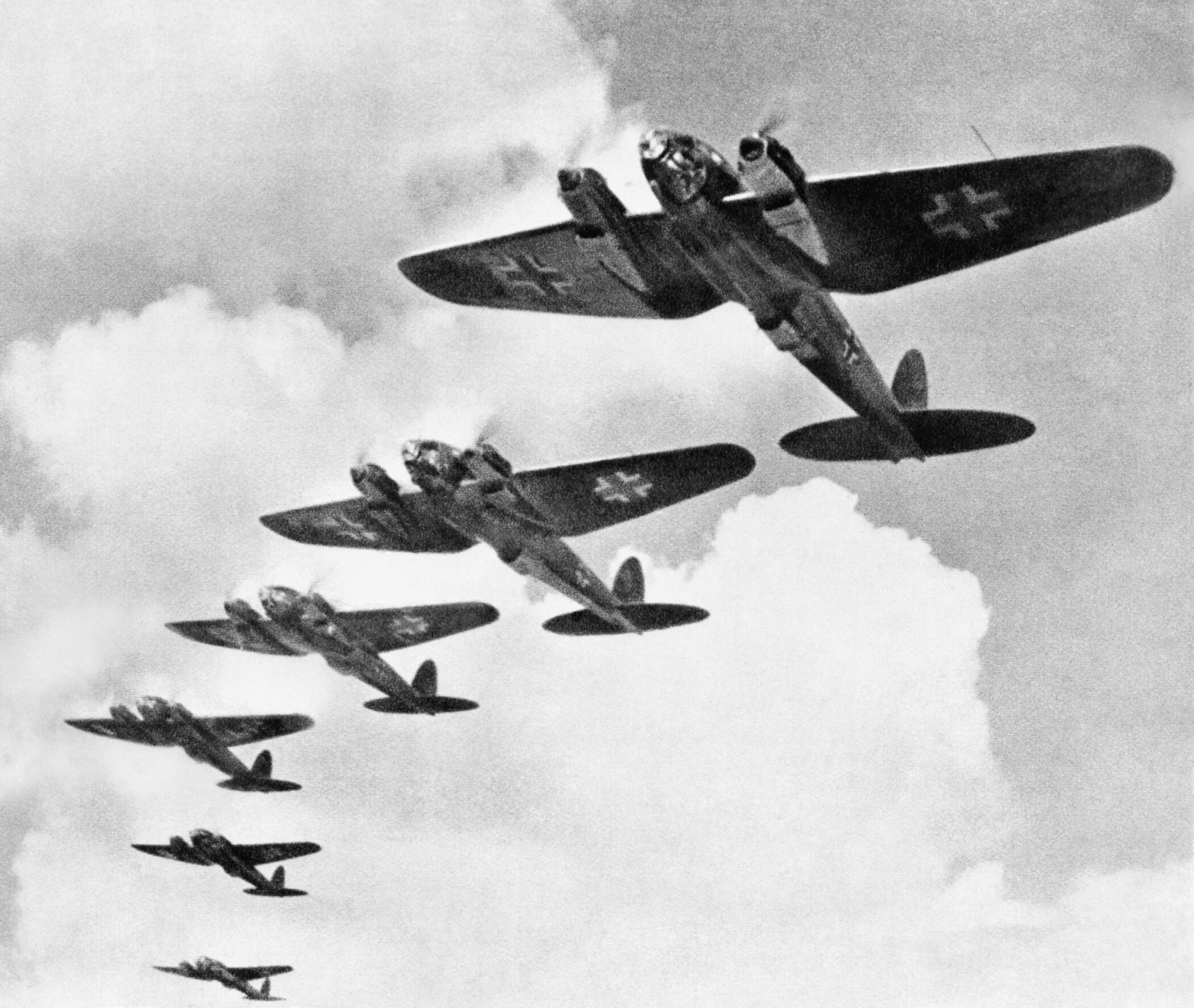
German Heinkel He 111 bomber aircraft during the Battle of Britain

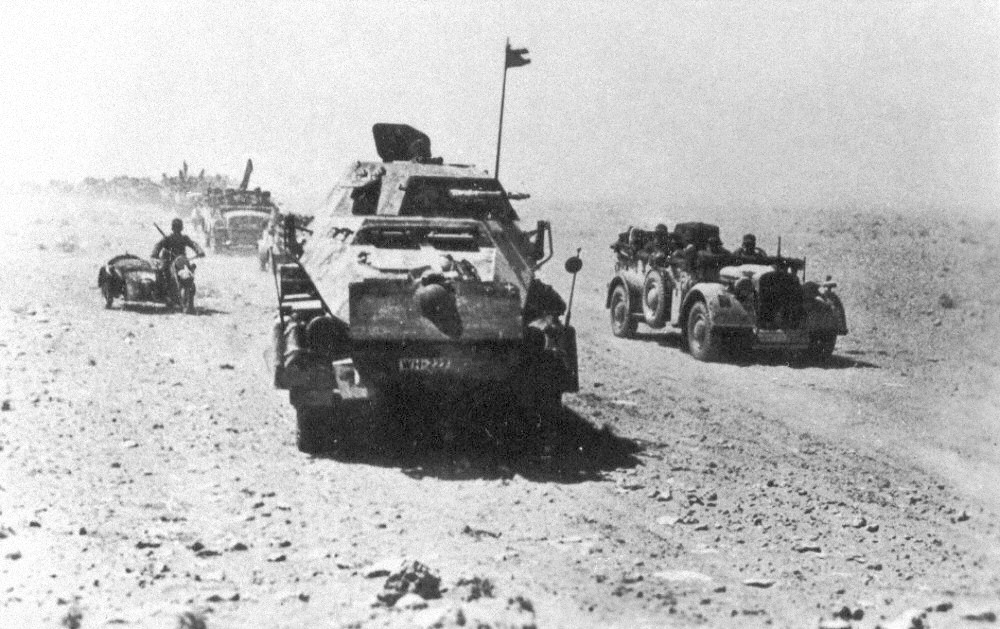
German vehicles advancing during the Second Battle of El Alamein in the North African campaign

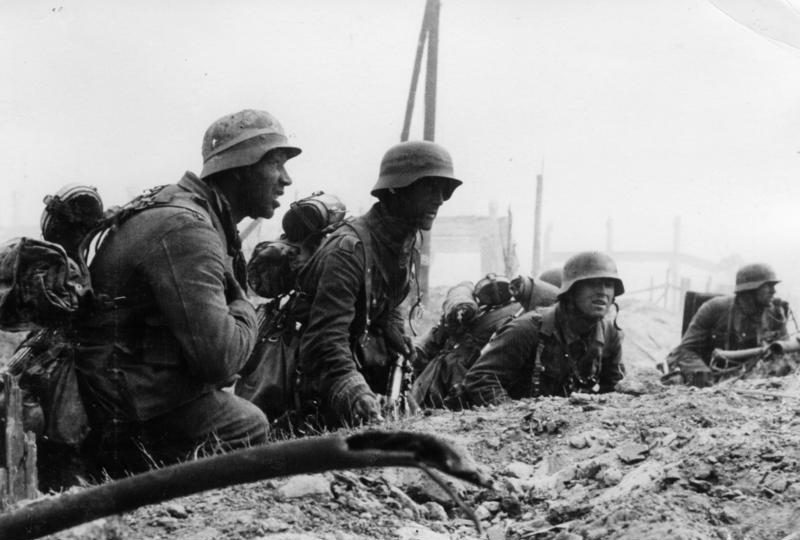
German soldiers during the Battle of Stalingrad in the Eastern Front campaign

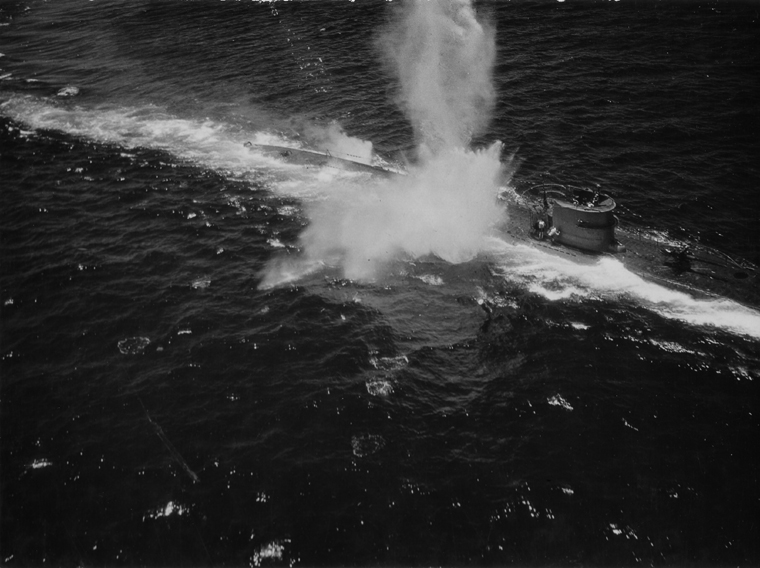
German submarine U-118 under air attack in June 1943

==== War justifications ====
Hitler in 1941 described the outbreak of World War II as the fault of the intervention of Western powers against Germany during its war with Poland, describing it as the result of "the European and American warmongers". Hitler had designs for Germany to become the dominant and leading state in the world, such as his intention for Germany's capital of Berlin to become the Welthauptstadt ("World Capital"), renamed Germania. The German government also justified its actions by claiming that Germany inevitably needed to territorially expand because it was facing an overpopulation crisis that Hitler described: "We are overpopulated and cannot feed ourselves from our own resources". Thus expansion was justified as an inevitable necessity to provide lebensraum ("living space") for the German nation and end the country's overpopulation within existing confined territory, and provide resources necessary to its people's well-being. Since the 1920s, the Nazi Party publicly promoted the expansion of Germany into territories held by the Soviet Union.

Germany justified its war against Poland on the issues of German minority within Poland and Polish opposition to the incorporation of the ethnically German-majority Free City of Danzig into Germany. While Hitler and the Nazi party before taking power openly talked about destroying Poland and were hostile to Poles, after gaining power until February 1939 Hitler tried to conceal his true intentions towards Poland, and signed a 10-year Non-Aggression Pact in 1934, revealing his plans to only to his closest associates. Relations between Germany and Poland altered from the early to the late 1930s, as Germany sought rapprochement with Poland to avoid the risk of Poland entering the Soviet sphere of influence, and appealed to anti-Soviet sentiment in Poland. Hitler even tried to convince Poland to join the Anti-Comintern Pact. The Soviet Union in turn at this time competed with Germany for influence in Poland. At the same time Germany was preparing for a war with Poland and was secretly preparing the German minority in Poland for a war.

A diplomatic crisis erupted following Hitler demanding that the Free City of Danzig be annexed to Germany, as it was led by a Nazi government seeking annexation to Germany. Germany used legal precedents to justify its intervention against Poland and annexation of the Free City of Danzig (led by a local Nazi government that sought incorporation into Germany) in 1939. Poland rejected Germany's demands and Germany in response prepared a general mobilization on the morning of 30 August 1939.

Germany justified its invasion of the Low Countries of Belgium, Luxembourg, and the Netherlands in May 1940 by claiming that it suspected that Britain and France were preparing to use the Low Countries to launch an invasion of the industrial Ruhr region of Germany. When war between Germany versus Britain and France appeared likely in May 1939, Hitler declared that the Netherlands and Belgium would need to be occupied, saying: "Dutch and Belgian air bases must be occupied ... Declarations of neutrality must be ignored". In a conference with Germany's military leaders on 23 November 1939, Hitler declared to the military leaders that "We have an Achilles heel, the Ruhr", and said that "If England and France push through Belgium and Holland into the Ruhr, we shall be in the greatest danger", and thus claimed that Belgium and the Netherlands had to be occupied by Germany to protect Germany from a British-French offensive against the Ruhr, irrespective of their claims to neutrality.

Germany's invasion of the Soviet Union in 1941 involved issues of lebensraum, anti-communism, and Soviet foreign policy. After Germany invaded the Soviet Union in 1941, the Nazi regime's stance towards an independent, territorially-reduced Russia was affected by pressure beginning in 1942 from the German Army on Hitler to endorse a "Russian Liberation Army" led by Andrey Vlasov. Initially the proposal to support an anti-communist Russian army was met with outright rejection by Hitler, however by 1944 as Germany faced mounting losses on the Eastern Front, Vlasov's forces were recognized by Germany as an ally, particularly by Reichsführer-SS Heinrich Himmler.

After the Japanese attack on Pearl Harbor and the outbreak of war between Japan and the United States, Germany supported Japan by declaring war on the US. During the war Germany denounced the Atlantic Charter and the Lend-Lease Act that the US adopted to support the Allied powers prior to entry into the alliance, as imperialism directed at dominating and exploiting countries outside of the continental Americas. Hitler denounced American President Franklin D. Roosevelt's invoking of the term "freedom" to describe US actions in the war, and accused the American meaning of "freedom" to be the freedom for democracy to exploit the world and the freedom for plutocrats within such democracy to exploit the masses.

==== History ====
At the end of World War I, German citizens felt that their country had been humiliated as a result of the Treaty of Versailles, which included a "war guilt clause" and required Germany to pay war reparations and forfeit regions formerly part of the German Empire along with all of its colonies. In 1923 the French occupied the Ruhr region after Germany defaulted on its reparations payments. The government printed money to pay the workers idled through its policy of passive resistance to the occupation and thereby sparked the hyperinflation that seriously damaged the German economy. Although Germany began to improve economically in the mid-1920s, the Great Depression created more economic hardship and a rise in political forces that advocated radical solutions to Germany's woes. The Nazis, under Hitler, promoted the nationalist stab-in-the-back legend stating that Germany had been betrayed by Jews and Communists. The party promised to rebuild Germany as a major power and create a Greater Germany that would include Alsace-Lorraine, Austria, Sudetenland, and other German-populated territories in Europe. The Nazis also aimed to occupy and colonize non-German territories in Poland, the Baltic states, and the Soviet Union, as part of the Nazi policy of seeking Lebensraum ("living space") in Central and Eastern Europe.

Germany renounced the Versailles treaty and remilitarized the Rhineland in March 1936. Germany had already resumed conscription and announced the existence of a German air force, the Luftwaffe, and naval force, the Kriegsmarine in 1935. Germany annexed Austria in 1938, the Sudetenland from Czechoslovakia, and the Memel territory from Lithuania in 1939. Germany then invaded the rest of Czechoslovakia in 1939, creating the Protectorate of Bohemia and Moravia and the country of Slovakia.

On 23 August 1939, Germany and the Soviet Union signed the Molotov–Ribbentrop Pact, which contained a secret protocol dividing eastern Europe into spheres of influence. Germany's invasion of its part of Poland under the Pact eight days later triggered the beginning of World War II. By the end of 1941, Germany occupied a large part of Europe and its military forces were fighting the Soviet Union, nearly capturing Moscow. However, crushing defeats at the Battle of Stalingrad and the Battle of Kursk devastated the German armed forces. This, combined with Western Allied landings in France and Italy, led to a three-front war that depleted Germany's armed forces and resulted in Germany's defeat in 1945.

==== Occupied territories ====
The Protectorate of Bohemia and Moravia was created from the dismemberment of Czechoslovakia. Shortly after Germany annexed the Sudetenland region of Czechoslovakia, the Slovak Republic declared its independence from the rump Second Czechoslovak Republic. The new Slovak State allied itself with Germany. The remainder of the country was occupied by German military forces and organized into the Protectorate. Czech civil institutions were preserved but the Protectorate was considered within the sovereign territory of Germany.

The General Government was the name given to the territories of occupied Poland that were not directly annexed into German provinces, but like Bohemia and Moravia was considered within the sovereign territory of Germany by the Nazi authorities.

Reichskommissariats were established in the Netherlands, Belgium, and Norway, designated as places the "Germanic" populations of which were to be incorporated into the planned Greater Germanic Reich. By contrast the Reichskommissariats established in the east (Reichskommissariat Ostland in the Baltics, Reichskommissariat Ukraine in Ukraine) were established as colonies for settlement by Germans.

In Norway, under Reichskommissariat Norwegen, the Quisling regime, headed by Vidkun Quisling, was installed by the Germans as a client regime during the occupation, while king Haakon VII and the legal government were in exile. Quisling encouraged Norwegians to serve as volunteers in the Waffen-SS, collaborated in the deportation of Jews, and was responsible for the executions of members of the Norwegian resistance movement. About 45,000 Norwegian collaborators joined the pro-Nazi party Nasjonal Samling (National Union), and some police units helped arrest many Jews. However, Norway was one of the first countries where resistance during World War II was widespread before the turning point of the war in 1943. After the war, Quisling and other collaborators were executed. Quisling's name has become an international eponym for traitor.

=== Italy ===
==== War justifications ====
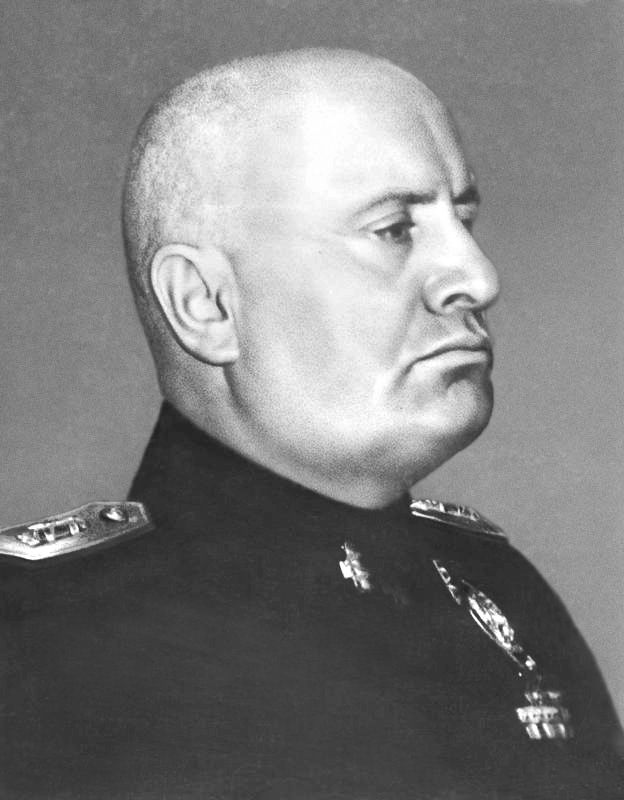
The Duce Benito Mussolini in an official portrait

Duce Benito Mussolini described Italy's declaration of war against the Western Allies of Britain and France in June 1940 as the following: "We are going to war against the plutocratic and reactionary democracies of the West who have invariably hindered the progress and often threatened the very existence of the Italian people". Italy condemned the Western powers for enacting sanctions on Italy in 1935 for its actions in the Second Italo-Ethiopian War that Italy claimed was a response to an act of Ethiopian aggression against tribesmen in Italian Eritrea in the Walwal incident of 1934. Italy, like Germany, also justified its actions by claiming that Italy needed to territorially expand to provide spazio vitale ("vital space") for the Italian nation.

In October 1938 in the aftermath of the Munich Agreement, Italy demanded concessions from France to yield to Italy in Africa. Relations between Italy and France deteriorated with France's refusal to accept Italy's demands. France responded to Italy's demands with threatening naval manoeuvres as a warning to Italy. As tensions between Italy and France grew, Hitler made a major speech on 30 January 1939 in which he promised German military support in the case of an unprovoked war against Italy.

Italy entered World War II on 10 June 1940. Italy justified its intervention against Greece in October 1940 on the allegation that the Kingdom of Greece was being used by Britain against Italy, Mussolini informed this to Hitler, saying: "Greece is one of the main points of English maritime strategy in the Mediterranean".

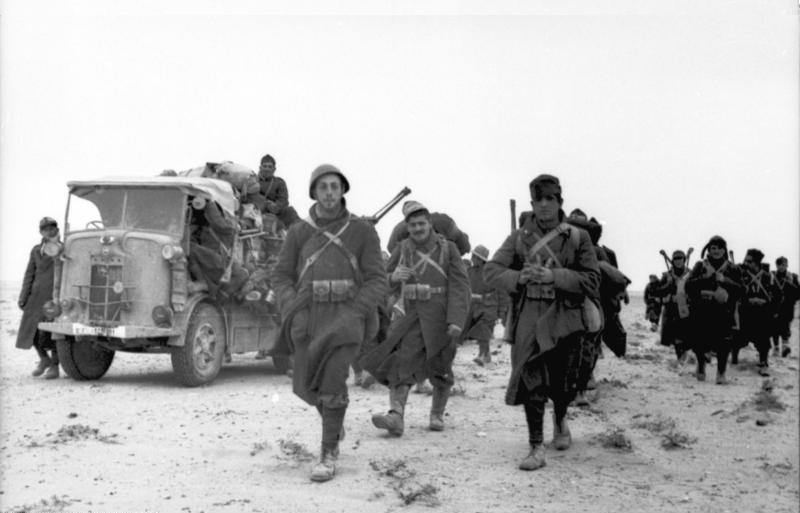
Italian soldiers in the North African Campaign in 1941

Italy justified its intervention against Yugoslavia in April 1941 by appealing to both Italian irredentist claims and the fact of Albanian, Croatian, and Macedonian separatists not wishing to be part of Yugoslavia. Croatian separatism soared after the assassination of Croatian political leaders in the National Assembly of Yugoslavia in 1928 including the death of Stjepan Radić, and Italy endorsed Croatian separatist Ante Pavelić and his fascist Ustaše movement that was based and trained in Italy with the Fascist regime's support prior to intervention against Yugoslavia.

==== History ====
The intention of the Fascist regime was to create a "New Roman Empire" in which Italy would dominate the Mediterranean. In 1935–1936 Italy invaded and annexed Ethiopia and the Fascist government proclaimed the creation of the "Italian Empire". Protests by the League of Nations, especially the British, who had interests in that area, led to no serious action, although The League did try to enforce economic sanctions upon Italy, but to no avail. The incident highlighted French and British weakness, exemplified by their reluctance to alienate Italy and lose her as their ally. The limited actions taken by the Western powers pushed Mussolini's Italy towards alliance with Hitler's Germany anyway. In 1937 Italy left the League of Nations and joined the Anti-Comintern Pact, which had been signed by Germany and Japan the preceding year. In March/April 1939 Italian troops invaded and annexed Albania. Germany and Italy signed the Pact of Steel on May 22.

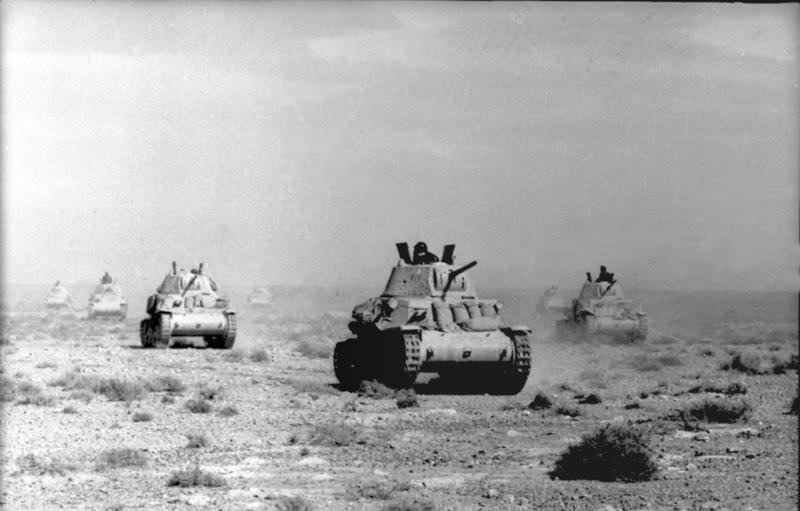
Italian Fiat M13/40 tanks in the North African Campaign in 1941

Italy was ill-prepared for war, in spite of the fact that it had continuously been involved in conflict since 1935, first with Ethiopia in 1935–1936 and then in the Spanish Civil War on the side of Francisco Franco's Nationalists. Mussolini refused to heed warnings from his minister of exchange and currency, Felice Guarneri, who said that Italy's actions in Ethiopia and Spain meant that Italy was on the verge of bankruptcy. By 1939 military expenditures by Britain and France far exceeded what Italy could afford. As a result of Italy's economic difficulties its soldiers were poorly paid, often being poorly equipped and poorly supplied, and animosity arose between soldiers and class-conscious officers; these contributed to low morale amongst Italian soldiers.

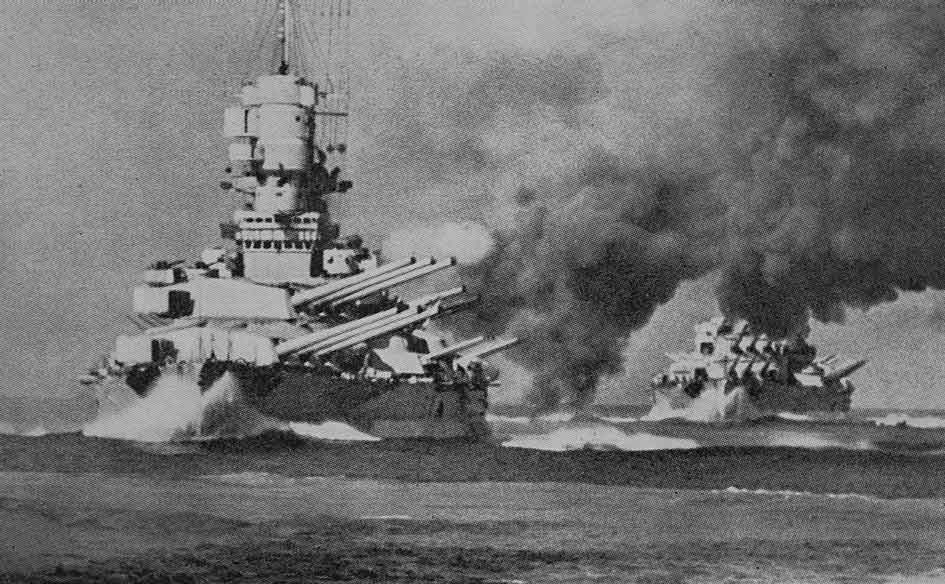
Italian battleships Vittorio Veneto and Littorio during the war

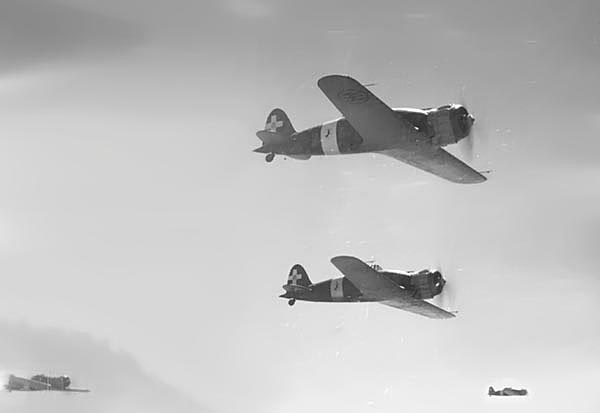
Italian Macchi C.200 fighter aircraft during the war

By early 1940, Italy was still a non-belligerent, and Mussolini communicated to Hitler that Italy was not prepared to intervene soon. By March 1940, Mussolini decided that Italy would intervene, but the date was not yet chosen. His senior military leadership unanimously opposed the action because Italy was unprepared. No raw materials had been stockpiled and the reserves it did have would soon be exhausted, Italy's industrial base was only one-tenth of Germany's, and even with supplies the Italian military was not organized to provide the equipment needed to fight a modern war of a long duration. An ambitious rearmament program was impossible because of Italy's limited reserves in gold and foreign currencies and lack of raw materials. Mussolini ignored the negative advice.

By 1941, Italy's attempts to run an autonomous campaign from Germany's, collapsed as a result of military setbacks in Greece, North Africa, and Eastern Africa; and the country became dependent and effectively subordinate to Germany. After the German-led invasion and occupation of Yugoslavia and Greece, that had both been targets of Italy's war aims, Italy was forced to accept German dominance in the two occupied countries. Furthermore, by 1941, German forces in North Africa under Erwin Rommel effectively took charge of the military effort ousting Allied forces from the Italian colony of Libya, and German forces were stationed in Sicily in that year. Germany's insolence towards Italy as an ally was demonstrated that year when Italy was pressured to send 350,000 "guest workers" to Germany who were used as forced labour. While Hitler was disappointed with the Italian military's performance, he maintained overall favorable relations with Italy because of his personal friendship with Mussolini.

On 25 July 1943, following the Allied invasion of Sicily, King Victor Emmanuel III dismissed Mussolini, placed him under arrest, and began secret negotiations with the Western Allies. An armistice was signed on 8 September 1943, and four days later Mussolini was rescued by the Germans in Operation Oak and placed in charge of a puppet state called the Italian Social Republic (Repubblica Sociale Italiana/RSI, or Repubblica di Salò) in northern Italy. In order to liberate the country from the Germans and Fascists, Italy became a co-belligerent of the Allies; as result, the country descended into the Italian Civil War, with the Italian Co-Belligerent Army and the partisans, supported by the Allies, contended the Social Republic's forces and its German allies. Some areas in Northern Italy were liberated from the Germans as late as May, 1945. Mussolini was killed by Communist partisans on 28 April 1945 while trying to escape to Switzerland.

==== Colonies and dependencies ====
===== In Europe =====
Every territory ever controlled by the Italian Empire at some point in time during World War II Kingdom of Italy Possessions/colonies of Italy Occupied territory and protectorates

The Dodecanese Islands were an Italian dependency known as the Italian Islands of the Aegean from 1912 to 1943.

Montenegro was an Italian dependency from 1941 to 1943 known as the Governorate of Montenegro that was under the control of an Italian military governor. Initially, the Italians intended that Montenegro would become an "independent" state closely allied with Italy, reinforced through the strong dynastic links between Italy and Montenegro, as Queen Elena of Italy was a daughter of the last Montenegrin king Nicholas I. The Italian-backed Montenegrin nationalist Sekula Drljević and his followers attempted to create a Montenegrin state. On 12 July 1941, they proclaimed the "Kingdom of Montenegro" under the protection of Italy. In less than 24 hours, that triggered a general uprising against the Italians. Within three weeks, the insurgents managed to capture almost all the territory of Montenegro. Over 70,000 Royal Italian Army troops and 20,000 of Albanian and Muslim irregulars were deployed to suppress the rebellion. Drljevic was expelled from Montenegro in October 1941. Montenegro then came under full direct Italian control. With the Italian capitulation of 1943, Montenegro came directly under the control of Germany.

Politically and economically dominated by Italy from its creation in 1913, Albania was occupied by Italian military forces in 1939 as the Albanian king Zog l fled the country with his family. The Albanian parliament voted to offer the Albanian throne to the King of Italy, resulting in a personal union between the two countries.

===== In Africa =====
Italian East Africa was an Italian colony existing from 1936 to 1943. Prior to the invasion and annexation of Ethiopia into this united colony in 1936, Italy had two colonies, Eritrea and Somalia since the 1880s.

Libya was an Italian colony existing from 1912 to 1943. The northern portion of Libya was incorporated directly into Italy in 1939; however the region remained united as a colony under a colonial governor.

=== Japan ===
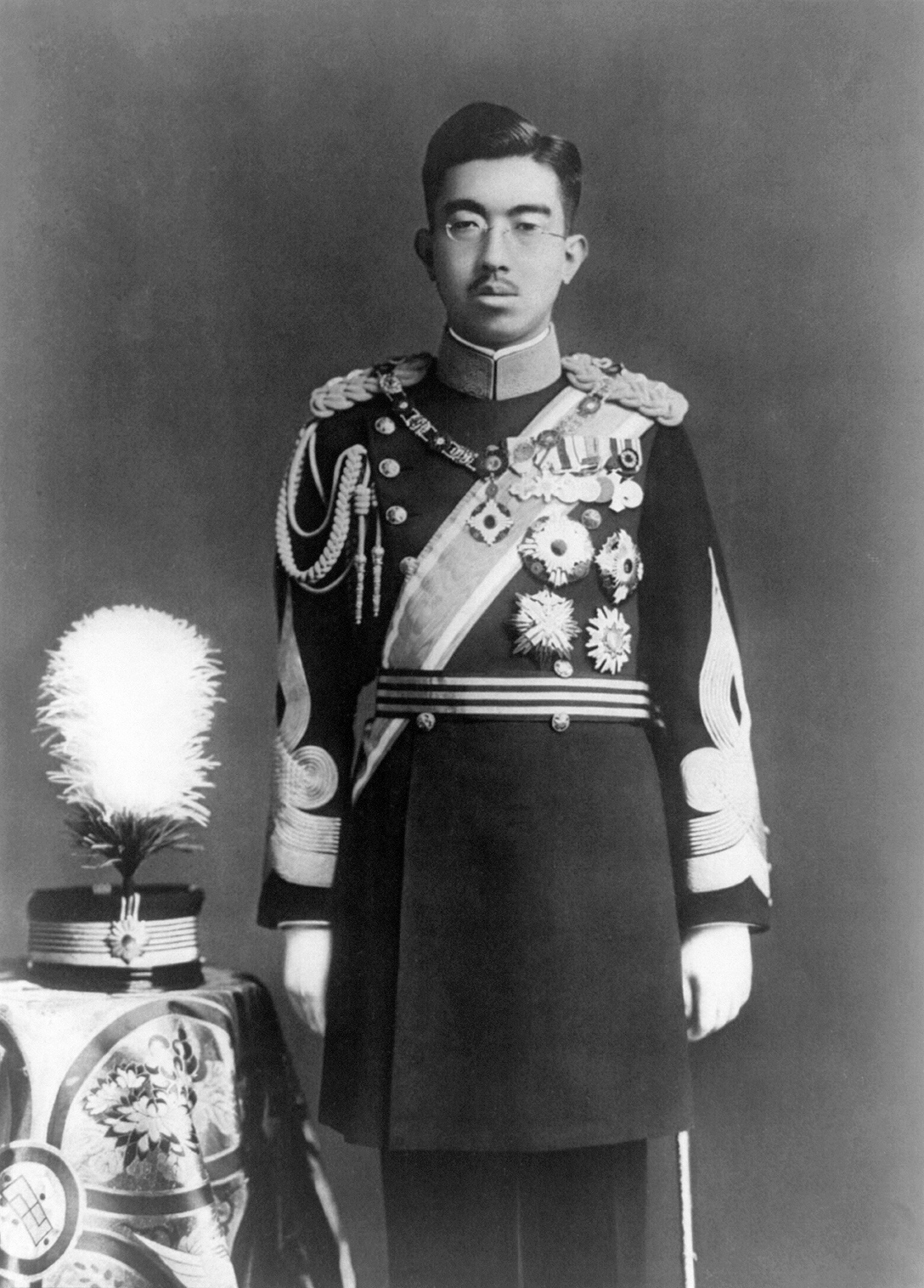
Hirohito, Emperor of Japan

==== War justifications ====
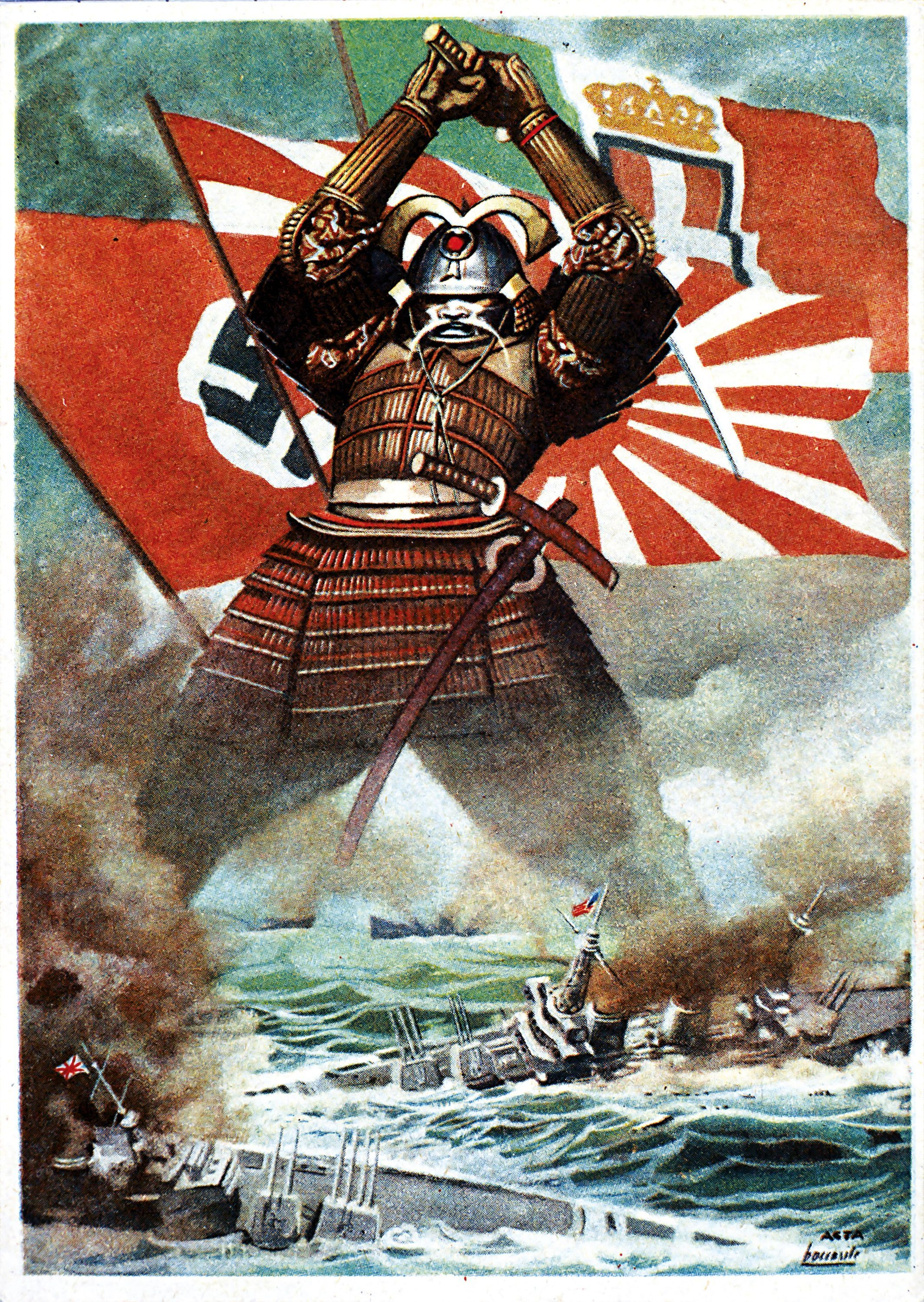
Italian propaganda poster by Gino Boccasile illustrating the strength of the Tripartite Pact, with samurai warrior sinking British and American ships, and the naval ensigns of the three powers flying behind him.

The Japanese government justified its actions by claiming that it was seeking to unite East Asia under Japanese leadership in a Greater East Asia Co-Prosperity Sphere that would free East Asians from domination and rule by clients of Western powers. Japan invoked themes of Pan-Asianism and said that the Asian people needed to be free from Western influence.

The United States opposed the Second Sino-Japanese War, and recognized Chiang Kai-Shek's Nationalist Government as the legitimate government of China. As a result, the United States sought to bring the Japanese war effort to a halt by imposing an embargo on all trade between the United States and Japan. Japan was dependent on the United States for 80 percent of its petroleum, and as a consequence the embargo resulted in an economic and military crisis for Japan, as Japan could not continue its war effort against China without access to petroleum.

In order to maintain its military campaign in China with the major loss of petroleum trade with the United States, Japan saw the best means to secure an alternative source of petroleum in the petroleum-rich and natural-resources-rich Southeast Asia. This threat of retaliation by Japan to the total trade embargo by the United States was known by the American government, including American Secretary of State Cordell Hull who was negotiating with the Japanese to avoid a war, fearing that the total embargo would pre-empt a Japanese attack on the Dutch East Indies.

Japan identified the United States Pacific Fleet based in Pearl Harbor Naval Base as the principal threat to its designs to invade and capture Southeast Asia. Thus Japan initiated the attack on Pearl Harbor on 7 December 1941 as a means to inhibit an American response to the invasion of Southeast Asia, and buy time to allow Japan to consolidate itself with these resources to engage in a total war against the United States, and force the United States to accept Japan's acquisitions. On 7 December 1941 Japan declared war on the United States and the British Empire.

==== History ====
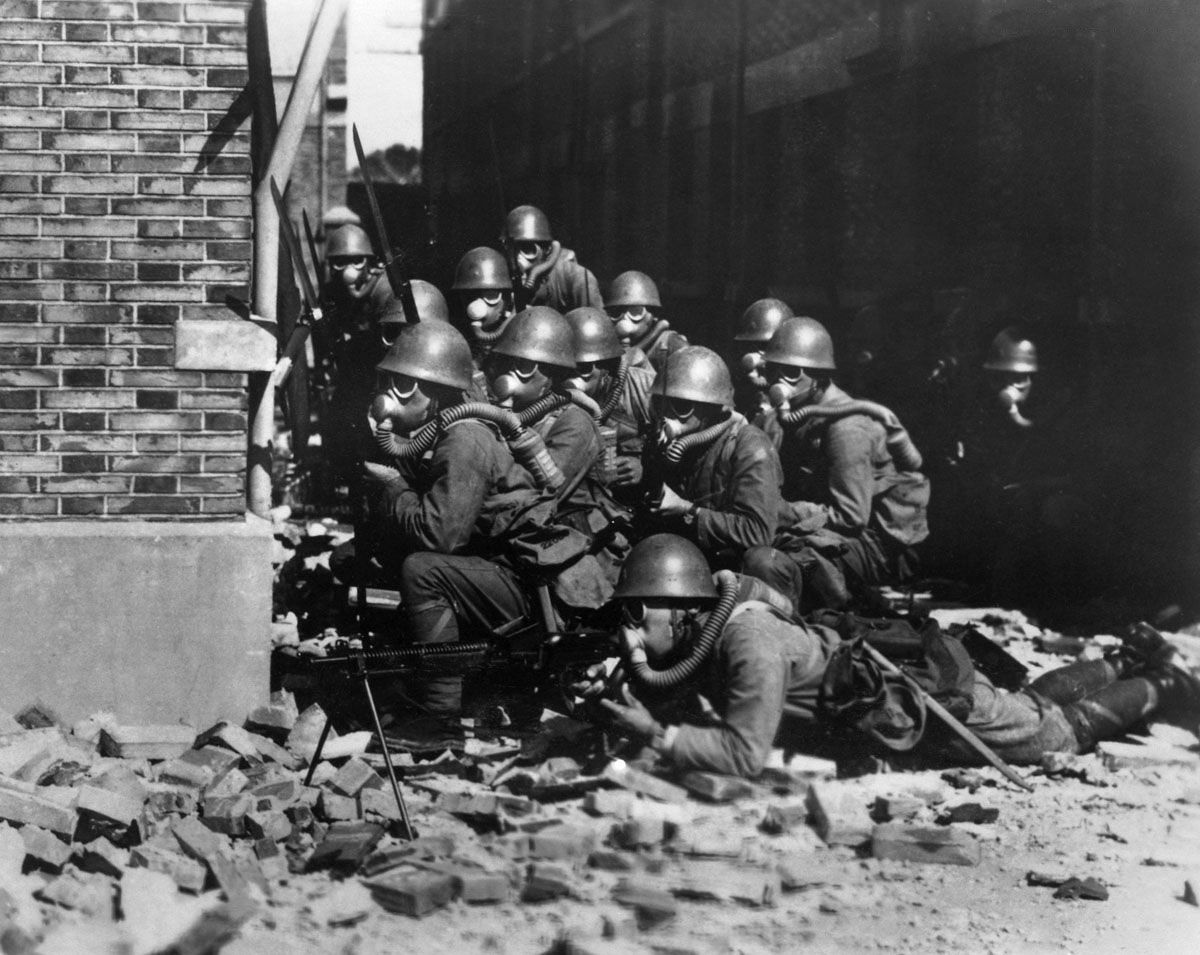
IJN Special Naval Landing Forces armed with the Type 11 Light Machine Gun during the Battle of Shanghai

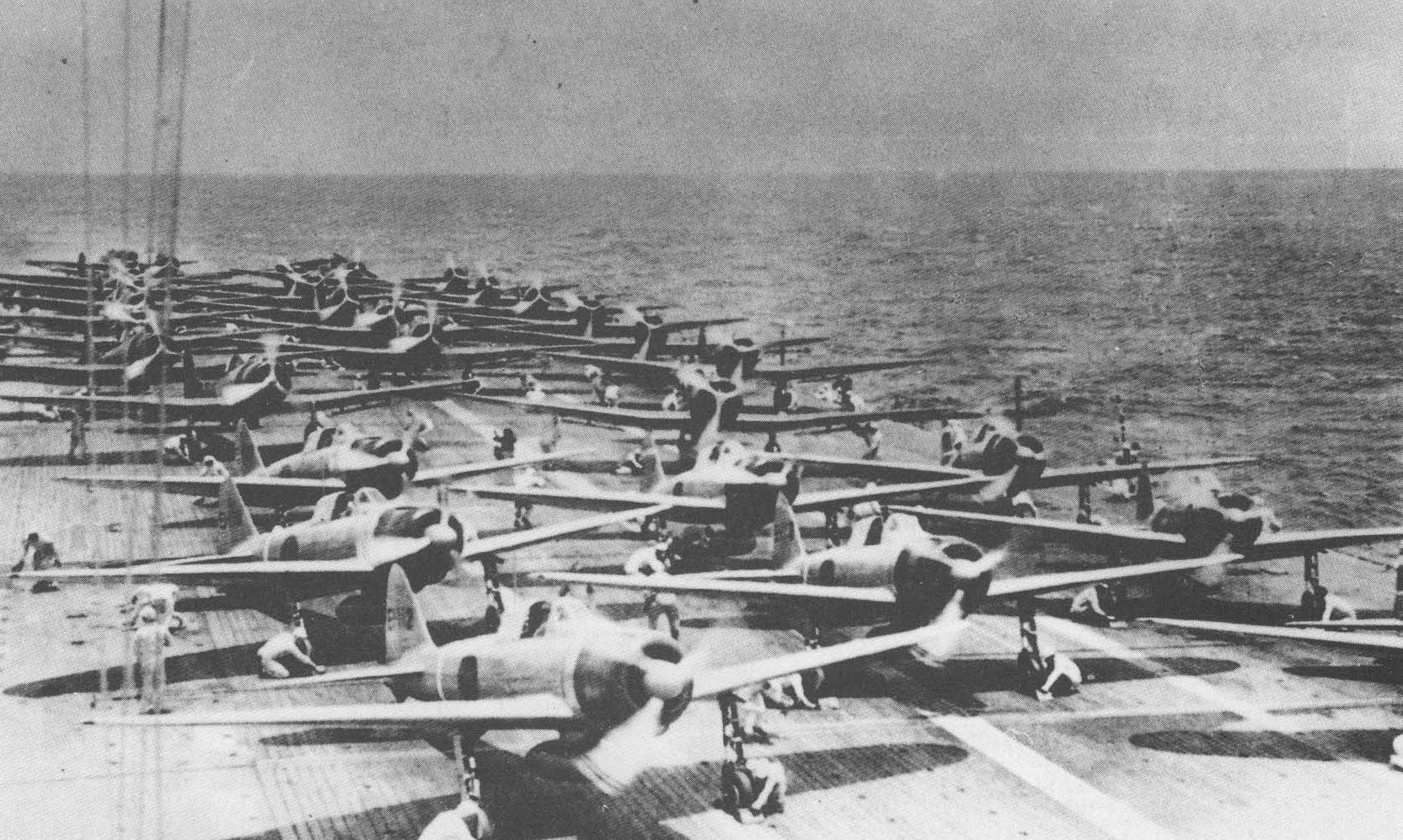
Mitsubishi A6M Zero fighter aircraft and other aircraft preparing for takeoff on the aircraft carrier Shōkaku on 7 December 1941, for the attack on Pearl Harbor

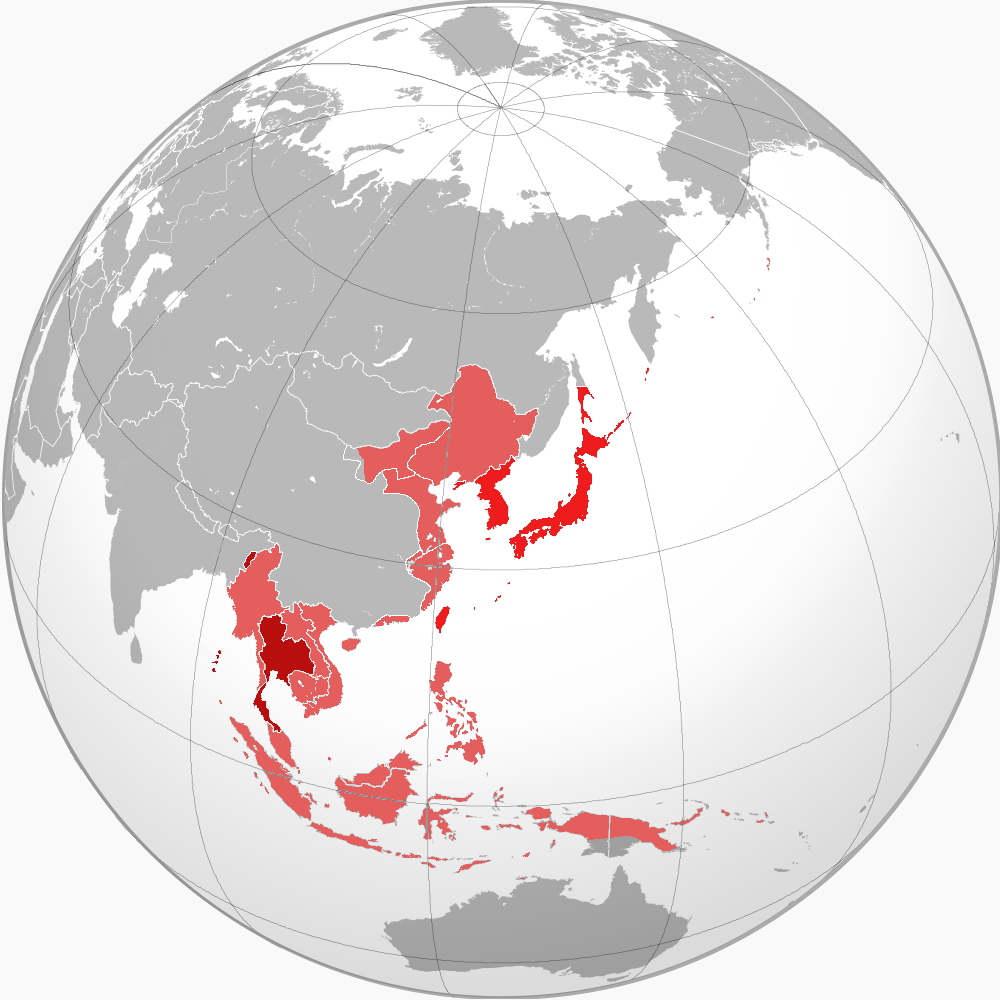
Empire of Japan Japanese puppet states Thailand (cooperated with Japan) All are members of the Greater East Asia Co-Prosperity Sphere.

The Empire of Japan, a constitutional monarchy with Hirohito as its Emperor, was the principal Axis power in Asia and the Pacific. Under the emperor were a political cabinet and the Imperial General Headquarters, with two chiefs of staff. By 1945 the Emperor of Japan was more than a symbolic leader; he played a major role in devising a strategy to keep himself on the throne.

At its peak, Japan's Greater East Asia Co-Prosperity Sphere included Manchuria, Inner Mongolia, large parts of China, Malaysia, French Indochina, the Dutch East Indies, the Philippines, Burma, a small part of India, and various Pacific Islands in the central Pacific.

As a result of the internal discord and economic downturn of the 1920s, militaristic elements set Japan on a path of expansionism. As the Japanese home islands lacked natural resources needed for growth, Japan planned to establish hegemony in Asia and become self-sufficient by acquiring territories with abundant natural resources. Japan's expansionist policies alienated it from other countries in the League of Nations and by the mid-1930s brought it closer to Germany and Italy, who had both pursued similar expansionist policies. Cooperation between Japan and Germany began with the Anti-Comintern Pact, in which the two countries agreed to ally to challenge any attack by the Soviet Union.

Japan entered into conflict against the Chinese in 1937. The Japanese invasion and occupation of parts of China resulted in numerous atrocities against civilians, such as the Nanjing Massacre and the Three Alls Policy. The Japanese also fought skirmishes with Soviet–Mongolian forces in Manchukuo in 1938 and 1939. Japan sought to avoid war with the Soviet Union by signing a non-aggression pact with it in 1941.

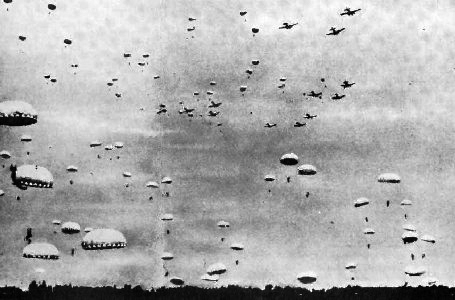
IJA paratroopers are landing during the Battle of Palembang, February 13, 1942.

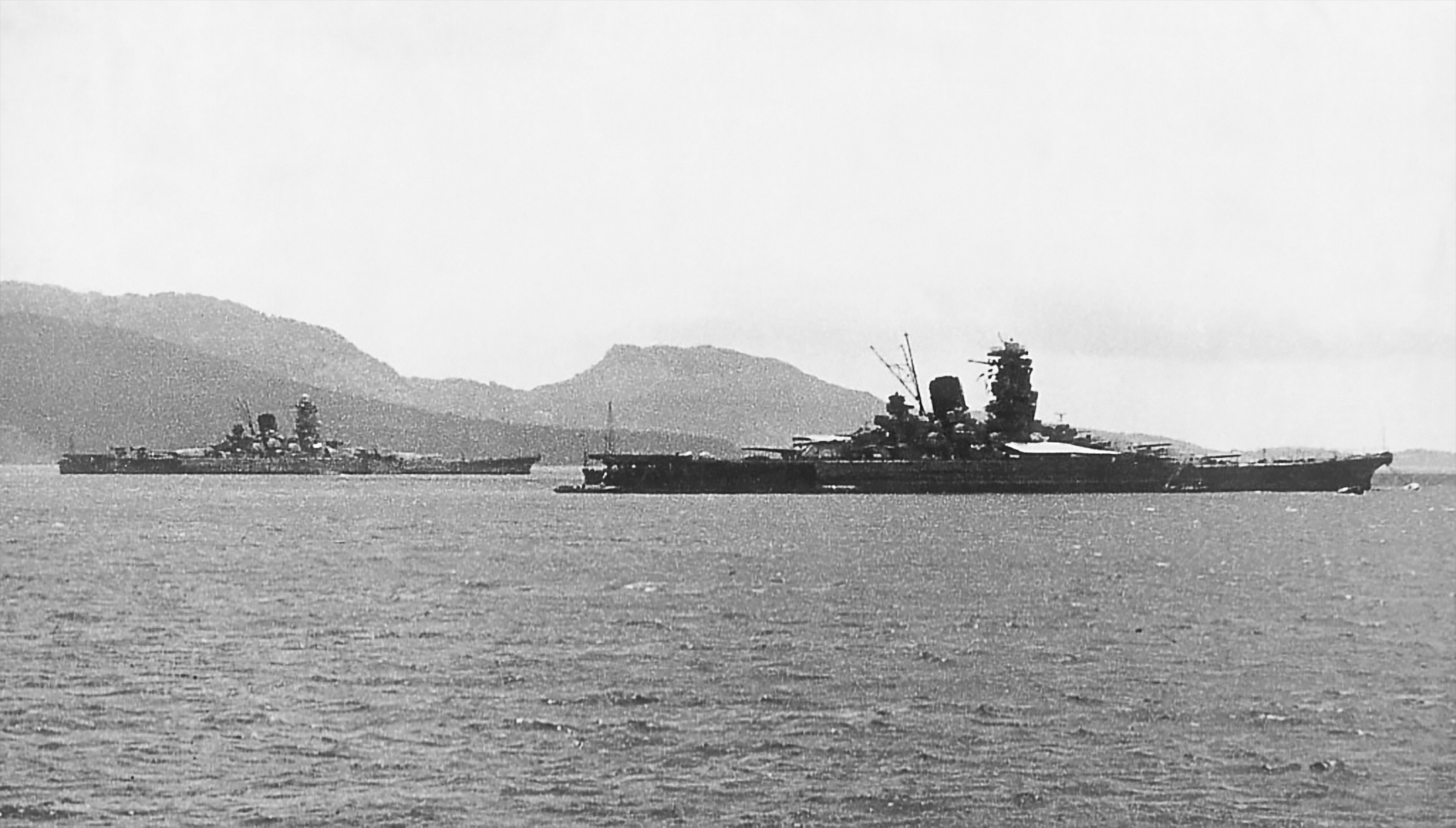
IJN Yamato-class Battleships Yamato and Musashi moored in Truk Lagoon, in 1943

Japan's military leaders were divided on diplomatic relationships with Germany and Italy and the attitude towards the United States. The Imperial Japanese Army was in favour of war with the United States, but the Imperial Japanese Navy was generally strongly opposed. When Prime Minister of Japan General Hideki Tojo refused American demands that Japan withdraw its military forces from China, a confrontation became more likely. War with the United States was being discussed within the Japanese government by 1940. Commander of the Combined Fleet Admiral Isoroku Yamamoto was outspoken in his opposition, especially after the signing of the Tripartite Pact, saying on 14 October 1940: "To fight the United States is like fighting the whole world. But it has been decided. So I will fight the best I can. Doubtless I shall die on board Nagato [his flagship]. Meanwhile, Tokyo will be burnt to the ground three times. Konoe and others will be torn to pieces by the revengeful people, I [shouldn't] wonder. " In October and November 1940, Yamamoto communicated with Navy Minister Oikawa, and stated, "Unlike the pre-Tripartite days, great determination is required to make certain that we avoid the danger of going to war. "

With the European powers focused on the war in Europe, Japan sought to acquire their colonies. In 1940 Japan responded to the German invasion of France by occupying northern French Indochina. The Vichy France regime, a de facto ally of Germany, accepted the takeover. The allied forces did not respond with war. However, the United States instituted an embargo against Japan in 1941 because of the continuing war in China. This cut off Japan's supply of scrap metal and oil needed for industry, trade, and the war effort.

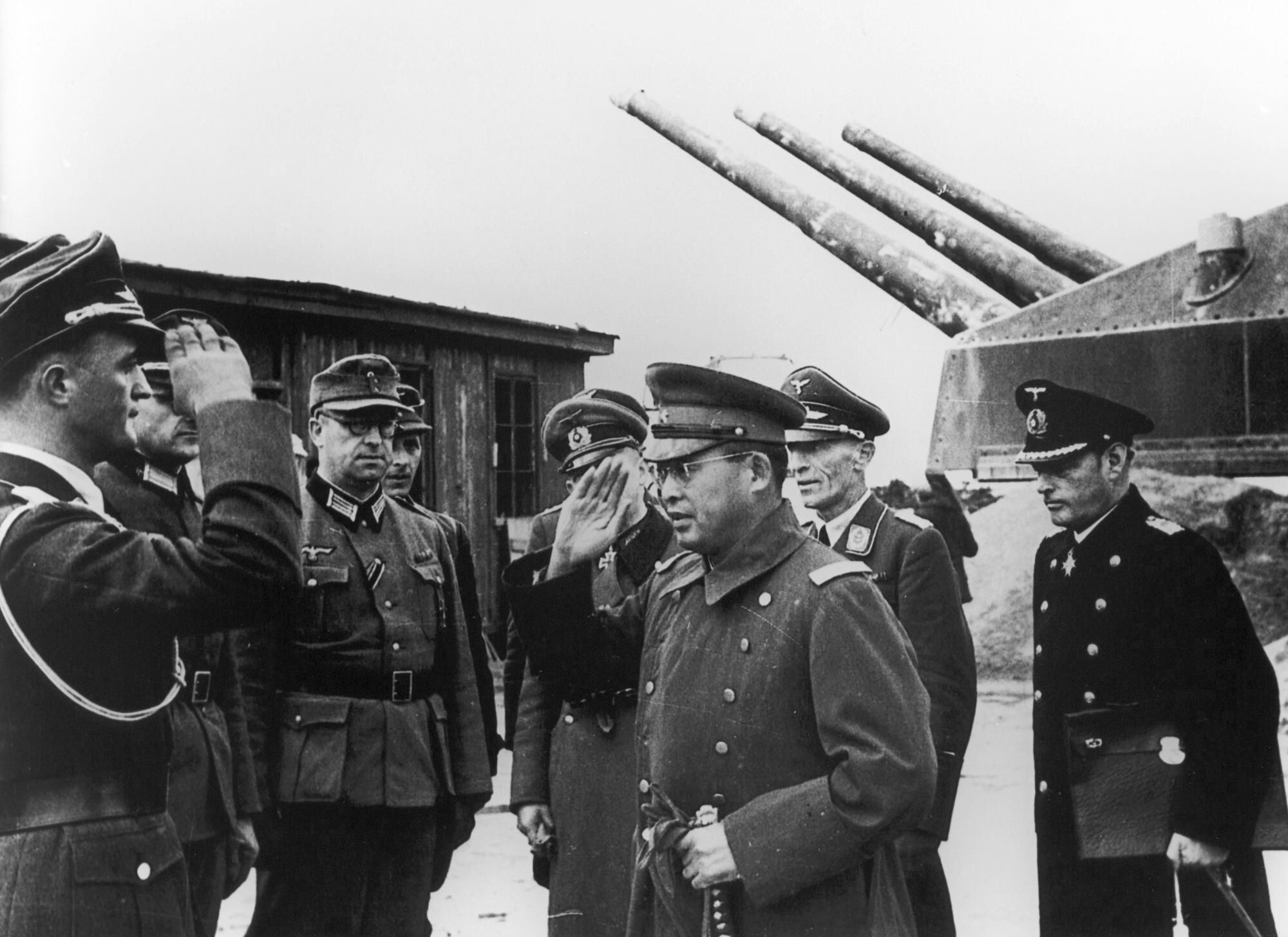
Japanese Military Attaché, Makoto Onodera, visiting Fjell Fortress in Norway, 1943. Behind him is Lieutenant Colonel Eberhard Freiherr von Zedlitz und Neukrich (C-in-C Luftwaffe Feldregiment 502.), and to the right is Fregattenkapitän doktor Robert Morath (Seekommandant in Bergen). Behind Onoderas hand (raised in salute) is General Nikolaus von Falkenhorst (C-in-C German military forces in Norway).

To isolate the US forces stationed in the Philippines and to reduce US naval power, the Imperial General Headquarters ordered an attack on the US naval base at Pearl Harbor, Hawaii, on 7 December 1941. They also invaded Malaya and Hong Kong. Initially achieving a series of victories, by 1943 the Japanese forces were driven back towards the home islands. The Pacific War lasted until the atomic bombings of Hiroshima and Nagasaki in 1945. The Soviets formally declared war in August 1945 and engaged Japanese forces in Manchuria and northeast China.

==== Colonies and dependencies ====
Taiwan was a Japanese dependency established in 1895. Korea was a Japanese protectorate and dependency formally established by the Japan–Korea Treaty of 1910.

The South Seas Mandate were territories granted to Japan in 1919 in the peace agreements of World War I, that designated to Japan the German South Pacific islands. Japan received these as a reward by the Allies of World War I, when Japan was then allied against Germany.

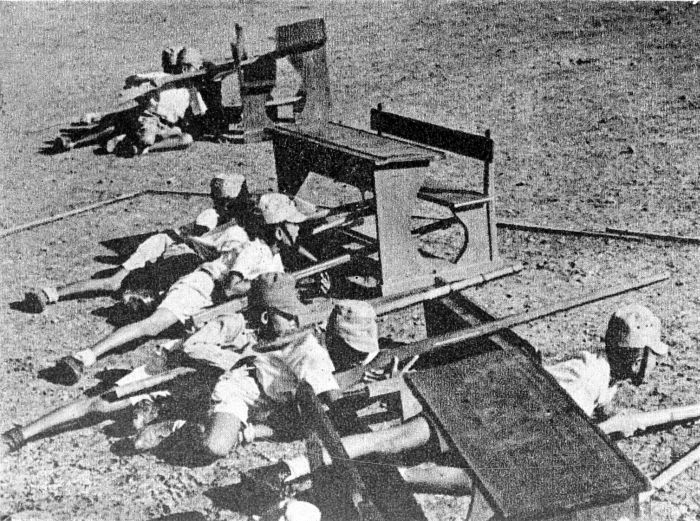
Japanese officers training young Indonesian recruits, c. 1945

Japan occupied the Dutch East Indies during the war. Japan planned to transform these territories into a client state of Indonesia and sought alliance with Indonesian nationalists including future Indonesian President Sukarno, however these efforts did not deliver the creation of an Indonesian state until after Japan's surrender.

== Other Tripartite Pact signatories ==
In addition to the three major Axis powers, six other countries signed the Tripartite Pact as its member states. Of the additional countries, Hungary, Slovakia, Bulgaria, the Independent State of Croatia, and Romania participated in various Axis military operations with their national armed forces, while the sixth, Yugoslavia, saw its Tripartite signatory government overthrown earlier in a coup merely days after it signed the Pact, and the membership was reversed.

=== Hungary ===
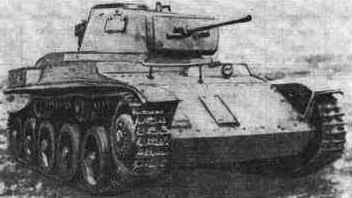
Hungarian Toldi I tank as used during the 1941 Axis invasion of the Soviet Union

The Kingdom of Hungary, ruled by Regent Admiral Miklós Horthy, was the first country apart from Germany, Italy, and Japan to adhere to the Tripartite Pact, signing the agreement on 20 November 1940.

Political instability plagued the country until Miklós Horthy, a Hungarian nobleman and Austro-Hungarian naval officer, became regent in 1920. The vast majority of the Hungarians desired to recover former territories of the Lands of the Crown of Saint Stephen lost through the Treaty of Trianon. During the government of Gyula Gömbös, Hungary drew closer to Germany and Italy largely because of a shared desire to revise the peace settlements made after World War I. Many people sympathized with the antisemitic policy of the Nazi regime. Hungary refused to participate in Nazi Germany's planned invasion of Czechoslovakia during the Sudeten Crisis, but after the Munich Agreement carried out a diplomatic rapprochement in order to avoid Germany developing too close of an alliance with Hungary's rival Romania. Due to its supportive stance towards Germany and the new efforts in the international policy, Hungary gained favourable territorial settlements by the First Vienna Award, after the breakup of Czechoslovakia occupied and annexed the remainder of Carpathian Ruthenia and in 1940 received Northern Transylvania from Romania via the Second Vienna Award. Hungarians permitted German troops to transit through their territory during the invasion of Yugoslavia, and Hungarian forces joined the military operations after the proclamation of the Independent State of Croatia. Parts of the former Yugoslavia were annexed to Hungary; the United Kingdom immediately broke off diplomatic relations in response.

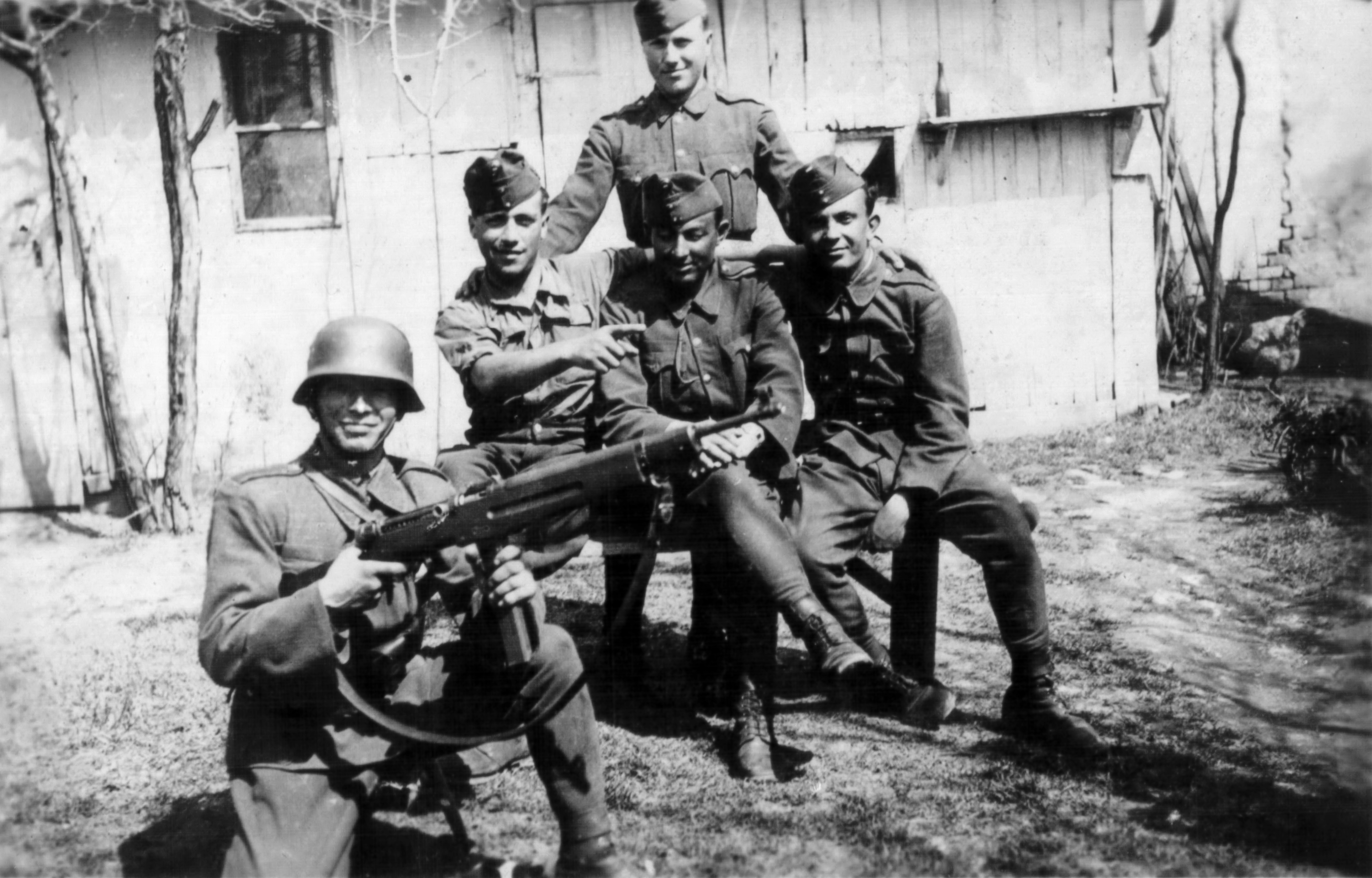
Hungarian soldiers in the Carpathian mountains in 1944

Although Hungary did not initially participate in the German invasion of the Soviet Union, Hungary and the Soviet Union became belligerents on 27 June 1941. Over 500,000 soldiers served on the Eastern Front. All five of Hungary's field armies ultimately participated in the war against the Soviet Union; a significant contribution was made by the Hungarian Second Army.

On 25 November 1941, Hungary was one of thirteen signatories to the renewed Anti-Comintern Pact. Hungarian troops, like their Axis counterparts, were involved in numerous actions against the Soviets. By the end of 1943, the Soviets had gained the upper hand and the Germans were retreating. The Hungarian Second Army was destroyed in fighting on the Voronezh Front, on the banks of the Don River.

Prior to the German occupation within the area of Hungary around 63,000 Jews perished. Afterwards, in late 1944, 437,000 Jews were deported to Auschwitz-Birkenau, most of them to their deaths. Overall, Hungarian Jews suffered close to 560,000 casualties.

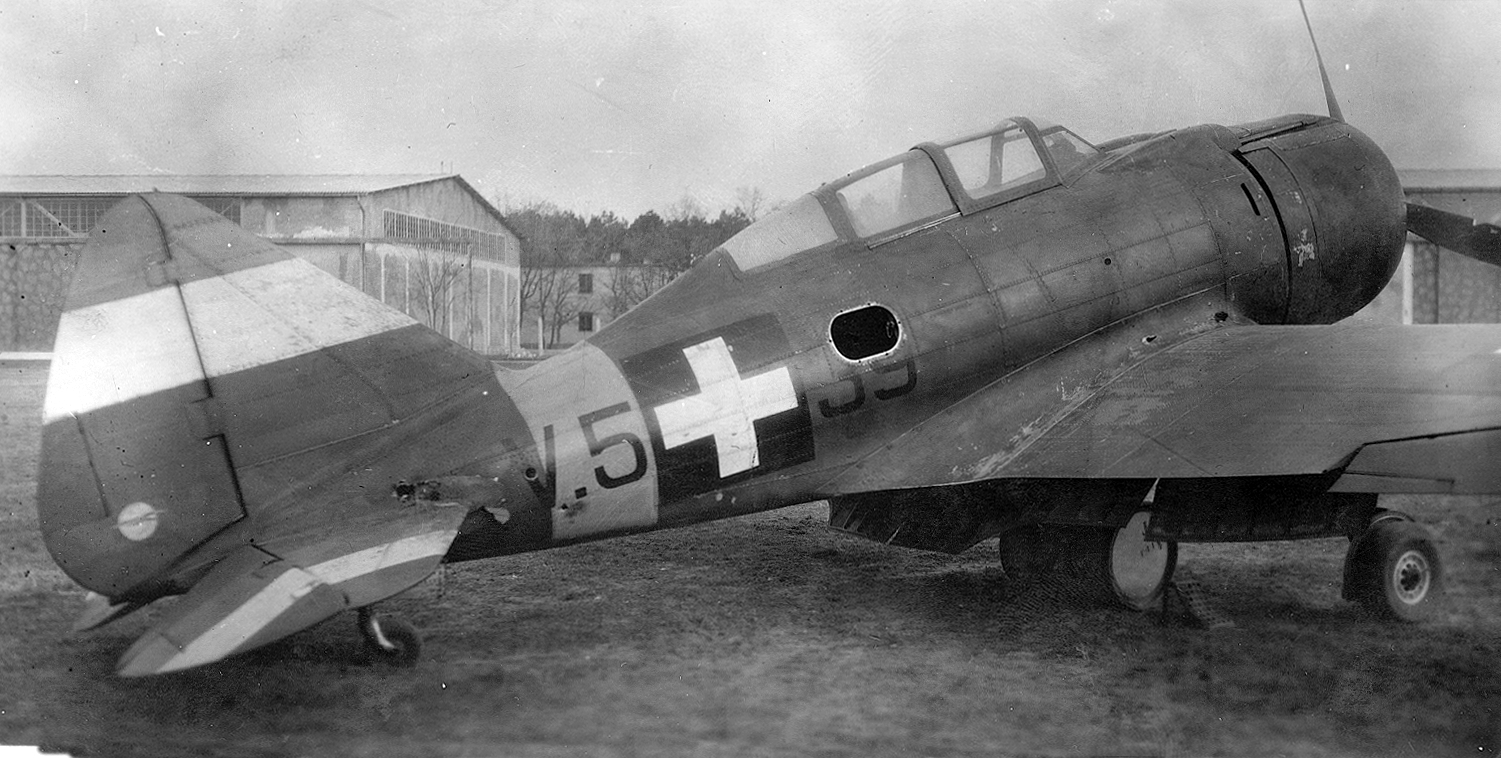
MÁVAG Héja fighter aircraft, derived from the Reggiane Re.2000, an Italian fighter design

Relations between Germany and the regency of Miklós Horthy collapsed in 1944 when Horthy attempted to negotiate a peace agreement with the Soviets and jump out of the war without German approval. Horthy was forced to abdicate after German commandos, led by Colonel Otto Skorzeny, held his son hostage as part of Operation Panzerfaust. Hungary was reorganized following Horthy's abdication in December 1944 into a totalitarian regime called the Government of National Unity, led by Ferenc Szálasi. He had been Prime Minister of Hungary since October 1944 and was leader of the Hungarist Arrow Cross Party. Its jurisdiction was effectively limited to an ever-narrowing band of territory in central Hungary, around Budapest since by the time they took power the Red Army was already far inside the country. Nonetheless, the Arrow Cross rule, short-lived as it was, was brutal. In fewer than three months, Arrow Cross death squads killed as many as 38,000 Hungarian Jews. Arrow Cross officers helped Adolf Eichmann re-activate the deportation proceedings from which the Jews of Budapest had thus far been spared, sending some 80,000 Jews out of the city on slave labour details and many more straight to death camps. Most of them died, including many who were murdered outright after the end of the fighting as they were returning home. Days after the Szálasi government took power, the capital of Budapest was surrounded by the Soviet Red Army. German and Hungarian forces tried to hold off the Soviet advance but failed. After fierce fighting, Budapest was taken by the Soviets. A number of pro-German Hungarians retreated to Italy and Germany, where they fought until the end of the war.

In March 1945, Szálasi fled to Germany as the leader of a government in exile, until the surrender of Germany in May 1945.

=== Romania ===
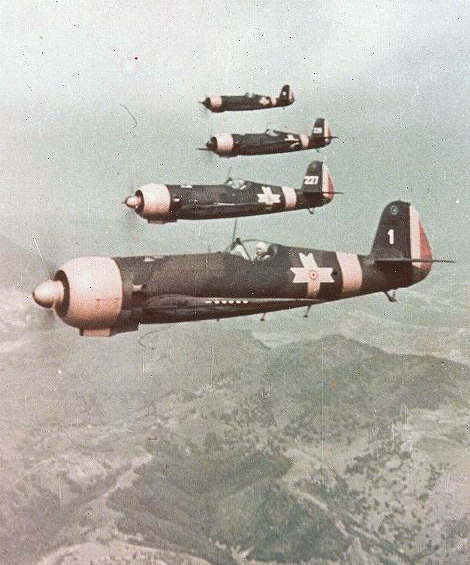
A formation of Romanian IAR 80 fighter aircraft

With the exception of Germany and Italy, Romania was the only country where a Fascist movement came to power without foreign assistance. When war erupted in Europe, the economy of the Kingdom of Romania was already subordinated to the interests of Nazi Germany through a treaty signed in the spring of 1939. Nevertheless, the country had not totally abandoned pro-British sympathies. Romania had also been allied to the Poles for most of the interwar era. Following the invasion of Poland by Germany and the Soviet Union, and the German conquest of France and the Low Countries, Romania found itself increasingly isolated; meanwhile, pro-German and pro-Fascist elements began to grow.

The August 1939 Molotov–Ribbentrop Pact between Germany and the Soviet Union contained a secret protocol ceding Bessarabia, and Northern Bukovina to the Soviet Union. On June 28, 1940, the Soviet Union occupied and annexed Bessarabia, as well as part of northern Romania and the Hertsa region. On 30 August 1940, as a result of the German–Italian arbitrated Second Vienna Award Romania had to cede Northern Transylvania to Hungary. Southern Dobruja was ceded to Bulgaria in September 1940. In an effort to appease the Fascist elements within the country and obtain German protection, King Carol II appointed the General Ion Antonescu as Prime Minister on September 6, 1940.

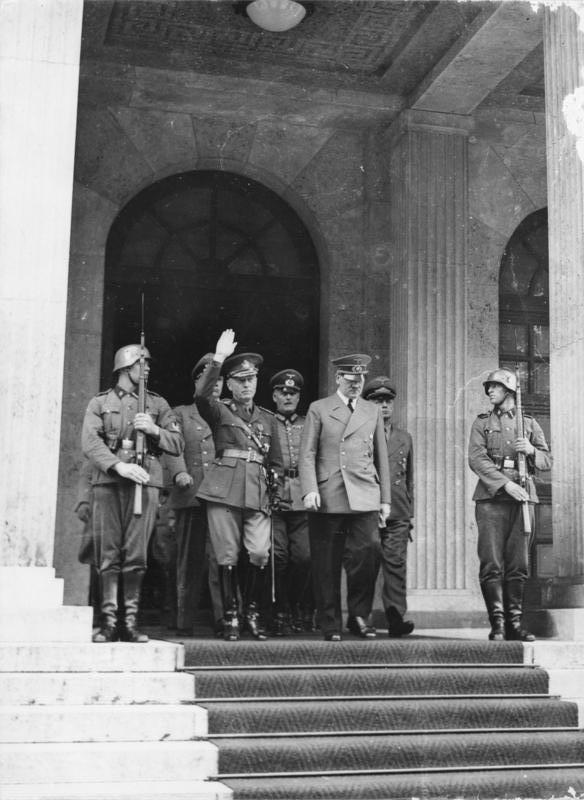
Ion Antonescu and Adolf Hitler at the Führerbau in Munich (June 1941)

Two days later, Antonescu forced the king to abdicate and installed the king's young son Michael (Mihai) on the throne, then declared himself Conducător ("Leader") with dictatorial powers. The National Legionary State was proclaimed on 14 September, with the Iron Guard ruling together with Antonescu as the sole legal political movement in Romania. Under King Michael I and the military government of Antonescu, Romania signed the Tripartite Pact on November 23, 1940. German troops entered the country on 10 October 1941, officially to train the Romanian Army. Hitler's directive to the troops on 10 October had stated that "it is necessary to avoid even the slightest semblance of military occupation of Romania". The entrance of German troops in Romania determined Italian dictator Benito Mussolini to launch an invasion of Greece, starting the Greco-Italian War. Having secured Hitler's approval in January 1941, Antonescu ousted the Iron Guard from power.

Romania was subsequently used as a platform for invasions of Yugoslavia and the Soviet Union. Despite not being involved militarily in the Invasion of Yugoslavia, Romania requested that Hungarian troops not operate in the Banat. Paulus thus modified the Hungarian plan and kept their troops west of the Tisza.

Romania joined the German-led invasion of the Soviet Union on June 22, 1941. Antonescu was the only foreign leader Hitler consulted on military matters and the two would meet no less than ten times throughout the war. Romania re-captured Bessarabia and Northern Bukovina during Operation Munchen before conquering further Soviet territory and establishing the Transnistria Governorate. After the Siege of Odessa, the city became the capital of the Governorate. Romanian troops fought their way into the Crimea alongside German troops and contributed significantly to the Siege of Sevastopol. Later, Romanian mountain troops joined the German campaign in the Caucasus, reaching as far as Nalchik. After suffering devastating losses at Stalingrad, Romanian officials began secretly negotiating peace conditions with the Allies.

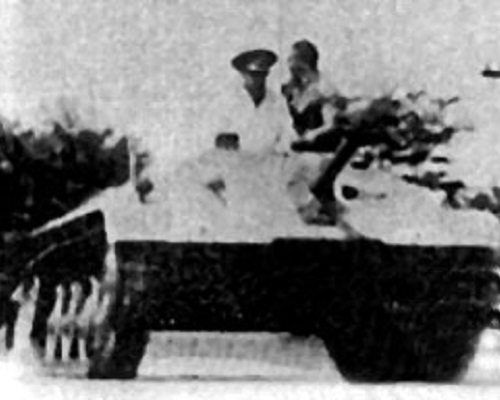
The Romanian Mareșal tank destroyer's design was likely used by the Germans to develop the Hetzer.

Romania's military industry was small but versatile, able to copy and produce thousands of French, Soviet, German, British, and Czechoslovak weapons systems, as well as producing capable original products. The Romanian Navy also built sizable warships, such as the minelayer NMS Amiral Murgescu and the submarines NMS Rechinul and NMS Marsuinul. Hundreds of originally-designed Romanian Air Force aircraft were also produced, such as the fighter IAR-80 and the light bomber IAR-37. The country had built armored fighting vehicles as well, most notably the Mareșal tank destroyer, that likely influenced the design of the German Hetzer. Romania had also been a major power in the oil industry since the 1800s. It was one of the largest producers in Europe and the Ploiești oil refineries provided about 30% of all Axis oil production. British historian Dennis Deletant has asserted that Romania's crucial contributions to the Axis war effort, including having the third largest Axis army in Europe and sustaining the German war effort through oil and other materiel, meant that it was "on a par with Italy as a principal ally of Germany and not in the category of a minor Axis satellite". Another British historian, Mark Axworthy, believes that Romania could even be considered to have had the second most important Axis army of Europe, even more so than that of Italy.

Under Antonescu Romania was a fascist dictatorship and a totalitarian state. Between 45,000 and 60,000 Jews were killed in Bukovina and Bessarabia by Romanian and German troops in 1941. According to Wilhelm Filderman at least 150,000 Jews of Bessarabia and Bukovina, died under the Antonescu regime (both those deported and those who remained). Overall, approximately 250,000 Jews under Romanian jurisdiction died.

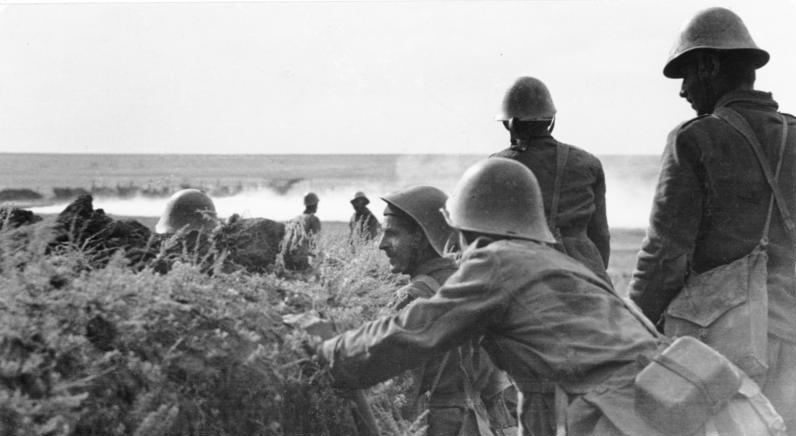
Romanian soldiers on the outskirts of Stalingrad during the Battle of Stalingrad in 1942

By 1943, the tide began to turn. The Soviets pushed further west, retaking Ukraine and eventually launching an unsuccessful invasion of eastern Romania in the spring of 1944. Romanian troops in the Crimea helped repulse initial Soviet landings, but eventually all of the peninsula was re-conquered by Soviet forces and the Romanian Navy evacuated over 100,000 German and Romanian troops, an achievement which earned Romanian Admiral Horia Macellariu the Knight's Cross of the Iron Cross. During the Jassy-Kishinev Offensive of August 1944, Romania switched sides on August 23, 1944. Romanian troops then fought alongside the Soviet Army until the end of the war, reaching as far as Czechoslovakia and Austria.

After the September 1943 Armistice of Cassibile with Italy, Romania became the second Axis power in Europe. The Romanians shared in the spoils of Operation Achse, Regia Marina's 5 CB-class midget submarines in the Black Sea being transferred to the Romanian Navy. Romania also captured 496 Italians, mostly naval personnel (2 of them later died). Before the month was out, Germany had agreed to systematically supply the Romanian Army with German military vehicles, via the Olivenbaum I-III and Quittenbaum I programs. Deliveries started in November 1943, and by August 1944, Germany had supplied Romania with 10 times more armored vehicles (Panzer III, Panzer IV and Sturmgeschütz III) than during the entire pre-Cassibile period. Having acquired the license to produce the Messerschmitt Bf 109, Romania planned to assemble 75 from German parts. Deliveries began in May 1944, but only 6 were completed before Romania left the Axis in August 1944. Eleven more were completed by the end of the war with the remaining 58 completed after the war. In 1944, Romania had also gained access to certain Wunderwaffen, such as the Werfer-Granate 21. The first Romanian-made Fiesler Storch was completed in October 1943, followed by 9 more by May 1944. From March 1944, Germany also contributed to the design and construction of the M-05 and M-06 prototypes of the Mareșal tank destroyer: Alkett contributed to the Romanian design team and Telefunken radios along with Böhler armor were provided. The 75 mm Reșița gun (production started at the end of 1943) used the projectile chamber of the German Pak 40. Technology transfers between the two countries were not necessarily one-way, however. On 6 January 1944, Antonescu showed Hitler the plans of the M-04 prototype of the Mareșal tank destroyer. In May 1944, Lieutenant-Colonel Ventz from the Waffenamt acknowledged that the Hetzer had followed the Romanian design. German-led Army Group South Ukraine could not take major operational decisions without securing Ion Antonescu's approval, even as late as 22 August 1944 (the day before he was dismissed). An entire German army (the 6th) came under Romanian command in May 1944, when it became part of Romanian general Petre Dumitrescu's Armeegruppe. For the first time in the war, German commanders came under the actual (rather than nominal) command of their foreign allies. This Romanian-led army group had 24 divisions of which 17 were German.

=== Slovakia ===
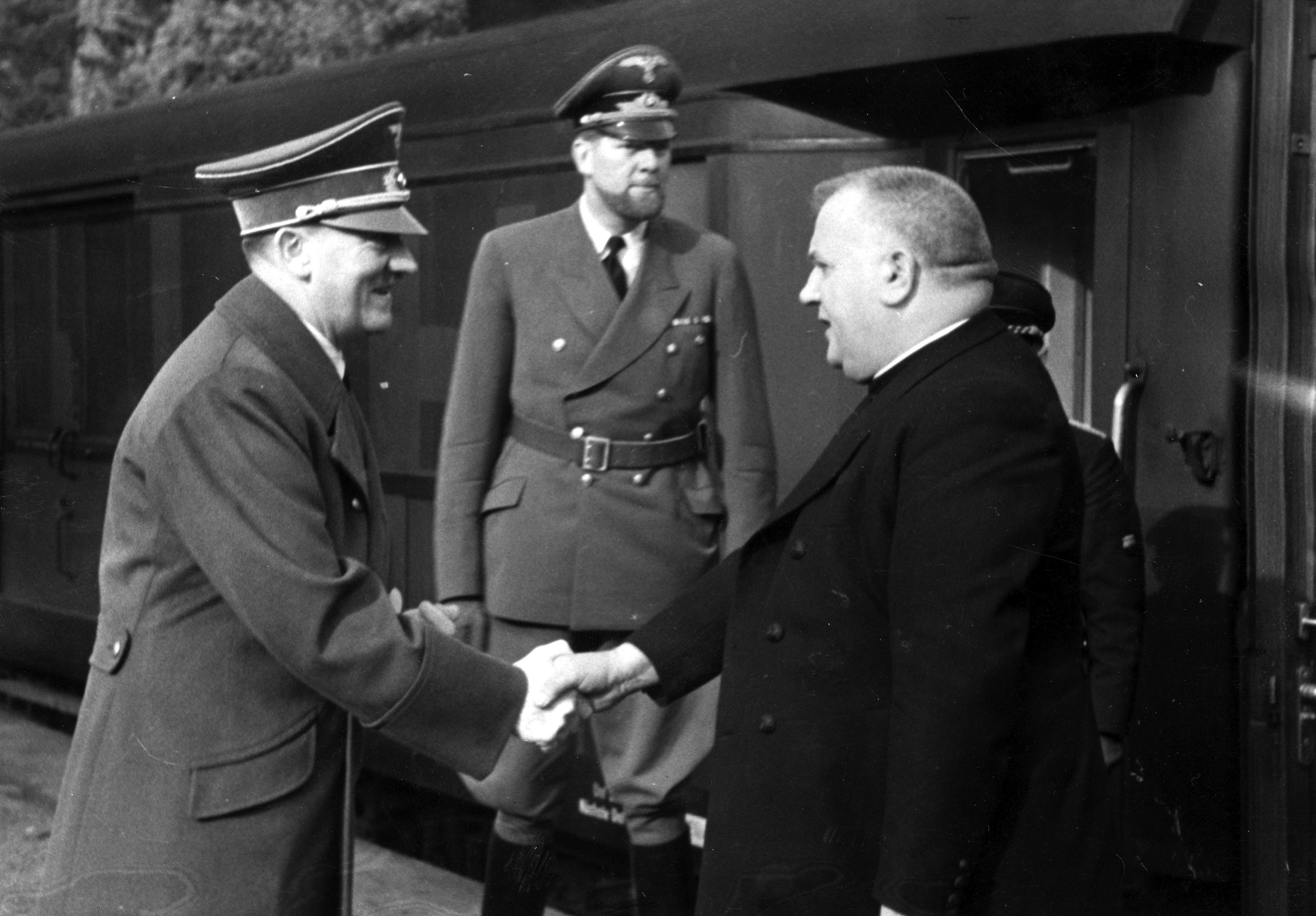
Adolf Hitler greeting Jozef Tiso, president of the Slovak Republic, 1941

The Slovak Republic under President Jozef Tiso signed the Tripartite Pact on 24 November 1940.

Slovakia had been closely aligned with Germany almost immediately from its declaration of independence from Czechoslovakia on 14 March 1939. Slovakia entered into a treaty of protection with Germany on 23 March 1939.

Slovak troops joined the German invasion of Poland, having interest in Spiš and Orava. Those two regions, along with Cieszyn Silesia, had been disputed between Poland and Czechoslovakia since 1918. The Poles fully annexed them following the Munich Agreement. After the invasion of Poland, Slovakia reclaimed control of those territories. Slovakia invaded Poland alongside German forces, contributing 50,000 men at this stage of the war.

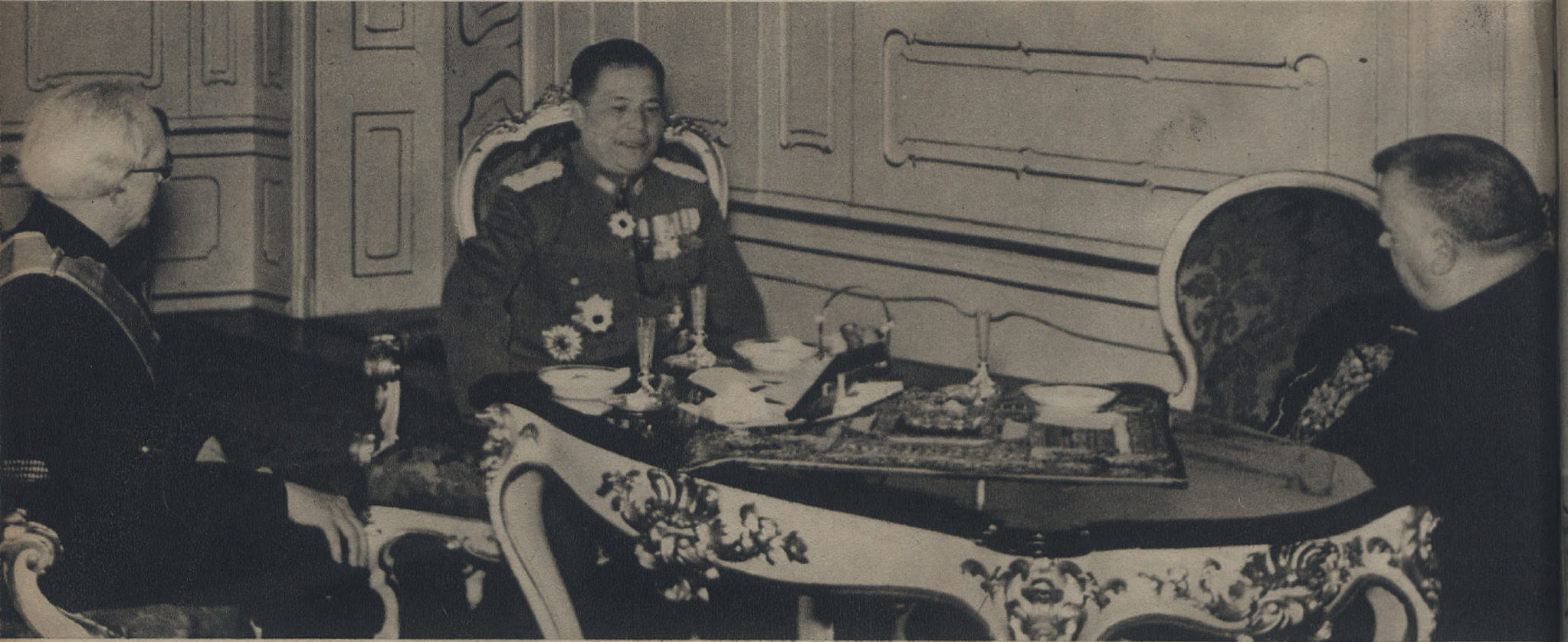
Hiroshi Ōshima, Japanese envoy to Slovak Republic and Ambassador to Germany with Slovak president Jozef Tiso and Slovak prime minister Vojtech Tuka, 1941

Slovakia declared war on the Soviet Union in 1941 and signed the revived Anti-Comintern Pact in 1941. Slovak troops fought on Germany's Eastern Front, furnishing Germany with two divisions totaling 80,000 men. Slovakia declared war on the United Kingdom and the United States in 1942.

Slovakia was spared German military occupation until the Slovak National Uprising, which began on 29 August 1944, and was almost immediately crushed by the Waffen SS and Slovak troops loyal to Josef Tiso.

After the war, Tiso was executed and Slovakia once again became part of Czechoslovakia. The border with Poland was shifted back to the pre-war state.

=== Bulgaria ===
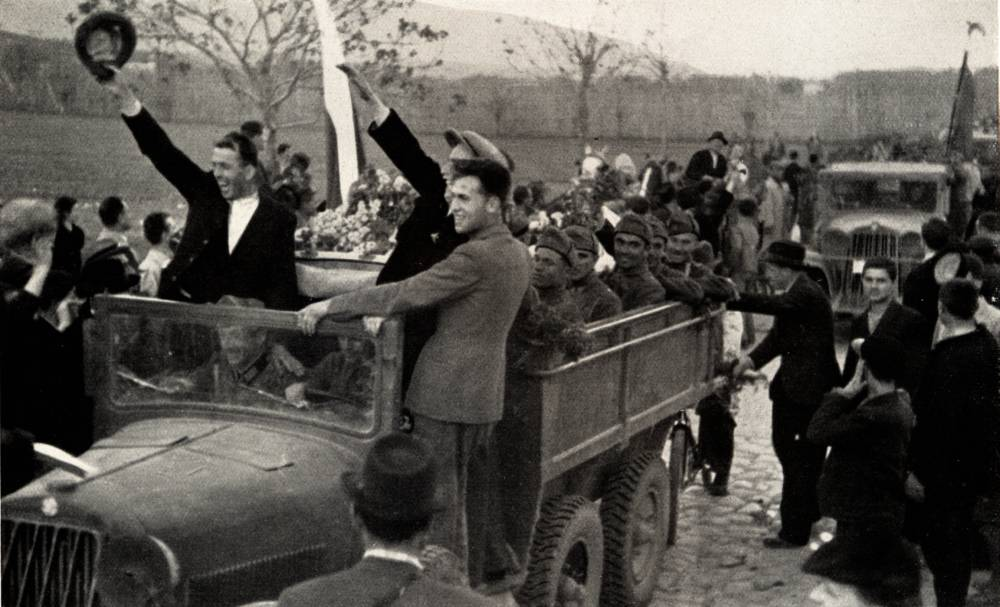
Bulgarian soldiers in Vardar Macedonia during the Balkans campaign

The Tsardom of Bulgaria was ruled by Тsar Boris III when it signed the Tripartite Pact on 1 March 1941. Bulgaria had been on the losing side in the First World War and sought a return of what the Bulgarian leadership saw as lost ethnically and historically Bulgarian territories, specifically in Macedonia and Thrace (divided between the Kingdom of Yugoslavia, the Kingdom of Greece, and Turkey). During the 1930s, because of traditional right-wing elements, Bulgaria drew closer to Nazi Germany. In 1940 Germany pressured Romania to sign the Treaty of Craiova, returning to Bulgaria the region of Southern Dobrudja, which it had lost in 1913. The Germans also promised Bulgaria – if it joined the Axis – an enlargement of its territory to the borders specified in the Treaty of San Stefano.

Bulgaria participated in the Axis invasion of Yugoslavia and Greece by letting German troops attack from its territory and sent troops to Greece on April 20. As a reward, the Axis powers allowed Bulgaria to occupy parts of both countries – southern and south-eastern Yugoslavia (Vardar Banovina) and north-eastern Greece (parts of Greek Macedonia and Greek Thrace). The Bulgarian forces in these areas spent the following years fighting various nationalist groups and resistance movements. Despite German pressure, Bulgaria did not take part in the Axis invasion of the Soviet Union and actually never declared war on the Soviet Union. The Bulgarian Navy was nonetheless involved in a number of skirmishes with the Soviet Black Sea Fleet, which attacked Bulgarian shipping.

Following the Japanese attack on Pearl Harbor in December 1941, the Bulgarian government declared war on the Western Allies. This action remained largely symbolic (at least from the Bulgarian perspective), until August 1943, when Bulgarian air defense and air force attacked Allied bombers, returning (heavily damaged) from a mission over the Romanian oil refineries. This turned into a disaster for the citizens of Sofia and other major Bulgarian cities, which were heavily bombed by the Allies in the winter of 1943–1944.

On 2 September 1944, as the Red Army approached the Bulgarian border, a new Bulgarian government came to power and sought peace with the Allies, expelled the few remaining German troops, and declared neutrality. These measures however did not prevent the Soviet Union from declaring war on Bulgaria on 5 September, and on 8 September the Red Army marched into the country, meeting no resistance. This was followed by the coup d'état of 9 September 1944, which brought a government of the pro-Soviet Fatherland Front to power. After this, the Bulgarian army (as part of the Red Army's 3rd Ukrainian Front) fought the Germans in Yugoslavia and Hungary, sustaining numerous casualties. Despite this, the Paris Peace Treaty treated Bulgaria as one of the defeated countries. Bulgaria was allowed to keep Southern Dobruja, but had to give up all claims to Greek and Yugoslav territory.

=== Independent State of Croatia ===
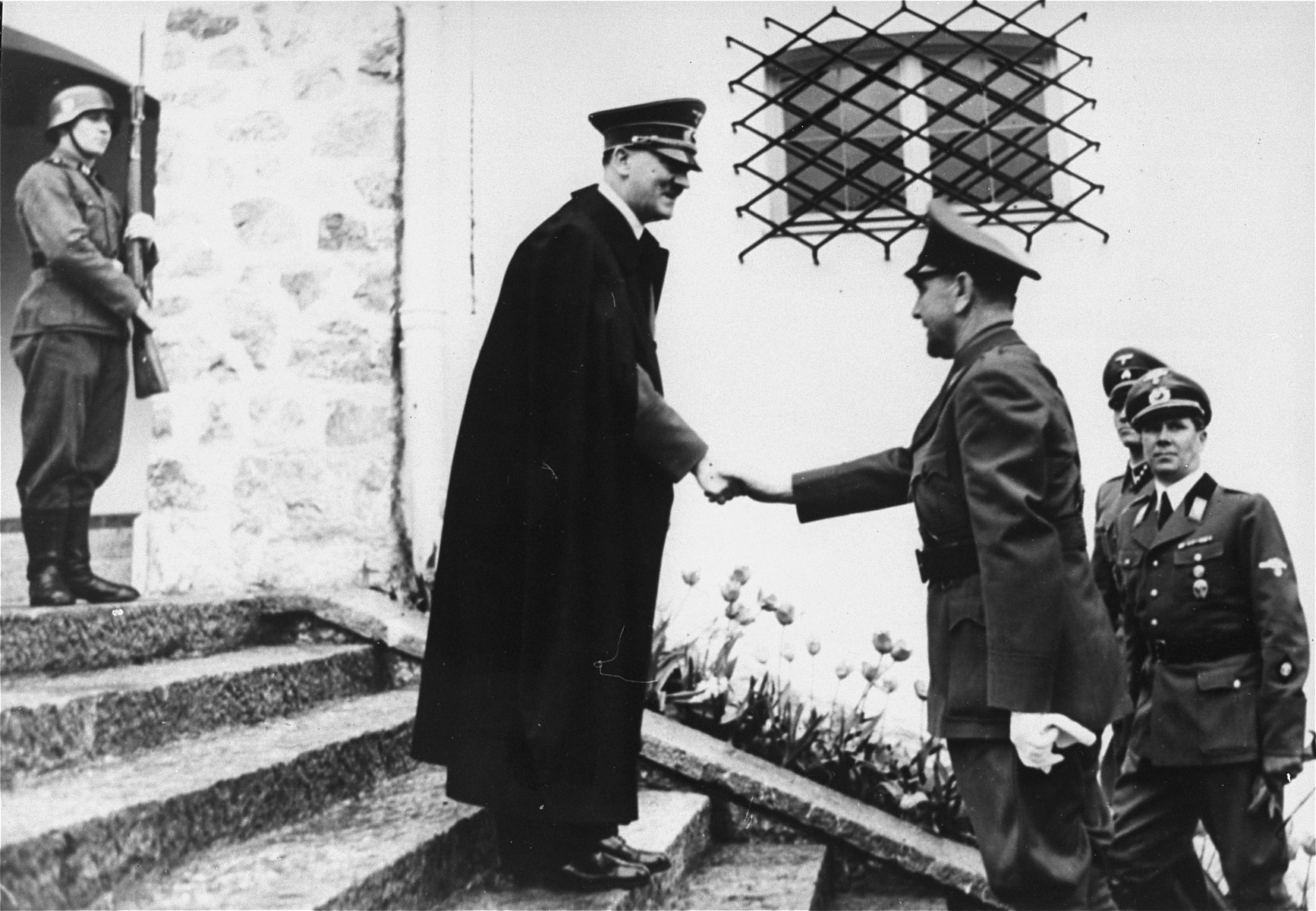
Adolf Hitler meeting with NDH leader Ante Pavelić

On 10 April 1941, the so-called Independent State of Croatia (Nezavisna Država Hrvatska, or NDH), an installed German–Italian puppet state, co-signed the Tripartite Pact. The NDH remained a member of the Axis until the end of Second World War, its forces fighting for Germany even after its territory had been overrun by Yugoslav Partisans. On 16 April 1941, Ante Pavelić, a Croatian nationalist and one of the founders of the Ustaše ("Croatian Liberation Movement"), was proclaimed Poglavnik (leader) of the new regime.

Initially the Ustaše had been heavily influenced by Italy. They were actively supported by Mussolini's National Fascist Party regime in Italy, which gave the movement training grounds to prepare for war against Yugoslavia, as well as accepting Pavelić as an exile and allowing him to reside in Rome. In 1941 during the Italian invasion of Greece, Mussolini requested that Germany invade Yugoslavia to save the Italian forces in Greece. Hitler reluctantly agreed; Yugoslavia was invaded and the NDH was created. Pavelić led a delegation to Rome and offered the crown of the NDH to an Italian prince of the House of Savoy, who was crowned Tomislav II. The next day, Pavelić signed the Contracts of Rome with Mussolini, ceding Dalmatia to Italy and fixing the permanent borders between the NDH and Italy. Italian armed forces were allowed to control all of the coastline of the NDH, effectively giving Italy total control of the Adriatic coastline. When the King of Italy ousted Mussolini from power and Italy capitulated, the NDH became completely under German influence.

The platform of the Ustaše movement proclaimed that Croatians had been oppressed by the Serb-dominated Kingdom of Yugoslavia, and that Croatians deserved to have an independent nation after years of domination by foreign empires. The Ustaše perceived Serbs to be racially inferior to Croats and saw them as infiltrators who were occupying Croatian lands. They saw the extermination and expulsion or deportation of Serbs as necessary to racially purify Croatia. While part of Yugoslavia, many Croatian nationalists violently opposed the Serb-dominated Yugoslav monarchy, and assassinated Alexander I of Yugoslavia, together with the Internal Macedonian Revolutionary Organization. Ustashe forces fought against communist Yugoslav Partisan guerrilla throughout the war.

The Ustaše regime lacked general support among Croats and never accrued any significant support among the populace. The Ustaše regime was backed by parts of the Croat population that during the interwar period had felt oppressed in the Serb-led Yugoslavia. Most of the support it had initially gained by creating a Croatian national state was lost because of the brutal practices it used.

Upon coming to power, Pavelić formed the Croatian Home Guard (Hrvatsko domobranstvo) as the official military force of the NDH. Originally authorized at 16,000 men, it grew to a peak fighting force of 130,000. The Croatian Home Guard included an air force and navy, although its navy was restricted in size by the Contracts of Rome. In addition to the Croatian Home Guard, Pavelić was also the supreme commander of the Ustaše militia, although all NDH military units were generally under the command of the German or Italian formations in their area of operations.

The Ustaše government declared war on the Soviet Union, signed the Anti-Comintern Pact of 1941, and sent troops to Germany's Eastern Front. Ustaše militia were garrisoned in the Balkans, battling the communist partisans.

The Ustaše government applied racial laws on Serbs, Jews, and Romani people, as well as targeting those opposed to the fascist regime, and after June 1941 deported them to the Jasenovac concentration camp or to Nazi concentration camps in Poland. The racial laws were enforced by the Ustaše militia. The exact number of victims of the Ustaše regime is uncertain due to the destruction of documents and varying numbers given by historians. According to the United States Holocaust Memorial Museum in Washington, D.C., between 320,000 and 340,000 Serbs were killed in the NDH.

=== Yugoslavia (two-day membership) ===
Yugoslavia was largely surrounded by members of the pact and now bordered the German Reich. From late 1940 Hitler sought a non-aggression pact with Yugoslavia. In February 1941, Hitler called for Yugoslavia's accession to the Tripartite Pact, but the Yugoslav government delayed. In March, divisions of the German army arrived at the Bulgarian-Yugoslav border and permission was sought for them to pass through to attack Greece. On 25 March 1941, fearing that Yugoslavia would be invaded otherwise, the Yugoslav government signed the Tripartite Pact with significant reservations. Unlike other Axis powers, Yugoslavia was not obliged to provide military assistance, nor to provide its territory for Axis to move military forces during the war. Less than two days later, after demonstrations in the streets of Belgrade, Prince Paul and the government were removed from office by a coup d'état. Seventeen-year-old King Peter was declared to be of age. The new Yugoslav government under General Dušan Simović, refused to ratify Yugoslavia's signing of the Tripartite Pact, and started negotiations with Great Britain and Soviet Union. Winston Churchill commented that "Yugoslavia has found its soul"; however, Hitler invaded and quickly took control.

== Anti-Comintern Pact signatories ==
Some countries signed the Anti-Comintern Pact but not the Tripartite Pact. As such their adherence to the Axis may have been less than that of Tripartite Pact signatories. Some of these states were officially at war with members of the Allied powers, others remained neutral in the war and sent only volunteers. Signing the Anti-Comintern Pact was seen as "a litmus test of loyalty" by the Nazi leadership.

=== China (Reorganized National Government of China) ===
During the Second Sino-Japanese War, Japan advanced from its bases in Manchuria to occupy much of East and Central China. Several Japanese puppet states were organized in areas occupied by the Imperial Japanese Armed Forces, including the Provisional Government of the Republic of China at Beijing, which was formed in 1937, and the Reformed Government of the Republic of China at Nanjing, which was formed in 1938. These governments were merged into the Reorganized National Government of China at Nanjing on 29 March 1940. Wang Jingwei became head of state. The government was to be run along the same lines as the Nationalist regime and adopted its symbols.

The Nanjing Government had no real power; its main role was to act as a propaganda tool for the Japanese. The Nanjing Government concluded agreements with Japan and Manchukuo, authorising Japanese occupation of China and recognising the independence of Manchukuo under Japanese protection. The Nanjing Government signed the Anti-Comintern Pact of 1941 and declared war on the United States and the United Kingdom on 9 January 1943.

The government had a strained relationship with the Japanese from the beginning. Wang's insistence on his regime being the true Nationalist government of China and in replicating all the symbols of the Kuomintang led to frequent conflicts with the Japanese, the most prominent being the issue of the regime's flag, which was identical to that of the Republic of China.

The worsening situation for Japan from 1943 onwards meant that the Nanjing Army was given a more substantial role in the defence of occupied China than the Japanese had initially envisaged. The army was almost continuously employed against the communist New Fourth Army. Wang Jingwei died on 10 November 1944, and was succeeded by his deputy, Chen Gongbo. Chen had little influence; the real power behind the regime was Zhou Fohai, the mayor of Shanghai. Wang's death dispelled what little legitimacy the regime had. On 9 September 1945, following the defeat of Japan, the area was surrendered to General He Yingqin, a nationalist general loyal to Chiang Kai-shek. Chen Gongbo was tried and executed in 1946.

=== Denmark ===
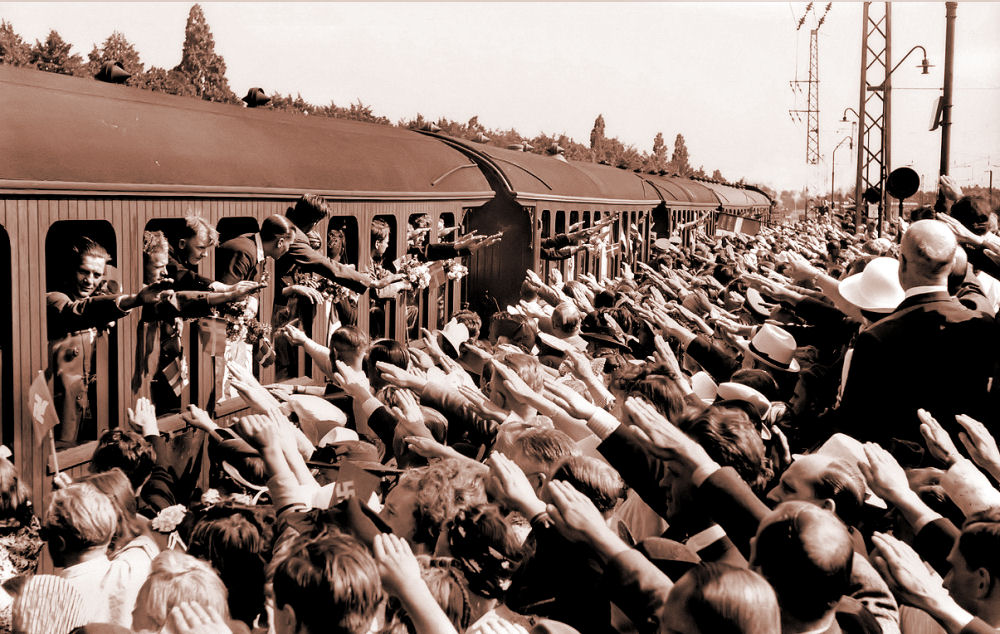
Members of Free Corps Denmark leaving for the Eastern Front from Hellerup railway station in Copenhagen (1941).

Denmark was occupied by Germany after April 1940 and never joined the Axis. On 31 May 1939, Denmark and Germany signed a treaty of non-aggression, which did not contain any military obligations for either party. On April 9, Germany attacked Scandinavia, and the speed of the German invasion of Denmark prevented King Christian X and the Danish government from going into exile. They had to accept "protection by the Reich" and the stationing of German forces in exchange for nominal independence. Denmark coordinated its foreign policy with Germany, extending diplomatic recognition to Axis collaborator and puppet regimes, and breaking diplomatic relations with the Allied governments-in-exile. Denmark broke diplomatic relations with the Soviet Union and signed the Anti-Comintern Pact in 1941. However the United States and Britain ignored Denmark and worked with Henrik Kauffmann Denmark's ambassador in the US when it came to dealings about using Iceland, Greenland, and the Danish merchant fleet against Germany.

In 1941 Danish Nazis set up the Frikorps Danmark. Thousands of volunteers fought and many died as part of the German Army on the Eastern Front. Denmark sold agricultural and industrial products to Germany and made loans for armaments and fortifications. The German presence in Denmark included the construction of part of the Atlantic Wall fortifications which Denmark paid for and was never reimbursed.

The Danish protectorate government lasted until 29 August 1943, when the cabinet resigned after the regularly scheduled and largely free election concluding the Folketing's current term. The Germans imposed martial law following Operation Safari, and Danish collaboration continued on an administrative level, with the Danish bureaucracy functioning under German command. The Royal Danish Navy scuttled 32 of its larger ships; Germany seized 64 ships and later raised and refitted 15 of the sunken vessels. 13 warships escaped to Sweden and formed a Danish naval flotilla in exile. Sweden allowed formation of a Danish military brigade in exile; it did not see combat. The Danish resistance movement was active in sabotage and issuing underground newspapers and blacklists of collaborators.

=== Finland ===
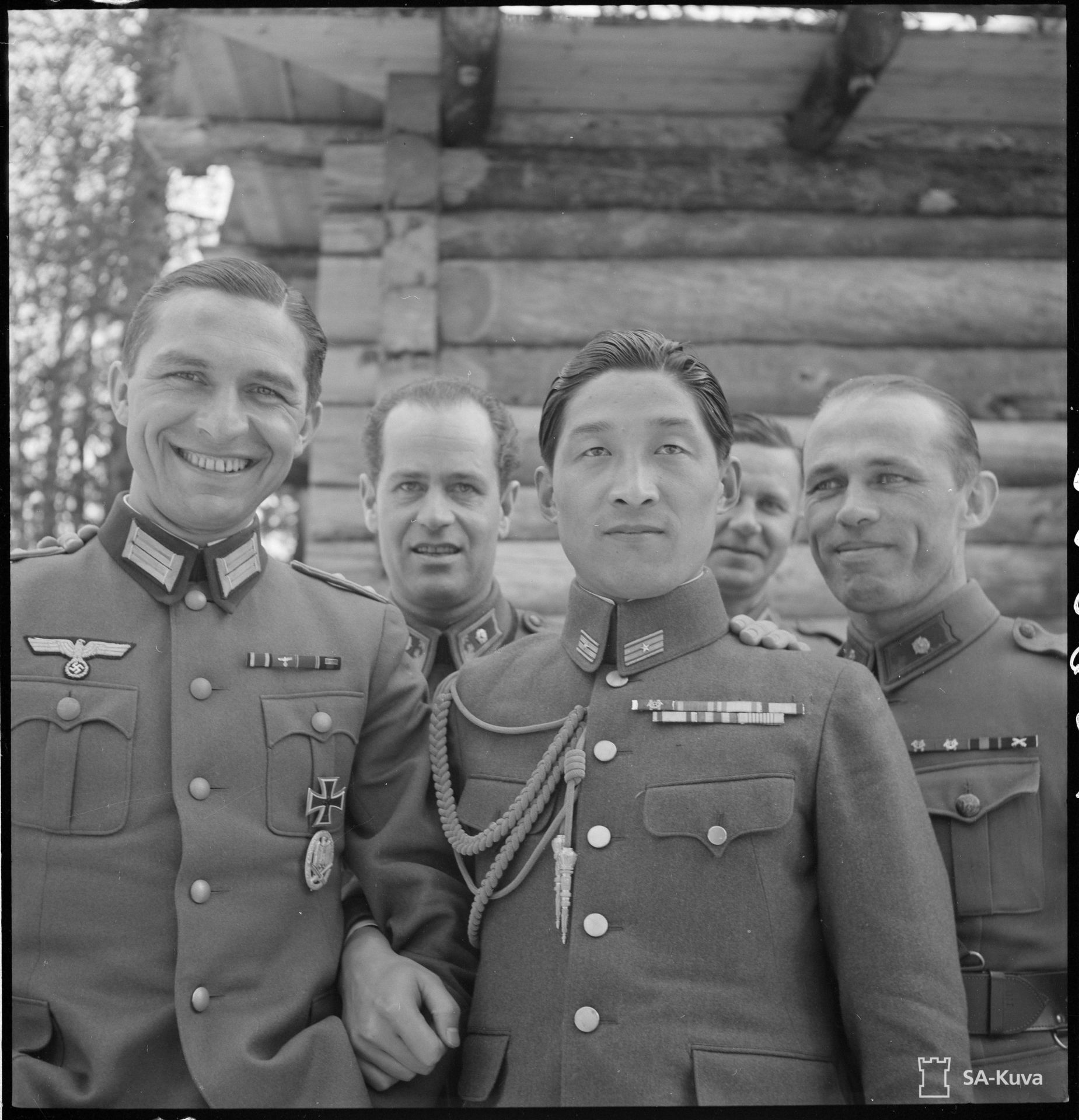
The visit of German, Italian, Japanese, Hungarian and Romanian military delegates in the Uhtua sector of the front on 5 April 1943

Although Finland never signed the Tripartite Pact, it fought against the Soviet Union alongside Germany in the 1941–44 Continuation War, during which the official position of the wartime Finnish government was that Finland was a co-belligerent of the Germans whom they described as "brothers-in-arms". Finland did sign the revived Anti-Comintern Pact of November 1941. Finland signed a peace treaty with the Allied powers in 1947 which described Finland as having been "an ally of Hitlerite Germany" during the continuation war. As such, Finland was the only democracy to join the Axis. Finland's relative independence from Germany put it in the most advantageous position of all the minor Axis powers. Finland was unusual in the Axis in its relative lack of participation in the Holocaust, and its lack of a fascist regime.

Whilst Finland's relationship with Nazi Germany during the Continuation War remains controversial within Finland, in a 2008 Helsingin Sanomat survey of 28 Finnish historians, 16 agreed that Finland had been an ally of Nazi Germany, with only 6 disagreeing.

The August 1939 Molotov–Ribbentrop Pact between Germany and the Soviet Union contained a secret protocol dividing much of eastern Europe and assigning Finland to the Soviet sphere of influence. After unsuccessfully attempting to force territorial and other concessions on the Finns, the Soviet Union invaded Finland in November 1939, launching the Winter War, intending to establish a communist puppet government in Finland. The conflict threatened Germany's iron-ore supplies and offered the prospect of Allied interference in the region. Despite Finnish resistance, a peace treaty was signed in March 1940, wherein Finland ceded some key territory to the Soviet Union, including the Karelian Isthmus, containing Finland's second-largest city, Viipuri, and the critical defensive structure of the Mannerheim Line. After this war, Finland sought protection and support from the United Kingdom and non-aligned Sweden, but was thwarted by Soviet and German actions. This resulted in Finland being drawn closer to Germany, first with the intent of enlisting German support as a counterweight to thwart continuing Soviet pressure, and later to help regain lost territories.

In the opening days of Operation Barbarossa, Germany's invasion of the Soviet Union, Finland permitted German planes returning from mine dropping runs over Kronstadt and Neva River to refuel at Finnish airfields before returning to bases in East Prussia. In retaliation, the Soviet Union launched a major air offensive against Finnish Air Force bases and towns, which resulted in a Finnish declaration of war against the Soviet Union on 25 June 1941. The Finnish conflict with the Soviet Union is generally referred to as the Continuation War.

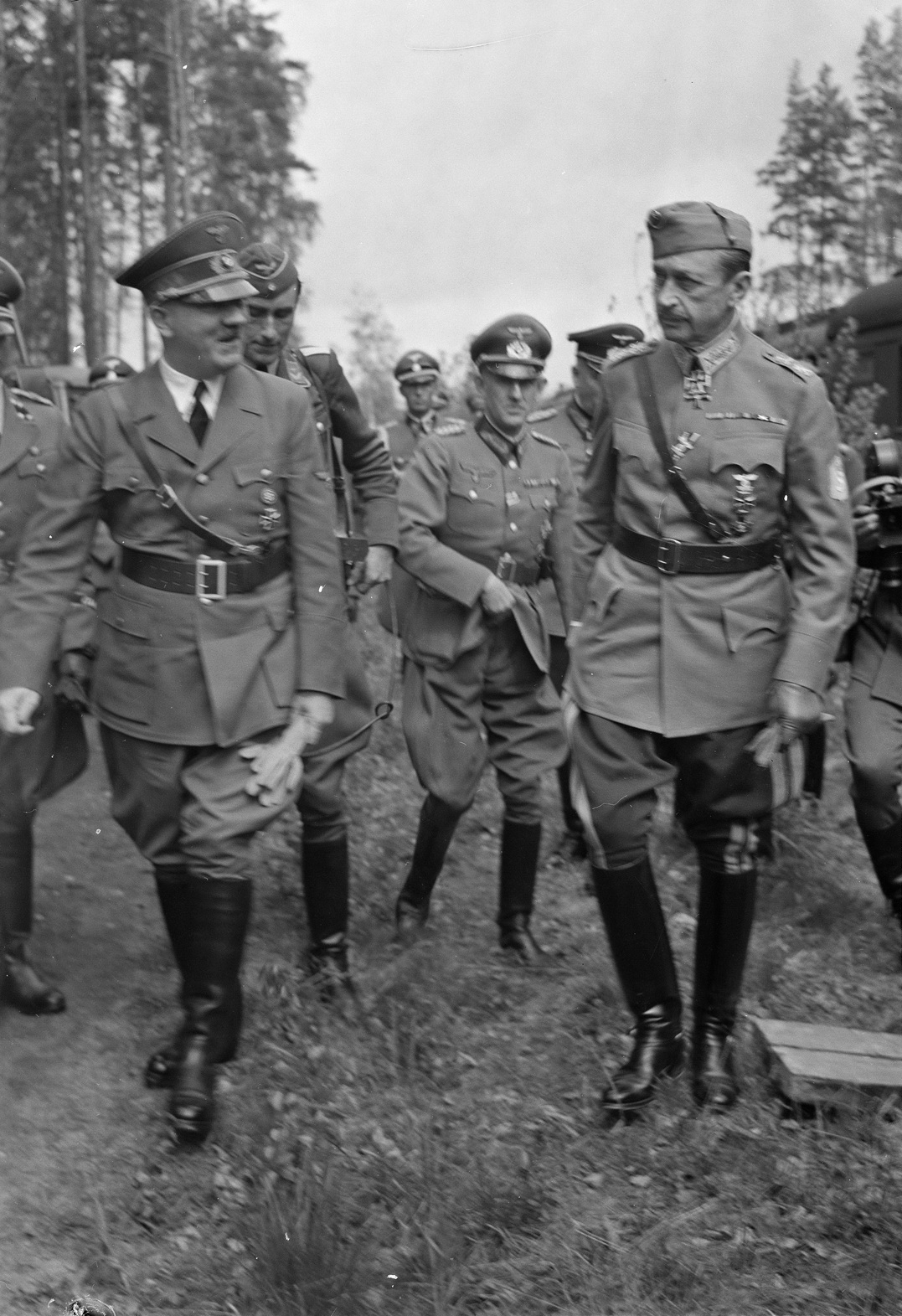
Mannerheim with Hitler

Finland's main objective was to regain territory lost to the Soviet Union in the Winter War. However, on 10 July 1941, Field Marshal Carl Gustaf Emil Mannerheim issued an Order of the Day that contained a formulation understood internationally as a Finnish territorial interest in Russian Karelia.

Diplomatic relations between the United Kingdom and Finland were severed on 1 August 1941, after the British Royal Air Force bombed German forces in the Finnish village and port of Petsamo. The United Kingdom repeatedly called on Finland to cease its offensive against the Soviet Union, and declared war on Finland on 6 December 1941, although no other military operations followed. War was never declared between Finland and the United States, though relations were severed between the two countries in 1944 as a result of the Ryti-Ribbentrop Agreement.

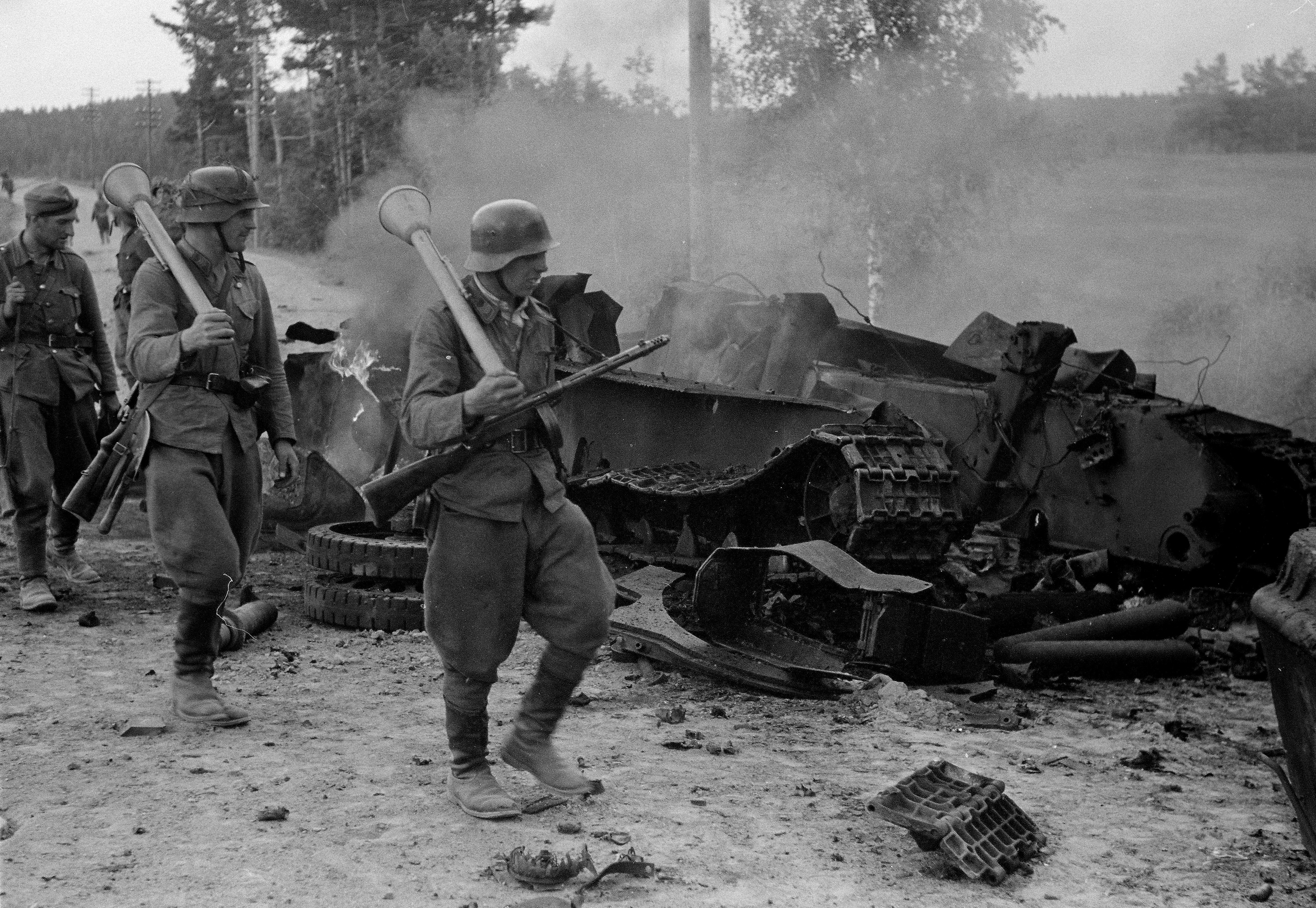
Finnish troops passing by the remains of a destroyed Soviet T-34 at the battle of Tali-Ihantala

Finland maintained command of its armed forces and pursued war objectives independently of Germany. Germans and Finns did work closely together during Operation Silver Fox, a joint offensive against Murmansk. Finland took part in the Siege of Leningrad. Finland was one of Germany's most important allies in its war with the USSR.

The relationship between Finland and Germany was also affected by the Ryti-Ribbentrop Agreement, which was presented as a German condition for help with munitions and air support, as the Soviet offensive coordinated with D-Day threatened Finland with complete occupation. The agreement, signed by President Risto Ryti but never ratified by the Finnish Parliament, bound Finland not to seek a separate peace.

After Soviet offensives were fought to a standstill, Ryti's successor as president, Marshal Carl Gustaf Emil Mannerheim, dismissed the agreement and opened secret negotiations with the Soviets, which resulted in a ceasefire on 4 September and the Moscow Armistice on 19 September 1944. Under the terms of the armistice, Finland was obliged to expel German troops from Finnish territory, which resulted in the Lapland War.

=== Manchuria (Manchukuo) ===
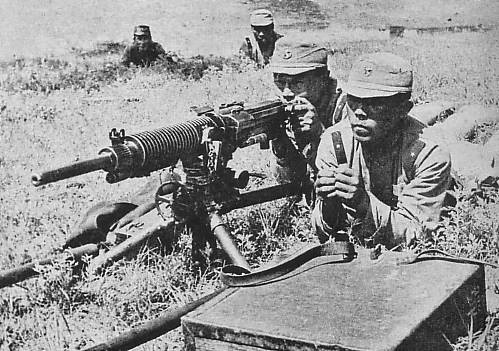
Manchurian soldiers training in a military exercise

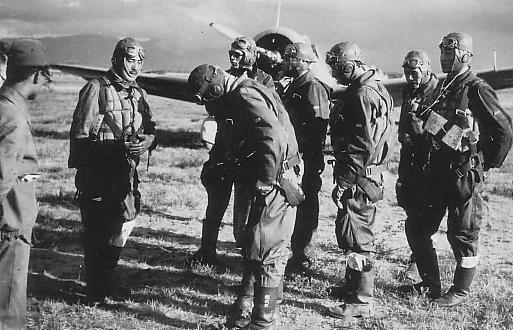
Manchurian pilots of the Manchukuo Air Force

Manchukuo, in the northeast region of China, had been a Japanese puppet state in Manchuria since the 1930s. It was nominally ruled by Puyi, the last Chinese Emperor of the Qing Dynasty, but was in fact controlled by the Japanese military, in particular the Kwantung Army. While Manchukuo ostensibly was a state for ethnic Manchus, the region had a Han Chinese majority.

Following the Japanese invasion of Manchuria in 1931, the independence of Manchukuo was proclaimed on 18 February 1932, with Puyi as head of state. He was proclaimed the Emperor of Manchukuo a year later. The new Manchu nation was recognized by 23 of the League of Nations' 80 members. Germany, Italy, and the Soviet Union were among the major powers who recognised Manchukuo. Other countries who recognized the State were the Dominican Republic, Costa Rica, and El Salvador. Manchukuo was also recognised by the other Japanese allies and puppet states, including Mengjiang, the Burmese government of Ba Maw, Thailand, the Wang Jingwei regime, and the Indian government of Subhas Chandra Bose. The League of Nations later declared in 1934 that Manchuria lawfully remained a part of China. This precipitated Japanese withdrawal from the League. The Manchukuoan state ceased to exist after the Soviet invasion of Manchuria in 1945.

Manchukuo signed the Anti-Comintern Pact in 1939, but never signed the Tripartite Pact.

=== Spain ===
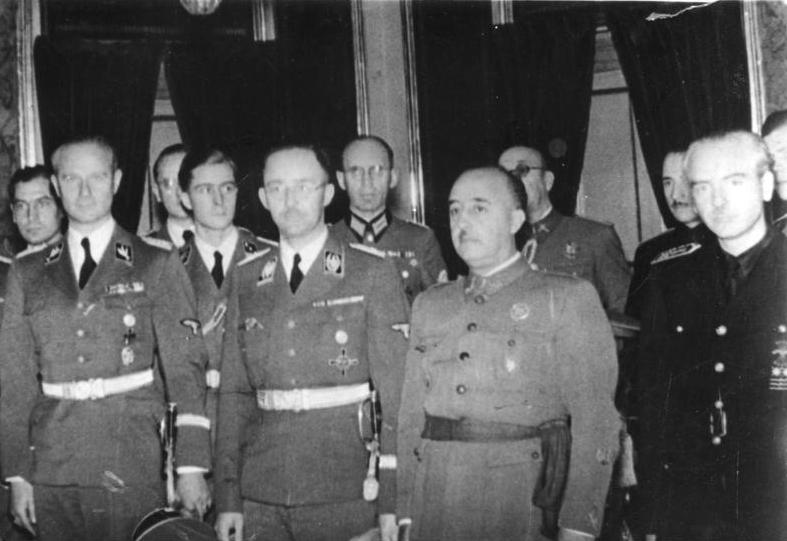
Front row in order from left to right: Karl Wolff, Heinrich Himmler, Francisco Franco and Spain's Foreign Minister Ramón Serrano Suñer in Madrid, October 1940

Francisco Franco (centre) and Ramón Serrano Suñer (left) meeting with Mussolini (right) in Bordighera, Italy in 1941. At Bordighera, Franco and Mussolini discussed the creation of a Latin Bloc.

Francisco Franco's dictatorship gave moral, economic, and military assistance to the Axis powers while nominally maintaining neutrality. Franco described Spain as a member of the Axis and signed the Anti-Comintern Pact in 1941 with Hitler and Mussolini. Members of the ruling Falange party in Spain held irredentist designs on Gibraltar. Falangists also supported Spanish colonial acquisition of the Tangier International Zone, French Morocco and northwestern French Algeria. In addition, Spain held ambitions on former Spanish colonies in Latin America. In June 1940 the Spanish government approached Germany to propose an alliance in exchange for Germany recognizing Spain's territorial aims: the annexation of the Oran Province of Algeria, the incorporation of all of Morocco, the extension of Spanish Sahara southward to the twentieth parallel, and the incorporation of French Cameroons into Spanish Guinea. Spain invaded and occupied the Tangier International Zone, maintaining its occupation until 1945. The occupation caused a dispute between Britain and Spain in November 1940; Spain conceded to protect British rights in the area and promised not to fortify the area. The Spanish government secretly held expansionist plans towards Portugal that it made known to the German government. In a communiqué with Germany on 26 May 1942, Franco declared that Portugal should be annexed into Spain.

Franco had previously won the Spanish Civil War with the help of Nazi Germany and Fascist Italy. Both were eager to establish another fascist state in Europe. Spain owed Germany over $212 million for supplies of matériel during the Spanish Civil War, and Italian Corpo Truppe Volontarie combat troops had actually fought in Spain on the side of Franco's Nationalists.

When Germany invaded the Soviet Union in 1941, Franco immediately offered to form a unit of military volunteers to join the invasion. This was accepted by Hitler and within two weeks there were more than enough volunteers to form the Blue Division (División Azul) under General Agustín Muñoz Grandes.

The possibility of Spanish intervention in World War II was of concern to the United States, which investigated the activities of Spain's ruling Falange Espanola Tradicionalista y de las JONS in Latin America, especially Puerto Rico, where pro-Falange and pro-Franco sentiment was high, even amongst the ruling upper classes. The Falangists promoted the idea of supporting Spain's former colonies in fighting against American domination. Prior to the outbreak of war, support for Franco and the Falange was high in the Philippines. The Falange Exterior, the international department of the Falange, collaborated with Japanese forces against the United States Armed Forces and the Philippine Commonwealth Army in the Philippines through the Philippine Falange.

== Bilateral pacts with the Axis powers ==
Some countries colluded with Germany, Italy, and Japan without signing either the Anti-Comintern Pact, or the Tripartite Pact. In some cases these bilateral agreements were formalised, in other cases it was less formal. Some of these countries were puppet states established by the Axis powers themselves.

=== Burma (Ba Maw government) ===
The Japanese Army and Burma nationalists, led by Aung San, seized control of Burma from the United Kingdom during 1942. A State of Burma was formed on 1 August 1943 under the Burmese nationalist leader Ba Maw. A treaty of alliance was concluded between the Ba Maw regime and Japan was signed by Ba Maw for Burma and Sawada Renzo for Japan on the same day in which the Ba Maw government pledged itself to provide the Japanese "with every necessary assistance in order to execute a successful military operation in Burma". The Ba Maw government mobilised Burmese society during the war to support the Axis war-effort.

The Ba Maw regime established the Burma Defence Army (later renamed the Burma National Army), which was commanded by Aung San which fought alongside the Japanese in the Burma campaign. The Ba Maw has been described as a state having "independence without sovereignty" and as being effectively a Japanese puppet state. On 27 March 1945 the Burma National Army revolted against the Japanese.

=== Thailand ===
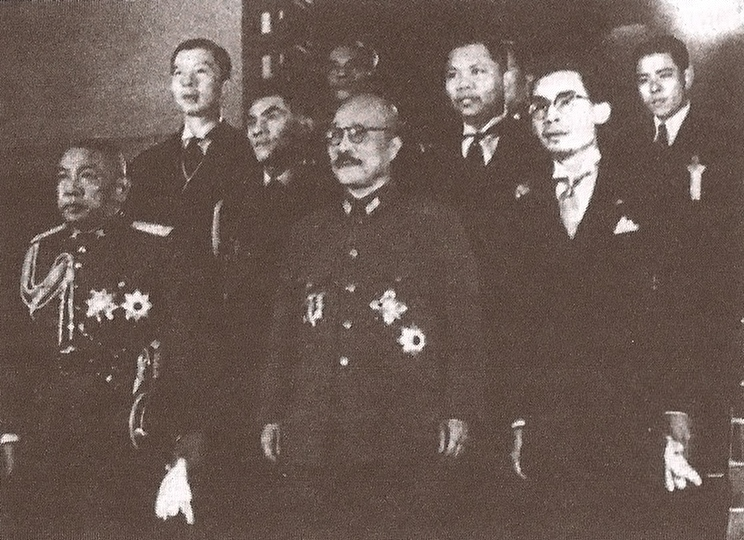
Phraya Phahon (far left), Thawan Thamrong (left) and Direk Jayanama (right) with Hideki Tōjō (center) in Tokyo 1942

As an ally of Japan during the war that deployed troops to fight on the Japanese side against Allied forces, Thailand is considered to have been part of the Axis alliance, or at least "aligned with the Axis powers". For example, writing in 1945, the American politician Clare Boothe Luce described Thailand as "undeniably an Axis country" during the war.

Thailand waged the Franco-Thai War in October 1940 to May 1941 to reclaim territory from French Indochina. Japanese forces invaded Thailand an hour and a half before the attack on Pearl Harbor (because of the International Dateline, the local time was on the morning of 8 December 1941). Only hours after the invasion, Prime Minister Field Marshal Phibunsongkhram ordered the cessation of resistance against the Japanese. An outline plan of Japan-Thailand joint military operations, whereby Thai forces would invade Burma to defend the right flank of Japanese forces, was agreed on 14 December 1941. On 21 December 1941, a military alliance with Japan was signed and on 25 January 1942, Sang Phathanothai read over the radio Thailand's formal declaration of war on the United Kingdom and the United States. The Thai ambassador to the United States, Mom Rajawongse Seni Pramoj, did not deliver his copy of the declaration of war. Therefore, although the British reciprocated by declaring war on Thailand and considered it a hostile country, the United States did not.

The Thais and Japanese agreed that the Burmese Shan State and Karenni State were to be under Thai control. The rest of Burma was to be under Japanese control. On 10 May 1942, the Thai Phayap Army entered Burma's eastern Shan State, which had been claimed by Siamese kingdoms. Three Thai infantry and one cavalry division, spearheaded by armoured reconnaissance groups and supported by the air force, engaged the retreating Chinese 93rd Division. Kengtung, the main objective, was captured on 27 May. Renewed offensives in June and November saw the Chinese retreat into Yunnan.

In November 1943 Thailand signed the Greater East Asia Joint Declaration, formally aligning itself with the Axis powers. The area containing the Shan States and Kayah State was annexed by Thailand in 1942, and four northern states of Malaya were also transferred to Thailand by Japan as a reward for Thai co-operation. These areas were ceded back to Burma and Malaya in 1945. Thai military losses totalled 5,559 men during the war, of whom about 180 died resisting the Japanese invasion of 8 December 1941, roughly 150 died in action during the fighting in the Shan States, and the rest died of malaria and other diseases. The Free Thai Movement ("Seri Thai") was established during these first few months. Parallel Free Thai organizations were also established in the United Kingdom. The king's aunt, Queen Rambai Barni, was the nominal head of the British-based organization, and Pridi Banomyong, the regent, headed its largest contingent, which was operating within Thailand. Aided by elements of the military, secret airfields and training camps were established, while American Office of Strategic Services and British Force 136 agents slipped in and out of the country.

As the war dragged on, the Thai population came to resent the Japanese presence. In June 1944, Phibun was overthrown in a coup d'état. The new civilian government under Khuang Aphaiwong attempted to aid the resistance while maintaining cordial relations with the Japanese. After the war, U.S. influence prevented Thailand from being treated as an Axis country, but the British demanded three million tons of rice as reparations and the return of areas annexed from Malaya during the war. Thailand also returned the portions of British Burma and French Indochina that had been annexed. Phibun and a number of his associates were put on trial on charges of having committed war crimes and of collaborating with the Axis powers. However, the charges were dropped due to intense public pressure. Public opinion was favourable to Phibun, as he was thought to have done his best to protect Thai interests.

=== Soviet Union ===
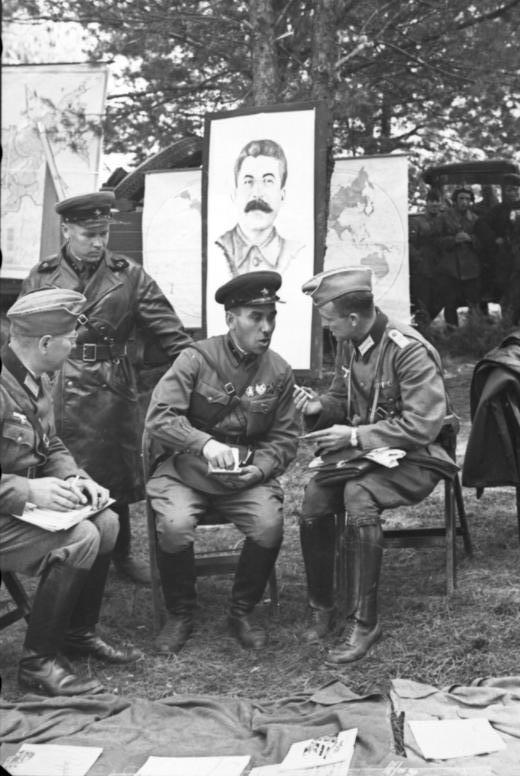
German and Soviet soldiers during the official transfer of Brest to Soviet control in front of picture of Stalin, in the aftermath of the invasion and partition of Poland by Nazi Germany and the Soviet Union in 1939

In 1939 the Soviet Union considered forming an alliance with either Britain and France or with Germany. When negotiations with Britain and France failed, they turned to Germany and signed the Molotov–Ribbentrop Pact in August 1939. Germany was now freed from the risk of war with the Soviets, and was assured a supply of oil. This included a secret protocol whereby territories controlled by Poland, Finland, Estonia, Romania, Latvia and Lithuania were divided into spheres of interest of the parties. The Soviet Union sought to re-annex some of territories that were under control of those states, formerly acquired by the Russian Empire in the centuries prior and lost to Russia in the aftermath of World War I; that included land such as the Kresy (Western Belarus and Western Ukraine) region ceded to Poland after losing the Soviet-Polish War of 1919–1921.

On 1 September, barely a week after the pact had been signed, Germany invaded Poland. The Soviet Union invaded Poland from the east on 17 September and on 28 September signed a secret treaty with Nazi Germany to coordinate fighting against the Polish resistance. The Soviets targeted intelligence, entrepreneurs and officers with mass arrests, with many victims sent to the Gulag in Siberia, committing a string of atrocities that culminated in the Katyn massacre. Soon after the invasion of Poland, the Soviet Union occupied the Baltic countries of Estonia, Latvia and Lithuania, and annexed Bessarabia and Northern Bukovina from Romania. The Soviet Union attacked Finland on 30 November 1939, which started the Winter War. Finnish defenses prevented an all-out invasion, resulting in an interim peace, but Finland was forced to cede strategically important border areas near Leningrad.

The Soviet Union provided material support to Germany in the war effort against Western Europe through a pair of commercial agreements, the first in 1939 and the second in 1940, which involved exports of raw materials (phosphates, chromium and iron ore, mineral oil, grain, cotton, and rubber). These and other export goods transported through Soviet and occupied Polish territories allowed Germany to circumvent the British naval blockade. In October and November 1940, German–Soviet talks about the potential of joining the Axis took place in Berlin. Joseph Stalin later personally countered with a separate proposal in a letter on 25 November that contained several secret protocols, including that "the area south of Batum and Baku in the general direction of the Persian Gulf is recognized as the center of aspirations of the Soviet Union", referring to an area approximating present day Iraq and Iran, and a Soviet claim to Bulgaria. Hitler never responded to Stalin's letter. Shortly thereafter, Hitler issued a secret directive on the invasion of the Soviet Union. Reasons included the Nazi ideologies of Lebensraum and Heim ins Reich

=== Vichy France ===
The German army entered Paris on 14 June 1940, following the battle of France. Pétain became the last Prime Minister of the French Third Republic on 16 June 1940. He sued for peace with Germany and on 22 June 1940, the French government concluded an armistice with Hitler and Mussolini, which came into effect at midnight on 25 June. Under the terms of the agreement, Germany occupied two-thirds of France, including Paris. Pétain was permitted to keep an "armistice army" of 100,000 men within the unoccupied southern zone. This number included neither the army based in the French colonial empire nor the French Navy. In Africa the Vichy regime was permitted to maintain 127,000. The French also maintained substantial garrisons at the French-mandate territory of Syria and Greater Lebanon, the French colony of Madagascar, and in French Somaliland. Some members of the Vichy government pushed for closer cooperation, but they were rebuffed by Pétain. Neither did Hitler accept that France could ever become a full military partner, and constantly prevented the buildup of Vichy's military strength.

After the armistice, relations between the Vichy French and the British quickly worsened. Although the French had told Churchill they would not allow their fleet to be taken by the Germans, the British launched naval attacks intended to prevent the French navy being used, the most notable of which was the attack on the Algerian harbour of Mers el-Kebir on 3 July 1940. Though Churchill defended his controversial decision to attack the French fleet, the action deteriorated greatly the relations between France and Britain. German propaganda trumpeted these attacks as an absolute betrayal of the French people by their former allies.

France during the war; Occupied and annexed zones by Germany in shades of red, Italian occupation zones in shades of yellow and striped blue, "Free zone" in blue.

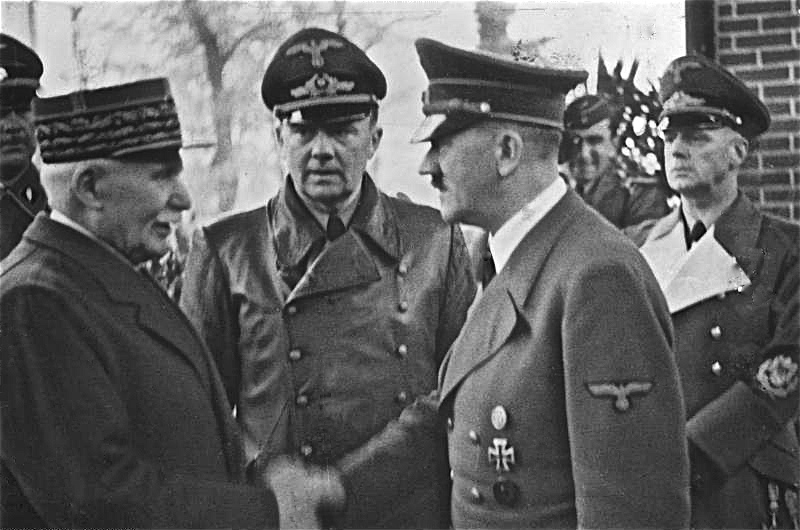
Philippe Pétain (left) meeting with Hitler in October 1940

Personal flag of Philippe Pétain, Chief of State of Vichy France

On 10 July 1940, Pétain was given emergency "full powers" by a majority vote of the French National Assembly. The following day approval of the new constitution by the Assembly effectively created the French State (l'État Français), replacing the French Republic with the government unofficially called "Vichy France," after the resort town of Vichy, where Pétain maintained his seat of government. This continued to be recognised as the lawful government of France by the neutral United States until 1942, while the United Kingdom had recognised de Gaulle's government-in-exile in London. Racial laws were introduced in France and its colonies and many foreign Jews in France were deported to Germany. Albert Lebrun, last President of the Republic, did not resign from the presidential office when he moved to Vizille on 10 July 1940. By 25 April 1945, during Pétain's trial, Lebrun argued that he thought he would be able to return to power after the fall of Germany, since he had not resigned.

In September 1940, Vichy France was forced to allow Japan to occupy French Indochina, a federation of French colonial possessions and protectorates encompassing modern day Vietnam, Laos, and Cambodia. The Vichy regime continued to administer them under Japanese military occupation. French Indochina was the base for the Japanese invasions of Thailand, Malaya, and the Dutch East Indies. On 26 September 1940, de Gaulle led an attack by Allied forces on the Vichy port of Dakar in French West Africa. Forces loyal to Pétain fired on de Gaulle and repulsed the attack after two days of heavy fighting, drawing Vichy France closer to Germany.

During the Anglo-Iraqi War of May 1941, Vichy France allowed Germany and Italy to use air bases in the French mandate of Syria to support the Iraqi revolt. British and Free French forces attacked later Syria and Lebanon in June–July 1941, and in 1942 Allied forces took over French Madagascar. More and more colonies abandoned Vichy, joining the Free French territories of French Equatorial Africa, Polynesia, New Caledonia and others who had sided with de Gaulle from the start.

In November 1942 Vichy French troops briefly resisted the landing of Allied troops in French North Africa for two days, until Admiral François Darlan negotiated a local ceasefire with the Allies. In response to the landings, German and Italian forces invaded the non-occupied zone in southern France and ended Vichy France as an entity with any kind of autonomy; it then became a puppet government for the occupied territories. In June 1943, the formerly Vichy-loyal colonial authorities in French North Africa led by Henri Giraud came to an agreement with the Free French to merge with their own interim regime with the French National Committee (Comité Français National, CFN) to form a provisional government in Algiers, known as the French Committee of National Liberation (Comité Français de Libération Nationale, CFLN) initially led by Darlan.

In 1943 the Milice, a paramilitary force which had been founded by Vichy, was subordinated to the Germans and assisted them in rounding up opponents and Jews, as well as fighting the French Resistance. The Germans recruited volunteers in units independent of Vichy. Partly as a result of the great animosity of many right-wingers against the pre-war Front Populaire, volunteers joined the German forces in their anti-communist crusade against the USSR. Almost 7,000 joined Légion des Volontaires Français (LVF) from 1941 to 1944. The LVF then formed the cadre of the Waffen-SS Division Charlemagne in 1944–1945, with a maximum strength of some 7,500. Both the LVF and the Division Charlemagne fought on the eastern front.

Deprived of any military assets, territory or resources, the members of the Vichy government continued to fulfil their role as German puppets, being quasi-prisoners in the so-called "Sigmaringen enclave" in a castle in Baden-Württemberg at the end of the war in May 1945.

=== Iraq ===
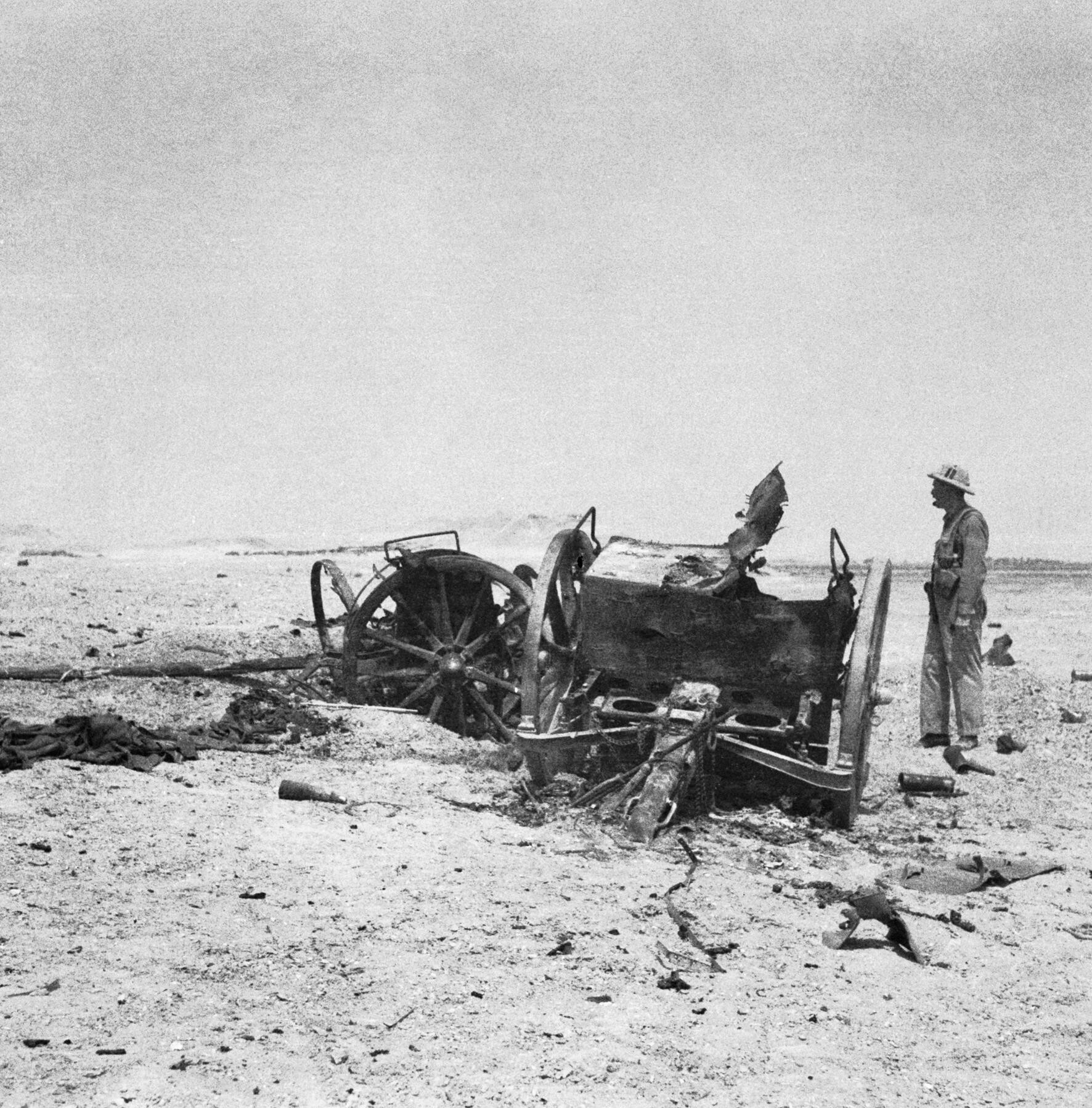
An RAF officer investigates wrecked Iraqi artillery near Habbaniya.

In April 1941 the Arab nationalist Rashīd ʿAlī al-Gaylānī, who was pro-Axis, seized power in Iraq. British forces responded by deploying to Iraq and in turn removing Rashi Ali from power. During fighting between Iraqi and British forces, Axis forces were deployed to Iraq to support the Iraqis. However, Rashid Ali was never able to conclude a formal alliance with the Axis.

Anti-British sentiments were widespread in Iraq prior to 1941. Rashid Ali al-Gaylani was appointed Prime Minister of Iraq in 1940. When Italy declared war on Britain, Rashid Ali had maintained ties with the Italians. This angered the British government. In December 1940, as relations with the British worsened, Rashid Ali formally requested weapons and military supplies from Germany. In January 1941 Rashid Ali was forced to resign as a result of British pressure.

In April 1941 Rashid Ali, on seizing power in a coup, repudiated the Anglo-Iraqi Treaty of 1930 and demanded that the British abandon their military bases and withdraw from the country.

On 9 May 1941, Mohammad Amin al-Husayni, the Grand Mufti of Jerusalem who was an associate of Rashid Ali and in asylum in Iraq, declared Jihad against the British and called on Arabs throughout the Middle East to rise up against British rule. On 25 May 1941, the Germans stepped up offensive operations in the Middle East.

Hitler issued Order 30: "The Arab Freedom Movement in the Middle East is our natural ally against England. In this connection special importance is attached to the liberation of Iraq ... I have therefore decided to move forward in the Middle East by supporting Iraq."

Hostilities between the Iraqi and British forces began on 2 May 1941, with heavy fighting at the RAF air base in Habbaniyah. The Germans and Italians dispatched aircraft and aircrew to Iraq utilizing Vichy French bases in Syria; this led to Australian, British, Indian and Free French forces entering and conquering Syria in June and July. With the advance of British and Indian forces on Baghdad, Iraqi military resistance ended by 31 May 1941. Rashid Ali and al-Husayn, the Grand Mufti of Jerusalem, fled to Iran, then Turkey, Italy, and finally Germany, where both were welcomed by Hitler and remained throughout the years of the war; Hitler considered Ali to be head of the Iraqi government-in-exile in Berlin.

== Puppet states ==
Various nominally-independent governments formed out of local sympathisers under varying degrees of German, Italian, and Japanese control were established within the territories that they occupied during the war. Some of these governments declared themselves to be neutral in the conflict with the allies, or never concluded any formal alliance with the Axis powers, but their effective control by the Axis powers rendered them in reality an extension of it and hence part of it. These differed from military authorities and civilian commissioners provided by the occupying power in that they were formed from nationals of the occupied country, and that the supposed legitimacy of the puppet state was recognised by the occupier de jure if not de facto.

=== German ===
The collaborationist administrations of German-occupied countries in Europe had varying degrees of autonomy, and not all of them qualified as fully recognized sovereign states. The General Government in occupied Poland was a fully German administration. In occupied Norway, the National Government headed by Vidkun Quisling – whose name came to symbolize pro-Axis collaboration in several languages – was subordinate to the Reichskommissariat Norwegen. It was never allowed to have any armed forces, be a recognized military partner, or have autonomy of any kind. In the occupied Netherlands, Anton Mussert was given the symbolic title of "Führer of the Netherlands' people". His National Socialist Movement formed a cabinet assisting the German administration, but was never recognized as a real Dutch government.

==== Albania (Albanian Kingdom) ====
After the Italian armistice, a vacuum of power opened up in Albania. The Italian occupying forces were rendered largely powerless, as the National Liberation Movement took control of the south and the National Front (Balli Kombëtar) took control of the north. Albanians in the Italian army joined the guerrilla forces. In September 1943 the guerrillas moved to take the capital of Tirana, but German paratroopers dropped into the city. Soon after the battle, the German High Command announced that they would recognize the independence of a greater Albania. They organized an Albanian government, police, and military in collaboration with the Balli Kombëtar. The Germans did not exert heavy control over Albania's administration, but instead attempted to gain popular appeal by giving their political partners what they wanted. Several Balli Kombëtar leaders held positions in the regime. The joint forces incorporated Kosovo, western Macedonia, southern Montenegro, and Presevo into the Albanian state. A High Council of Regency was created to carry out the functions of a head of state, while the government was headed mainly by Albanian conservative politicians. Albania was the only European country occupied by the Axis powers that ended World War II with a larger Jewish population than before the war. The Albanian government had refused to hand over their Jewish population. They provided Jewish families with forged documents and helped them disperse in the Albanian population. Albania was completely liberated on November 29, 1944.

==== Territory of the Military Commander in Serbia ====
The Government of National Salvation, also referred to as the Nedić regime, was the second Serbian puppet government, after the Commissioner Government, established on the Territory of the (German) Military Commander in Serbia (Note: Official name of the occupied territory translated from German: Gebiet des Militärbefehlshaber Serbiens, a German occupied territory.) during World War II. It was appointed by the German Military Commander in Serbia and operated from 29 August 1941 to October 1944. Although the Serbian puppet regime had some support, it was unpopular with a majority of Serbs who either joined the Yugoslav Partisans or Draža Mihailović's Chetniks. The Prime Minister throughout was General Milan Nedić. The Government of National Salvation was evacuated from Belgrade to Kitzbühel, Germany in the first week of October 1944 before the German withdrawal from Serbia was complete.

Racial laws were introduced in all occupied territories with immediate effects on Jews and Roma people, as well as causing the imprisonment of those opposed to Nazism. Several concentration camps were formed in Serbia and at the 1942 Anti-Freemason Exhibition in Belgrade the city was pronounced to be free of Jews (Judenfrei). On 1 April 1942, a Serbian Gestapo was formed. An estimated 120,000 people were interned in German-run concentration camps in Nedić's Serbia between 1941 and 1944. However the Banjica Concentration Camp was jointly run by the German Army and Nedic's regime. 50,000 to 80,000 were killed during this period. Serbia became the second country in Europe, following Estonia, to be proclaimed Judenfrei (free of Jews). Approximately 14,500 Serbian Jews – 90 percent of Serbia's Jewish population of 16,000 – were murdered in World War II.

Nedić was captured by the Americans when they occupied the former territory of Austria, and was subsequently handed over to the Yugoslav communist authorities to act as a witness against war criminals, on the understanding he would be returned to American custody to face trial by the Allies. The Yugoslav authorities refused to return Nedić to United States custody. He died on 4 February 1946 after either jumping or falling out of the window of a Belgrade hospital, under circumstances which remain unclear.

==== Italy (Italian Social Republic) ====
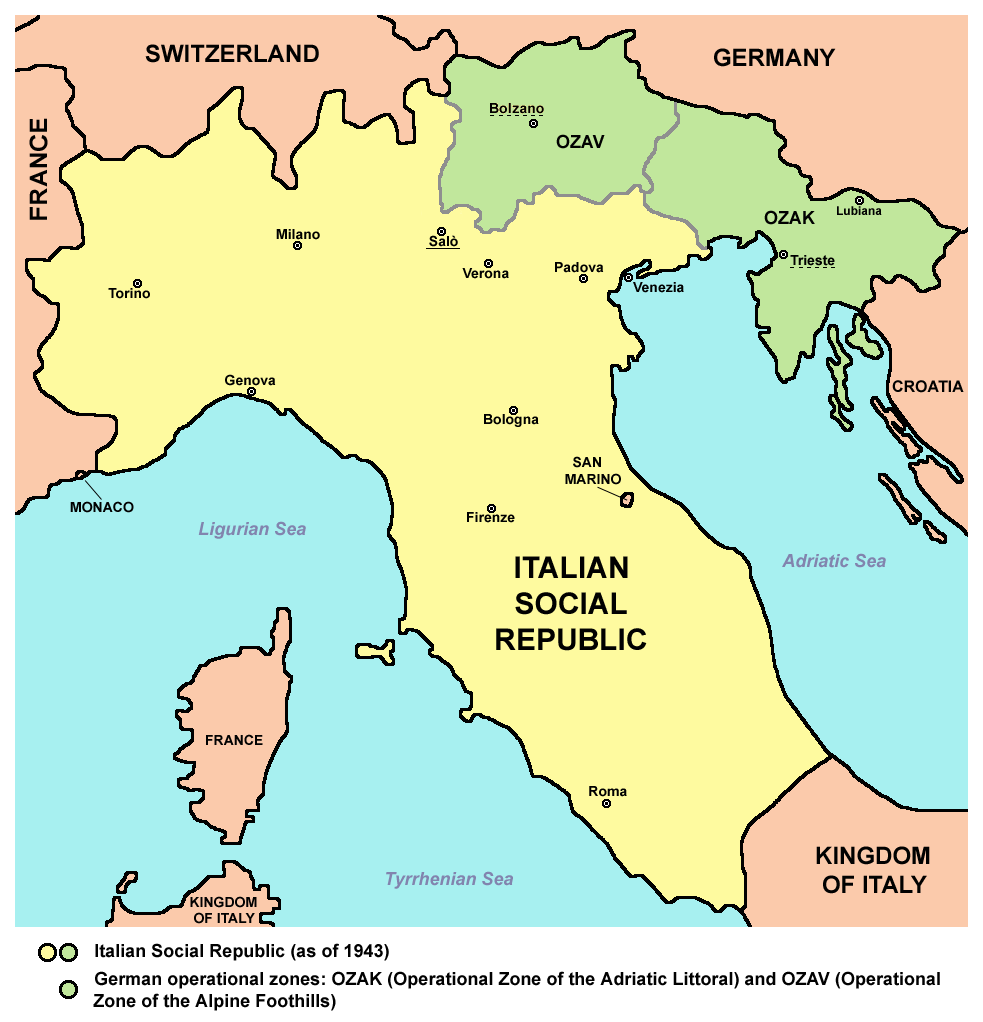
Italian Social Republic (RSI) as of 1943 German military operational zones (OZAV/OZAK) under direct German administration

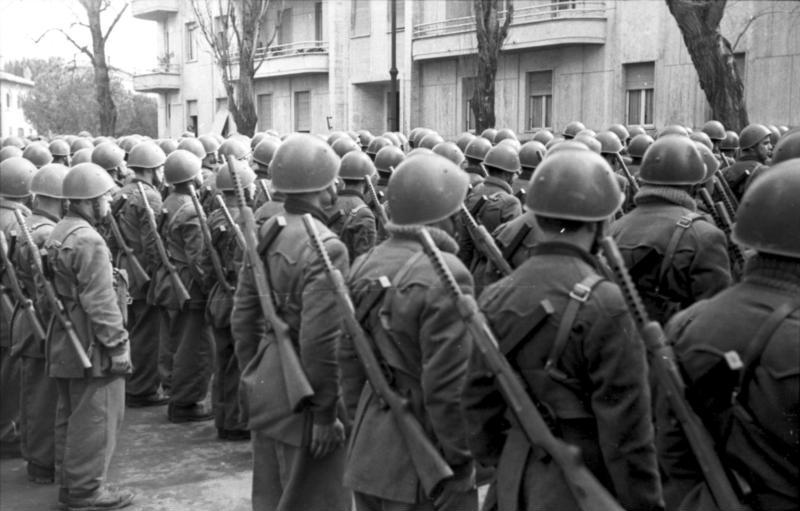
RSI (Repubblica Sociale Italiana) soldiers, March 1944

Italian Fascist leader Benito Mussolini formed the Italian Social Republic (Repubblica Sociale Italiana in Italian) on 23 September 1943, succeeding the Kingdom of Italy as a member of the Axis.

Mussolini had been removed from office and arrested by King Victor Emmanuel III on 25 July 1943. After the Italian armistice, in a raid led by German paratrooper Otto Skorzeny, Mussolini was rescued from arrest.

Once restored to power, Mussolini declared that Italy was a republic and that he was the new head of state. He was subject to German control for the duration of the war.

=== Joint German–Italian client states ===
==== Greece (Hellenic State) ====
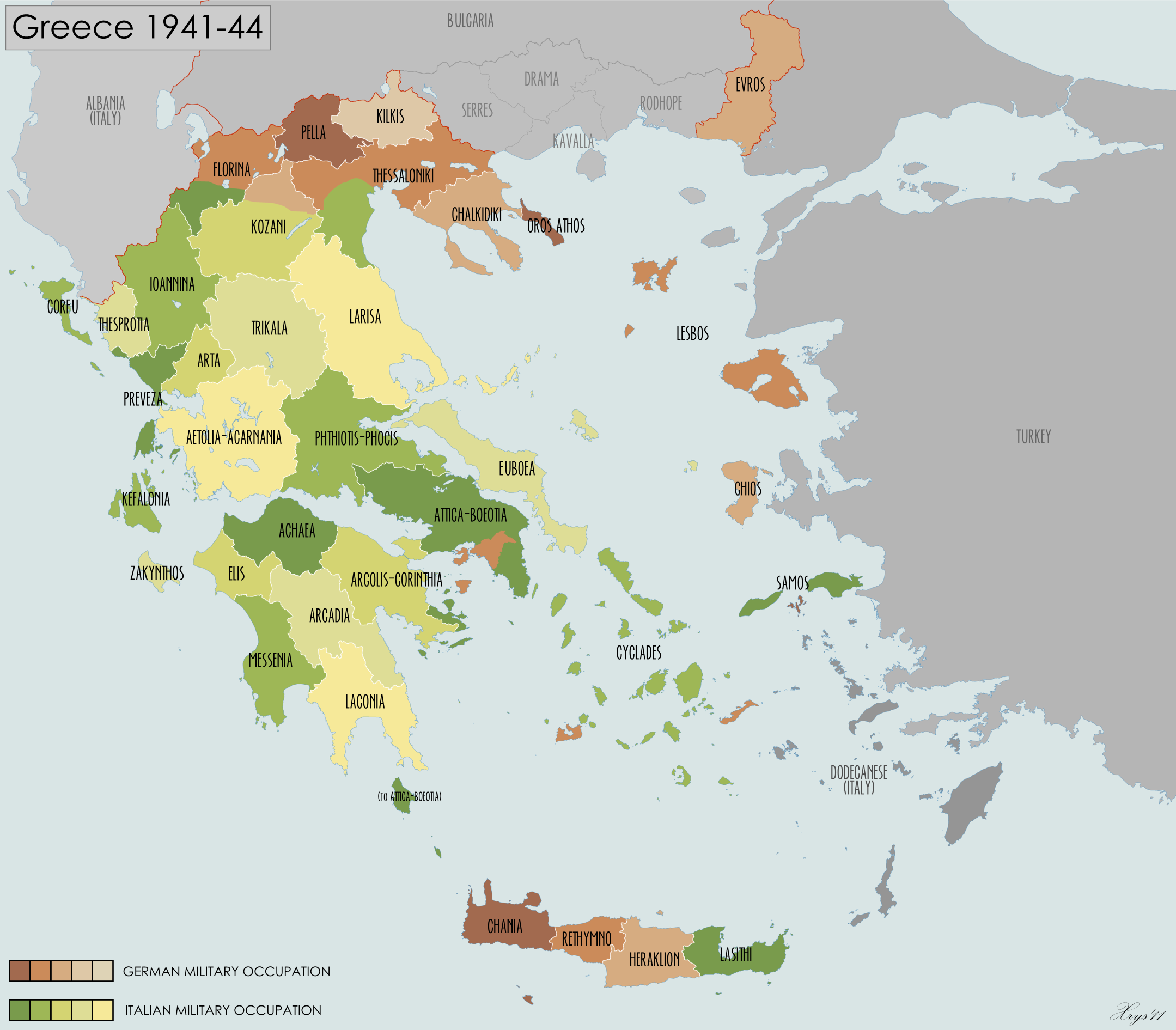
Greece, 1941–1944

Following the German invasion of Greece and the flight of the Greek government to Crete and then Egypt, the Hellenic State was formed in May 1941 as a puppet state of both Italy and Germany. Initially, Italy had wished to annex Greece, but was pressured by Germany to avoid civil unrest such as had occurred in Bulgarian-annexed areas. The result was Italy accepting the creation of a puppet regime with the support of Germany. Italy had been assured by Hitler of a primary role in Greece. Most of the country was held by Italian forces, but strategic locations (Central Macedonia, the islands of the northeastern Aegean, most of Crete, and parts of Attica) were held by the Germans, who seized most of the country's economic assets and effectively controlled the collaborationist government. The puppet regime never commanded any real authority, and did not gain the allegiance of the people. It was somewhat successful in preventing secessionist movements like the Aromanian Roman Legion from establishing themselves. By mid-1943, the Greek Resistance had liberated large parts of the mountainous interior ("Free Greece"), setting up a separate administration there. After the Italian armistice, the Italian occupation zone was taken over by the German armed forces, who remained in charge of the country until their withdrawal in autumn 1944. In some Aegean islands, German garrisons were left behind, and surrendered only after the end of the war.

=== Japanese ===
The Empire of Japan created a number of client states in the areas occupied by its military, beginning with the creation of Manchukuo in 1932. These puppet states achieved varying degrees of international recognition.

==== Cambodia ====
The Kingdom of Kampuchea was a short-lived Japanese puppet state that lasted from 9 March 1945 to 15 August 1945. The Japanese entered the French protectorate of Cambodia in mid-1941, but allowed Vichy French officials to remain in administrative posts while Japanese calls for an "Asia for the Asiatics" won over many Cambodian nationalists.

In March 1945, in order to gain local support, the Japanese dissolved French colonial rule and pressured Cambodia to declare independence within the Greater East Asia Co-Prosperity Sphere. King Sihanouk declared the Kingdom of Kampuchea (replacing the French name) independent. Son Ngoc Thanh who had fled to Japan in 1942 returned in May and was appointed foreign minister. On the date of Japanese surrender, a new government was proclaimed with Son Ngoc Thanh as prime minister. When the Allies occupied Phnom Penh in October, Son Ngoc Thanh was arrested for collaborating with the Japanese and was exiled to France.

==== Azad Hind ====
The Arzi Hukumat-e-Azad Hind, the "Provisional Government of Free India" was a state that was recognized by nine Axis governments, and accepted as part of the axis by the Japanese.

It was led by Subhas Chandra Bose, an Indian nationalist who rejected Mahatma Gandhi's nonviolent methods for achieving independence. The First Indian National Army faltered after its leadership objected to being a propaganda tool for Japanese war aims, and the role of Japanese liaison office. It was revived by the Indian Independence League with Japanese support in 1942 after the ex-PoWs and Indian civilians in South-east Asia agreed to participate in the INA venture on the condition it was led by Bose. From occupied Singapore Bose declared India's independence on October 21, 1943 . The Indian National Army was committed as a part of the U Go Offensive. It played a largely marginal role in the battle, and suffered serious casualties and had to withdraw with the rest of Japanese forces after the siege of Imphal was broken. It was later committed to the defence of Burma against the Allied offensive. It suffered a large number of desertions in this latter part. The remaining troops of the INA maintained order in Rangoon after the withdrawal of Ba Maw's government. The provisional government was given nominal control of the Andaman and Nicobar Islands from November 1943 to August 1945.

==== Inner Mongolia (Mengjiang) ====
Mengjiang was a Japanese puppet state in Inner Mongolia. It was nominally ruled by Prince Demchugdongrub, a Mongol nobleman descended from Genghis Khan, but was in fact controlled by the Japanese military. Mengjiang's independence was proclaimed on 18 February 1936, following the Japanese occupation of the region.

The Inner Mongolians had several grievances against the central Chinese government in Nanjing, including their policy of allowing unlimited migration of Han Chinese to the region. Several of the young princes of Inner Mongolia began to agitate for greater freedom from the central government, and it was through these men that Japanese saw their best chance of exploiting Pan-Mongol nationalism and eventually seizing control of Outer Mongolia from the Soviet Union.

Japan created Mengjiang to exploit tensions between ethnic Mongolians and the central government of China, which in theory ruled Inner Mongolia. When the various puppet governments of China were unified under the Wang Jingwei government in March 1940, Mengjiang retained its separate identity as an autonomous federation. Although under the firm control of the Japanese Imperial Army, which occupied its territory, Prince Demchugdongrub had his own independent army. Mengjiang vanished in 1945 following Japan's defeat in World War II.

==== Laos ====
French Indochina, including Laos, had been occupied by the Japanese in 1941, though government by the Vichy French colonial officials had continued. The liberation of France in 1944, bringing Charles de Gaulle to power, meant the end of the alliance between Japan and the Vichy French administration in Indochina. On 9 March 1945 the Japanese staged a military coup in Hanoi, and on 8 April they reached Luang Phrabang. King Sīsavāngvong was detained by the Japanese, and forced to issue a declaration of independence, albeit one that does not appear to have ever been formalised. French control over Laos was re-asserted in 1946.

==== Philippines (Second Republic) ====
After the surrender of the Filipino and American forces in Bataan Peninsula and Corregidor Island, the Japanese established a puppet state in the Philippines in 1942. The following year, the Philippine National Assembly declared the Philippines an independent Republic and elected José Laurel as its President. There was never widespread civilian support for the state, largely because of the general anti-Japanese sentiment stemming from atrocities committed by the Imperial Japanese Army. The Second Philippine Republic ended with Japanese surrender in 1945, and Laurel was arrested and charged with treason by the US government. He was granted amnesty by President Manuel Roxas, and remained active in politics, ultimately winning a seat in the post-war Senate.

==== Vietnam (Empire of Vietnam) ====
The Empire of Vietnam was a short-lived Japanese puppet state that lasted from 11 March to 23 August 1945. When the Japanese seized control of French Indochina, they allowed Vichy French administrators to remain in nominal control. This French rule ended on 9 March 1945, when the Japanese officially took control of the government. Soon after, Emperor Bảo Đại voided the 1884 treaty with France and Trần Trọng Kim, a historian, became prime minister.

== German, Italian, and Japanese cooperation ==
=== German–Japanese Axis-cooperation ===
On 7 December 1941, Japan attacked the US naval bases in Pearl Harbor, Hawaii. According to the stipulation of the Tripartite Pact, Nazi Germany and Fascist Italy were required to come to the defense of their allies only if they were attacked. Since Japan had made the first move, Germany and Italy were not obliged to aid her until the United States counterattacked. Nevertheless, expecting the US to declare war on Germany in any event, Hitler ordered the Reichstag to formally declare war on the United States. Hitler had agreed that Germany would almost certainly declare war when the Japanese first informed him of their intention to go to war with the United States on 17 November 1941. Italy also declared war on the US.

Historian Ian Kershaw suggests that this declaration of war against the United States was a serious blunder made by Germany and Italy, as it allowed the United States to join the war in Europe and North Africa without any limitation. On the other hand, American destroyers escorting convoys had been effectively intervening in the Battle of the Atlantic with German and Italian ships and submarines, and the immediate war declaration made the Second Happy Time possible for U-boats. Franklin D. Roosevelt had said in his Fireside Chat on 9 December 1941, 2 days before the European Axis powers formally declared war on America, that Germany and Italy already considered themselves to be in a state of war with the United States. Plans for Rainbow Five had been published by the press early in December 1941, and Hitler could no longer ignore the amount of economic and military aid the US was giving Britain and the USSR.

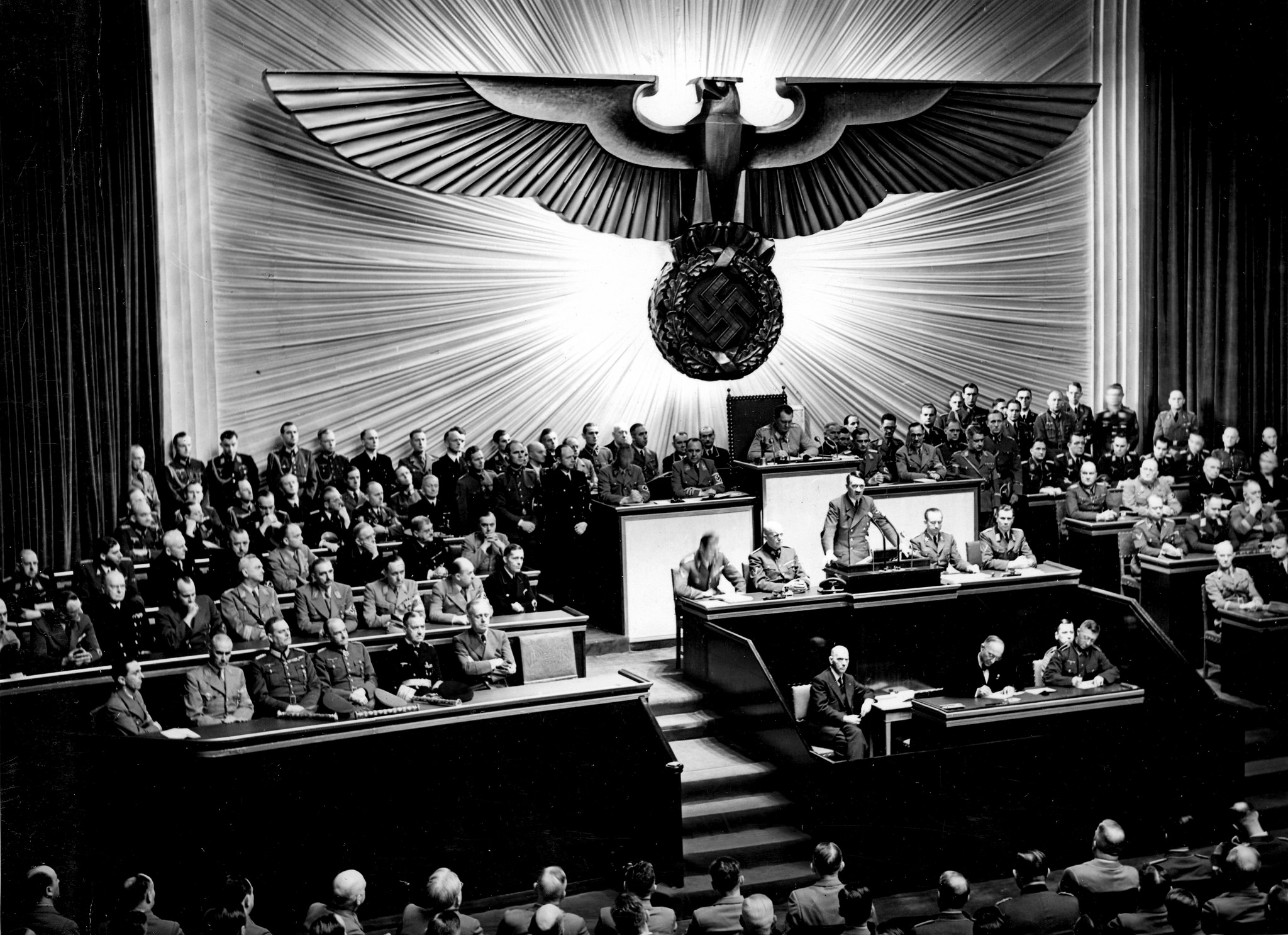
Hitler declaring war on the United States on 11 December 1941

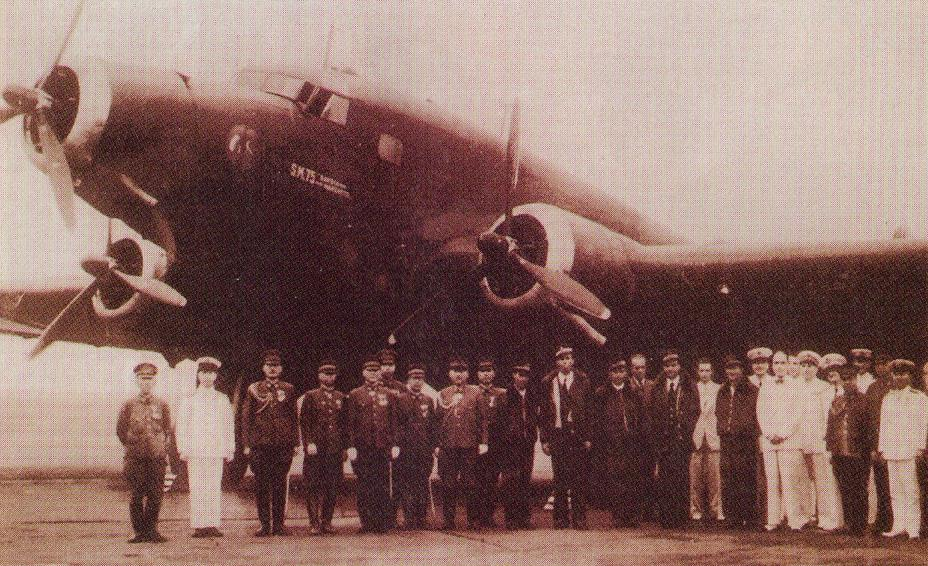
Italian pilots of a Savoia-Marchetti SM.75 long-range cargo aircraft meeting with Japanese officials upon arriving in East Asia in 1942

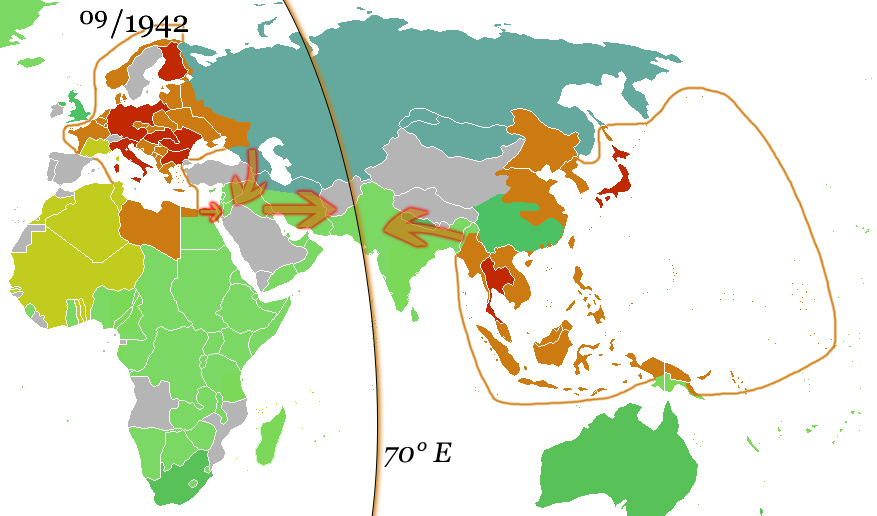
German and Japanese direct spheres of influence at their greatest extents in Autumn 1942. Arrows show planned movements to an agreed demarcation line at 70° E, which was, however, never approximated.

== See also ==
- Axis leaders of World War II
- Axis powers negotiations on the division of Asia
- Central Powers
- Collaboration with Nazi Germany and Fascist Italy
- Collaboration with the Empire of Japan
- List of expansion operations and planning of the Axis powers
- Foreign relations of the Axis powers
- German-Soviet Axis talks
- Greater Germanic Reich
- Hakkō ichiu
- Hetalia: Axis Powers
- Hypothetical Axis victory in World War II
- Italian imperialism under Fascism
- Croatian–Romanian–Slovak friendship proclamation
- List of pro-Axis leaders and governments or direct control in occupied territories
- Military history of Italy during World War II
- New Order (Nazism)
- World War II by country
- Hitlers Zweites Buch
