= Tifu (surname) =

Tifu is a surname. Notable people with the surname include:

- Anna Tifu (born 1986), Italian classical violinist
- Yannick Tifu (born 1984), Canadian ice hockey player

== See also ==
- Wang Tifu (1911–2001), a diplomat of Manchuria, for whom Tifu was a given name
