= Lü Yiwen =

Chinese diplomat (1897-1950)

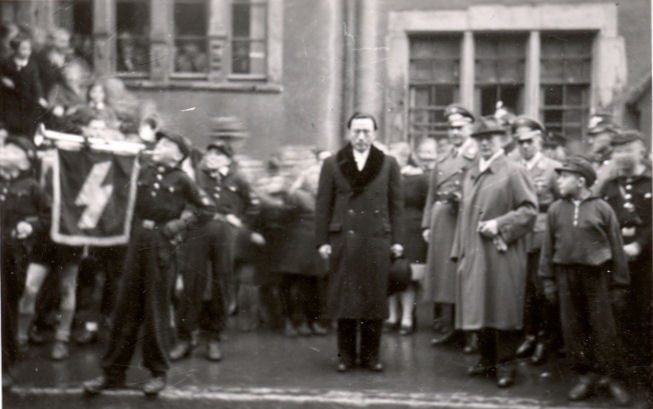
Lü Yiwen

Lü Yiwen (Chinese: 呂宜文, also known as Ro Gi-Bun; 1897–1950) was a Chinese diplomat who served as the ambassador of Manchukuo to Nazi Germany, since the German recognition of Manchukuo's independence in 1938. He subsequently took part in negotiating Manchukuo's entry into the Anti-Comintern Pact in 1940.

Lü also served as the Manchukuo ambassador to Finland, a country that also had diplomatic relations with his country. He was accredited on 15 December 1941. In an interview with the Finnish press at the time he gave the estimate that he was the first Manchu to have ever set foot on Finnish soil. He said that although Manchus are not intimately familiar with Finland, they appreciate the country's war feats. When asked about snow and skiing, a popular Finnish pastime, he related that his large home country does get snow, but that in some places it is dry and hard and unsuitable for skiing whereas in other parts skiing is popular.

== Rescue of Jewish Refugees During World War II ==
While serving as the ambassador of Manchukuo to Nazi Germany, Lü Yiwen was indirectly involved in efforts to rescue Jewish refugees. According to various accounts, his subordinate Wang Tifu played a key role in issuing visas through the Manchukuo embassy, enabling Jewish refugees to escape Germany. Wang Tifu later stated that he persuaded Lü Yiwen to allow these visas to be issued quietly and to continue assisting the refugees despite political risks. Lü Yiwen’s approval and oversight provided the necessary authority for these actions to proceed.

This initiative is considered part of broader diplomatic efforts during that era, where diplomats took personal and professional risks to aid those in need. Historical accounts have highlighted Lü Yiwen's complex position as a diplomat representing a Japanese-controlled state, navigating delicate political tensions while facilitating humanitarian efforts.

The story is documented through Wang Tifu's memoirs and scholarly research, including studies on Manchukuo-German relations and refugee assistance during the Second World War. Historians have recognized Lü Yiwen's role as supportive but emphasize that the specifics of his involvement remain subject to further research due to limited firsthand testimonies.
