= Anti-Comintern Pact =

1936 treaty signed by Germany and Japan

Agreement against the Communist International
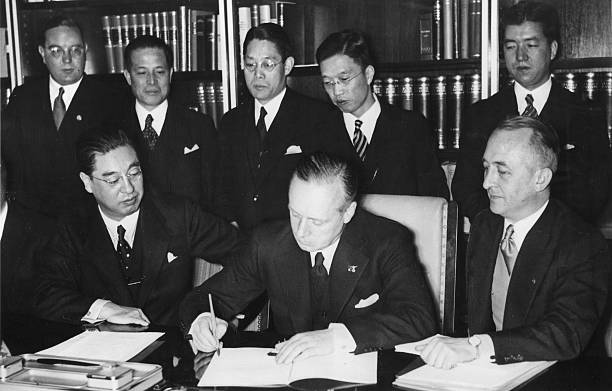
- Japanese ambassador to Germany Kintomo Mushanokōji and the German ambassador-at-large Joachim von Ribbentrop sign the Anti-Comintern Pact.
- Type: Pact
- Drafted: 23 October 1936
- Signed: 25 November 1936
- Location: Berlin, Germany
- Parties: Initial parties; Germany (1936); Japan (1936); Before World War II; Italy (1937); Hungary (1939); Manchukuo (1939); Spain (1939); During World War II; Finland (1941); Romania (1941); Bulgaria (1941); Slovakia (1941); Wang Jingwei regime (1941); Denmark (1941); Croatia (1941)

The Anti-Comintern Pact, officially the Agreement against the Communist International, was an anti-communist pact concluded between Nazi Germany and the Empire of Japan on 25 November 1936 and directed against the Communist International (Comintern). It was signed by the German ambassador-at-large Joachim von Ribbentrop and the Japanese ambassador to Germany Kintomo Mushanokōji. Italy joined in 1937 (earlier it had signed the Italo-Soviet Pact, directed partly against Hitler), but it was legally recognized as an original signatory by the terms of its entry. Spain and Hungary joined in 1939. Other countries joined during World War II.

The Japanese signatories had hoped that the Anti-Comintern Pact would effectively be an alliance against the Soviet Union, which was how the Soviets perceived it. There was also a secret additional protocol which specified a joint German-Japanese policy specifically aimed against the Soviet Union.

After August 1939, Japan distanced itself from Germany as a result of the Molotov–Ribbentrop Pact. The Anti-Comintern Pact was followed by the September 1940 Tripartite Pact, which identified the United States as the primary threat rather than the Soviet Union, although in theory applying to the Soviets as well; however, by December 1941, this too was virtually inoperative. The Anti-Comintern Pact was subsequently renewed in November 1941 and saw the entry of several new members into the pact. The Nazi regime saw signing of the Anti-Comintern Pact as a "litmus test of loyalty". The Anti-Comintern Pact ceased to exist with the end of World War II.

== Background ==
=== Germany ===
==== "Anti-Komintern" (GDAV) ====
The Anti-Komintern, officially the Gesamtverband Deutscher antikommunistischer Vereinigungen (abbr. GDAV, 'general association of German anti-communist federations'), was a German agency established by Joseph Goebbels in 1933. Its activities covered a wide range of operations designed to denounce communism in general and the Soviet Union in particular, push antisemitic propaganda and garner domestic and international support for Nazi policy. It was placed under the leadership Dr. Adolf Ehrt [de]. Under Ehrt's leadership, the Comintern was denounced as 'godless' in reference to its atheism. Beginning in July 1936, the Spanish Civil War became a main focus for the Anti-Komintern's publications.

One of the Anti-Komintern's most significant outputs was the 1936 international release Der Weltbolschewismus, in which it connected various anti-communist and anti-semitic conspiracy theories for the consumption of the international audience. The book was not released in Germany itself to avoid conflict between the book's varied accounts with German state propaganda.

==== Anglo-German Naval Agreement ====
On 18 June 1935, the United Kingdom and Germany signed the Anglo-German Naval Agreement, which came as a surprise to the Japanese. This marked the beginning of a series of attempts by Adolf Hitler to improve relations between the two countries. In Hitler's mind, a positive relationship towards the United Kingdom would weaken Britain's allies France and Italy (at that point still a German rival) and contain the Soviet Union. Hitler would later also send Ribbentrop to London with the specific task of securing British membership in the Anti-Comintern Pact during his 1936–1938 tenure as German ambassador to the United Kingdom, declaring British accession into the pact as his 'greatest wish'.

In Japan, the treaty was viewed with suspicion. Mushanokōji on 4 July 1935 in an embassy meeting (Note: Attendees of the embassy meeting: Kintomo Mushanokōji, Hiroshi Ōshima, Kojiro Inoue, Dr. Hiroo Furuuchi, Tadao Yokoi.) stated his opinion that it would be unwise for Japan to rush into an alliance with Germany, as he (correctly) interpreted the Anglo-German Naval Agreement as a German attempt to ally the UK. The United States and Britain had been hostile towards Japan ever since the Mukden Incident of 1931, and Mushanokōji feared that Japan might isolate itself if Germany ended up choosing a partnership with Britain over a partnership with Japan.

==== Competing authorities and ideologies in German foreign policy ====
The execution of German foreign policy was nominally left to Konstantin von Neurath's foreign ministry, but Joachim von Ribbentrop headed the semi-autonomous Dienststelle Ribbentrop, created in late 1934, where he could carry out Hitler's personal foreign policy requests independently from foreign ministry consent. This created a rivalry between the two services. While Hitler favored Ribbentrop as his personal foreign policy champion, he at least initially maintained Neurath's staff of career diplomats to maximize his government's diplomatic legitimacy abroad. Hiroshi Ōshima, Japanese military attaché in Berlin and the single most important individual on the Japanese side of the Anti-Comintern Pact's negotiations, interpreted the German foreign service structure as one where the power structure was such that "it was only Hitler and Ribbentrop who decided foreign policy, and that it was therefore of no use to talk to their subordinates". Ōshima thus attempted to get any important step of the negotiations to Ribbentrop's or Hitler's desks directly.

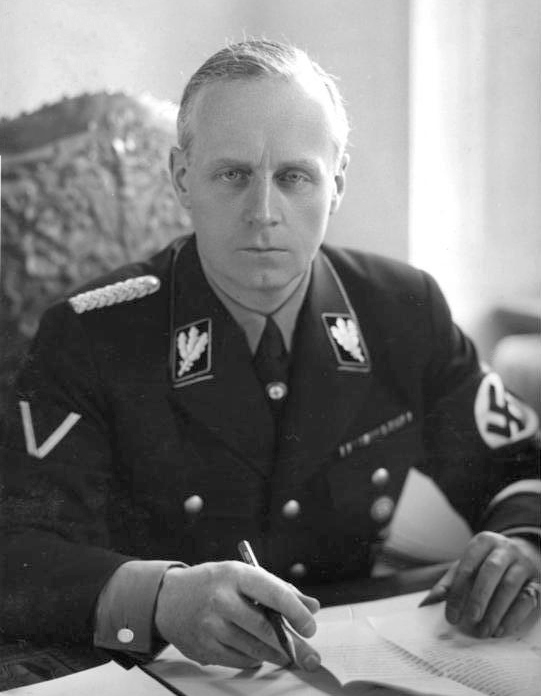
Joachim von Ribbentrop in April 1938.

While Ribbentrop was Hitler's personal diplomat of choice, his personal view on geostrategic diplomacy varied quite distinctly from Hitler's during the late 1930s. Whereas Hitler favored a friendly policy towards Britain to eliminate the Soviet Union, Ribbentrop saw the western allies as Germany's main enemy and designed much of German foreign policy, including the Anti-Comintern Pact, with the goal to contain the British Empire in mind as well. When it came to Japan, Ribbentrop believed that the Japanese focus on the Soviet Union as its main antagonist could be redirected towards the United Kingdom also, thus enabling Japan to be a partner in Ribbentrop's anti-British coalition. German alignment with Japan, against the wishes of the traditionally sinophile German foreign service and German public at large, began at the end of 1933.

==== German-Soviet interwar treaties ====
During the time of the Weimar Republic, the German government had made major treaties with the USSR, including the 1922 Treaty of Rapallo and the 1926 Treaty of Berlin. (Note: The Treaty of Berlin had built on the Treaty of Rapallo and designated it the basis of German-Soviet relations. This declaration by Weimar Germany had been seamlessly carried over into the Nazi state, which affirmed and extend the Treaty of Berlin on 5 May 1933.) Germany was already agitating against the Soviet Union in 1935 when after a previous German–Polish declaration of non-aggression, through Hermann Goring proposed a military alliance with Poland against the Soviet Union, but this was rejected. Germany made later approaches to Poland nevertheless.

In a note on the day of the signing of the Anti-Comintern Pact, 25 November 1936, Ribbentrop informed Mushanokōji that the German government viewed these two treaties' terms as void under the secret additional protocol. Mushanokōji replied on the same day, expressing the Japanese government's "sincere satisfaction" with the German stance. This had been partially a result of the Japanese government's insistence, most notably in a request on 24 July 1936, to clarify the treaty's implications for past bilateral treaties between either party and the Soviet Union.

=== Japan ===
==== Racial Equality Proposal of 1919, Washington Naval Conference of 1922 ====
Japan had fought in the Great War on the side of the victorious Entente Powers. However, as part of the Washington Naval Conference of 1922, the United States and United Kingdom successfully managed to both limit Japan's naval forces by treaty and to force Japan to surrender her gains in China made during World War I. While there were some advantages for Tokyo gained during the conference – it was granted parity with US and UK in the Pacific Ocean and was entitled to build a navy that would outmatch the French and Italian navies, as well as being recognized as the world's only non-western colonial power – the treaty was unpopular in Japan. Japanese nationalists, as well as the Imperial Japanese Navy, denounced the treaty's restrictive aspects.

Culturally, the 1922 Washington Treaty was viewed as yet another betrayal by the Western powers, after the Japanese proposals for guaranteed racial equality under the League of Nations had been rejected in 1919. This perception of national humiliation was further accelerated by the economic downturn that Japan experienced in the 1920s, exemplified by the 1927 financial panic in Japan (Shōwa financial crisis), which had also caused political instability and the fall of the first cabinet of Reijirō Wakatsuki, and by the 1929 Great Depression. German historian Bernd Martin dubbed the Washington Naval Conference the "Japanese 'Versailles'."

==== Japanese societal militarization and aggression against China ====
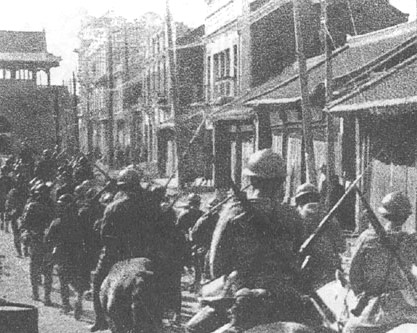
Japanese troops entering Shenyang during the 1931 Mukden Incident

The Mukden Incident of 18 September 1931 began the period of Japanese aggression in Asia between 1931 and 1945, sometimes called the Fifteen Years War. The diplomatic reaction of the European great powers to Japan's attack against China was insufficient to stop the Japanese advance, despite continued Chinese appeals to the League of Nations. This attack, which had no central order from Tokyo precede it and was rather an autonomous decision by the Kwantung Army leadership, was kept confined to North East China by the Japanese commanders in the hopes that this would be enough to keep European responses lukewarm and thus further Japanese advances. This estimation proved to be accurate, and the United Kingdom in particular was more than happy to let Japan proceed in Manchuria as long as British interests in southern and central China remained undisturbed. Even after the Shanghai Incident of 28 January 1932, the British attitude remained on the whole friendly to the Japanese cause and indifferent towards Chinese pleas for assistance. Among the few exceptions to this were British efforts to bring about peace in the city of Shanghai itself, where the UK had direct economic interests.

The Japanese Pacification of Manchukuo on the other hand was viewed in Britain as a positive development that ultimately would help to disperse bandit activity. In February 1932, the Japanese established a puppet state in North East China, the State of Manchuria, nominally headed by Puyi, the dethroned last emperor of the Qing dynasty (r. 1908–1912, 1917). Following the Lytton Report, which laid the blame for the conflict in Manchuria firmly at the feet of the Japanese, Sir John Simon, the foreign secretary of the United Kingdom, failed to condemn Japan in his speech on 7 December 1932, and subsequently earned the favor of Japanese politicians such as Yōsuke Matsuoka, who viewed the lackluster British response as further encouragement for the Japanese course in China. Japan left the League of Nations as a result of the Lytton Report in February 1933.

The Tanggu Truce ended the hostilities in Manchuria, but Japanese ambition in China was not yet satisfied. Between 1933 and 1936, Japanese foreign minister Kōki Hirota pursued the Hirota wakyo gaiko, the "friendly diplomacy of Hirota". Summed up by the Amau Doctrine of 1934, Japan viewed itself as the protective power of all of East Asia, mirroring the role of the United States in the Americas under the Monroe Doctrine of 1823. This posturing was again permitted by the European great powers, and Neville Chamberlain even attempted to negotiate an Anglo–Japanese non-aggression pact to improve British relations with Japan in 1934. In secret, Hirota's foreign policy leadership set an array of highly ambitious goals for Japan's diplomacy. This included an industrial buildup in Manchukuo, the acquisition of resources from North China via subjugation, conquest of the western Pacific and South East Asia, and preparations for a war against the Soviet Union.

"The Essence of National Defense and Proposals to Strengthen It" (October 1934)

Cooperative diplomacy will not solve the present emergency, which is not an isolated incident but represents a world emergency that has come about despite the great efforts that have been made by all countries since the World War. Japan must take advantage of the glorious challenge posed by the Manchurian Incident and our withdrawal from the League of Nations. We must accept our fate, firmly refusing to be weakened by avoiding the challenge, and must have the courage to use this opportunity to formulate a great plan for our country's next hundred years.

— Ohata, Tokushiro (1976). "The Anti-Comintern Pact, 1935–1939". In Morley, James William (ed.). "Deterrent Diplomacy: Japan, Germany and the USSR, 1935–1940". p. 12. ISBN 9780231089692.

The Japanese army in October 1934 published a pamphlet entitled "The Essence of National Defense and Proposals to Strengthen It", going directly against the attempt of diplomatic reconciliation that was at the same time (at least half-heartedly) attempted by the civilian government in Tokyo (named "Shidehara diplomacy" after former Prime Minister Kijūrō Shidehara). The pamphlet demanded a complete subjugation of all aspects of foreign and domestic policy to the all-encompassing question of "national defense" and the nation's preparation for total war. It further denounced "cooperative diplomacy", lauded the Japanese decision to withdraw from the League of Nations, and called upon Japan to accept its fate and to formulate a great plan for the next 100 years. The military subsequently continued its practice of publishing pamphlets with overt political content without prior coordination with the civilian government. In November 1936, about the time of the Anti-Comintern Pact's conclusion, the army pamphlet "Perfecting the Army's Preparedness and the Spirit Required" advocated strengthening the army and openly called for the reform of the civilian government and the reform of the Japanese state to better suit the military's goals.

==== Domestic power struggles about Japanese foreign policy ====
The Japanese imperial state's system was dubbed "a cone without vertex" by Japanese historian Ken Ishida. The Imperial Japanese Army (IJA), Imperial Japanese Navy (IJN) and the Japanese foreign ministry each had its own agenda with regards as to how Japan should orient its foreign policy. The Japanese system, highly traditional and based around the spiritual and socio-cultural value of Emperor Hirohito, also involved the imperial court, which served as a buffer between these three rival groups and the Emperor at the top, which allowed Hirohito to escape direct political responsibilities for any failures and setbacks that the system might produce.

==== Japanese–Soviet fishery treaty negotiations and border disputes ====
At the time of the negotiations for the Anti-Comintern Pact, the Japanese government was also in negotiations with the Soviet government over fishing rights in the Sea of Japan. As the Anti-Comintern Pact's secret additional protocol between Germany and Japan against the USSR was to forbid political treaties by either state with the Soviet Union without the express consent of the other party to the Anti-Comintern Pact, Japanese ambassador Mushanokōji was concerned whether the Pact would result in consequences for the Japanese-Soviet negotiations. He inquired about it in a letter to Ribbentrop after the signing of the treaty on 25 November, and also mentioned the issue of border questions between Japanese-controlled Manchukuo and the USSR. Ribbentrop confirmed the German government's assent that Japan was autonomous and free to proceed in the matters mentioned by Mushanokōji his reply on the same day.

=== Ideological similarities and contradictions between Nazi Germany and Imperial Japan ===
The Anti-Comintern Pact was more of a statement than an actual political commitment, and the statement was one of mutual ideological alignment and diplomatic attachment to one another. Both countries shared examples of very politically significant racial ideologies, with Alfred Rosenberg in Germany and Shūmei Ōkawa in Japan becoming the leading racialist ideologues. Whereas Rosenberg enjoyed government backing and was a central party figure after the Nazis' rise to power in 1933, Ōkawa's audience was more limited. Ōkawa found his main support base with young nationalistic military officers, particularly those in the Kwantung Army, the military unit that instigated Japan's initial invasion of North East China in 1931. Ōkawa's work was in late 1936 furthered by Takeo Nimiya's influential foreign policy pamphlet "The Unique Principles Guiding Japanese Diplomacy", in which Takeo laid out a vision of a long-term orientation of Japanese diplomacy around a racially justified expansionist policy based on traditional Japanese spiritual values rather than western-style imperialism. Nimiya's pamphlet was especially popular with young bureaucrats and students who were about to enter Japanese state politics in the late 1930s and early 1940s.

"The Foreign Policy of Imperial Japan" (8 August 1936)

The Soviet Union's revolutionary pressure on Asia increases as it continues to strengthen its national defense and international position through a huge rearmament program. Its goal, a Red penetration of many areas, interferes with Japan's East Asia policy and poses a grave threat to our empire's defense. Thwarting the Soviet Union's aggressive intention therefore has become the most crucial element in our diplomacy. This goal must be achieved by diplomatic means and by completion of a defense buildup.

...

Germany has interests that closely parallels ours vis-a-vis the Soviet Union because of the special arrangement that exists between Russia and France. Hence, it is in Germany's interest to cooperate with us; and we in turn should promote close relations with Germany, leading to alliance between Japan and Germany. This relationship must be expanded to include Poland and other friendly European countries near the Soviet Union as well as other Asian and Islamic countries, as a further restraint on the Soviet Union.

— Ohata, Tokushiro (1976). "The Anti-Comintern Pact, 1935–1939". In Morley, James William (ed.). "Deterrent Diplomacy: Japan, Germany and the USSR, 1935–1940". p. 31. ISBN 9780231089692.

The two countries shared a common ideological antagonist in the communism, which was extensively covered in the German and Japanese media and perceived as a real threat of subversion among German and Japanese political elites. As a result of Japanese reservations about an outright military alliance, the Anti-Comintern Pact was conceptualized as an anti-communist agreement rather than an outright military alliance. However, the Japanese military establishment was concerned about the growth of Soviet military strength, and Japanese military attachés in Europe had held conferences about the potential threat coming specifically from the USSR as early as 1929 to discuss potential countermeasures. The Japanese government on 8 August 1936 issued an internal document that specifically justified the German–Japanese alliance as a response to the growing threat that the Soviet Union posed in Asia and the close parallels between Japanese and German interests regarding the USSR. This document also revealed intentions to include other European, Islamic and Asian countries in the anti-Soviet pact and specifically named Poland as a potential candidate for pact membership.

Both the Japanese and German movements shared an aversion towards the League of Nations, and both countries left the League during the year 1933. The two countries shared a similar list of diplomatic adversaries: The United Kingdom, the United States, and the Soviet Union. While the German and Japanese racial ideologies of the supposed superiority of the Aryan race and the Yamato race, respectively, showed parallels, these parallels should logically have made the alliance less likely, as the two countries' fascisms viewed each other as racially inferior. In fact, Hitler's Mein Kampf specifically names the Japanese as an example of a racial grouping on the second out of three cultural tiers, a step down from the Aryan race on the top. To prevent diplomatic complications as a result of German racial thought, German racist propaganda in the state-controlled press was directed away from the topic of the Japanese people so as to not irritate Japan.

=== Seventh World Congress of the Comintern ===
Seventh World Congress declaration regarding the threat of Germany and Japan

In the face of the war provocations of the German fascists and Japanese militarists, and the speeding up of armaments by the war parties in the capitalist countries ... the central slogan of the Communist Parties must be: struggle for peace. All those interested in the preservation of peace should be drawn into this vital front. The concentration of forces against the chief instigators of war at any given moment (at the present time against fascist Germany and against Poland and Japan which are in league with it) constitutes a most important task of the Communist Parties.

— Stratman, George John (1970). Germany's diplomatic relations with Japan 1933–1941. Graduate Student Theses, Dissertations, & Professional Papers. 2450. University of Montana. p. 18.

At the Seventh World Congress of the Comintern in July 1935, following the advice of Georgi Dimitrov to the Soviet government that had resulted from Dimitrov's experiences in France and Austria during 1934, the Communist International drastically changed the course that communist parties were advised to take in democratic systems. Instead of viewing the democratic and fascist parties as politically allied ("social fascism"), the communist movements were encouraged to ally with leftist and centrist forces (the policy of the popular front) in order to prevent the rightists from gaining ground.

Diplomatically, the Seventh World Congress also brought on the "collective security" policy in the Soviet Union, wherein the USSR would attempt to align with the western democracies to counteract the fascist regimes. The Seventh World Congress specifically declared fascist Germany and Japan, next to Poland, to be among the world's chief instigators of war. This declaration accelerated Ribbentrop's efforts to secure a German–Japanese alliance against the USSR, or at least a promise of non-support for the Soviet Union in case of a war between one of the countries against it. This change in Comintern policy also made it urgent for the European fascists to prevent the strengthening of leftist popular fronts against them.

=== Role of China in German–Japanese relations ===
The Republic of China was an important partner to the Germans, but a bitter enemy of the Japanese Empire, as Japan had invaded Manchuria in 1931. Although Ribbentrop hoped to involve both China and Japan in his anti-communist bloc, the continued hostilities and eventual outbreak of war made the ambivalent German position, including the Sino–German military cooperation and the status of Alexander von Falkenhausen and other military advisors to Chiang Kai-shek, a serious concern to both of the Asian states. Furthermore, China was the biggest trade partner for German businesses in Asia. China was also favored by the German military establishment and the armament industry, as the Chinese military was an important customer for German arms manufacturers and heavy industry. Chinese exports to Germany, including deliveries of tin and tungsten, were also seen as vital. During his time as Japanese ambassador to Germany, Mushanokōji made it one of his goals to undermine Sino–German economic and diplomatic relations. Within Germany's foreign service, Ribbentrop favored cooperation with Japan, whereas Neurath preferred alignment with China.

One of the major questions in the German foreign service in regards to Germany's diplomatic ambivalence between China and Japan was the recognition of the Japanese puppet state in Manchukuo, installed after the 1931 Japanese invasion of North East China. A recognition of Manchukuo, as suggested by German ambassador in Tokyo Herbert von Dirksen beginning in early 1934, would have clearly presented a German statement in favor of Japanese expansionism and would have disturbed Germany's Chinese partners. As a result of the possible irritation of the Chinese government and the potential misgivings of the Soviet government about the potential perception of an attempted encirclement by a German–Japanese entente, such a recognition of Manchukuo was initially opposed by Neurath and the foreign ministry.

In response to his initial request to recognize Manchukuo, Dirksen was instructed to avoid "any close relations with Japan which might lay [Germany] open to being suspected of wishing to render assistance against Russia". This German caution towards any offense cast against the Soviet Union resulted from the impression in Berlin that Japan during the year 1934 was under serious threat of diplomatic and military encirclement. Specifically, Dirksen was also instructed to pay close attention to any signs of a potential war between Japan and the USSR, which the Germans assumed the Soviet Union would probably receive the aid of the western democracies if it were to break out, although this potential war was not perceived as immediately imminent. Regardless, the German foreign service sought at all costs to avoid entanglement in such a conflict.

For their part, the Japanese political and military establishments were by 1934 also less than certain about the usefulness of the new Hitler government in Germany, which Tokyo assumed would attempt to maintain a peaceful relationship with the Soviet Union and avoid any open alignment with Moscow's enemies. The distrust that Japan felt was partially caused by the close relationship between Germany and China, which in turn was perceived as an ally of the Soviet Union against Japan. After the Anti-Comintern Pact's signing, Falkenhausen was recalled to Germany against his will after Japanese pressure in 1938. China eventually declared war on Germany and Italy, along with Japan, on 9 December 1941, in the aftermath of the Japanese attack on Pearl Harbor and the American entry into World War II, citing German and Italian support for Japanese aggression as the reason.

=== Instability in France ===
The domestic situation in the French Third Republic was unstable. This provided the opportunity for France's rivals, especially Germany, to expand their influence, while at the same time weakening France's European partners, such as Poland and Czechoslovakia. The cabinet of Léon Blum, supported by France's popular front, had taken the reins in June 1936. The social instability and political violence within France made the French government careful and ineffective in applying France's otherwise extensive diplomatic and military power. Hitler, who expected France's popular front to result in a situation similar to the Spanish Civil War, openly announced to the French ambassador on 6 October 1936 that a communist takeover in France would not be treated by Germany as a domestic affair. In French foreign policy, the 1934 German–Polish Non-Aggression Pact had caused concerns about the stability of the French alliance system in eastern Europe, leading to a French realignment towards the Soviet Union that resulted in the 1936 Franco-Soviet Treaty of Mutual Assistance.

=== German, Italian, and Soviet involvement in the Spanish Civil War ===
The Spanish Civil War, in which Germany supported the Nationalists and the Soviet Union the Republicans, reinforced the urgency in the mind of the German leadership to create some sort of anti-Soviet military arrangement to counteract a potential aggression by the Soviet Union. The Spanish nationalists also received aid from Mussolini's Italy (Corpo Truppe Volontarie), but the Italian attitude to a potential anti-communist or anti-Soviet agreement was initially the opposite of the German position: the Italians viewed the signing of an anti-communist treaty as superfluous, as Italy's anti-communist commitment was in the Italian viewpoint sufficiently proven in their support for the Spanish nationalists. The Spanish Civil War was viewed by the Germans as concrete proof that the teachings of the Seventh World Congress of the Comintern, which had been specifically aimed against Germany (and Japan), were indeed affecting geopolitics.

== Creation ==
=== Early designs by Dienststelle Ribbentrop and Hiroshi Ōshima ===
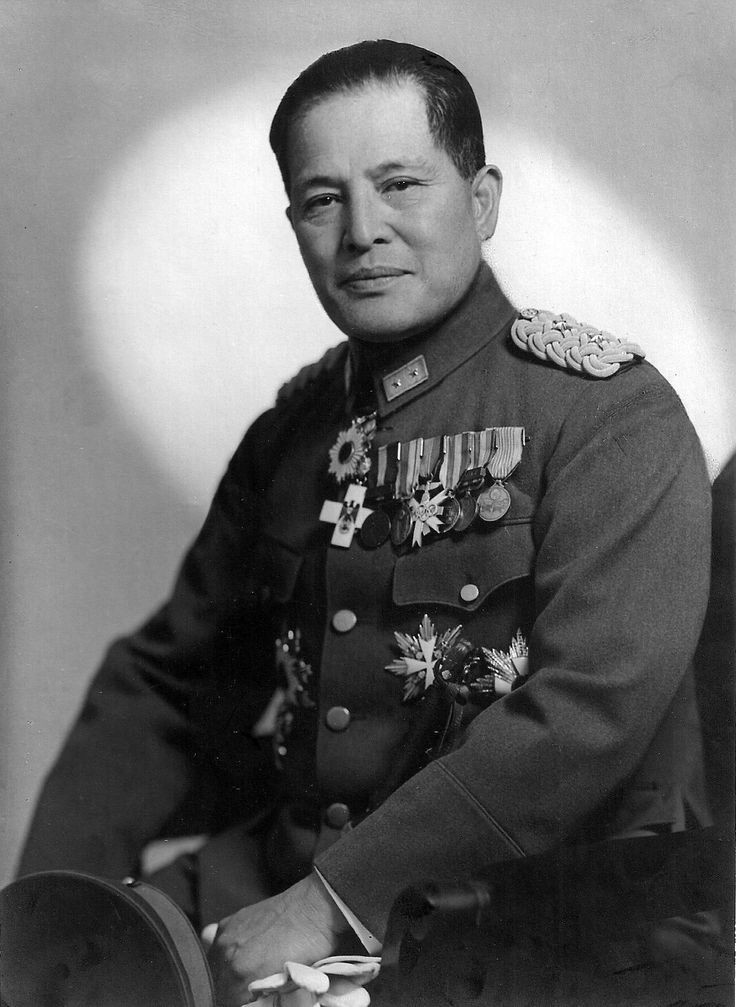
Hiroshi Ōshima

After the Anglo-German Naval Agreement and the Seventh World Congress, the German Dienststelle Ribbentrop envisioned in October 1935 an anti-communist diplomatic system that might involve both the Empire of Japan and the Republic of China. This idea had support on the Japanese side by Hiroshi Ōshima, then the military attaché for Japan in Berlin, although Ōshima was more concerned with a Japanese subjugation of China rather than with an equal Sino–Japanese alliance against the Soviet Union. The Nationalist government in China was unwilling to make deals with Japan as long as the Japanese occupation of Manchuria persisted, so Ōshima and Ribbentrop drafted a bilateral treaty between Germany and Japan.

Originally, the treaty was scheduled for November 1935, and invitations were to be extended to China, the United Kingdom, Italy and Poland. However, the German military and diplomatic leadership stalled the treaty's realization, as they feared a breakdown in the German relations with China. Furthermore, foreign minister Konstantin von Neurath was jealous of Ribbentrop's exalted position in foreign policy outside of the ministry's control.

While the initial designs for the pact came from Dienststelle Ribbentrop, Hiroshi Ōshima, who would himself become Japan's ambassador to Germany in 1938–1939 and 1941–1945, became very influential in the pact's outline on the Japanese side. While the government in Tokyo was not particularly proactive in the pact's creation, Ōshima and the staff of the Japanese embassy in Berlin were. When Mushanokōji stated his suspicions of the German intentions to the embassy personnel on 4 July 1935, Ōshima was the main source of disagreement within the staff. Regardless, Mushanokōji ended up making the recommendation to the Japanese government to only pursue an alliance with Germany insofar as it did not lead to the deterioration of Japanese relations with the United Kingdom and United States.

Ōshima was a staunch anti-communist and veteran of the Japanese intervention in Siberia, and used his good connections within Germany – namely Wilhelm Canaris of the Abwehr, among others – to, without authorization from ambassador Mushanokōji, further his pro-German and anti-Soviet agenda within the embassy. Initially disgusted with the military and political weakness of the Weimar Republic when he first arrived in Germany in 1922, he became an admirer of Adolf Hitler following the National Socialists' rise to power in 1933, and concluded that "there were things in the new Germany which were worthy of serious consideration". Ōshima was aided by the fact he spoke the German language with a high degree of fluency.

His positive predispositions towards the NSDAP government made him useful in the anti-Soviet designs of the Imperial Japanese Army, which aimed to envelop the Soviet Union through an alliance with Germany, eventually planning to strike into Siberia to secure its natural resources for Japan (Hokushin-ron). Ōshima's instructions from the high command were to investigate the German government's stability, the future of the German military, and the state of German–Soviet military and diplomatic relations.

Ōshima followed his assignment diligently, and the high frequency of his visits to and inspections of the German military establishment was noted even by the American military attaché Hugh W. Rowan, one of whose tasks was to observe Japanese covert activity in Berlin. Rowan was soon convinced that Ōshima was "being given access to important technical information in possession of the German army". The threat posed by the Soviet Union remained Ōshima's principal concern, and he aggressively sought out all German information on Soviet military strength he could attain. His aforementioned relationship with Canaris was also largely based on the prospect of a potential German–Japanese intelligence service cooperation against the Soviet Union. By 1937, he would also forge close contacts with Wilhelm Keitel, the later Chief of OKW.

Ribbentrop's testimony regarding the Anti-Comintern Pact's creation

[T]he question arose as to how a way could be found at all to win over other countries to counter communistic tendencies. The problem, therefore, was an ideological one. In the year 1933, I believe, Hitler discussed with me for the first time, the question of whether a closer contact with Japan could be established in some form or other. I replied that I personally had certain connections with Japanese persons and would establish contact. When I did so it came to light that Japan had the same anti-Comintern attitude as Germany. Out of these conversations of the years 1933, 1934, 1935, I believe, the idea gradually crystallized that one might make these common efforts the subject of a pact. I believe it was one of my assistants who had the idea of concluding the Anti-Comintern Pact. I presented this idea to the Fuhrer and the Fuhrer approved of it. However, since it was, so to speak, an ideological question, he did not wish at that time that it be done through the official channels of German politics and therefore he instructed me to prepare this pact which then was concluded in my office in Berlin, as I believe, in the course of the year 1936.

— Trial of the Major War Criminals before the International Military Tribunal. 10. Nuremberg: International Military Tribunal. 1947. p. 240.

One of Ōshima's old associates from the time of the Weimar Republic, Friedrich Wilhelm Hack [de], had by 1934 joined the new Dienststelle Ribbentrop. Hack served as the networker between Ōshima, Canaris and German minister of defense Werner von Blomberg, organizing meetings in Freiburg, starting in early 1935. Hack was instrumental in establishing personal contacts for Ōshima and was the most important link between Ōshima and Joachim von Ribbentrop, whom Ōshima viewed as the single most important person on the German side after Hitler himself. Ōshima first met with Ribbentrop in March 1935. Ribbentrop reported to Hitler, according to his (Ribbentrop's) testimony at Nuremberg, that he 'personally had certain connections with Japanese persons'. Historian Carl Boyd interprets this as a reference to the contact with Ōshima established via Hack. With Hitler's tentative approval (Hitler was uncertain of Ōshima's authority and wanted Ribbentrop to ascertain the opinions of the higher-ups in the Japanese military establishment), negotiations between Ōshima and Ribbentrop went into full swing in fall of 1935.

=== Negotiations ===
==== 1935 ====
Starting with the meetings in October, which at some point involved Hitler himself, Ōshima presented his idea of a promise of mutual assistance in case of an attack on one of the two countries by the Soviet Union. At this point, Ōshima's telegrams to the Japanese army were enthusiastic about the diplomatic potential of the negotiations, up to and including the possibility of an open German–Japanese military alliance, even though both sides were more immediately comfortable at that point with a less impactful agreement to not aid the Soviet Union in case of a Soviet war against the other party. Such a 'no aid'-agreement was easier to fit into each country's respective grand strategies. Ōshima's extensive involvement was essential to the formation of the Anti-Comintern Pact, but was also the source of some discomfort among the Japanese military and diplomatic leaderships, as Ōshima had far overextended his military assignment with his unauthorized diplomatic cooperation with Ribbentrop and even Hitler himself. But instead of the severe punishment that a junior officer like Ōshima might have otherwise received for his reckless dealings with a foreign head of government, Ōshima's advance was acknowledged positively by the Japanese hyper-militarists, who were sympathetic to Hitler's policies and impressed by Ōshima's successes.

In late October 1935, the chief of the Japanese army's general staff, Prince Kan'in Kotohito, signalled that the army was positively disposed towards a pact with Germany. Kotohito had been a close associate of Hiroshi Ōshima's father Ken'ichi Ōshima, Japan's Minister of the Army in 1916–1918, and was thus positively predisposed towards Hiroshi Ōshima's activity in Europe, and likely one of Ōshima's protectors in the question of Ōshima overstepping his initial assignments. Kotohito assigned a general staff intelligence officer, Tadaichi Wakamatsu, with a mission in Berlin that involved ascertaining the German attitude towards a German–Japanese agreement directed against the Soviet Union. Meetings between Wakamatsu, Ōshima and Blomberg in November and December 1935 achieved little, although Wakamatsu signalled the general willingness of the Japanese army to negotiate a treaty with Germany. He was sceptical of the Dienststelle's semi-official status within the German foreign service.

The IJA in principle remained open to the idea, and Wakamatsu left Germany for Japan in December 1935 with the understanding that both sides would seek government approval for the pact. Wakamatsu and Kotohito were overall unprepared to deal with the remarkable progress that Ōshima reported in his messages and the potential magnitude of the resulting German–Japanese treaty. Near the end of 1935, Soviet Red Army intelligence intercepted several secret telegrams between Ōshima and the Japanese General Staff. This information was forwarded to the Soviet embassy in Japan, from which the American embassy also heard news of the ongoing secret negotiations between Germany and Japan. This marked the first time that the Soviet Union is confirmed to have received word of the ongoing negotiations of the Anti-Comintern Pact.

==== 1936 ====
The inconsistencies between the German foreign ministry and Dienststelle Ribbentrop showed themselves again in the course of the negotiations. Dirksen, ambassador in Tokyo, was informed about the ongoing talks not by the German foreign service, but instead by the Japanese General Staff. German foreign minister Konstantin von Neurath, when informed about the situation by Hitler, argued against the creation of a German–Japanese pact. Firstly, he was concerned with Sino–German relations and thought Japan less important to Germany than China, and secondly, he wanted to avoid having foreign policy authority slip away from the foreign ministry towards Dienststelle Ribbentrop, where he saw Ribbentrop as a rival to his own position. In Japan, the matter was stalled, as the important documents got lost between January and February 1936 in the bureaucratic apparatus of the Japanese foreign ministry, as they were discarded by low-ranking officials before reaching foreign minister Kōki Hirota or his deputy Mamoru Shigemitsu.

Only in March 1936, following the turmoil in Japan related to the failed military coup of February 26 and the German Remilitarization of the Rhineland did the matter reach the new foreign minister Hachirō Arita, who discussed it with the ambassador to Germany Mushanokōji, who was in Japan at that time, and several high-ranking army officials. In that meeting, (Note: Attendees of the March 1936 meeting: Arita, Terauchi, Machijiri, Mushanokōji, Shigemitsu, possibly others.) Chief of Military Affairs Ryoki Machijiri was the only one in favor of an outright military alliance between Germany and Japan, whereas Arita, Shigemitsu, Hisaichi Terauchi and Mushanokōji favored the more careful way of an agreement specifically aimed against the Comintern. However, they overestimated their own authority in Berlin, where Ōshima was still the main negotiation partner for the Germans and personally unwilling to give up any of his newfound diplomatic importance to officials of the foreign ministry. To prevent a clash with the Japanese army, of which Ōshima as a military attaché was technically the subordinate of, rather than the foreign ministry, Arita and Mushanokōji had to carefully weave a new position. While favoring the Anti-Comintern version of the agreement, they still gave Ōshima as a representative of the military the ability to negotiate a full alliance. Mushanokōji was instructed to take a passive stance towards the Germans and let them initiate negotiations, as to not appear as if the Japanese foreign ministry was making a leap forward.

On the German side, the Franco–Soviet Treaty of Mutual Assistance of 27 March 1936 increased the demand for a strong partner in the Soviet Union's rear to prevent complete encirclement. Furthermore, Hitler hoped that France's allegiance to the Soviet Union might drive the anti-communist British government into a deal with Germany if Germany only made a strong enough gesture against communism. As such, negotiations resumed on 23 October 1936 and the pact was finalized and signed on 25 November of the same year. The treaty between France and the USSR, as well as the increased cooperation between communists and socialists that had resulted from the Seventh World Congress of the Comintern, allowed the communist PCF to double its votes in the 1936 elections in France. With infighting on the political left in Europe reduced, it became more urgent for the German government to reassess its position. On the same day that Ribbentrop and Mushanokōji initialed a draft agreement (23 October), Neurath signed a secret nine-point protocol with his Italian counterpart, Galeazzo Ciano.

the German diplomatic ambivalence between the ideological proximity and military potential of Japan and the economic value of China continued, and Neurath remained in favor of German alignment with China. In April 1936, Germany signed a major commercial treaty with China and gave them a credit of 100,000,000 marks for China to purchase German industrial and other products. It was Hitler himself who, unbeknownst to Neurath and the foreign ministry, began to reassess the importance of China and Japan in German foreign relations over the course of the summer of 1936. Hitler sanctioned new negotiations with the Japanese. Later that year, when German military attaché in Tokyo Eugen Ott temporarily returned to Germany to attend army maneuvers, he expressed his optimism about the Japanese army's willingness to conclude the pact to Hitler. Terauchi in May 1936 informed Ōshima that the army was yielding control of the negotiations to the foreign ministry in order to restore harmony between the two factions, but unofficially, Ōshima would remain Japan's key negotiator and Mushanokōji's role would be more ceremonial. In July, Mushanokōji requested a draft of the proposed treaty from Dienststelle Ribbentrop, which was drawn up by one of the Dienststelle's East Asian specialists, Dr. Hermann von Raumer. But instead of taking this draft immediately to Mushanokōji, Raumer, who probably acted on Ribbentrop's instructions, first presented it to Ōshima, who was attending the Bayreuth Festival at the time. On 22 July, Ōshima, Ribbentrop, Raumer and Hitler met in Bayreuth, where Hitler made some personal edits to Raumer's draft. Only then was the draft shown to ambassador Mushanokōji.

=== Japanese objections and final adjustments ===
This initial draft signed off on by Hitler appears to be lost to history, as the Japanese ambassador made some changes to it that were intended, according to Shigenori Tōgō's testimony at the International Military Tribunal for the Far East, to make it less 'propagandistic' and more 'business-like'. Tōgō, acting on behalf of Arita, who was once again Japanese foreign minister, wanted to scrap all of Hitler's envisioned military provisions. Because Hitler's draft was lost, it is impossible to say what these were, but from the context, it seems likely that they were both a defensive as well as an offensive alliance against the Soviet Union, because Tōgō, when he was unable to have all military provisions scrapped outright, instead took the position that any such provisions should be purely defensive, implying that they were offensive as well at some point.

Japanese government decision on the Anti-Comintern Pact, 24 July 1936, excerpt

The Anti-Comintern Pact itself should be limited in its phraseology and should refer only to an exchange of information against the subversive activities of the Comintern. To include more than the foregoing in the pact would anger and alarm the Soviet Union unnecessarily and would provide other countries with an opportunity for engaging in propaganda activities against us.

...

Japanese-German collaboration must not be a cause of anxiety to any other powers, especially Britain. Anglo-Japanese relations are not friendly at present because of the China question and certain economic issues that cannot be adjusted as yet, but one of the keynotes of our foreign policy must be to improve our relations with Britain, which has substantial influence with other world powers, and we must at the very least avoid a face-to-face confrontation with it at all costs.

— Ohata, Tokushiro (1976). "The Anti-Comintern Pact, 1935–1939". In Morley, James William (ed.). "Deterrent Diplomacy: Japan, Germany and the USSR, 1935–1940". pp. 32, 39. ISBN 9780231089692.

On 24 July 1936, the Japanese government after some deliberation formally requested that the Anti-Comintern Pact should be limited only to an intelligence and information exchange as to avoid unnecessary diplomatic complications with the Soviet Union. The Japanese government also specifically requested to avoid any direct alliance and to instead only require consultation in case of attack, even in the secret protocol. Furthermore, the Japanese government requested clarification to make any obligation in case of a war of one of the parties against the Soviet Union specifically defensive (to avoid being drawn into a German offensive war against the USSR at an inopportune time), and to avoid specifically naming the Soviet Union in the treaty, even in the secret protocol. The first two requests made their way into the final version of the Anti-Comintern Pact, but the third did not. The Soviet Union's name was only avoided in the public parts of the treaty, and the secret protocol of the finalized Anti-Comintern Pact still specifically referred to the USSR.

Additionally, the Japanese government also requested clarification on the prohibition on bilateral treaties with the Soviet Union without former consent, fearing that the wording of the treaty would allow Germany to maintain existing bilateral treaties with the USSR, including the Treaty of Rapallo (1922) and the Treaty of Berlin (1926). Specifically the latter treaty, which was a German–Soviet neutrality pact that had been upheld even by the anti-communist Nazis, was viewed in Japan as contradictory to the proposed terms of the Anti-Comintern Pact. The German government viewed the Anti-Comintern Pact as sufficient to override the terms of the Treaty of Berlin, and the Japanese government was satisfied with this explanation as long as it was attached to the treaty as a secret appendix.

The Japanese government in its internal memoranda also stressed the vital necessity to avoid a deterioration of Anglo–Japanese relations as a result of the pact. There was a hope in Japan that the Anti-Comintern Pact could appeal to anti-communist circles in the United Kingdom and mend the two countries' relationship. After the pact's conclusion, this would prove to be a miscalculation. Ōshima, in a final act of insubordination to the foreign ministry, suggested to Hitler that the foreign ministry's objections could be salvaged if the anti-Soviet clauses of the treaty were added to the agreement in secret. Eventually, the foreign ministry yielded to the army's pressure, and agreed to a secret military addendum to the pact. On 16 August 1936, Ribbentrop informed Hitler that negotiations with ambassador Mushanokōji and with Ōshima had resulted in the ambassador's declaration that the Japanese government was willing in principle to approve the agreement. In a note to Hitler, Ribbentrop commented on the Japanese government's aversion to and the Japanese army's support for publication of the treaty .

Some minor adjustments were still made between August and October, when the pact was formally initialed. Its length was reduced to 5 years, down from 10 as had originally been planned. And, against Ōshima's and Hitler's hopes, the military leadership in Japan insisted that the military provisions could be only defensive and not offensive, even if agreed upon in a secret addendum. The military leadership was concerned that, if Japan was caught in a war against China, an offensive clause to the treaty would diplomatically force Japan into a war against the Soviet Union that it was militarily unwilling to fight. As a result, the first article of the secret additional protocol spoke specifically of "unprovoked attack" by the Soviet Union and had no offensive provisions. On the other hand, the Japanese side was unable to gain the upper hand on the topic of the pact's publication, which was advocated for by the Germans and which Japan had attempted to avoid. Furthermore, the secret protocol remained explicitly aimed at the Soviet Union, something that the Japanese had felt was an ineffective provision. The treaty draft was finalized on 23 October 1936.

=== Approval by the Japanese Privy Council and by Adolf Hitler ===
The Anti-Comintern Pact required the approval of the Privy Council of Japan to allow Japanese accession to the treaty. Prime Minister Hirota had expressed his personal relief upon hearing the treaty draft's conclusion on 23 October 1936, and compared the achievement of the IJA in its advancement of the Anti-Comintern Pact to the IJN's success in forging the 1902 Anglo-Japanese Alliance. The elder Japanese statesman Saionji Kinmochi, last of the genrō, had disagreed with the Japanese government's diplomatic step and denounced the Anti-Comintern Pact as exclusively useful to Germany and as without benefit for Japan. Kinmochi instead would have preferred a diplomatic course more in line with Japanese public opinion and geography, both of which made a positive relationship with UK and USA desirable. However, Kinmochi's critical stance remained unheard in the Privy Council.

In the view of the proponents of the treaty within Japan, spearheaded by the IJA, Japan was militarily threatened by the Soviet Union's meddling in China, just as Germany was threatened by Soviet support for France and Czechoslovakia. Furthermore, both countries feared subversion by communist forces. This, as a result, made Germany and Japan natural allies against the Soviet Union and the Comintern. The opponents, who gathered around the IJN, cited the likelihood that the Anti-Comintern Pact would increase rather than decrease the threat posed by the USSR and that there would be considerable domestic resistance against the agreement. Ultimately, the supporters won out in the discussions that took place on 13 November and 18 November, and the Privy Council gave the treaty its unanimous support on 25 November 1936. On the German side, all that was required for German accession to the pact was Hitler's approval, which was given quickly, and subsequently supported by a wave of anti-communist propaganda in the state-controlled German press.

== Signing ==
The treaty, which outlined a joint German and Japanese policy to counteract the activities of the Communist Internationale, was initially to be in force for five years, until November 1941. Two additional protocols were signed, one of which was public. The other, which was specifically aimed against the Soviet Union, was secret. The treaty was signed in the offices of Dienststelle Ribbentrop rather than the German foreign ministry. Ribbentrop, in his Nuremberg testimony, attributed this to Hitler's desire to avoid the usage of official channels of German politics for what Ribbentrop referred to as an "ideological question" rather than a political one.

=== Texts of the Anti-Comintern Pact and its protocols ===
==== Main agreement ====
The German-Japanese Agreement against the Communist International [25 Nov 1936]

The Government of the German Reich and the Imperial Japanese Government, recognizing that the aim of the Communist International, known as the Comintern, is to disintegrate and subdue existing States by all means at its command; convinced that the toleration of interference by the Communist International in the internal affairs of the nations not only endangers their internal peace and social well being, but is also a menace to the peace of the world; desirous of cooperating in the defence against Communist subversion; have agreed as follows

Article 1: The High Contracting States agree to inform one another of the activities of the Communist International, to consult with one another on the necessary preventive measures and to carry these through in close collaboration.

Article 2: The High Contracting Parties will jointly invite third States whose internal peace is threatened by the subversive activities of the Communist International to adopt defensive measures in the spirit of this agreement or to take part in the present agreement.

Article 3: The German as well as the Japanese text of the present agreement is to be deemed the original text. It comes into force on the day of signature and shall remain in force for a period of five years. Before the expiry of this period the High Contracting Parties will come to an understanding over the further methods of their cooperation.

— Presseisen, Ernst L. (1958). Germany and Japan: A Study in Totalitarian Diplomacy 1933–1941. Den Haag: Springer-Science + Business Media. doi:10.1007/978-94-017-6590-9. ISBN 9789401765909. p. 327.

The full text was considered in its original form in both the German and Japanese versions, and the date was specified in both countries' versions as 25 November 1936 as well as 25 November in the 11th year of the Shōwa period. The agreement bears the signatures of German ambassador-at-large Ribbentrop and Japanese ambassador to Germany Mushanokōji. The initial length of the treaty was specified to be five years. This reduced length was one of the concessions made after the objections of the Japanese foreign ministry to the initial Bayreuth draft of the treaty, in which the treaty was at first supposed to have a duration of ten years.

In the first article of the treaty, Germany and Japan agreed to share information about Comintern activities and to plan their operations against such activities jointly. In the second article, the two parties opened the possibility of extending the pact to other countries "whose domestic peace is endangered by the disruptive activities of the Communist Internationale". Such invitations to third parties would be undertaken jointly and after the expressed consent by both parties. German state media referred to this provision of endangerment by Comintern disruption when, among other examples, the Völkischer Beobachter recounted various communist activities in Hungary and Manchukuo as the reason for the two countries to join the pact in February 1939.

==== Protocol supplement ====
Supplementary Protocol [to the German-Japanese Agreement against the Communist International] [25 Nov 1936]

On the occasion of the signing today of the agreement against the Communist International, the undersigned Plenipotentiaries have agreed as follows:

a) The competent authorities of the two High Contracting States will work in close collaboration in matters concerning the exchange of information over the activities of the Communist International as well as investigatory and defensive measures against the Communist International.

b) The competent authorities of the two High Contracting States will within the framework of the existing laws take severe measures against those who at home or abroad are engaged directly or indirectly in the service of the Communist International or promote its subversive activities.

c) In order to facilitate the cooperation of the competent authorities provided for in paragraph (a) a permanent committee will be set up. In this committee the further defensive measures necessary for the struggle against the subversive adivities of the Communist International will be considered and discussed.

— Presseisen, Ernst L. (1958). Germany and Japan: A Study in Totalitarian Diplomacy 1933–1941. Den Haag: Springer-Science + Business Media. doi:10.1007/978-94-017-6590-9. ISBN 9789401765909. pp. 327–328.

A supplementary protocol was signed along with the agreement on the same day, 25 November 1936/Shōwa 11. Just like the main agreement, it bears the signatures of Ribbentrop and Mushanokōji.

In the first article, German and Japan agreed to have their competent authorities "closely co-operate in the exchange of reports on the activities of ... and on measures of information and defense against" the Comintern. The two contracting parties also agreed, in the second article, to have their competent authorities "within the framework of the existing law ... take stringent measures against those who at home or abroad work on direct or indirect duty" of the Comintern.

==== Secret additional protocol ====
Text of the Secret Additional Protocol to the German-Japanese Agreement [25 Nov 1936]

The Government of the German Reich and the Imperial Japanese Government, recognizing that the Government of the U.S.S.R. is working toward a realization of the aims of the Communist International and intends to employ its army for this purpose; convinced that this fact threatens not only the existence of the High Contracting States, but endangers world peace most seriously; in order to safeguard their common interests have agreed as follows:

Article 1: Should one of the High Contracting States become the object of an unprovoked attack or threat of attack by the U.S.S.R., the other High Contracting State obligates itself to take no measures which would tend to ease the situation of the U.S.S.R. Should the case described in paragraph 1 occur, the High Contracting States will immediately consult on what measures to take to safeguard their common interests.

Article 2: For the duration of the present agreement the High Contracting States will conclude no political treaties with the U.S.S.R. contrary to the spirit of this agreement without mutual consent.

Article 3: The German as well as the Japanese text of the present agreement is to be deemed the original text. The agreement comes into force simultaneously with the agreement against the Communist International signed today and will remain in force for the same period.

— Presseisen, Ernst L. (1958). Germany and Japan: A Study in Totalitarian Diplomacy 1933–1941. Den Haag: Springer-Science + Business Media. doi:10.1007/978-94-017-6590-9. ISBN 9789401765909. p. 328.

In addition to the main treaty and the public additional protocol ("Protocol Supplement"), there was also another additional protocol on 25 November 1936/Shōwa 11, this one kept in strict secrecy from the public, which specifically dealt with the establishment of Germany's and Japan's military and diplomatic partnership against the Soviet Union. While the Soviet Union was alluded to with the public protocol's references to Comintern activity, the secret additional protocol is the only one where the USSR is actually mentioned by name. Just like the main agreement and the public additional protocol, the secret additional protocol was signed by Ribbentrop and Mushanokōji.

The latter protocol's secrecy was agreed upon in a separate document signed by both Ribbentrop and Mushanokōji, in which the two states created the option to inform third parties about the contents of the secret agreement with mutual consent. Ambassador Mushanokōji informed Japanese foreign minister Hachirō Arita of the successful conclusion of negotiations later on in the day.

The secret additional protocol reveals the true intention of the Anti-Comintern Pact. Rather than a vague ideological crackdown on the alleged overreach of communist activists, it was a specific defensive alliance direct particularly against the Soviet Union as a country. Due to its covert nature, the secret additional protocol remained exclusive between Germany and Japan, whereas other countries joined only the two public clauses of the treaty. Starting with Italy, the other countries of the Anti-Comintern Pact did not sign the secret additional protocol.

=== Reactions ===
To the international community, the Anti-Comintern Pact signalled the beginning of the German–Japanese partnership, as it marked the first formal alliance between the two countries.

==== China ====
The Anti-Comintern Pact between Germany and Japan was a direct threat to China, which relied on German military assistance against the threat of the imminent Japanese invasion. The German foreign ministry, which had been opposed to Dienststelle Ribbentrop's alignment with Japan, made significant efforts to reassure China of German assistance. This lasted until the outbreak of hostilities between Japan and China in July 1937, after which Germany, keeping with Ribbentrop's agenda, aligned clearly with Japan, including the German compliance with Japanese requests to recall the military mission of Alexander von Falkenhausen.

==== France ====
In France, the Anti-Comintern Pact, especially after Italy's entry, was viewed as a German power grab in Eastern Europe, particularly to the detriment of Czechoslovakia and Poland.

==== Germany ====
The German public was informed of the treaty's entry into legislation by the German Reichsgesetzblatt in 1937. Ribbentrop justified the Anti-Comintern Pact as a joint German–Japanese act to defend Western civilization. The existence of the secret additional protocol and the treaty's anti-Soviet nature was denied in Nazi Germany even after the beginning of the German–Soviet War in 1941. The German government launched a pro-Japanese publicity campaign to improve the general opinion of the German public about Japan. This was part of the German government's attempt to forge a tighter cultural relationship.

==== Italy ====
The Italian government, which had still viewed Germany as a potential rival well into the year 1935, had initially abstained from the negotiations of the Anti-Comintern Pact. But starting with the Italo-German protocol of 23 October 1936, Germany and Italy had begun a diplomatic rapprochement against the backdrop of the Italian war in Ethiopia and the resulting failure of the Italian Stresa Front with the UK and France. Still, Italy was keen to, at least initially, avoid the implication that it would soon adhere to the Anti-Comintern Pact itself, even though Ribbentrop heavily implied that "Italy will hoist the anti-Bolshevist banner in the south" soon after the pact's creation. Hitler shared that same impression. Italy would end up joining the pact in November 1937.

==== Japan ====
The Japanese public as a whole did not receive the Anti-Comintern Pact with any particular enthusiasm. In the aftermath of the agreement, the influx of national socialist ideology into Japanese society after the alignment with Germany caused an increase in antisemitism in Japan. The Japanese press, less restricted than its German counterpart, was even partially critical of the pact's apparently sudden and rushed conclusion (the negotiations had been kept in strict secrecy from the public until the pact's publication), and there were doubts in the newspapers' opinion pieces about the willingness of Germany to sacrifice its soldiers in the case of a war between Japan and the Soviet Union.

In Tokyo, the government was reluctant to attract any unwanted international antagonists, while it remained focussed on its aims in mainland China. As such, the government had been initially cautious, reluctant to cause a diplomatic incident with the Soviet Union, the United Kingdom and the United States, but eventually saw itself driven into the treaty when the Soviet Union signed a Mutual Assistance Pact with the Mongolian People's Republic in March 1936; however, despite the government's scepticism, the Privy Council had given its unanimous consent.

As a result of the Anti-Comintern Pact, the military influence within the government was strengthened. The Japanese government, in response to the upsurge of antisemitism that resulted from the influx of European-style national socialist ideology into Japanese society, began using antisemitic imagery in its media campaigns, particularly those directed against western-style capitalism. Prime Minister Hirota called Germany Japan's foremost diplomatic partner after the treaty, but stressed that the Anti-Comintern Pact did not imply ideological support for Germany's domestic policy.

The IJA, which traditionally was an admirer and imitator of German military systems, which employed hundreds of German military experts and advisors by the 1920s, and sent Japanese army hopefuls to Germany for study, was the treaty's main proponent. Prince Kotohito had signalled the army's positive predisposition towards Ōshima's efforts in Berlin. The IJA was closely aligned with its German counterpart and a strong proponent of a joint Japanese-German action against the Soviet Union.

The IJN, by contrast, was among the treaty's greatest critics. While the IJN officer class was not necessarily denouncing the pact, its usefulness was seen as very limited. The IJN view of the naval situation was one where Japan had an inferior naval force to that of the United Kingdom and the United States, both of whom were furthermore inclined to cooperate with each other to counteract the Japanese presence if necessary. By contrast, Germany (and later Italy) would be of almost no help to alleviate an Anglo-American naval blockade or aid the Japanese naval efforts in the Pacific. The Japanese navy would have preferred to avoid the treaty if that meant a better relationship with the United States and the United Kingdom as a result.

==== Soviet Union ====
Speech of Maxim Litvinov to the All-Union Congress, 26 November 1936

Well-informed people refuse to believe that for the drawing of the two scanty published articles of the German-Japanese agreement it was necessary to conduct negotiations for fifteen months, and that on the Japanese side it was necessary to entrust these negotiations to an Army general, and on the German side to an important diplomat, and that it was necessary to conduct these negotiations in an atmosphere of the strictest secrecy. As regards the published ... agreement, it is only a camouflage for another agreement which was simultaneously discussed and initially ... in which the word 'Communism' is not even mentioned.

— Stratman, George John (1970). "The Anti-Comintern Pact 1933–1936". Germany's diplomatic relations with Japan 1933–1941. Graduate Student Theses, Dissertations, & Professional Papers. 2450. University of Montana. p. 26.

Publicly, the Soviet government attempted to downplay the significance of the pact. However the Anti-Comintern Pact was seen internally as a clear sign of an attempted encirclement by Germany and Japan. In a political note to the Hungarian government in January 1939, Soviet foreign minister Maxim Litvinov called the Anti-Comintern Pact a "political instrument mainly in the hands of the Japanese, who had hostile intentions against the Soviet Union". Litvinov had also, in speaking to the All-Union Congress of Soviets on 26 November, cast doubt on the completeness of the treaty as presented to the public, declaring it to be "only a camouflage for another agreement which was simultaneously discussed".

Soviet diplomats quickly came to the same opinion that had been implied by Litvinov on 26 November: the Anti-Comintern Pact was specifically directed against the USSR. Soviet ambassador in Tokyo Konstantin Yurenev believed (correctly) that the pact, behind its facade, contained military provisions against the Soviet Union. Yurenev had even contacted Japanese foreign minister Arita before the pact's publication, on 16 November and 20 November. While Arita had on the first request dodged the issue by pointing to the fact that the negotiations were only concerned with the Comintern and not the Soviet Union, he did not respond to the latter contact by Yurenev, in which the ambassador accused the Japanese foreign service of holding secret negotiations with Germany specifically aimed against the USSR.

The Anti-Comintern Pact politically accelerated the downward trend of the Soviet Union's trade relations with Japan. Alarmed by the Anti-Comintern Pact, the USSR had cut down sales to and purchases from Japan: in 1939, Japanese imports from European Russia were the lowest since 1914 and exports to European Russia the lowest since 1926, whereas Japanese imports from Asiatic Russia were the lowest since 1887 and exports to Asiatic Russia the lowest since 1914. The Anti-Comintern Pact's restrictive policy towards bilateral treaties between Japan and the USSR without German consent made this downward spiral hard to fix. Only after the German-Soviet Pact of 1939 and the subsequent decrease of Japanese trust in Germany did the mutual political and economic attitude improve.

==== United Kingdom ====
The United Kingdom also saw its colonial empire in Asia and eventually Africa threatened by the Japanese and later also the Italian alliance with Germany. This view was not completely unjustified in the context of the Axis Powers' navies, as the naval high commands of Germany, Italy and Japan mainly aimed their common considerations against the United Kingdom, not the Soviet Union. In the House of Commons, the Anti-Comintern Pact became a subject of debate multiple times. (Note: 10 November 1937: https://hansard.parliament.uk/Commons/1937-11-10/debates/97c6b766-8736-40b2-8d14-316669caf24b/Anti-CominternPact – 15 November 1937: https://hansard.parliament.uk/Commons/1937-11-15/debates/2cf1d7ec-1ab9-44a6-8fbb-5cc4885bac8a/Anti-CominternPact – 5 December 1938: https://hansard.parliament.uk/Commons/1938-12-05/debates/198662c2-eafb-4c62-b38b-914e84a5fef9/Anti-CominternPact) The British armed forces were concerned about a potential military conflict with Germany and Japan, and this feeling was escalated upon Italian accession to the agreement.

==== United States ====
In the United States, the German-Japanese agreement was viewed as an indication that Germany might follow Japan's path of satisfying territorial claims with military action, as Japan had done in Manchuria in 1931. In a September 1937 report to the Treasury (after the outbreak of the Second Sino-Japanese War), it was argued that the long-term consequence of a Japanese victory in China would result in other "dissatisfied" powers, such as Germany and Italy, seeking the fulfillment of their objectives in military endeavors of their own. The American armed forces were concerned about the prospect of Japan gaining military allies in the form of Germany and later Italy, as that posed a potential threat to the American War Plan Orange.

In 1937, American ambassador to Japan Joseph Grew analyzed the Anti-Comintern Pact's anti-communist rhetoric as a mere banner for "have-not" countries to unite under while in truth aiming primarily against the British Empire's global dominance. Franklin D. Roosevelt, U.S. president from 1933 to 1945, shared French concerns about the safety of Poland and Czechoslovakia. Roosevelt believed that the pact contained secret clauses outlining an alliance that was both defensive and offensive, and that it divided the world into spheres of influence for each of the signatories. Eventually, the USS Panay incident of 1937 resulted in the President's attempt to break the Anti-Comintern Pact by appeasing Germany and Italy with the goal of isolating Japan from its allies to hinder its progress in China. Cordell Hull noted in his memoirs that "[n]othing could have been more logical and natural than an alliance of Berlin and Tokyo", citing shared values of militarism, conquest and disregard for international treaties as the reason for his conclusion.

== Expansion and adaptations ==
The Anti-Comintern Pact's original provisions had included a specific provision that allowed Germany and Japan to jointly invite additional members into the pact. In Japan, the Anti-Comintern Pact was seen as possibly groundbreaking in freeing the country from its international isolation and to acquire new diplomatic and military partners. Countries whose membership Japan was interested in included the United Kingdom, the Netherlands and especially Poland.

=== Second Sino-Japanese War ===
The Anti-Comintern Pact between Germany and Japan met its first trial when Japan and China, both of whom were important partners with Germany, went to war. The Second Sino-Japanese War, provoked by the Japanese forces through the Marco Polo Bridge Incident, forced Germany to reassess the balance of its economic relationship with China and its ideological and military alignment with Japan. It was evident that Germany would have to abandon one of its partners in favor of the other, and made the decision to favor Japan over China, although Hitler himself had as late as 1936 personally still assured the Chinese ambassador that Germany would maintain the two countries' important relationship.

While Germany's policy in regards to the war between Japan and China was one of strict neutrality, it made no particular effort, diplomatic or otherwise, to stop the Japanese aggression against China. The German government and foreign service still remained privately critical of the Japanese course of action. When Japanese ambassador to Germany Mushanokōji explained to state secretary Ernst von Weizsäcker that the Japanese invasion of China kept in the spirit of the Anti-Comintern Pact in its attempt to vanquish Chinese communism, Weizsäcker dismissed Mushanokōji's explanation on the basis of the German view that the Japanese action would foster rather than stifle the growth of communism in China. Weizsäcker, in his notes with regards to this conversation with Mushanokōji, expressed the fear that the Japanese aggression could lead directly to an alliance between the Soviet Union and China.

=== Entry of Italy ===
Italian entry protocol (6 November 1937)

The Italian Government, the Government of the German Reich, the Imperial Government of Japan,

Considering that the Communist International continues constantly to endanger the civilised world in the West and the East, disturbing and destroying peace and order,

Convinced that only strict collaboration among all the States interested in the maintenance of peace and order, can limit and remove that danger,

Considering that Italy—who with the advent of the Fascist Regime has fought such a danger with inflexible determination and has eliminated the Communist International from her territory—has decided to range herself against the common enemy by the side of Germany and Japan, who for their parts are animated by the same will to defend themselves against the Communist International

Have, in accordance with Article 2 of the Agreement against the Communist International concluded at Berlin on 25th November, 1936, between Germany and Japan, agreed to the following:

Article 1: Italy participates in (entra a far parte) the Agreement against the Communist International and in the supplementary Protocol concluded on 25th November, 1936, between Germany and Japan, the text of which is quoted in the annex to the present Protocol.

Article 2: The three signatory Powers of the present Protocol agree that Italy shall be considered as an original signatory of the Agreement and of the supplementary Protocol mentioned in the preceding Article, the signature of the present Protocol being equivalent to the signature of the original text of the aforesaid Agreement and supplementary Protocol.

Article 3: The present Protocol will constitute an integral part of the above mentioned Agreement and supplementary Protocol.

Article 4: The present Protocol is drawn up in Italian, Japanese and German, each text being considered as authentic. It will enter into force on the day of the signature.

In faith of which the undersigned, duly authorised by their respective Governments, have signed the present Protocol and have attached their seals thereto.

Made in triplicate at Rome, the 6th November, 1937: Year 16 of the Fascist Era, which corresponds to 6th November of the 12th year of Showa.

— Hansard Debates, Volume 327, 10 November 1937, hansard.parliament.uk, retrieved on 27 Sep 2019

On 6 November 1937, Italy joined the Anti-Comintern Pact. Italy's decision was a reaction to the failure of the Stresa Front, the Franco-British initiative of 1935 designed to keep Germany from extending beyond its present borders. In particular, both nations tried to block "German expansionism", especially the annexation of Austria, which the fascist government in Rome also wanted to prevent at that time.

Distrustful relations and Benito Mussolini's own expansionism furthered the distance between Italy and the two Allied Powers. Italy invaded Ethiopia in October 1935, in an act of unprovoked aggression that was a breach of the League of Nations policy. Although the attempted Hoare–Laval Pact, designed by its British and French drafters to allow Italy to retain most of its war goals and to maintain the Stresa Front, had failed to gain support, the League of Nations had discredited itself. After the League eventually punished Italian expansionism with economic sanctions, this broke the Stresa Front and resulted in the necessity for Italy to search for a new partner. As a result, Italy was diplomatically driven away from the Stresa Front with the Allies and towards the Pact of Steel with Germany. Italy's accession to the Anti-Comintern Pact completed the diplomatic triangle between Germany, Italy and Japan later formalized in the Tripartite Pact that was colloquially known as the Axis powers, inspired by the term used by Benito Mussolini in reference to the German-Italian relationship on 1 November 1936.

Italy's accession into the pact was a trade-off, in which Mussolini agreed to Hitler's goals of Austrian annexation. Italy had been invited to the pact as early as the original German-Japanese agreement in November 1936, but was at the time uninterested in the largely symbolic gesture, as the Italian government believed that its anti-communist attitude was sufficiently represented by the Italian presence in the Spanish Civil War. Italian membership had been considered by Ribbentrop during the earliest drafting stages of the agreement in October 1935. German-Italian rapprochement did not fully begin until October 1936, when the Anti-Comintern Pact between Germany and Japan was already nearing its enactment.

Galeazzo Ciano, Italy's foreign minister, was apprehensive about the potential loss of influence for Italy in South East Europe that a close alignment with Germany and the subsequent German entry into the Balkans would entail. The Italian stance towards a Third Europe or Horizontal Axis, the idea of a power bloc in Eastern Europe that rejected both German and Soviet influence, was not necessarily negative. It was this ambivalence in Italian foreign policy that initially hindered a full Italian alignment with Germany.

By 1937, the Italian interest in the pact had changed, as the Mussolini administration desired to have its own military alliance with Japan and felt that accession to the agreement would be the easiest way to forge the triangular alliance with Germany and Japan that the Italian government desired. Ciano commented in his diary on 2 November 1937 that the pact, while anti-communist in name, was instead "clearly anti-British". The protocol of Italy's entry was signed on 6 November 1937. As a result of the phrasing of the treaty, from a purely legal argument, Italy was required to only adhere to the main text and the public supplementary protocol, but not to the secret protocol that had the specific military directives against the Soviet Union.

In reaction to the Italian accession to the pact, the British government saw the traditional British dominance in the Mediterranean (Gibraltar, Malta, Cyprus, and Egypt (Suez Canal)) threatened by a potentially resurgent Italy backed with German industrial and military power. Robert Vansittart, a prominent critic of the British Appeasement policy under Neville Chamberlain, warned that Italy, with its recent acquisitions in the war against Ethiopia, threatened a pincer movement against Egypt and the Anglo-Egyptian Sudan and that Mussolini, due to his personality, could not be deterred even by Italy's economic instability from a potential military adventure against the United Kingdom.

=== Attempts to develop the pact into a military alliance ===
After the signing of the Anti-Comintern Pact and especially after Italy's entry, Ribbentrop continued his efforts to form it into a full military alliance. This mirrored the thoughts of Ribbentrop, Raumer, Ōshima and Hitler during the treaty's creation, as the original draft that Hitler signed off on in Bayreuth had likely included military terms that were explicitly both defensive as well as offensive. This was prevented by the intervention of Japanese diplomats around Shigenori Tōgō.

After the pact's conclusion, Ribbentrop's efforts to transform it into a military alliance continued, although his agenda was driven by the concern with war against the western allies, whereas Hitler's main primary concern had been to eliminate the Soviet Union. Ribbentrop in his function as German ambassador to the United Kingdom recommended to Hitler in his report of 28 December 1937 and his final conclusions of 2 January 1938 the creation of a strong anti-British alliance with the ability to threaten the United Kingdom in a way that would either compel it to stay neutral or in the case of war be able to defeat it.

Ribbentrop's political power within the German foreign service grew massively when he was named foreign minister as a replacement for Konstantin von Neurath on 4 February 1938. This was part of the reshuffle of army, air force and foreign service caused by the dismissal of Werner von Blomberg and Werner von Fritsch. In this military-political purge, Hitler removed twelve generals (not counting Blomberg and Fritsch) and reassigned 51 other military posts. The removal of Neurath, Fritsch and Blomberg marked the elimination of large parts of the 'moderate' faction in the cabinet Hitler, where as the 'extremists' remained: Goebbels, Hess, Rosenberg and Ribbentrop.

The May Crisis of 1938, when there was a perception of aggressive German troop movements against Czechoslovakia, brought with it strong diplomatic reactions from France and Britain that went contrary to the established Appeasement policy. As a result, Ribbentrop renewed his pressure on Hitler to formalize the Anti-Comintern Pact into a full military alliance for the case of war against the United Kingdom and France. He eventually also gained the support of Bernardo Attolico, Italian ambassador to Germany, for the idea.

In early January 1939, Ribbentrop was certain of his progress in transforming the pact into an alliance. Mussolini, who had by now given up his attempts at Italian diplomatic ambivalence between the United Kingdom and Germany and fully committed to Italian alliance with Germany, gave his agreement as well. Mussolini also advocated to even expand this prospective alliance to include Yugoslavia, Hungary and Romania.

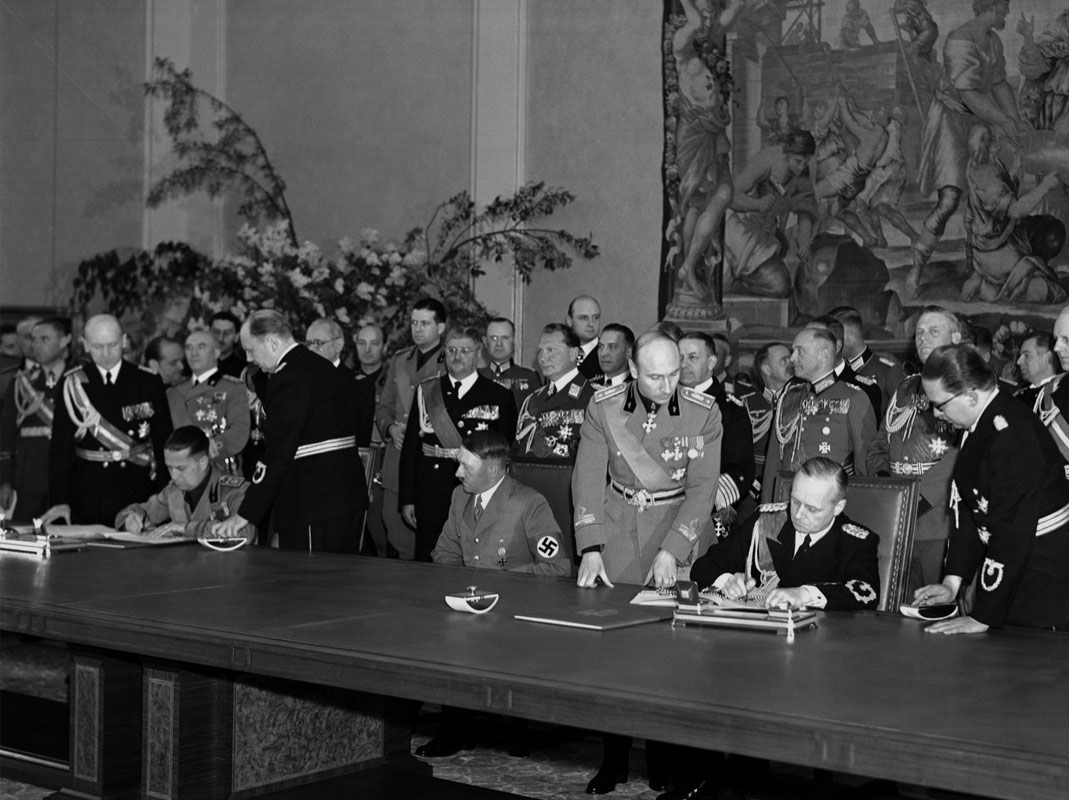
Signing of the Pact of Steel by Galeazzo Ciano for Italy and Joachim von Ribbentrop for Germany

Henceforth, from January 1939 onward, Italy and Germany cooperated on their draft of a military alliance, but Japan was cautious to commit. While the political lobby of the Japanese army was generally in favor of the conclusion of a military alliance with Germany, particularly in order to contain the Soviet Union, the Japanese navy continued to view the prospect of an alliance with Germany as of no particular use for Japan's naval strategic position and as a potential diplomatic and economic blunder, as Japan's navy alone would not be sufficient to hold off British and American naval forces if an alliance with Germany would lead Japan into war with either of the Anglo-American powers, thus cutting off Japan, dependent on vital shipping routes.

The overall Japanese attitude, still anti-Soviet rather than anti-British, did not fit with the German and Italian designs to openly antagonize the United Kingdom. The Japanese foreign service did not wish to be drawn into a war between the nations of Western Europe and as a result aimed to differentiate between the Axis Powers' designs against the UK and those against the USSR. Ribbentrop's designs were thus rejected by the Japanese delegates, who insisted on the Anti-Comintern Pact's initial anti-communist designs and were unwilling to see an anti-British component added to it.

Eventually, Japanese caution led Ribbentrop to settle for only a bilateral alliance rather than the trilateral one he had hoped for, and the Pact of Steel was signed between Germany and Italy on 22 May 1939. The Pact of Steel's capabilities were commented on by Ciano as "real dynamite". The Pact of Steel enabled Germany to proceed in its aggressive posturing against Poland, as this issue did not necessarily require Japanese consent or support, but Ribbentrop also desired to expand the Pact of Steel and include Japan in it. However, Japanese stalling tactics continued, and Germany wanted to eliminate the Soviet Union as a potential factor in its war against Poland.

As a result, Ribbentrop started seriously pondering a quid pro quo with the USSR on the question of Eastern Europe's future. This would mark a complete betrayal of the Anti-Comintern Pact's provision to not make bilateral treaties with the Soviet Union without Japanese consent, but Germany proceeded nonetheless. In May 1939, Ribbentrop instructed Friedrich-Werner Graf von der Schulenburg to initiate a German-Soviet rapprochement on the basis that the newly forged Pact of Steel marked a turn in Germany's foreign policy, away from anti-Soviet towards anti-British and anti-French diplomacy. Ribbentrop also promised to redirect Japanese anti-Soviet foreign policy into a state where Japan and the USSR would no longer have to stand in rivalry.

At this stage, Ribbentrop also started envisioning a bloc of four, where the Soviet Union would be included with Germany, Italy and Japan to form a quadripartite faction against British influence. This marked a complete deviation from Nazi policy, particularly the Hitlerian goal of Lebensraum, and was one of the many iterations of Ribbentrop's all-encompassing foreign political goal of containing by all possible means the influence of the United Kingdom. This Euro-Asiatic bloc of four, as historian Wolfgang Michalka calls it, ultimately failed because of the differences between Germany, the Soviet Union and Japan. Germany and the Soviet Union signed the Molotov–Ribbentrop Pact in August 1939.

=== Entry of Hungary and Manchukuo ===
Hungary joined the agreement on 24 February 1939. It received the invitation to the pact on 13 January, after the Hungarian foreign minister István Csáky announced on 12 January that Hungary would accept an invitation if it were to receive one. It was the first member with some independence outside of the big three, and it was subsequently the first country to be denied first-class status among the pact's members, thus establishing the division between Germany, Italy and Japan as the leading nations of the pact and the remaining countries as their subordinates. This superior status of the three leading countries was later formalized in the extension of the pact on 25 November 1941.

The pact proved unpopular in Hungary, particularly as Hungary's long-standing ally Poland became Germany's target. In his memoirs, Hungary's strongman Miklós Horthy would later complain that Germany had unduly involved itself in Hungarian domestic affairs even before Hungary's accession to the Anti-Comintern Pact, and that German media had no place to insist that Hungary had a 'bill to pay' after profiting from German diplomatic intervention on her behalf during the First Vienna Award. However, the German archives show that a clear quid pro quo had been made between Germany and Hungary: in exchange for the German support for Hungarian territorial expansion into southern Slovakia and Carpatho-Ukraine, Hungarian Prime Minister Kálmán Darányi specifically promised Hungary would leave the League of Nations and join the Anti-Comintern Pact.

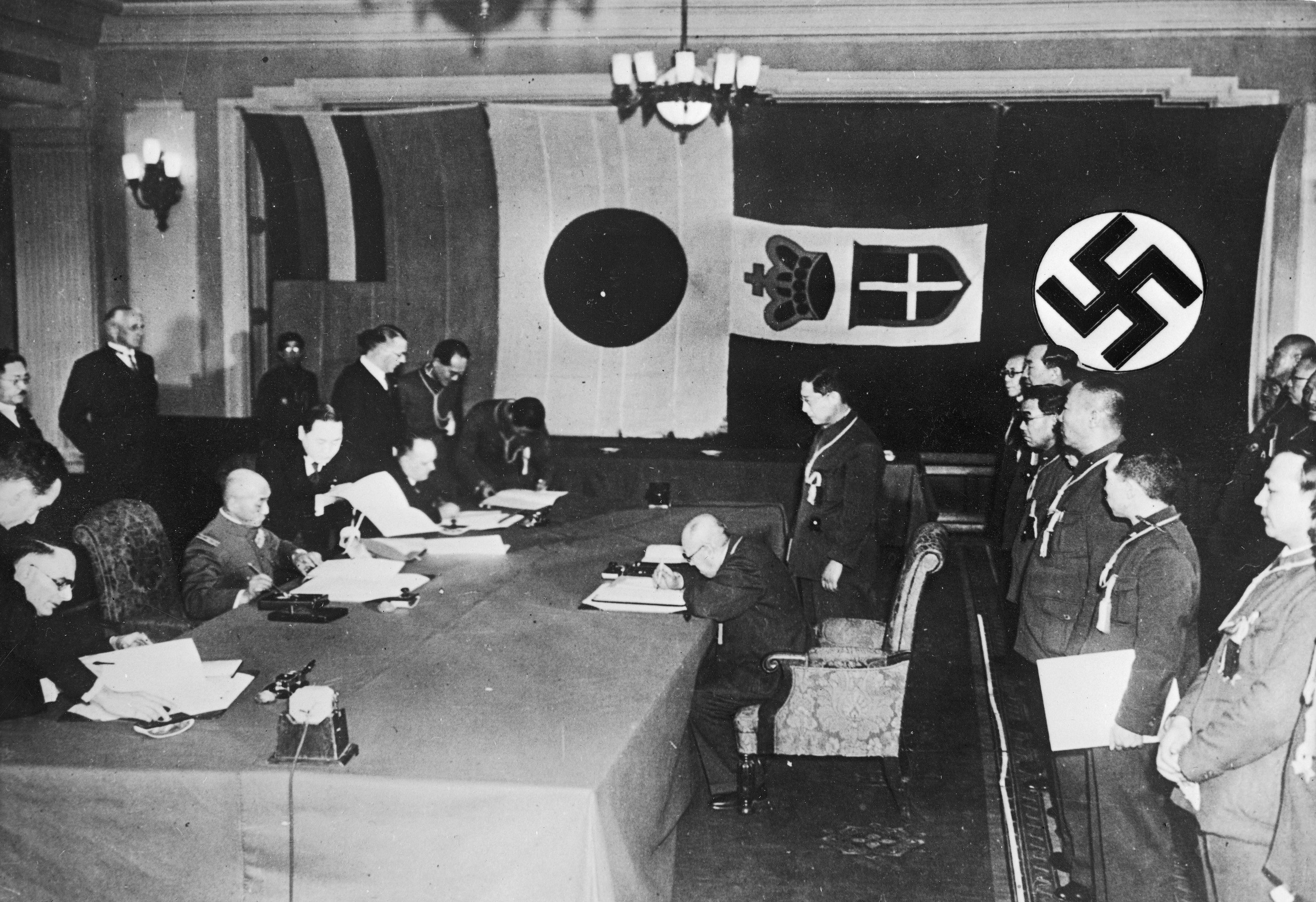
Manchukuo joins the Anti-Comintern Pact in Changchun

Another country that joined the pact on 24 February 1939 was the Japanese-established Empire of Manchukuo. Manchukuo received the invitation on 16 January and the accession protocol was signed in Changchun on 24 February. The entry of Hungary and Manchukuo was celebrated by the German state-controlled Völkischer Beobachter as the growth of the front against bolshevism and the consolidation of a world order.

=== Entry of Spain ===
Francisco Franco's Spain joined the pact on 27 March 1939, the same day that the surrender of the Spanish Republicans at the end of the Siege of Madrid brought about the end of the Spanish Civil War. The accelerated addition of Spain to the Anti-Comintern Pact, with the goal to counteract British influence in Spain, had been pursued by German, Italian and Japanese politicians since at least January 1939. It was specified by German State Secretary Weizsäcker that the invitation to Spain should only come from Germany, Italy, and Japan, but not from Hungary. The Spanish side delayed the accession to the pact, as the Franco leadership feared intervention by the Allied powers on the Republican side should the Nationalists side with the Axis before the war's conclusion. Franco's foreign minister, Francisco Gómez-Jordana Sousa, accordingly stalled Spain's entry into the Anti-Comintern Pact until the end of the Spanish Civil War.

Spain's membership in the pact was proof of Spanish alignment with the European fascists, and the Nationalist success in the Spanish Civil War became a justification for the Anti-Comintern Pact's continued activity and as a confirmation of the pact's value. In the British House of Commons, Spain's entry into the Anti-Comintern Pact was viewed with suspicion, particularly in regards to the safety of Gibraltar and by extension Malta, British Egypt and Mandatory Palestine. The British government, after the Nationalist victory had become obvious, had attempted to quickly improve relations with the new government in Madrid, but the progress on Anglo-Spanish relations received a setback with the Spanish entry into the pact.

France, although nominally also interested in positive relations with the Falangists as seen in the Bérard-Jordana Agreement of 25 February 1939, made even less headway than the British. After Spanish entry into the Anti-Comintern Pact, there was a Spanish military buildup in colonial Morocco, and the Franco government further worsened tensions by refusing to allow the re-entry of refugees that had fled the country in the closing days of the Spanish Civil War.

=== Other considerations, 1938–1939 ===
A candidate for membership in the eyes of the Axis Powers was the Second Polish Republic. Poland had cooperated with Germany on the occupations of Czechoslovak territory after the Munich Agreement and seemed like an approachable partner, but the German offers of a Polish membership in the pact were tied to a return of Danzig to Germany, something that Poland was unwilling to accept out of concern for its access to the sea and its policy of equal diplomatic distance between Germany and the Soviet Union.

In January 1939, the Axis Powers were courting the Stojadinović government in Yugoslavia to attempt to induce Yugoslavia to join the Anti-Comintern Pact. The attempts failed when Stojadinović's government fell on 5 February 1939 and Stojadinović was replaced with Dragiša Cvetković as Prime Minister, which came as a surprise to the Axis Powers, who had believed Stojadinović was secure in office. While there were hopes among the Axis that Stojadinović might return to power, this failed to materialize.

In February 1939, the German military leadership, independent from the foreign ministry, increased the pressure on Bulgaria to join the Anti-Comintern Pact. Generalmajor Georg Thomas (Note: While the document itself does not mention the first name of the officer in question, it is specified in the persons' register (Ergänzungsband zu den Serien A – E, p. 361) that the person named Thomas mentioned in D-5 is Georg Thomas.) explained to the Bulgarian delegation during negotiations regarding German armament loans to Bulgaria that such loans could only be extended if Bulgaria made a clear political showing of alignment to Germany in form of joining the Anti-Comintern Pact. Weizsäcker complained to the Wehrmacht high command about this incident. Thomas subsequently claimed to Weizsäcker that he was acting on the direct orders of Hermann Göring. In a subsequent conversation between the Bulgarian delegate and Weizsäcker, it was made clear that Bulgaria was not prepared to join the Anti-Comintern Pact at that time. Bulgaria would not join the agreement until 25 November 1941. In the run up to the establishment of the Protectorate of Bohemia and Moravia in the rump territories of Czechoslovakia, Czechoslovak accession into the Anti-Comintern Pact was part of the numerous demands Hitler made on the Czechs as a pretext to justify the invasion after the inevitable non-compliance.

=== Molotov–Ribbentrop Pact ===
The pact's legitimacy was undermined when Germany blatantly broke it by secretly negotiating the Molotov–Ribbentrop Pact with the Soviet Union. During the negotiations between Ribbentrop and Stalin in Moscow in August 1939, just a few weeks before the outbreak of World War II, the Anti-Comintern Pact proved only a small obstacle. Ribbentrop told Stalin that the Anti-Comintern Pact had been aimed against the Western democracies, not the Soviet Union. Stalin accepted this for the sake of his country's diplomatic goals, and there were jokes made among the German public that the Soviet Union would end up joining the Anti-Comintern Pact itself. Soviet foreign minister Vyacheslav Molotov had not made the Anti-Comintern Pact an issue during the negotiations with Ribbentrop and German ambassador to the Soviet Union Schulenburg.

==== Reactions within the Anti-Comintern Pact ====
===== Italy =====
On the backdrop of the preparations for World War II, the Italian reaction to Germany's actions was ambivalent. The Italian population's pre-existing anti-German and anti-war sentiments were not helped at all by the Molotov–Ribbentrop Pact, but Mussolini's personal opinion was more divided. Mussolini, although sometimes of the opinion that neutrality was preferable, felt compelled by personal loyalty, fear of Hitler's disapproval, as well as the prospect of easy war spoils, that Italy should stand by Germany's side, especially if an Allied act of appeasement in Poland could result in a swift Italian victory in Yugoslavia. Italian involvement in the war was opposed by an anti-war faction in the Italian government around Ciano, who attempted to prevent Italy's entry into World War II and to break the alliance between Germany and Italy, to which Mussolini at times carefully agreed if a long enough time frame was given to dissolve the alliance. The Molotov–Ribbentrop Pact confirmed numerous suspicions that the Italian public, already unenthusiastic about any diplomatic alliance with Germany, had about the Germans. This diplomatic betrayal, combined with the eventual defeat of the Axis Powers in World War II, fuelled widespread germanophobia in Italian literature and popular culture in the immediate aftermath of World War II.

===== Japan =====
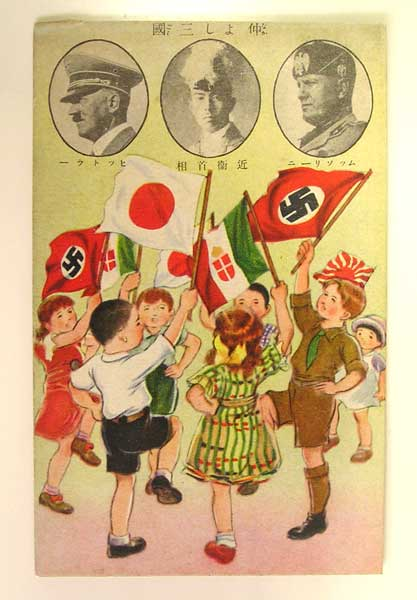
Japanese propaganda postcard published in 1938, with saying "Friendly Three Countries" and photos of Adolf Hitler, Fumimaro Konoe and Benito Mussolini

In the Japanese view, the Molotov–Ribbentrop Pact was a violation of the Anti-Comintern Pact, as Germany had not revealed its negotiations with the USSR to Japan. Subsequently, the Japanese sought to settle the Soviet–Japanese Border War and abandoned any territorial aspirations against the Soviet Union. Japan had mainly intended the Anti-Comintern Pact to be directed against the Soviet Union rather than the United Kingdom, whereas the Molotov-Ribbentrop Pact made it clear that the Germans, at least in 1939, were willing to aid the Soviets to the detriment of the western democracies. In response to this drastic German change in foreign policy and the Japanese defeat at Soviet hands in the border conflicts, the Hiranuma administration resigned.

Japanese Emperor Hirohito instructed the subsequent government, led by the Prime Minister Nobuyuki Abe, to be more cooperative towards the United Kingdom and the United States. Ribbentrop attempted to win Japanese support for his bloc of four with Germany, Italy, Japan and the Soviet Union. The German foreign minister argued that if Tokyo and Moscow were to form a military coalition together with Berlin and Rome, Japan would be free to turn its attention to the potential acquisition of European colonies in South East Asia. However, the ideological barriers were too great for comfort for the Japanese leadership, and Ribbentrop failed to compel them into an alliance with the Soviet Union. He had also put himself forward as a negotiator between Japan and the USSR, but was once again cold-shouldered by both as they began to pragmatically wrap up their differences bilaterally and without German oversight. As a result of the diplomatic shakeup, Japan retreated out of Ribbentrop's anti-British designs. Ribbentrop's pro-Japanese diplomacy, which he had pursued in spite of the German foreign ministry's initial favorability towards China since 1934, was now met with the largest diplomatic distance between Germany and Japan since the Nazis' rise to power.

In the aftermath of the Japanese change of attitude towards a war against the Soviet Union, Soviet-Japanese economic relations improved. Shikao Matsumisha of the Commercial Affairs Bureau of the Foreign Office and Soviet foreign minister Molotov signaled mutual interest in an improvement of Japanese–Soviet trade relations in October 1939. The two countries agreed to more permanently settle the ongoing question of Japanese fishing in Soviet waters and the payments for the Chinese Eastern Railway in Manchukuo. The Soviet Union promised that significant amounts of the money received as part of these deals would be invested back into the purchase of Japanese goods.

The Japanese intelligence agencies and foreign service, which had previously supported separatism among the Soviet Union's ethnic minorities, also restricted their activities in this field as a result of the Soviet-Japanese rapprochement. Starting with the German-Soviet War, the Japanese loss of interest in war with the USSR had the consequence that Japan was unwilling to open up a second front against the Soviet Union to relieve German efforts, as Japan interpreted Germany's aggression as an insufficient reason to trigger the treaty. As a result of the Molotov–Ribbentrop Pact, there was a significant cooling of German–Japanese relations between late 1939 and the summer of 1940, but after Germany's victories in 1940, the elimination of the French and Dutch colonial powers caused Japan, interested in the acquisition of the colonies in question, to approach Germany again.

== During World War II ==
All further additions to the Anti-Comintern Pact were after 1 September 1939 and thus during World War II. The supposed purpose of the pact, as a defensive coalition against communism to counteract the potential of Soviet aggression, became outdated when most of its European member states became engaged in the German–Soviet War.

=== Effect of German military victories in the Westfeldzug ===
In March 1940, Joachim von Ribbentrop once again set about mobilizing Italy, the Soviet Union and especially Japan for his vision of a four-power coalition against the British Empire. In June 1940, the overwhelming German victories in the Westfeldzug ("Western Campaign") saw the defeat of France, Belgium and the Netherlands. With French Indochina and the Dutch East Indies now effectively defenseless, the Tokyo government now felt enticed to once again diplomatically approach Germany, which it had previously distanced itself from after the German quid pro quo with the USSR. The Germans had also won some support with the Japanese ambassadors in Berlin and Rome, Hiroshi Ōshima and Toshio Shiratori, who were swayed by Germany's successes in the Polish campaign and started supporting Ribbentrop's diplomatic agenda.

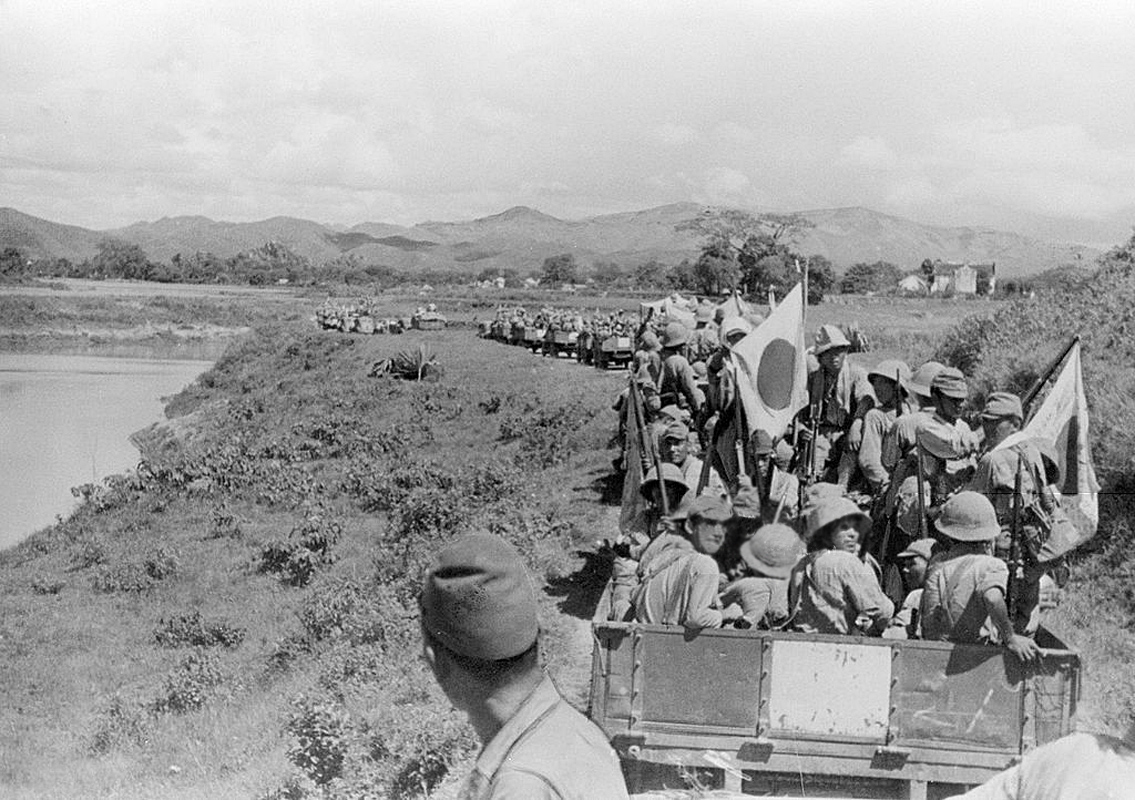
Japanese advance to Lạng Sơn in French Indochina in 1940.

Japan, concerned that Germany might actually take the side of France and the Netherlands, possibly then reshaped to be German vassal states, in the colonial question, sought to assure Germany's support for a Japanese annexation of French and Dutch colonies in South East Asia. Ribbentrop was indeed willing to support such Japanese annexations, which had been part of his initial idea regarding the four-power pact's advantages from the Japanese perspective. He painted Japanese acquisitions in East Asia as preparations for a world order where all of Afro-Eurasia would be divided between Germany, Italy, Japan and the Soviet Union.

Again, Ribbentrop thus tried to realize his vision of a four-power coalition directed against the United Kingdom. With France eliminated and the Battle of Britain going in Britain's favor, it became more and more clear that the United Kingdom, although on the back foot, would neither seek a truce nor be knocked out by German invasion. As a result, the role of the still neutral United States and the American support for the UK became more and more important for the conduct of Germany's war effort. Ribbentrop still deluded himself that cooperation with the Soviet Union could be permanent or at least last until the war with the United Kingdom had concluded. This opinion was not shared by Adolf Hitler, who still viewed the 'Jewish-Bolshevist' Soviet Union as Germany's inevitable final enemy.

=== Tripartite Pact ===
Differences between Germany and Japan, including the Japanese war in China, economic differences, and the Molotov–Ribbentrop Pact, led to a growing distance between Germany and Japan. Germany's victories over the European allies in 1940 led to a desire for a reconciliation between the parties. This came to pass as part of the Tripartite Pact of 27 September 1940. However, the Japanese distrust in the German partner remained, and Japan avoided entanglement in Germany's eventual war against the Soviet Union to fully focus on its own struggle in China. In the Tripartite Pact, the Germans and Italians recognized the Japanese leadership in East Asia, and Japan conversely recognized German and Italian leadership in Europe.

=== Extension of the pact ===
Extension protocol of the Anti-Comintern Pact [25 November 1941]

The Government of the German Reich, the Royal Italian Government and the Imperial Japanese Government as well as the Royal Hungarian Government, the Imperial Government of Manchukuo and the Spanish Government,

in the recognition, that the actions taken by them for the protection against the Communist Internationale have yielded the best of results,

as well as in the conviction, that the matching interests of their countries continues to demand tight cooperation against the common enemy,

have decided, to prolong the duration of the mentioned agreements, and have for this purpose agreed on the following provisions:

1. The pact against the Communist Internationale, that results from the agreement and additional protocol of 25 November 1936 as well as the protocol of 6 November 1937 and that Hungary did join by the protocol of 24 February 1939, Manchukuo by the protocol of 24 February 1939 and Spain by the protocol of 27 March 1939, is extended by five years, starting from 25 November 1941.

2. The States, that on the invitation of the German Reich, the Royal Italian Government or the Imperial Japanese Government as the initial signatories of the pact against the Communist Internationale intend to join this pact, will transmit their declarations of accession in writing to the Government of the German Reich, which will then in turn inform the other signatory States of the reception of these declarations. The accession goes into force on the day of the reception of the declaration of accession by the Government of the German Reich.

3. (1) The present protocol is written in the German, Italian and Japanese languages, and all three versions are regarded as the original versions. It becomes effective the day of signing.

(2) The high signatory States will in time notify each other before the expiration of the duration outlined in Article 1 with regards to the further design of their cooperation.

— German Federal Archives. 1937–1941; Die Kriegsjahre; 6 : 15. September bis 11. Dezember 1941. Akten zur deutschen auswärtigen Politik 1918–1945 aus dem Archiv des Auswärtigen Amtes (in German). D-13,2. Göttingen: Vandenhoeck + Ruprecht. pp. 671–672.

The Anti-Comintern Pact was scheduled to be renewed on 25 November 1941, as its five-year lifespan since 25 November 1936 was about to run out. One of Germany's primary aims was to keep Japan close and to encourage Japan to intervene in the German–Soviet War on Germany's side, but Japan refused to do so for the rest of the war. The Soviet–Japanese Neutrality Pact, signed in April 1941, would hold up until August 1945, when the Soviet Union violated the 5-year pact and invaded Japanese Manchuria.

The convention of the various signatories between 24 and 25 November 1941 in Berlin that led to the renewal of the pact was described by Ciano in his diaries as affirmation of the Germans as "masters of the house" within the Axis Powers. Attendants included Galeazzo Ciano of Italy, Serrano Suñer of Spain, László Bárdossy of Hungary and Mihai Antonescu of Romania, among others.

The extension protocol was signed on 25 November 1941 and bears the signatures of representatives of the six previous signatories: Ribbentrop (Germany), Ōshima (Japan), Ciano (Italy), Bárdossy (Hungary), Lü Yiwen (Manchukuo), and Suñer (Spain). The previous signatories rejoined the pact.

- Germany
- Japan
- Italy
- Hungary
- Manchukuo
- Spain

In addition, several new countries that had not done so before 25 November 1941 joined the Anti-Comintern Pact. China under Wang Jingwei submitted its signature ahead of time on 22 November 1941, the other countries submitted theirs on the day of signing, the 25th. (Note: Files of the countries' entries in the German archives, by country: Bulgaria (2871/D 564 636), Croatia (2871/D 564 639), Denmark (2871/D 564 637), Finland (2871/D 564 638), Romania (2871/D 564 643), Slovakia (2871/D 564 644).)

- Bulgaria
- Croatia
- Denmark
- Finland
- Nanjing China
- Romania
- Slovakia

The reaction to the extension in the German state-controlled press, unlike with the previous protocol, was very cold towards Japan and instead emphasized the sacrifices and successes of the European Axis against the Soviet Union in the German–Soviet War. This would not change significantly until 7 December 1941, when the Japanese attacked Pearl Harbor.

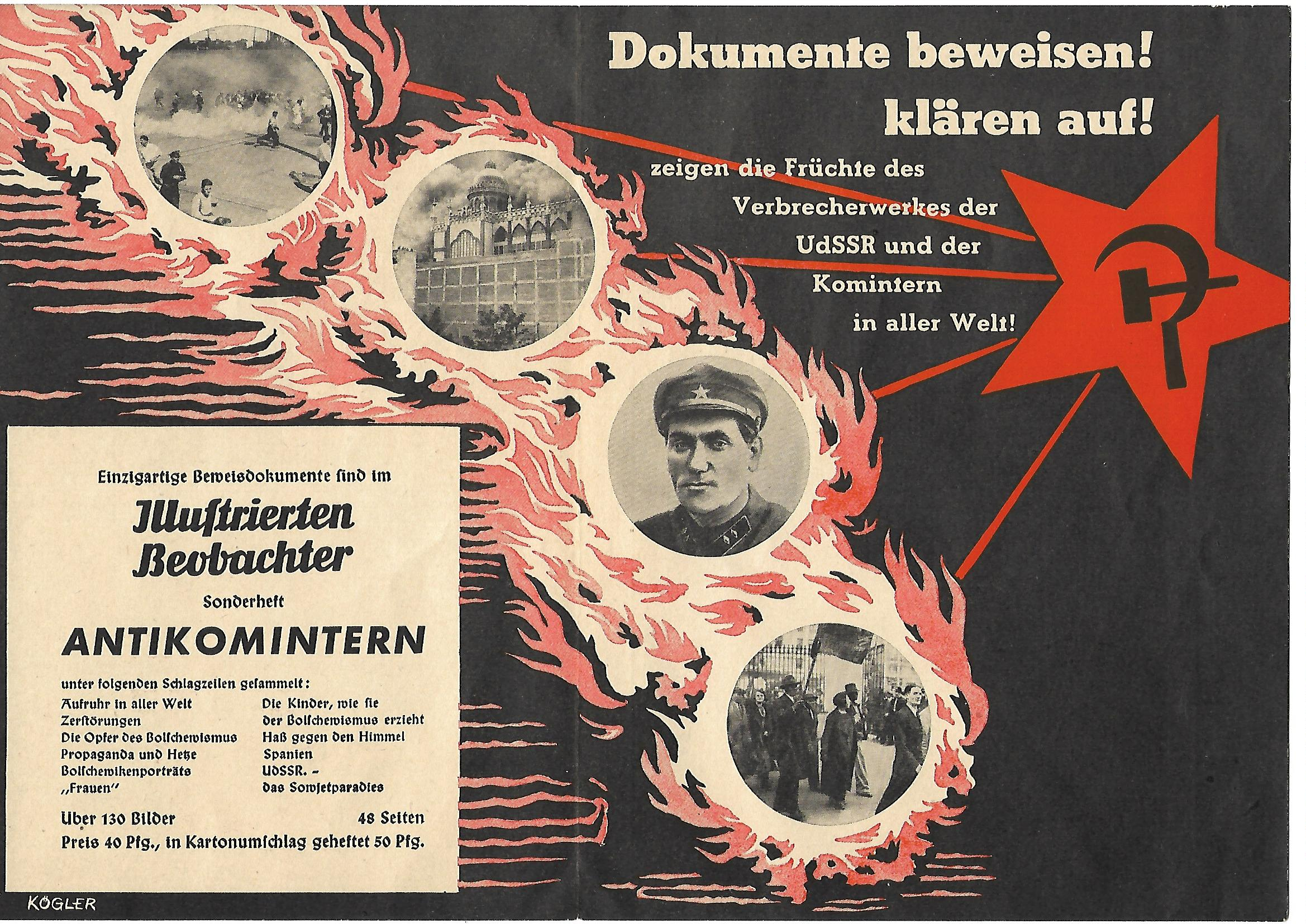
Anti-Comintern brochure prepared and handed out

==== Bulgaria ====
Bulgaria had been a country that was stuck between its own expansionist ambitions in the Balkans for which it relied on Italian and German military assistance and diplomatic support, while also trying to avoid major entanglement in Axis operations. Its leader Boris III, hailed as a "liberator czar" and a unifier of lost Bulgarian territories, could only achieve this status due to the military support of the Axis armies, but was intent in 1941 on avoiding Bulgarian involvement in the German–Soviet War on the Eastern Front. This was successful and Bulgarian troops did not participate in Operation Barbarossa, but the permanence of Bulgaria's territorial claims remained completely at the mercy of the Axis Powers, as Germany in particular was hesitant to view any territorial settlement in the Balkans after the Axis victories over Greece and Yugoslavia as final. As a result, Bulgaria was forced to please the German partner as much as possible while avoiding the final step of open hostilities against the Soviet Union.

As part of this pro-German position, Bulgaria was essentially forced into membership in the Anti-Comintern Pact in November 1941. Soon after, on 13 December, the country declared war on the United Kingdom and the United States. Bulgaria tried to maintain neutrality towards the Soviet Union until the end, but after Romania switched sides in favor of the Allies and allowed the Red Army to pass through Romanian territory to invade Bulgaria, the 1944 Bulgarian coup d'état paved the way to the People's Republic of Bulgaria. Tsar Simeon II's regents were executed.

==== Croatia ====
Croatia, Germany's most important partner on the Balkans during the anti-partisan campaigns, had been created in 1941 following the German occupation of Yugoslavia. It joined the Anti-Comintern Pact in November 1941. Such an accession was done with the goal to legitimize the Croatian state and make it look more independent, but also to take a clear stand against the Soviet Union.

==== Denmark ====
Denmark had, along with Norway, been occupied by Germany in the wake of Operation Weserübung that started on 9 April 1940. The government in Copenhagen responded to the German assault by having the Danish army stand down and accepting what was framed by Germany as protective occupation. The Danish decision was vastly different from the Norwegian one, as the government in Oslo chose to fight rather than to surrender, and as a result, the German occupation of Denmark was among the lightest of any of the German occupations in Europe. Still, any notion of Danish independence was merely a sham for the purpose of foreign propaganda, and the German authorities watched their Danish counterparts closely.

While there was a considerable spectrum of sympathy for the German cause among the Danish public, most Danish civilians resented their occupiers and the German military authorities doubted Danish compliance and loyalty. German attempts to improve their standing in public opinion in Denmark, through measures such as the establishment of the Danish-German Society with Peter Knutzen as chairman, were unsuccessful. The Danish government requested four key exemptions specific to Denmark.

- Denmark takes up no military obligations.
- Anti-communist action in Denmark should be limited to police operations.
- The treaty should be limited to Danish territory.
- Denmark will remain neutral in World War II.

The Germans, somewhat unhappy with these requests, moved them into a secret addendum as a compromise, making Denmark appear as a full member of the pact from the outside. This damaged the international reputation of the Danish civilian government among the Allies.

==== Finland ====
The status of Finland during the Second World War remains controversial into the modern day, as historians debate whether Finland was an ally of the Axis Powers, or as claimed by the wartime Finnish government, just in a state of co-belligerence (Finnish: kanssasotija, Swedish: medkrigförande) with Germany in the Continuation War against the Soviet Union. Finnish entry into the Anti-Comintern Pact on 25 November 1941, alongside other elements such as Finland's explicit acknowledgement of having been an ally of "Hitlerite Germany" in the 1947 Paris Peace Treaty, form the case in favour of arguing that Finland was an ally of the Axis Powers.

==== Nanjing China ====
The "Reorganized National Government of the Republic of China," also referred to as "China-Nanjing" or the Wang Jingwei regime, a Japanese puppet state established in Nanjing by the defeated Nationalist Party politician Wang Jingwei in March 1940, joined the Anti-Comintern Pact on 25 November 1941. It had submitted its signature to the treaty ahead of time, on 22 November.

==== Romania ====
Romania was Germany's most militarily important partner in the war against the Soviet Union, but its German partners had done little to actively earn that loyalty. Germany had in quick succession overseen three territorial losses in Romania, when it first awarded the Bessarabia region to the Soviet Union in the Molotov–Ribbentrop Pact, then granted large parts of the Transylvania region to Hungary as part of the Second Vienna Award, and finally approved of Bulgarian territorial gains in the Dobruja region as part of the Treaty of Craiova. Romania, under the leadership of the fascist Iron Guard, thus had its main enemies not only in the Soviet Union, but also among the ranks of the Axis Powers, especially in the form of Hungary. Still, the Iron Guard, which had before the territorial losses advocated a pro-German position, now viewed alignment with Germany as the only way to avoid another German intervention against Romania and in favor of Hungary. The Romanian participation in the Anti-Comintern Pact on 25 November 1941 thus arose out of the necessity to please the German partner and to further the Romanian campaign against the Soviet Union, to hopefully regain Bessarabia, and to make territorial acquisitions in Soviet Ukraine.

==== Slovakia ====
Slovakia, established in 1939 after the German-instigated dissolution of Czechoslovakia, joined the Anti-Comintern Pact on 25 November 1941.

== Suggested memberships ==
Between 1936 and 1945, the Axis Powers used the Anti-Comintern Pact as a diplomatic tool to increase their political and diplomatic leverage but were often unsuccessful.

=== Argentina, Brazil, and Chile ===
There were efforts by Germany to involve the South American ABC-Staaten (''ABC States"), consisting of Argentina, Brazil, and Chile, into the pact. Brazilian President Getúlio Vargas had established the new November 1937 constitution of the Estado Novo under the pretext of communist insurgency, and Brazil was thus considered the prime entry point for the Anti-Comintern Pact in South America. The Brazilian government promised that its domestic anti-communist conviction would continue, but declined entry into the Anti-Comintern Pact on the basis that it did not wish to diplomatically offend the United Kingdom or the United States. However, Brazilian minister Francisco Luiz da Silva Campos showed interest in German help for a Brazilian Anti-Comintern Exhibition similar to the ones that had already been held in Germany.

=== China ===
China was part of Ribbentrop's vision for the Anti-Comintern Pact in 1935, and had been courted by both Germany and Japan to join the Anti-Comintern Pact as early as 1936. By late 1935, Wang Jingwei was in favor of joining the pact, but Chiang Kai-shek was careful not to offend the Soviet Union, which was China's only potential partner in case of a Japanese attack. After serious consideration, the Chiang administration refused. They were unwilling to align with Japan without a retreat of Japanese forces from China. Such a retreat was rejected by Japan, which meant that China was unwilling to offend the Soviet Union, the only major power that would be able to effectively aid them in the case of a war against Japan. This war became reality in the following year. On 3 November 1938, Japanese Prime Minister Fumimaro Konoe in a public broadcast offered peace terms that included Chinese accession to the Anti-Comintern Pact.

Between December 1939 and March 1940, preliminary peace talks were carried out under the Japanese Kiri Project. The drafted terms involved Chinese accession to the Anti-Comintern Pact. The Chinese government stalled for time and did not give a definitive answer to the proposal. By 7 September, the Japanese side declared further negotiation useless and Kiri Project was terminated on 8 October 1940. Another attempt at exploratory peace talks was made by Qian Yongming for the Chinese side, who had two delegates with Yōsuke Matsuoka in Tokyo on 12 October 1940. Their proposal for peace between Japan and China and the unification of the Wang and Chiang governments also included the entry of the unified Chinese state into the Anti-Comintern Pact.

=== Czechoslovakia ===
Czechoslovakia's accession to the Anti-Comintern Pact was part of the German demands in the run-up to the establishment of the Protectorate. These demands were designed by Germany to be rejected.

=== Netherlands ===
The Netherlands were a candidate of choice for the Japanese for inclusion in the Anti-Comintern Pact. Japanese ambassador Iwao Yamaguchi hoped that Dutch concerns about the situation in China and the potential dissent of the ethnic Chinese inhabitants of the Dutch East Indies, as well as communist insurgents in the colony, would lead the Dutch government to attempt to stabilize the relationship with Japan through accession to the pact. Yamaguchi contacted the Dutch foreign minister Andries Cornelis Dirk de Graeff about the matter on 12 October 1936, but the Dutch government saw itself bound by public opinion to reject any diplomatic alignment with Japan, and De Graeff pointed out that communist activity in the Dutch East Indies was not an imminent threat. However, he was willing to at least negotiate an intelligence exchange with Japan for the purpose of anti-communist activity in Asia. A second meeting on 24 October 1936 saw De Graeff outline that only the Dutch East Indies should be included in any intelligence exchange, whereas Yamaguchi hoped to include the Dutch mainland for the purpose of thwarting Comintern operations in Amsterdam (and covertly influencing the Dutch newspapers to be less critical of Japan in their reporting). The following day, 25 October 1936, Tony Lovink contacted Yamaguchi about a potential Dutch policy in which not only communism but all political ideologies in the Dutch East Indies could be suppressed and supervised in cooperation with the Japanese. This was the first of many signs that the Dutch government was not greatly concerned about fighting communism, but was much rather concerned with suppressing the Indonesian independence movement in the Dutch East Indies. Although the Netherlands remained interested in secretive intelligence exchanges, the Dutch government was hesitant to officially undertake a diplomatic alignment with Japan, caused by the fear of domestic and diplomatic backlash.

=== Norway ===
As part of the German occupation of Norway and Norway's collaborationist Quisling regime, the accession of Quisling Norway to the Anti-Comintern Pact was discussed, most notably in the German Memorandum über die Neuordnung in Norwegen ("Memorandum Regarding the Reorganization of Norway"), issued in Oslo on 10 February 1942.

=== Poland ===
In 1935, Poland had been one of the countries that Ribbentrop had hoped to induce to join the pact. Poland was also a very desired partner in Japan, which viewed Germany and Poland as rather close because of their 1934 Non-Aggression Pact and which viewed Poland as very committed in its anti-communist and anti-Soviet stances. When Ribbentrop and Neurath were in contact with Józef Lipski and Józef Beck about German-Polish anti-communist cooperation, Beck rejected a Polish entry into the Anti-Comintern Pact as impractical. The Polish entry into the Anti-Comintern Pact was part of the eight-point plan presented to Poland by Joachim von Ribbentrop. Poland rejected this proposal. The reasons for Poland's rejection of the proposal were the Polish desire for a diplomatic equidistance between Germany and the Soviet Union, as well as military concerns about encroaching encirclement by Germany after the dissolution of Czechoslovakia.

=== Portugal ===
Portugal was of interest as a possible member state, especially after Spain joined. As one of the only three countries to have voted against the Soviet Union's entry into the League of Nations on 18 September 1934 (in addition to the Netherlands and Switzerland), it had a well-established anti-Soviet record. However, its economic dependency on and long-standing diplomatic alliance with the United Kingdom made Portugal unlikely to accept an invitation to the Anti-Comintern Pact in the eyes of Oswald Baron von Hoyningen-Huene, the German ambassador to Portugal 1934–1945.

=== United Kingdom ===
British membership was part of Ribbentrop's original design for the Anti-Comintern Pact in October 1935. When Joachim von Ribbentrop became ambassador to the United Kingdom in 1936, Hitler made clear to him that it was his 'greatest wish' to welcome Britain into the Anti-Comintern Pact. Ribbentrop was sceptical of Hitler's ambition, but placed some hope in King Edward VIII, who Ribbentrop perceived to be friendly to Germany. When asked on 15 November 1937 whether the British government had received an invitation to the Anti-Comintern Pact, Under-Secretary for Foreign Affairs Lord Cranborne answered that no such invitation had taken place.

=== Yugoslavia ===
Yugoslavia was Axis-friendly during the tenure of Milan Stojadinović as Prime Minister, and Germany and Italy were optimistic about its accession in January 1939. Stojadinović was however ousted in February 1939, and the subsequent Cvetković administration was more cautious and non-aligned. The Cvetković administration, pressured by the diplomatic alignment of Romania, Hungary and Bulgaria with the Axis Powers, joined the Anti-Comintern Pact's successor, the Tripartite Pact, on 25 March 1941. in response, Chief of the General Staff Dušan Simović and other officers launched a coup d'état on 27 March, cancelling Yugoslavia's entry into the Tripartite Pact. In response, the Axis Powers initiated the invasion of Yugoslavia on 6 April.

== Legacy ==
The Anti-Comintern Pact ended up playing a significant role at the Nuremberg trials and was specifically mentioned in the verdict that sentenced Joachim von Ribbentrop to death.

=== Historical reception and historiography ===
Paul W. Schroeder, 1958

Another development, hardly dangerous in itself, but portentous of things to come, was the conclusion of an Anti-Comintern Pact between Japan and Germany in November 1936. Though it was ostensibly a limited agreement for exchange of information and consultation concerning Communist subversion, it served to give a tangible basis for the belief that Nazi Germany and Imperial Japan were very much alike and linked together.

— Paul W. Schroeder: The Axis Alliance and Japanese-American Relations 1941 (1958). ISBN 0801403715. p. 7.

American historian Paul W. Schroeder, professor emeritus of the University of Illinois, interprets the Anti-Comintern Pact in his 1958 book The Axis Alliance and Japanese-American Relations 1941 as a diplomatic statement by Germany and Japan that had no actual military value and was "hardly dangerous in itself". Schroeder also comments on the rather loose German-Japanese ties that resulted from the pact, as well as the lack of German and Japanese commitment towards the agreement. Schroeder's conclusion ultimately sees in the Anti-Comintern Pact a continuation of a pattern in Japanese foreign policy since the 1890s in which Japan was opportunistic in grasping at chances at expansion, as in the First Sino-Japanese War 1894, the Russo-Japanese War 1904 and the twenty-one demands of 1915.

Ruth Henig, 1985

The onward march of fascism was underlined by the anti-comintern pact concluded between Germany and Japan in November 1936, to combat the spread of communist regimes. It was ostensibly directed against the USSR, but the seemingly close relations established between the two governments also posed a serious threat to the British empire. This threat was magnified when Italy adhered to the pact in late 1937.

— Ruth Henig: The Origins of the Second World War 1933–1941. ISBN 0415332621. p. 30.

Ruth Henig, British historian and later politician for the Labour Party, noted in her 1985 book The Origins of the Second World War 1933–1941 the agreement's ideological component, in that the Anti-Comintern pact underlined the "onward march of fascism" in order "to combat the spread of communist regimes", but pointed out that a real threat from the pact also came to the liberal democratic United Kingdom. In a 2001 contribution to The Paris Peace Conference, 1919: Peace Without Victory, Henig also notes that the public in Germany, Italy, Japan and even the United Kingdom itself was largely uninterested in foreign policy and the assurance of international peace, and that those few individuals who took an active interest in global affairs often did so chauvinistically and nationalistically. Henig also commented that the interwar period 1918–1939 was marked by the breakup of old alliances (like the Anglo-Japanese Alliance and the Stresa Front).

Manfred Messerschmidt, 1990

The anti-Comintern pact of 25 November 1936 ... reflected a move away from China, contrary to the preferences of the military and business leaders, and also the uncertainty of Germany's plan as between Japan and Britain. The 'pact' was no more than an agreement to exchange information on the activities of the Third International, and the 'secret supplementary protocol' was merely a pledge of neutrality and consultation, not a military alliance. Thus, the anti-Comintern pact, like the Axis, was only a patching together of divergent political interests.

— MGFA: The Build-up of German Aggression (1990). ISBN 019822866X. p. 639.

As part of the German Bundeswehr's Military History Research Office's series Germany and the Second World War, German military historian Manfred Messerschmidt states in the first volume, The Build-up of German Aggression (1990), that the Anti-Comintern Pact, just like the Axis Powers as a whole, was just a "patching together of divergent political interests". Messerschmidt also comments on Hitler's ambivalence between including either Italy or the United Kingdom in the pact.

In regards to the role of Japan, Messerschmidt, like Schroeder, sees the Anti-Comintern Pact as a continuation of established Japanese policy, but also notes that Japan's internal political apparatus was so divided between the interests of the Japanese army, navy and government that almost by definition no action by the Tokyo leadership could be seen as any sort of unified opinion of the entire Japanese establishment. Messerschmidt also disagrees with the notion that Italy's accession to the pact necessarily gave it an anti-British thrust, but that Italian accession established a basis of the treaty in the first place. The interests of Germany and Japan were too different and the Japanese position after the beginning of the war against China in 1937 too weak to pose a threat to any enemy, Soviet Union or United Kingdom. As a result, Messerschmidt disagrees with the idea that the pact went from anti-Soviet to anti-British on the basis that it effectively already stopped being anti-Soviet as soon as Japan invaded China in June 1937, not when Italy joined the agreement in November of that same year.

Messerschmidt agrees that Hitler's support for Japan, which followed from Ribbentrop's agenda in the far east, was destined to hurt Anglo-German relations, whether Hitler intended it or not. The actions that Germany took that favored Japan and disfavored China included the cessation of aid deliveries to the Chiang government, the recall of advisors from China and open declarations of political support for Japanese actions starting in October 1937. All of these actions, according to Messerschmidt's argument, were bound to offend the pro-Chinese position of the United Kingdom.

Ian Kershaw, 2000

On 27 November 1936 Hitler approved what became known as the Anti-Comintern Pact (which Italy joined a year later), under whose main provision – in a secret protocol – neither party would assist the Soviet Union in any way in the event of it attacking either Germany or Japan. The pact was more important for its symbolism than for its actual provisions: the two most militaristic, expansionist powers in the world had found their way to each other. Though the pact was ostensibly defensive, it had hardly enhanced the prospects for peace on either side of the globe.

— Ian Kershaw: Hitler 1936–45: Nemesis. ISBN 0393049949. p. 27.

In his biography of Adolf Hitler, British historian Sir Ian Kershaw wrote in 2000 that Hitler's approval for the Anti-Comintern Pact marked the diplomatic union of "the two most militaristic, expansionist powers in the world", but that "[t]he pact was more important for its symbolism than for its actual provisions". Kershaw in his interpretation of the power structures within Nazi Germany is a proponent of the "working towards the Führer" thesis, in which, while Hitler was the guiding ideological figure in the German state whose favor all political actors within the German government (in case of the Anti-Comintern Pact: Ribbentrop) attempted to win, the dictator was in fact rather uninvolved in day-to-day governmental matters.

== See also ==
- German–Japanese industrial co-operation before and during World War II
- Germany–Japan relations
- Germany–Soviet Union relations, 1918–1941
- Monsun Gruppe
- Japan–Soviet Union relations
- Japanese military modernization of 1868–1931
- Specific events
  - Franco-Soviet Treaty of Mutual Assistance (27 March 1936)
  - Soviet–Japanese Border War (May–September 1939)
  - Pact of Steel (22 May 1939)
  - Molotov–Ribbentrop Pact (23 August 1939)
  - Tripartite Pact (27 September 1940)
  - Soviet–Japanese Neutrality Pact (13 April 1941)
  - Soviet invasion of Manchuria (August 1945)

== Sources ==
=== Primary sources ===
- Akten zur deutschen auswärtigen Politik
  - Lambert, Margaret; et al., eds. (1973). 14. Juni bis 31. Oktober 1934. Akten zur deutschen auswärtigen Politik 1918–1945 (in German). C-3. Göttingen: Vandenhoeck + Ruprecht.
  - Lambert, Margaret; et al., eds. (1977). 26. Mai bis 31. Oktober 1936. Akten zur deutschen auswärtigen Politik 1918–1945 (in German). C-5-2. Göttingen: Vandenhoeck + Ruprecht.
  - Sontag, Raymond James; et al., eds. (1950). Von Neurath zu Ribbentrop. September 1937 – September 1938. Akten zur deutschen auswärtigen Politik 1918–1945 (in German). D-1. Göttingen: Vandenhoeck + Ruprecht.
  - Schmitt, Bernadotte E.; et al., eds. (1951). Deutschland und der Spanische Bürgerkrieg. Akten zur deutschen auswärtigen Politik 1918–1945 (in German). D-3. Göttingen: Vandenhoeck + Ruprecht.
  - Schmitt, Bernadotte E.; et al., eds. (1953). Polen, Südosteuropa, Lateinamerika, Klein- und Mittelstaaten. Akten zur deutschen Auswärtigen Politik 1918–1945 (in German). D-5. Göttingen: Vandenhoeck + Ruprecht.
  - Sweet, Paul R.; et al., eds. (1956). Die letzten Wochen vor Kriegsausbruch: 9. August bis 3. September 1939. Akten zur deutschen Auswärtigen Politik 1918–1945 (in German). D-7. Göttingen: Vandenhoeck + Ruprecht.
  - Smyth, Howard M.; et al., eds. (1970). 15. September bis 11. Dezember 1941. Akten zur deutschen auswärtigen Politik 1918–1945 (in German). D-13-2. Vandenhoeck + Ruprecht.
  - Rothfeld, Hans; et al., eds. (1969). 12. Dezember 1941 bis 28. Februar 1942. Akten zur deutschen auswärtigen Politik 1918–1945 (in German). E-1. Göttingen: Vandenhoeck + Ruprecht.
- Ciano, Galeazzo (1980). 1937–1938: Diario (in Italian). Milan: Cappelli Editore.
- Ciano, Galeazzo (2001). Gibson, Hugh (ed.). The Ciano Diaries. Simon Publications. ISBN 1931313741.
- Goebbels, Joseph (2003) [1992]. Reuth, Ralf Georg (ed.). Joseph Goebbels: Tagebücher 1924–1945 (in German) (3rd ed.). Munich: Piper Verlag GmbH. ISBN 3492214118.
- Hitler, Adolf (1943) [1925]. Mein Kampf (in German). Leipzig: August Pries GmbH.
- Horthy, Miklós; Simon, Andrew L.; Bowden, Ilona (2000) [1953]. Admiral Nicholas Horthy: Memoirs. Safety Harbor: Simon Publications. ISBN 0966573439. LCCN 00--10118.
- Hull, Cordell (1948). The Memoirs of Cordell Hull. 2. Hodder & Stoughton.
- Matsuoka, Yōsuke (1937). 日独防共協定の意義 [The significance of the Anti-Comintern Pact] (in Japanese). 第一出版社.
- Rosinger, Lawrence (1940). "U.S.S.R. and Japan to Improve Trade Relations". Far Eastern Survey. 9 (3): 33–35. doi:10.2307/3021550. JSTOR 3021550.
- Shigemitsu, Mamoru (1958). Japan and her Destiny: My Struggle for Peace. New York CIty: E.P. Dutton & Co.
- Trial of the Major War Criminals before the International Military Tribunal
  - Trial of the Major War Criminals before the International Military Tribunal. 1. Nuremberg: International Military Tribunal. 1947.
  - Trial of the Major War Criminals before the International Military Tribunal. 3. Nuremberg: International Military Tribunal. 1947.
  - Trial of the Major War Criminals before the International Military Tribunal. 10. Nuremberg: International Military Tribunal. 1947.
- Zeitschrift für Politik: "Europäische Einheit im Zeichen des Antikominternpaktes". Zeitschrift für Politik (in German). 32 (1): 54–56. 1942. JSTOR 43347859.

=== Secondary sources ===
- Barnhart, Michael A. (1987). Japan Prepares for Total War: The Search for Economic Security, 1919–1941. Ithaca, NY: Cornell University Press. ISBN 9780801495298.
- Benson, Leslie (2001). Yugoslavia: A Concise History. Hampshire: Palgrave Macmillan. ISBN 0333792416.
- Bieber, Hans-Joachim (2014). SS und Samurai: Deutsch-japanische Kulturbeziehungen 1933–1945. Iudicium. ISBN 9783862050437.
- Bix, Herbert P. (2007) [2000]. Hirohito and the Making of Modern Japan. New York City: HarperCollins e-books. ISBN 9780061570742.
- Borejsza, Jerzy W. (1981). "Die Rivalität zwischen Faschismus und Nationalsozialismus in Ostmitteleuropa"(PDF). Vierteljahrshefte für Zeitgeschichte (in German). 29/4: 579–614.
- Bosworth, Richard J. B.; Maiolo, Joseph A., eds. (2015). Politics and Ideology. The Cambridge History of the Second World War. 2. Cambridge: Cambridge University Press. ISBN 9781107034075.
- Boyce, Robert; Robertson, Esmonde M., eds. (1989). Paths to War: New Essays on the Origins of the Second World War. Houndmills: Macmillan. ISBN 9781349203338.
- Boyd, Carl (1977). "The Role of Hiroshi Ōshima in the Preparation of the Anti-Comintern Pact". Journal of Asian History. 11 (1): 49–71.
- Boyd, Carl (1981). "The Berlin-Tokyo Axis and Japanese Military Initiative". Modern Asian Studies. 15 (2): 311–338.
- Cattaruzza, Marina (2013). Cohen, Gary B. (ed.). "Territorial Revisionism and the Allies of Germany in the Second World War". Austrian and Habsburg Studies (eBook ed.). 15. ISBN 9780857457394.
- Chapman, John W. M. (April 1987). "A Dance on Eggs: Intelligence and the 'Anti-Comintern'". Journal of Contemporary History. 22(2): 333–372.
- Duara, Prasenjit (2003). Sovereignty and Authenticity: Manchukuo and the East Asian Modern. Oxford: Rowman & Littlefield Publishers. ISBN 0742525775.
- Ferris, John; Mawdsley, Evan, eds. (2015). Fighting the War. The Cambridge History of the Second World War. 1. Cambridge: Cambridge University Press. ISBN 9781107038929.
- Germany and the Second World War book series
  - Deist, Wilhelm; et al. (1990). The Build-up of German Aggression. Germany and the Second World War. 1. Translated by Falla, P. S. Oxford: Clarendon Press. ISBN 019822866X.
  - Boog, Horst; et al. (1998). The Attack on the Soviet Union. Germany and the Second World War. 4. Oxford: Clarendon Press. ISBN 0198228864.
  - Kroener, Bernhard R.; et al. (2000). Organization and Mobilization of the German Sphere of Power: Wartime administration, economy, and manpower resources 1939–1941. Germany and the Second World War. 5–1. Oxford: Clarendon Press. ISBN 0198228872.
  - Boog, Horst; et al. (2001). The Global War: Widening of the Conflict into a World War and the Shift of the Initiative 1941–1943. Germany and the Second World War. 6. Translated by Osers, Ewald. Oxford: Clarendon Press.
- Griesheimer, Anna (2008). Deutschland in der italienischen Literatur seit dem Ende des Zweiten Weltkrieges (in German). Passau: University of Passau.
- Gusso, Massimo (2022). Italia e Giappone: dal Patto Anticomintern alla dichiarazione di guerra del luglio 1945. Inquiete convergenze, geopolitica, diplomazia, conflitti globali e drammi individuali (1934–1952). Edizioni Ca' Foscari, Venice.
- Haslam, Jonathan (1984). Davies, R.W. (ed.). The Soviet Union and the Struggle for Collective Security in Europe, 1933–39. Studies in Soviet History and Society. The MacMillan Press Ltd. ISBN 0198731868.
- Henig, Ruth (2005) [1985]. The Origins of the Second World War 1933–1941. London: Routledge Taylor & Francis Group. ISBN 0415332621.
- Hofer, Walther, ed. (1982) [1977]. Der Nationalsozialismus: Dokumente 1933–1945 (in German). Frankfurt/Main: Fischer Taschenbuch Verlag. ISBN 3596260841.
- Holbraad, Carsten (2017). Danish Reactions to German Occupation: History and Historiography. London: UCL Press. ISBN 9781911307495.
- Ishida, Ken (2018). Japan, Italy and the Road to the Tripartite Alliance. Palgrave Macmillan. ISBN 9783319962238. LCCN 2018-948205.
- Jelavich, Barbara (1983). Twentieth Century. History of the Balkans. 2. Cambridge: Cambridge University Press. ISBN 9780521274593.
- Kershaw, Ian (2000). Hitler: 1936–45 – Nemesis. New York City: W. W. Norton & Company. ISBN 0393049949.
- Kershaw, Ian (2008). Hitler, the Germans and the Final Solution. New Haven: Yale University Press. ISBN 9780300124279.
- Kleßmann, Christoph, ed. (1989). September 1939: Krieg, Besatzung und Widerstand in Polen (in German). Göttingen: Vandenhoeck & Ruprecht.
- Koch, Hannsjoachim W., ed. (1985). Aspects of the Third Reich. Houndmills: Macmillan. ISBN 9781349178919.
- Kochanski, Halik (2012). The Eagle Unbowed: Poland and the Poles in the Second World War. Cambridge, Massachusetts: Harvard University Press. ISBN 0674284003.
- Lu, David John (2002). Agony of Choice: Matsuoka Yōsuke and the Rise and Fall of the Japanese Empire. Lexington Books. ISBN 9780739104583.
- MacDonald, Callum A. (1981). The United States, Britain and Appeasement 1936–1945. London: Macmillan Press Limited. ISBN 9781349165698.
- Mallett, Robert (2003). Mussolini and the Origins of the Second World War, 1933–1940. New York City: Palgrave Macmillan. ISBN 0333748158.
- Martin, Bernd (1970). "Zur Vorgeschichte des deutsch-japanischen Kriegsbündnisses". Wissenschaft und Unterricht (in German). 21: 606–615.
- Michalka, Wolfgang (1980). Ribbentrop und die deutsche Weltpolitik (in German). Munich: Wilhelm Fink Verlag. ISBN 3770514009.
- Mitter, Rana (2013). Forgotten Ally: China's World War II, 1937–1945. Boston: Houghton Mifflin Harcourt. ISBN 9780547840567.
- Morley, James William (ed.). Deterrent Diplomacy: Japan, Germany and the USSR, 1935–1940: Selected Translations from Taiheiyō sensō e no michi, kaisen gaikō shi. Translated by Baerwald, Hans. New York City: Columbia University Press. ISBN 9780231089692.
- von zur Mühlen, Patrik (1973). "Japan und die sowjetische Nationalitätenfrage am Vorabend und während des Zweiten Weltkrieges". Vierteljahrshefte für Zeitgeschichte (in German). 21/3: 325–333.
- Nish, Ian; Kibata, Yoichi, eds. (2000). The Political-Diplomatic Dimension, 1931–2000. The History of Anglo-Japanese Relations, 1600–2000. 2. Houndmills: Palgrave Macmillan. ISBN 9781403919670.
- Osmanczyk, Edmund J. (1990) [1985]. The Encyclopedia of The United Nations and International Relations(2nd ed.). Bristol: Taylor and Francis. ISBN 0850668336.
- Presseisen, Ernst L. (1958). Germany and Japan: A Study in Totalitarian Diplomacy 1933–1941. Den Haag: Springer-Science + Business Media. doi:10.1007/978-94-017-6590-9. ISBN 9789401765909.
- Schroeder, Paul W. (1958). The Axis Alliance and Japanese-American Relations 1941. Cornell University Press. ISBN 0801403715.
- Shimazu, Naoko (1998). Japan, Race, and Equality: The Racial Equality Proposal of 1919. ISBN 9780203207178.
- Shirer, William L. (1960). The Rise and Fall of the Third Reich: A History of Nazi Germany (1st ed.). New York: Simon and Schuster, Inc. LCCN 60--6729.
- Spector, Robert M. (2005). World Without Civilization: Mass Murder and the Holocaust, History, and Analysis. Lanham: University Press of America. ISBN 0761829636.
- So, Wai-Chor (April 2002). "The Making of the Guomindang's Japan Policy, 1932–1937: The Roles of Chiang Kai-Shek and Wang Jingwei". Modern China. Sage Publications. 28 (2): 213–252. JSTOR 3181354.
- Steiner, Zara (2011). The Triumph of the Dark: European International History 1933–1939. Oxford University Press. ISBN 9780199212002.
- Stratman, George John (1970). Germany's diplomatic relations with Japan 1933–1941. Graduate Student Theses, Dissertations, & Professional Papers. 2450. University of Montana.
- Tomasevich, Jozo (2001). War and Revolution in Yugoslavia, 1941–1945. Stanford: Stanford University Press. ISBN 0804736154.
- Vehviläinen, Olli (2002). Finland in the Second World War: Between Germany and Russia. Translated by McAlestar, Gerard. New York City: palgrave. ISBN 0333801490.
- Waddington, Lorna L. (2007). "The Anti-Komintern and Nazi Anti-Bolshevik Propaganda in the 1930s". Journal of Contemporary History. 42(4): 573–594. ISSN 0022–0094.
- Weinberg, Gerhard L. (1954). "Die geheimen Abkommen zum Antikominternpakt. Dokumentation". Vierteljahrshefte für Zeitgeschichte (in German). 1954/2: 193–201.
- Weinberg, Gerhard L. (1970). The Foreign Policy of Hitler's Germany Diplomatic Revolution in Europe 1933–36. Chicago: University of Chicago Press. ISBN 0226885097.
- Winchester, Betty Jo (1973). "Hungary and the 'Third Europe'". Slavic Review. Cambridge University Press. 32 (4): 741–756. doi:10.2307/2495494. JSTOR 2495494.
