= Wang Tifu =

- Born: June 29, 1911; Jilin, Jilin, China
- Died: July 13, 2001 (aged 90); Harbin, Heilongjiang, China

Wang Tifu (Simplified Chinese: 王替夫) was a Chinese diplomat for Manchukuo. He worked for the Legation of Manchukuo in Germany from 1938 to 1944 in Berlin as the secretary of Minister Lü Yiwen (吕宜文). During his tenure, he used his authority to help the Jewish refugees in Germany. He issued about 12,000 Manchukuo visas to the Jewish people between the spring of 1939 and May 1940 to allow them to cross Manchukuo in order to flee from the Holocaust.

== Early life ==
Wang Tifu was born in 1911 in a small village in Jilin. His family moved to Jilin City when he was 10 years old. He studied English in an elementary school there and Russian in a middle school. After graduating from high school, he enrolled in Harbin Institute of Technology. In opposition to his father's plan for him to study engineering, he went on to study law instead. While in university, Wang also studied Japanese and German. His proficiency in five languages enabled him to open a translation agency for extra cash during the study.

== Mukden Incident ==
On September 18, 1931, Japan initiated the Mukden Incident and occupied Manchuria. This inspired Wang Tifu to join the patriotic movement with other university students. As a part of the movement, they visited a heroic figure, Ma Zhanshan, a Chinese general who actively resisted the Japanese occupation of Manchuria. Wang and several students took a photo with Ma after the visit, but the photo was by chance reviewed by the Japanese military official. The Japanese military was angry about students' patriotic sentiments, and they later arrested and imprisoned the students present in that photo, including Wang Tifu.

In the prison, Wang's linguistic ability caught the attention of the Japanese officials because he could speak Japanese proficiently. They approached Wang to persuade him to work with Japan; under the threat of death Wang was forced to cooperate with the Japanese, although he expressed shame for having done so.

== Life as a diplomat ==
In December 1932, Wang was appointed as a diplomat at the Consulate-General of Manchukuo in Chita, the Soviet Union. He was the secretary of the Consul General Li Yuan (李垣). He spent several years in Chita and returned to Manchukuo in 1936.

In September 1936, Wang began his new position in the Representative Office of Manchukuo in Dalian. His main duty was to issue visas to those who wanted to enter Manchukuo.

In late 1938, the Japanese reassigned Wang to the Legation of Manchukuo in Germany. His position was the secretary of the minister. In February, 1939, Wang accompanied Minister Lü Yiwen to present the credentials to Hitler. In the luncheon, Hitler said that he was interested in the soybeans in Manchukuo and hoped to develop a trade relationship between the two countries.

From 1941 to 1943, Wang also visited Romania, Bulgaria, Hungary and Slovakia with Minister Lü to present the credentials.

== Visa issuance ==
Jewish people under the ruling of Nazi Germany were to be treated indiscriminately. In 1938, the Kristallnacht reflected the extent of unpopularity of Jewish presence in Germany. At that time, one way to escape from the atrocity was to travel to the U.S.; however, Jewish people could not directly go to U.S. from Germany. They must travel to Manchukuo first, and then they had to go to Shanghai and depart from Shanghai to the U.S. Entering Manchukuo required a valid visa, and Wang Tifu's duty was to issue Manchukuo visas to applicants. Between the spring of 1939 and May 1940, he issued approximately 12,000 visas to Jewish people.

In mid-1939, German Minister of Foreign Affairs Joachim von Ribbentrop met with Lü Yiwen and required Manchukuo to issue visas for the Jewish people who wanted to leave Germany for the U.S. This action was a part of the plan that eliminated the existence of Jewish people in Germany. Minister Lü was unpleasant with this unexpected request from Germany, but he appointed Wang to take in charge of this task. For Wang Tifu, he accepted the task without hesitation and believed that it was a relief for him as he has witnessed the German atrocities against Jewish people and he felt sympathetic towards them.

On June 10, 1939, Wang started to issue visas with his assistant. He recalled that he only had one thought in his mind at that time: issuing as many visas as possible; after two months, he had issued over 7,000 visas.

One day in September 1939, Lü Yiwen told Wang that the process of visa issuance should cease now as a word from Ribbentrop. Wang did not follow this instruction and insisted on issuing visas because he understood the consequences faced by Jewish people. He persuaded the Minister not to give up the chance of saving more lives. Wang and Lü then decided to secretly issue visas to more Jewish people. Their diplomatic identity could help them to be immune from Gestapo's arrest.

Since the work became underground, the number of visas being issued every month dropped dramatically. Sometimes Wang could only issue less than a hundred visas a week, and from October 1939 to May 1940, Wang had issued another 5,000 visas to Jewish people.

In June 1940, Lü asked Wang to accompany him to visit some European countries and present the credentials. Thus, the visa issuance work also stopped at this point.

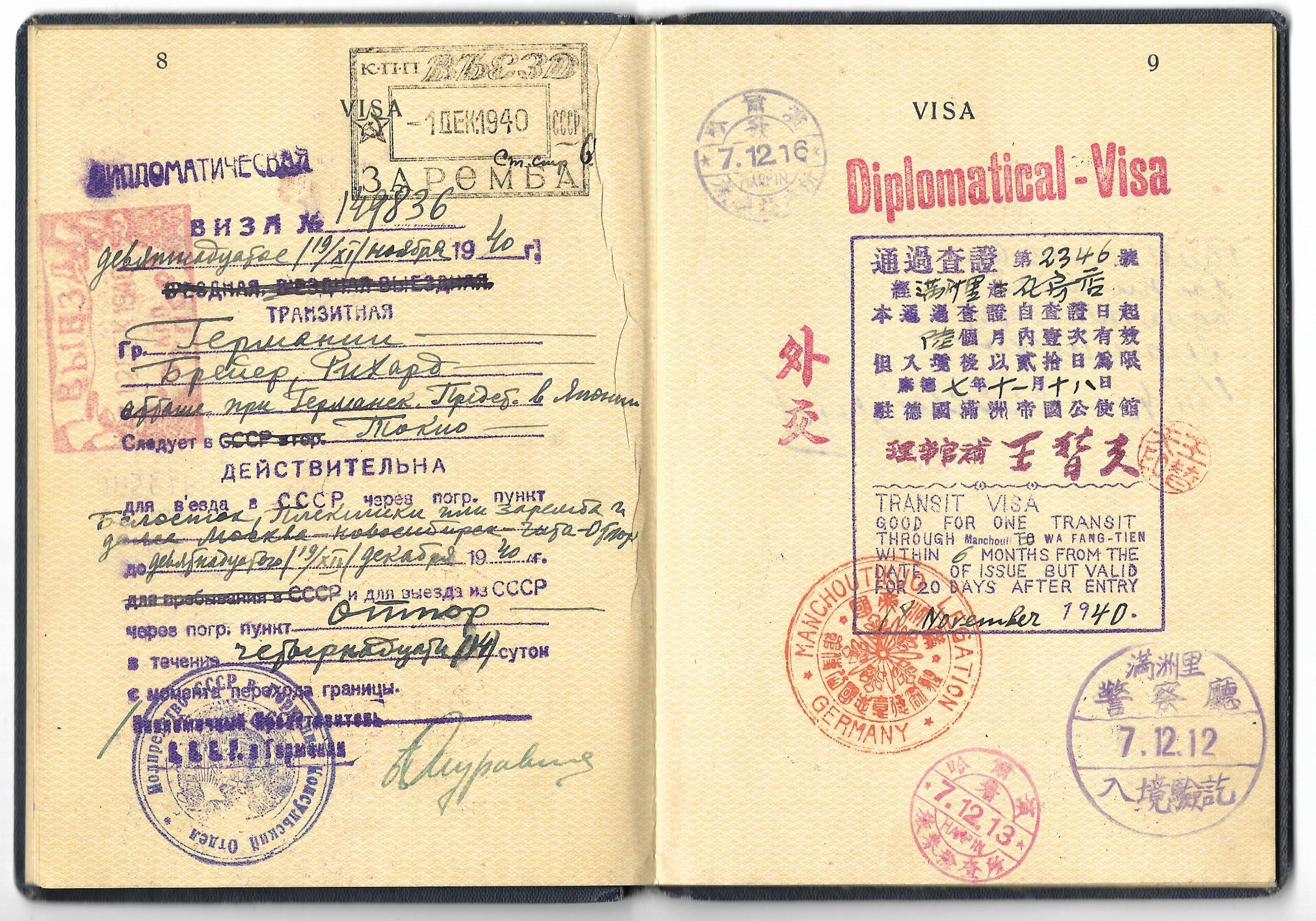
Diplomatic visa issued by Wang Tifu in Berlin, 1940.

== After the war ==
In July 1944, Wang Tifu finished his work as a diplomat in Germany and returned to Xinjing, the capital of Manchukuo, after several weeks of travelling. He was appointed a position in the Ministry of Foreign Affairs of Manchukuo, but this position was terminated in August 1945 following the surrender of Japan. Shortly thereafter, the Soviet army entered Xinjing and started to maintain its control of the city. Wang Tifu was treated kindly by the Russian at first because of his significant position in the Manchukuo government and his brilliant linguistic skill. When the Kuomintang arrived at Xinjing for the power transition, Chiang Ching-kuo told Wang that his past contribution to the restoration of order in former Manchukuo could reduce the penalty of being a traitor to work for Japan.

However, in November 1945, Wang was arrested by the Soviet authority in Xinjing. He was accused of committing espionage during his stay in Chita from 1932 to 1936. Although he did not admit the accusation, the Soviet Union decided to send him to the labor camp in Chita. On the day of departure, Wang found that many fellows were former Manchukuo government officials. He later spent 12 years in the Soviet Union and was released in 1956.

After returning to China, he used most of his time to tutor students studying foreign languages for free.

== Personal relationships ==
Chiune Sugihara interviewed Wang when Wang applied for the diplomatic position of the Manchukuo government. Chiune Sugihara was a Japanese diplomat in Lithuania who also saved thousands of Jewish people during the WWII by issuing Japanese visas.

== Appearance in literature ==
- From Heidelberg to Shanghai by Jay-Chung Chen. ISBN 978-1543747201.

== See also ==
- Chiune Sugihara
- Fugu Plan
- Ho Feng-Shan
- History of the Jews in China
