= Italian declaration of war on the Soviet Union =

1941 event of World War II

Fascist Italy declared war on the Soviet Union on 22 June 1941 during the Axis invasion of the latter (Operation Barbarossa), breaching the earlier Italo-Soviet Pact on Neutrality and Non-Aggression. On that day Adolf Hitler accepted Benito Mussolini's offer for an Italian Army Corps to be sent to the Soviet Union. The declaration of war was presented at 11:00 a.m. local time to the Soviet ambassador Nikolay Gorelkin by the Italian foreign minister Galeazzo Ciano in the Chigi Palace, Rome. At noon, an official communiqué was issued stating that "the Italian government has informed the Soviet ambassador that Italy considers itself to be in a state of war with the USSR as of 5:30 a.m. on 22 June".

Italy became Nazi Germany's first ally to declare war on the Soviet Union during World War II, followed by the Kingdom of Romania, Slovak Republic, Finland and Kingdom of Hungary.

== Broadcast in Italy ==
News about the state of war with the Soviet Union in Gazzetta Ufficiale del Regno d'Italia, 23 June 1941

In Italy, the first public announcement about the war was broadcast on the radio at 1:00 a.m. Because 22 June fell on a Sunday when local newspapers were not circulated, it was impossible to report the news on that day in them as well. A series of special broadcasts presented the relevant statements by Adolf Hitler and German Foreign Minister Joachim von Ribbentrop to the Italian public. An announcer then read out several dispatches from the Stefani Agency in Bucharest that purportedly described the start of the Axis invasion. However, due to the unusually hot and stifling weather in Rome, there was hardly anyone outdoors, as much of the population had gone to the seaside. Consequently, the news of the declaration of war on the Soviet Union came as a surprise to the Italians.

== Aftermath ==
Despite declaration of war, Italy deployed its troops in the Soviet Union only a month later, when Italian Expeditionary Corps in Russia was rolled out. This formation was then followed by Italian Army in Russia.

In July 1943, the Italian fascist regime collapsed and the Armistice of Cassibile was signed, followed by the Armistice of Malta. At the Moscow Conference of 1943 the Declaration on Italy was approved, outlining guidelines for relations with post-war Italy. On 25 October 1944, the Soviet Union restored diplomatic relations with Italy. On 10 February 1947, a peace treaty with Italy was signed by the Soviet Union and other Allied powers, formally ending the state of war between them.

== See also ==
- Italo-German protocol of 23 October 1936
- Military history of Italy during World War II
- Pact of Steel
