= Italo-Soviet Pact =

Bilateral treaty between the Soviet Union and the Kingdom of Italy

Pact of Friendship, Neutrality, and Nonaggression between Italy and the Soviet Union
- Type: Non-aggression pact
- Signed: September 2, 1933
- Expiration: June 22, 1941
- Signatories: (Soviet Union) Maxim Litvinov (Kingdom of Italy) Benito Mussolini
- Parties: Soviet Union; Italy
- Languages: Italian and Russian

The Pact of Friendship, Neutrality, and Non-Aggression between Italy and the Soviet Union, also known as the Italo-Soviet Pact, was a non-aggression pact between the Soviet Union and Italy. Signed on 2 September 1933, the agreement was in place until 22 June 1941, when Italy declared war on the Soviet Union at the beginning of Operation Barbarossa. The pact built on earlier economic relations (traditionally strong between the countries), seeking to ensure security in the Balkans, and for a time, mutual suspicion of German intentions.

== History ==
The Soviets and Italians had maintained contacts since 26 December 1921 through the signing of a trade agreement and full diplomatic relations since 7 February 1924, making Fascist Italy one of the first Western nations to recognize the Soviet Union. A broader rapprochement occurred between the two countries in 1929 and 1930. Some members of the Italian Communist Party, such as Luigi Tolentino from Palermo, lived in exile in the Soviet Union, which caused some political friction and accusations of the Soviets harbouring "subversives." On 6 May 1933, the two powers moved closer together by signing an economic pact supporting industrialisation goals; Italy required access to Soviet oil and coal, while the Soviets were interested in Italian innovations in the aviation, automobile and naval industries. The ideological conflict between Italian Fascism and Soviet Bolshevism was largely considered as an internal matter, and relations were built up nevertheless.

Reports in TASS were keen to stress the military aspect of this. In September 1933, a Soviet military mission visited Rome and Vladimir Potemkin, who served as the Soviet Ambassador to Italy from 1932 until 1934, expressed "gratitude for the exceptional attention devoted to the Soviet mission by the Italian command and government," while a general from the Italian military stated, "the Italian Army has feelings which go deeper than the usual professional ones toward the Red Army. These feelings have been strengthened as a result of the Italo-Soviet Pact."

Potemkin sent an invite to the Undersecretary of State, Fulvio Suvich, for an Italian mission to visit the Soviet Union in return. Representatives of the Italian Army and the Italian Navy, including a brigadier general, toured the Soviet Union for two weeks, though the Italian Air Force did not, as Italo Balbo blocked the plan. There were further friendly exchanges in 1933 as an Italian submarine visited Batum on the Black Sea and three Soviet vessels visited Naples. This was in preparation for the visit of Soviet Foreign Minister Maxim Litvinov. There were plans that Soviet captains from the Red Fleet would meet Benito Mussolini, but in the end this did not happen.

These developments also coincided with Adolf Hitler's rise to power in Germany, as there was an element of uncertainty not only between the Soviets and Germans at the time, but also Italy and Germany (not least over the issue of the potential German annexation of Austria and furthermore Italian-controlled territories in South Tyrol). A third element to this relationship was the Turkish Republic. While the Soviet ships were in Naples, the Turkish Ambassador to Italy made a visit to the Soviet admiral on board. A potential Soviet-Italian-Turkish stability alliance troubled the Nazi government. Bernardo Attolico, who had been the Italian ambassador in Moscow since 1930 and helped pave the way for the 1932 agreement, called the military contacts a "tradition" and mutually beneficial, in that it helped to build Italian military and technological prestige. In the aftermath of these exchanges, Mussolini mobilised Italian troops in the summer of 1934 and had them placed on the Brenner Pass, aiming to ensure Austrian independence against the July Putsch. Mussolini hoped the pact would signal to Germany and Hitler that Italy would not support Germany against the Soviet Union and would bring back “reason” in Berlin, and reduce Germany’s antagonism towards the Soviets after Hitler’s rise to power.

The pact was violated three times during the period it was in effect. First, Italy staunchly supported Francisco Franco during the Spanish Civil War in his fight against the Second Spanish Republic, which was supported by the Soviet Union in a proxy war. Second, Italy promptly responded to requests by the Republic of Finland for military assistance and equipment for use against the Soviet government during the Winter War. The Royal Italian Air Force (Regia Aeronautica Italiana) sent thirty-five Fiat G.50 fighters, while the Royal Italian Army (Regio Esercito Italiano) supplied 94,500 new M1938 7.35 mm rifles for use by Finnish infantry. However Germany, having just signed the Molotov–Ribbentrop Pact with the Soviet Union, intercepted most of Italy's aid and only released it once peace had been made. A handful of Italian volunteers also fought in the Winter War on the side of Finland. The third violation was Italy joining the Anti-Comintern Pact in 1937, an anti-Communist pact concluded between Nazi Germany and the Empire of Japan the year prior.

The Soviet Union called for League of Nations sanctions on Italy "as a matter of principle" over its aggression in Ethiopia, and complied with the sanctions on specific commodities after they went into effect. Despite this, overall Soviet-Italian trade remained close to pre-sanctions levels. The sanctions only affected three products which the USSR exported to Italy (iron ore, manganese, and chromium), and Soviet exports of other goods increased during the sanctions period, so that total Soviet exports to Italy only dropped to 83.5% of their pre-sanctions levels, which was a slight reduction compared to other countries such as Britain which dropped its exports to 8.6%. Soviet oil sales to Italy increased slightly after the war began, but the total oil trade volume was small compared to levels one year earlier, when Italy had mostly switched to Romania as its preferred oil supplier. During this time the Soviet Union also supplied 91% of Italy's import of oats, which were used to feed the horses of the Italian military. Soviet imports from Italy were small before the sanctions period and only decreased slightly.

Italian and Soviet interests coincided once again in China. In October 1933, Potemkin warned Suvich that Germany would seek an agreement with Japan, another country perceived as a threat to both Soviet and Italian interests. Despite his distrust of the British presence in East Asia, Potemkin insisted on the need to create a coalition between the USSR, Italy, the British Empire, France and the United States to defend China from the Japanese aggressor.

On January 13, 1934, Mussolini gave a widely published press interview in Rome. This interview was based mainly on Litvinov's speech of 29 December 1933 in which he warned about Japanese expansionism in East Asia. Mussolini quoted Litvinov's warning in which he described Japan as "the darkest cloud on the international political horizon." Mussolini added that the international community did not have enough determination to stop Japan and the militaristic mentality of its ruling elite and praised Stalin's USSR for its firmness against the Japanese.

Soviet-Italian relations were badly hurt by the Spanish Civil War from 1936–39, and almost all trade between the two countries stopped for several years. Relations improved slightly after 1939.

Italy finally tore up the pact on 22 June 1941, when it joined the other European Axis powers to launch a surprise invasion of the Soviet Union.

== See also ==
- Italy–Russia relations
- Rome Protocols
- Franco-Italian Agreement of 1935
- Hoare–Laval Pact
- Vatican–Soviet relations
- Molotov–Ribbentrop Pact
- Four-Power Pact
- Pact of Steel

== Sources ==
- Burgwyn, H. James (1997). Italian Foreign Policy in the Interwar Period, 1918-1940. Greenwood Press. ISBN 0275948773.
- Calvitt Clarke, Joseph (1991). Russia and Italy Against Hitler: The Bolshevik-Fascist Rapprochment of the 1930s. Greenwood Press. ISBN 0313274681.
- Gorodetsky, Gabriel (2014). Soviet Foreign Policy, 1917-1991: A Retrospective. Routledge. ISBN 978-1135201746.
- Stocker, Donald J. (2003). Girding for Battle: The Arms Trade in a Global Perspective, 1815-1940. Greenwood Press. ISBN 0275973395.
- Strang, G. Bruce (2016). Collision of Empires: Italy's Invasion of Ethiopia and Its International Impact. Routledge. ISBN 978-1317164173.
