= Pact of Steel =

Military alliance between Germany and Italy before World War II

Pact of Friendship and Alliance between Germany and Italy
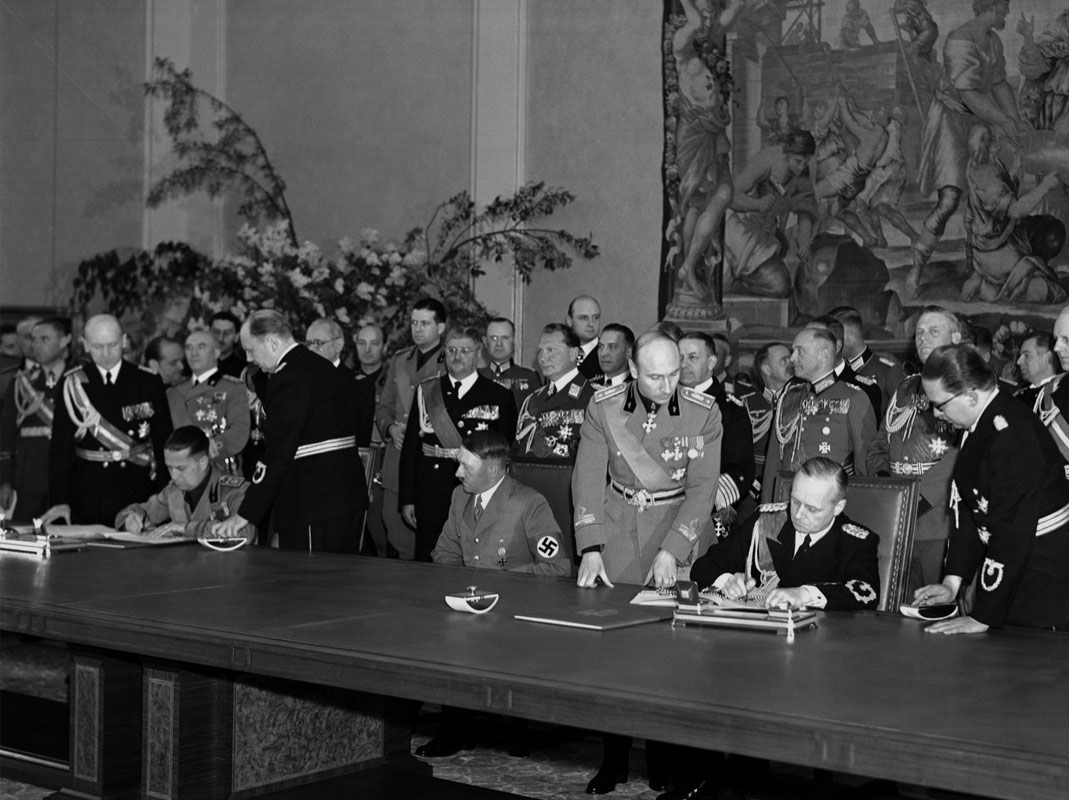
- Galeazzo Ciano, Adolf Hitler and Joachim von Ribbentrop at the signing of the Pact of Steel in the Reichskanzlei in Berlin
- Type: Military - Political
- Signed: 22 May 1939
- Location: Berlin, Germany
- Expiration: 1949 (effectively in 1943)
- Signatories: Joachim von Ribbentrop; Galeazzo Ciano
- Parties: Germany; Italy
- Languages: German, Italian

The Pact of Steel (German: Stahlpakt, Italian: Patto d'Acciaio), formally known as the Pact of Friendship and Alliance between Germany and Italy (German: Freundschafts- und Bündnispakt zwischen Deutschland und Italien, Italian: Patto di amicizia e di alleanza fra l'Italia e la Germania), was a military and political alliance between Germany and Italy, signed in 1939.

The pact was initially drafted as a tripartite military alliance between Japan, Italy and Germany. While Japan wanted the focus of the pact to be aimed at the Soviet Union, Italy and Germany wanted the focus of it to be aimed at the British Empire and France. Due to that disagreement, the pact was signed without Japan and, as a result, it became an agreement which only existed between Italy and Germany, signed on 22 May 1939 by foreign ministers Joachim von Ribbentrop of Germany and Galeazzo Ciano of Italy.

Together with the Anti-Comintern Pact and the Tripartite Pact, the Pact of Steel was one of the three agreements forming the main basis of the Axis alliance. The pact consisted of two parts. The first section was an open declaration of continuing trust and co-operation between Germany and Italy. The second section, the "Secret Supplementary Protocol", encouraged a union of policies concerning the military and the economy.

== Background ==
Germany and Italy fought against each other in World War I. Popularity and support for radical political parties (such as the Nazis of Adolf Hitler and the Fascists of Benito Mussolini) exploded after the Great Depression had severely hampered the economies of both countries.

In 1922, Mussolini secured his position as Prime Minister of the Kingdom of Italy. His first actions made him immensely popular - massive programs of public works providing employment and transforming Italy's infrastructure. In the Mediterranean, Mussolini built a powerful navy, larger than the combined might of the British and French Mediterranean fleets.

The Four-Power Pact was a consultative agreement formally signed on 15 July in Rome; between Italy, United Kingdom, Germany, and France intended to coordinate on European security and Mussolini's proposal to make the major four powers more important than the small countries in the League of Nations. The pact was not ratified by the French Parliament and was not completely devoid of merit, as it aimed to settle differences and create a common anti-Soviet front. However, it faced speculation in France and Germany, and it ultimately supported by all the four great powers, as well as other states.

When he was appointed Chancellor in 1933, Hitler initiated a huge wave of public works and secret rearmament. Italy initially signed the Italo-Soviet Pact aimed against Germany when Hitler came to power. Fascism and Nazism shared similar principles and Hitler and Mussolini met on several state and private occasions in the 1930s. Initially, Italy was opposed to Germany over its planned territorial expansion into Austria and had signed the Rome Protocols of 1934 and joined the Stresa Front. But Italy's ostracization by foreign powers over the Abyssinia Crisis left it with no major allies and meant that an alliance with Germany was seen as desirable. On 23 October 1936, Italy and Germany signed a secret protocol aligning their foreign policy for the first time on such issues as the Spanish Civil War, the League of Nations and the Abyssinia Crisis.

== Japan ==
In 1931, Japanese forces invaded the region of Manchuria because of its rich grain fields and reserves of raw minerals. This, however, provoked a diplomatic clash with the Soviet Union, which bordered Manchuria. To combat this Soviet threat, the Japanese signed a pact with Germany in 1936. The aim of the pact was to guard against any attack from Soviet Russia were it to move on China.

Japan elected to focus on anti-Soviet alliances instead of anti-Western alliances like Italy and Germany. Germany, however, feared that an anti-USSR alliance would create the possibility of a two-front war before they could conquer Western Europe. So when Italy invited Japan to sign the Pact of Steel, it demurred.

== Clauses ==
Officially, the Pact of Steel obliged Germany and Italy to aid the other country militarily, economically or otherwise in the event of war, and to collaborate in wartime production. The Pact aimed to ensure that neither country was able to make peace without the agreement of the other. The agreement was based on the assumption that a war would not occur within three years. When Germany invaded Poland on 1 September 1939 and war broke out on 3 September, Italy was not yet prepared for conflict and had difficulty meeting its obligations. Consequently, Italy did not enter World War II until June 1940, with a delayed invasion of Southern France.

Article I
The Contracting Parties will remain in permanent contact with each other in order to come to an understanding of all common interests or the European situation as a whole.

Article II
In the event that the common interests of the Contracting Parties be jeopardized through international happenings of any kind, they will immediately enter into consultation regarding the necessary measures to preserve these interests. Should the security or other vital interests of one of the Contracting Parties be threatened from outside, the other Contracting Party will afford the threatened Party its full political and diplomatic support in order to remove this threat.

Article III
If it should happen, against the wishes and hopes of the Contracting Parties, that one of them becomes involved in military complications with another power or other Powers, other Contracting Party will immediately step to its side as an ally and will support it with all its military might on land, at sea and in the air.

Article IV
In order to ensure, in any given case, the rapid implementation of the alliance obligations of Article III, the Governments of the two Contracting Parties will further intensify their cooperation in the military sphere and the sphere of war economy. Similarly the two Governments will keep each other regularly informed of other measures necessary for the practical implementation of this Pact. The two Governments will create standing commissions, under the direction of the Foreign Ministers, for the purposes indicated in Article I and II.

Article V
The Contracting Parties already at this point bind themselves, in the event of a jointly waged war, to conclude any armistice or peace only in full agreement with each other.

Article VI
The two Contracting Parties are aware of the importance of their joint relations to the Powers which are friendly to them. They are determined to maintain these relations in future and to promote the adequate development of the common interests which bind them to these Powers.

Article VII
This Pact comes into force immediately upon its signing. The two Contracting Parties are agreed upon fixing the first period of its validity at 10 years. In good time before the elapse of this period they will come to an agreement regarding the extension of the validity of the Pact.

=== Secret supplementary protocols ===
The secret supplementary protocols of the Pact of Steel, which were split into two sections, were not made public at the time of the signing of the Pact.

The first section urged the countries to quicken their joint military and economic cooperation whilst the second section committed the two countries to cooperate in "matters of press, the news service and the propaganda" to promote the power and image of the Rome-Berlin Axis. To aid in this, each country was to assign "one or several specialists" of their country in the capital city of the other for close liaisons with the Foreign Minister of that country.

== Name change ==
After being told the original name, "Pact of Blood", would likely be poorly received in Italy, Mussolini proposed the name "Pact of Steel", which was ultimately chosen.

== Dissolution ==
According to Article VII, the pact was to last 10 years, but this did not happen. In November 1942, the Axis forces in North Africa, were decisively defeated by the British and British Commonwealth forces at the Second Battle of El Alamein. In July 1943 the Western Allies opened up a new front by invading Sicily. In the aftermath of this, Mussolini was overthrown by 19 members of the Gran Consiglio who voted in favour of the Ordine Grandi. The new Italian government, under Field Marshal Pietro Badoglio, signed an armistice with the Allies in September and became a non-belligerent, thus effectively ending Italy's involvement in the pact.

Although a puppet government under Mussolini, the Italian Social Republic, was established in Northern Italy by Nazi Germany, Italy continued as a member of the pact in name only.

== See also ==
- Anti-Comintern Pact
- Causes of World War II
- Military history of Italy during World War II
- Tripartite Pact
