= Italo-German protocol of 23 October 1936 =

1936 treaty between Italy and Germany

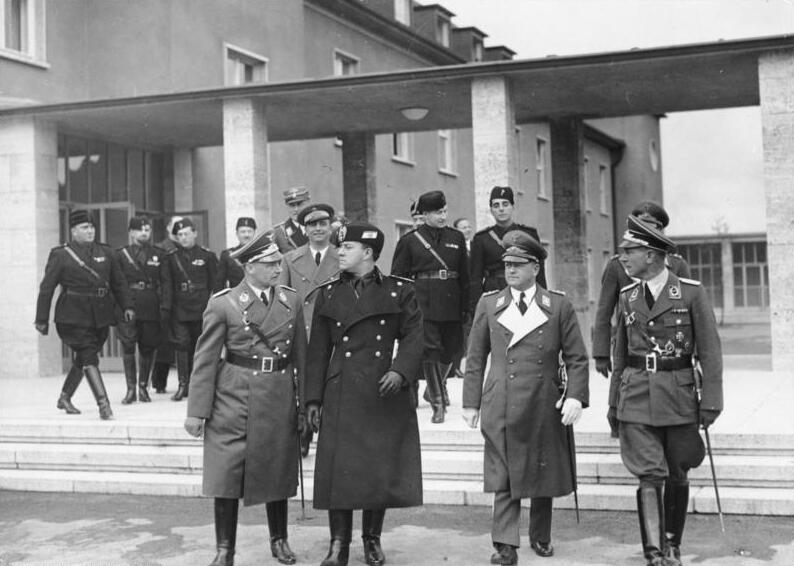
Ciano (second from left, front) visits Gatow airfield on 24 October 1936 during his trip to Berlin. He stands between Karl-Lothar Schulz (left) and Erhard Milch (right).

On 23 October 1936, a nine-point protocol was signed by Fascist Italy and Nazi Germany in Berlin. It was the first concrete expression of the Italo-German rapprochement that began earlier that year. It was signed by the foreign ministers Galeazzo Ciano and Konstantin von Neurath. On the same day in Berlin, the Anti-Comintern Pact between Germany and Japan was initialed by Ambassador-at-Large Joachim von Ribbentrop and Ambassador Kintomo Mushanokoji.

Ciano's visit to Germany was his first trip abroad as foreign minister. He met von Neurath on 21 October and the two conferred over the next two days. Following the signing of the protocol, Ciano met German Führer Adolf Hitler at his retreat in Berchtesgaden on the Austrian border. He gave Hitler stolen British cabinet correspondence in an effort to turn Hitler against the British. Hitler confirmed the Mediterranean as Italy's sphere of influence and told Ciano that Germany would be ready for war in three years.

The protocol was drawn up in German and Italian in parallel columns, each being equally authoritative. The only difference between the versions was that the Italian date included the Roman numeral XIV, indicating the year of the Fascist era. The contents of the protocol were not publicly revealed at the time. The main focus of discussions was on the Spanish Civil War, the only area in which Germany and Italy were actively cooperating. (This cooperation had only recently begun, through talks between Mario Roatta and Wilhelm Canaris on 28 August.) In the protocol, the two sides agreed to resist the renewal of the Locarno Treaties, to align their attitudes towards the League of Nations (of which only Italy was a member) and to pursue economic cooperation in the Danube basin. Germany agreed to recognize Italy's conquest of Ethiopia and Italy agreed to support the restoration of Germany's colonies, lost in the First World War. Italy also accepted the Austro-German Accord of 11 July 1936, which normalized relations between Germany and Austria.

In their public statements, both the German and Italian governments presented Ciano's diplomatic visit and the understanding reached as a challenge to Western hegemony in Europe. The Völkischer Beobachter, the newspaper of the ruling Nazi Party in Germany, stressed the breaking with traditional diplomatic practice, citing Ciano's speech to some Hitler Youth. On 1 November, in a speech in the Piazza del Duomo in Milan, Italian Prime Minister Benito Mussolini referred to the Italo-German relationship as an "Axis" for the first time: "The Berlin encounters have resulted in an agreement between both countries on specific problems which are particularly acute these days. But this agreement ... this vertical axis Berlin–Rome is not a diaphragm, but rather an axis with which all European states animated by the will to collaborate and to peace can collaborate." The protocol has been seen as "a joint declaration of war on the status quo", mainly represented by the opposition of Britain and France to German and Italian expansion.

== Text ==
The following is the English translation published by the United States Government Printing Office, with a few tweaks to formatting:

1. The two Governments, in the negotiations for a Western Pact, will, as hitherto, proceed in the closest contact with one another.
2. As long as Italy remains in the League of Nations, the Italian Government, in their policy within the League of Nations, will have full regard to the common interests of both countries, and for this purpose will keep in touch with the German Government. ticular also the Italian Government will in each case enter into consultation with the German Government over the question of taking part in various activities of the League of Nations (conferences, commissions etc.)
  Should Italy decide to withdraw from the League of Nations, this would represent a new factor, which would be calculated to release the German Government from the offer made in this connexion in their proposals of March 7 and 31 last. In such a case, too, Germany and Italy would coordinate as far as possible their future attitude towards the League of Nations.
3. The two Governments recognize that Communism is the greatest danger threatening the peace and the security of Europe. They confirm their intention to combat Communist propaganda with all their strength and to direct their own actions in this sense.
4. As the Nationalists are in occupation of the greater part of Spain and as Germany and Italy have considerable economic interests there, the two Governments will recognize the Spanish National Government de facto as soon as possible. They will keep in touch with one another for the purpose of announcing de jure recognition subsequently. When they announce this, the two Governments will confirm the principle of non-intervention and respect for the integrity and territorial unity of Spain, her protectorates and her colonies.
  The two Governments will jointly examine the question of when, after the de facto recognition, the time has come to declare the agreed arms embargo to be invalidated.
5. The Italian Government express their satisfaction over the policy of the normalization of German-Austrian relations inaugurated by the Agreement of July 11 last between Germany and Austria. The German Government and the Italian Government are at one in their desire that this policy may continue to prove fruitful in the future.
6. Prior to any international conference on economic and financial questions, the German and Italian Governments will come to an understanding beforehand on their attitude and will, as far as is possible, follow a joint line at these conferences.
7. The Italian Government will give diplomatic support to Germany's efforts to obtain colonies with a view to securing a source of raw materials of her [Germany's] own.
  The German and Italian Governments will, apart from the question of colonies, strive in common endeavour to facilitate the supply of raw materials for both countries.
8. The German and Italian Governments will keep each other currently informed of the basic principles governing their commercial policies in the Danubian region.
  Whilst the two Governments recognize the value of such cooperation, they reserve the right to have its nature and extent studied and fixed by their respective technical bodies.
  The two Governments confirm their opposition, in future too, towards all endeavours to set up in the Danubian region, without the simultaneous participation of Germany and Italy, new economic organizations such as, for example, economic integration [Zusammenschluss] of the Little Entente, or an economic integration in the sense of the Tardieu Plan.
9. On the occasion of the German recognition of the incorporation of Abyssinia [Ethiopia], the Italian Government declare that they agree to the German-Italian Commercial Treaty of 31 October 1925 and the German Italian Clearing Agreement of 26 September 1934 together with the supplementary agreements subsequently concluded, being extended to the Italian colonies and possessions, including Abyssinia. In addition, there will be concluded in respect of the colonies and possessions, including Abyssinia, appropriate agreements, such as are contained, in respect of commercial relations with the Kingdom of Italy, in the German Italian Agreement of 16 April 1935 on the exchange of goods together with the supplementary agreements thereto.
  The Italian Government will as far as possible promote the endeavours of German trade and industry to take part in the economic exploitation of Abyssinia.
  The Italian Government declare that they are prepared to enter at once into conversations on the treatment of concessions legally acquired before 3 October 1935 by German Reich nationals in Abyssinia, and to conduct these conversations in a most benevolent and friendly spirit.
  With regard to any concessions granted subsequently, the Italian Government reserve their views on each individual case.

The treaties and agreements necessary for the implementation of the points enumerated above shall be concluded as soon as possible. The negotiations thereon shall be entrusted to the German and Italian Government Committees for the settlement of German Italian economic relations; these Committees shall hold their next joint session as soon as possible.
