= Rome Protocols =

1934 agreements between Austria, Hungary, and Italy

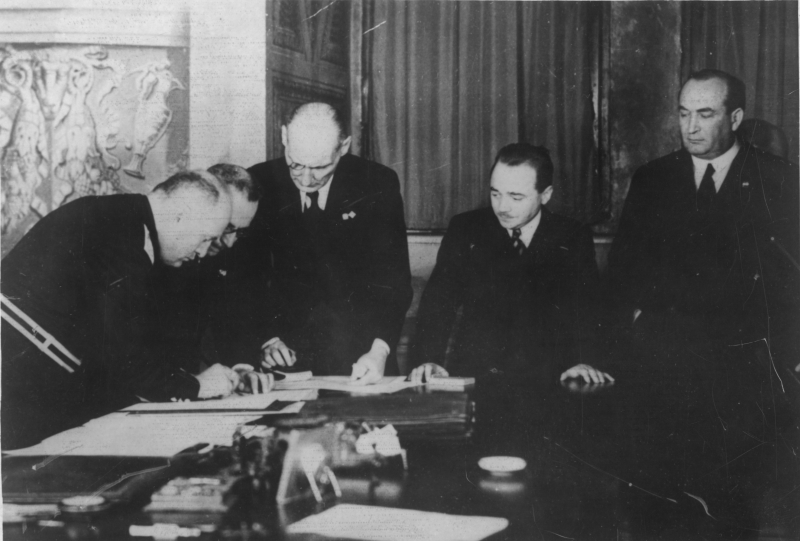
First from the left: Benito Mussolini, first from the right: Gyula Gömbös, second from the right Engelbert Dolfuss

The Rome Protocols (German: Römer Protokolle, Hungarian: Római jegyzőkönyvek) were a series of three international agreements concluded in Rome on 17 March 1934 between the governments of Austria, Hungary, and Italy. The protocols were signed for the purpose of opposing Germany's planned territorial expansion into Austria and to provide security for the signatories. They were signed by Italian Prime Minister Benito Mussolini, Austrian Chancellor Engelbert Dollfuss, and Hungarian Prime Minister Gyula Gömbös. All of the protocols went into effect on 12 July 1934 and were registered in League of Nations Treaty Series on 12 December 1934.

== Background ==
The Rome Protocols, even though they dealt only with economic development, were part of the process of co-operation between the three signatory governments against the revisionist policies of Adolf Hitler, who had just come to power in Germany, as well as against the territorial integrity of Yugoslavia, which they wished to dismember among themselves. The protocols' co-operation was short-lived since in 1938, Mussolini allowed Hitler to invade Austria, and the Hungarian government, led by Miklós Horthy, also supported the Third Reich that year.

== Terms ==
Protocol No 1 was very brief and contained no clauses but only a brief statement in which the signatories undertook "To confer together on all problems which particularly concern them, and on problems of a general character, with a view to pursuing, in the spirit of the existing treaties of friendship between Italy and Austria, Italy and Hungary and Austria and Hungary, which are based on a recognition of the existence of numerous common interests, a concordant policy directed towards the promotion of effective co-operation between the States of Europe and particularly between Italy, Austria and Hungary". In the following paragraph, the three governments undertook "to hold joint consultations whenever at least one of them deems it desirable".

Protocol No 2 dealt with economic relations between the three governments. In Article 1 the three governments undertook not to place any obstacles to trade between them and to conclude commercial treaties to that effect. In Article 2, the parties undertook to assist the Hungarian government because of the fall in the price of wheat. In Article 3, the parties undertook to facilitate the rapid transit of goods through the ports of the Adriatic Sea. In Article 4, the parties undertook to establish a commission of experts to make further recommendations in the economic field.

Protocol No 3 was concluded between only the governments of Italy and Austria. In Article 1, both governments undertook to negotiate a new trade treaty between them as soon as possible. In Article 2, they undertook to grant each other trade privileges in the new trade treaty to be negotiated.
