= Winter War =

1939–1940 war between the Soviet Union and Finland

- Part of the European theatre of World War II
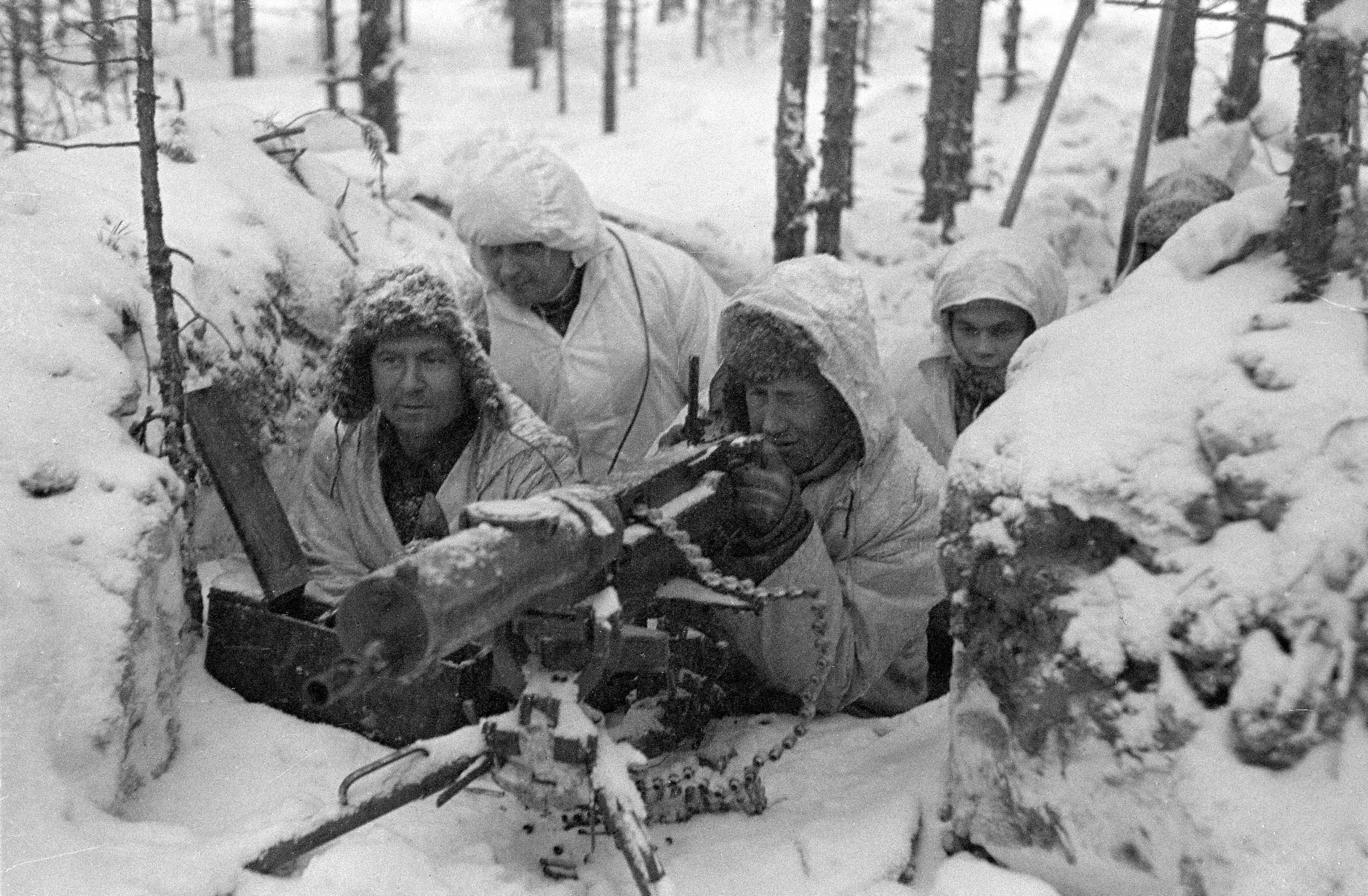
- A Finnish Maxim M/09-21 machine gun crew during the Winter War
Date	30 November 1939 – 13 March 1940 (3 months, 1 week and 6 days)
Location	Eastern Finland
Result	Moscow Peace Treaty
Territorial changes	Cession of the Gulf of Finland islands, Karelian Isthmus, Ladoga Karelia, Salla, Rybachy Peninsula and lease of Hanko to the Soviet Union

Belligerents
Finland: Foreign volunteers	Soviet Union: Finnish Democratic Republic

Commanders and leaders
(Finland) Kyösti Kallio; (Finland) C.G.E. Mannerheim; (Finland) Hugo Österman; (Finland) Harald Öhquist; (Finland) Erik Heinrichs; (Finland) Woldemar Hägglund; (Finland) Wiljo Tuompo	(Soviet Union) Joseph Stalin; (Soviet Union) Kliment Voroshilov; (Soviet Union) Semyon Timoshenko; (Soviet Union) Kirill Meretskov; (Soviet Union) Vladimir Grendal; (Soviet Union) Grigori Shtern; (Soviet Union) Mikhail Dukhanov; (Soviet Union) Valerian Frolov

Strength
300,000–340,000 soldiers (Note: At the beginning of the war, the Finns had 300,000 soldiers. The Finnish Army had 250,028 rifles and a total of 281,594 firearms. The White Guards brought their own firearms (over 114,000 rifles and a total 116,800 firearms) to the war. The Finnish Army reached its maximum strength at the beginning of March 1940 with 346,000 soldiers in uniform.); 32 tanks (Note: From 1919 onwards, the Finns possessed 32 French Renault FT tanks and a few lighter tanks. These were unsuitable for the war and they were subsequently used as fixed pillboxes. The Finns bought 32 British Vickers 6-Ton tanks during 1936–39, but without weapons. Weapons were intended to be manufactured and installed in Finland. Only 10 tanks were fit for combat at the beginning of the conflict.); 114 aircraft (Note: On 1 December 1939 the Finns had 114 combat aeroplanes fit for duty and seven aeroplanes for communication and observation purposes. Almost 100 aeroplanes were used for flight training purposes, unsuitable for combat or under repair. In total, the Finns had 173 aircraft and 43 reserve aircraft.)	425,000–760,000 soldiers (Note: 550,757 soldiers on 1 January 1940 and 760,578 soldiers by the beginning of March. In the Leningrad Military District, 1,000,000 soldiers and 20 divisions one month before the war and 58 divisions two weeks before its end.); 2,514–6,541 tanks (Note: At the beginning of the war, the Soviets had 2,514 tanks and 718 armoured cars. The main battlefield was the Karelian Isthmus where the Soviets deployed 1,450 tanks. At the end of the war the Soviets had 6,541 tanks and 1,691 armoured cars. The most common tank type was T-26, but also BT type was very common.); 3,880 aircraft

Casualties and losses
25,904 dead or missing 43,557 wounded 800–1,100 captured 20–30 tanks 62 aircraft 1 armed icebreaker damaged Finnish Ladoga Naval Detachment ceded to the Soviet Union; 70,000 total casualties	126,875–167,976 dead or missing 188,671–207,538 wounded or sick (including at least 61,506 sick or frostbitten); 5,572 captured 1,200–3,543 tanks 261–515 aircraft 321,000–381,000 total casualties

The Winter War (Note: This name is translated as follows: Finnish: talvisota, Swedish: Vinterkriget, Russian: Зи́мняя война́, romanized: Zimnyaya voyna. The names Soviet–Finnish War 1939–1940 (Russian: Сове́тско-финская война́ 1939–1940) and Soviet–Finland War 1939–1940 (Russian: Сове́тско-финляндская война́ 1939–1940) are often used in Russian historiography; Russo-Finnish War 1939–1940 or Finno-Russian War 1939–1940 are used by the U.S. Library of Congress's catalogue (see authority control).) was a war between the Soviet Union and Finland. It began with a Soviet invasion of Finland on 30 November 1939, three months after the outbreak of World War II, and ended three and a half months later with the Moscow Peace Treaty on 13 March 1940. Despite superior military strength, especially in tanks and aircraft, the Soviet Union suffered severe losses and initially made little headway. The League of Nations deemed the attack illegal and expelled the Soviet Union from its organization.

The Soviets made several demands, including that Finland cede substantial border territories in exchange for land elsewhere, claiming security reasons — primarily the protection of Leningrad, 32 km (20 mi) from the Finnish border. When Finland refused, the Soviets invaded. Most sources conclude that the Soviet Union had intended to conquer all of Finland, and cite the establishment of the puppet Finnish Communist government and the Molotov–Ribbentrop Pact's secret protocols as evidence of this, (Note: See the relevant section and the following sources:) while other sources argue against the idea of a full Soviet conquest. (Note: See the relevant section and the following sources:) Finland repelled Soviet attacks for more than two months and inflicted substantial losses on the invaders in temperatures as low as −43 °C (−45 °F). The battles focused mainly on Taipale along the Karelian Isthmus, on Kollaa in Ladoga Karelia and on Raate Road in Kainuu, but there were also battles in Lapland and North Karelia.

Following the initial setbacks, the Soviets reduced their strategic objectives and put an end to the puppet Finnish communist government in late January 1940, and informed the legitimate Finnish government that they were willing to negotiate peace. After the Soviet military reorganized and adopted different tactics, they renewed their offensive in February 1940 and overcame the Finnish defences on the Karelian Isthmus. This left the Finnish Army in the main theatre of war near the breaking point, with a retreat seeming inevitable. Consequently, Finnish commander-in-chief Carl Gustaf Emil Mannerheim urged a peace deal with the Soviets, while the Finns still retained bargaining power.

Hostilities ceased in March 1940 with the signing of the Moscow Peace Treaty in which Finland ceded 9% of its territory to the Soviet Union. Soviet losses were heavy, and the country's international reputation suffered. Their gains exceeded their pre-war demands, and the Soviets received substantial territories along Lake Ladoga and further north. Finland retained its sovereignty and enhanced its international reputation. The poor performance of the Red Army encouraged German Chancellor Adolf Hitler to believe that an attack on the Soviet Union would be successful and confirmed negative Western opinions of the Soviet military. After 15 months of Interim Peace, in June 1941, Germany commenced Operation Barbarossa, and the Continuation War between Finland and the Soviets began.

== Background ==
=== Finnish-Soviet relations and politics ===
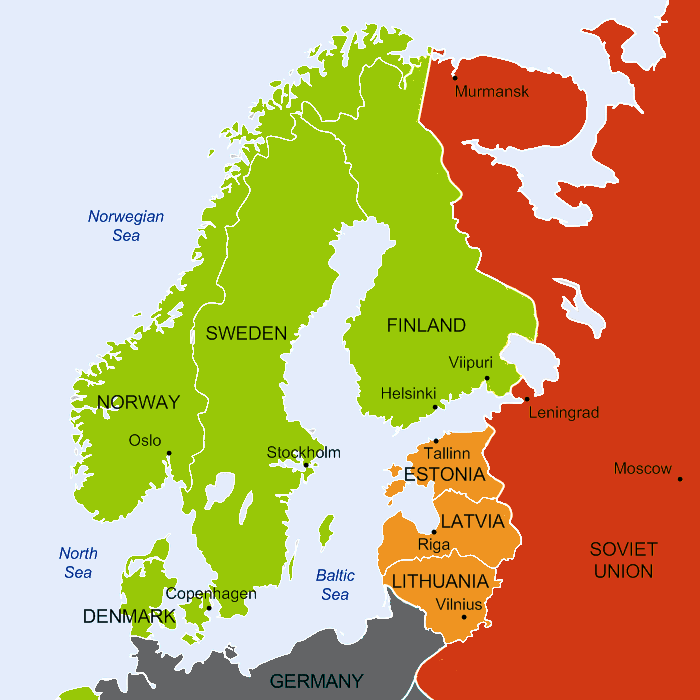
Geopolitical status in Northern Europe in November 1939 Neutral countries Germany and annexed countries Soviet Union and annexed countries Neutral countries with military bases established by Soviet Union in October 1939

Until the early 19th century, Finland was the eastern part of the Kingdom of Sweden. From 21 February 1808 to 17 September 1809, the Russian Empire waged the Finnish War against the Kingdom of Sweden, ostensibly to protect the Russian capital, Saint Petersburg. Eventually Russia conquered and annexed Finland, and converted it into an autonomous buffer state. The resulting Grand Duchy of Finland enjoyed wide autonomy within Russia until the end of the 19th century, when Russia began attempts to assimilate Finland as part of a general policy to strengthen the central government and unify the Empire by Russification. Those attempts were aborted because of Russia's internal strife, but they ruined Russia's relationship with Finland. In addition, support increased in Finland for self-determination movements.

World War I led to the collapse of the Russian Empire during the Russian Revolution of 1917 and the Russian Civil War. On 15 November 1917, the Bolshevik Russian government declared that national minorities possessed the right of self-determination, including the right to secede and form a separate state, which gave Finland a window of opportunity. On 6 December 1917, the Senate of Finland declared the nation's independence. Soviet Russia, later the Soviet Union, recognised the new Finnish government just three weeks after the declaration. Finland achieved full sovereignty in May 1918 after a four-month civil war in which the conservative Whites defeated the socialist Reds with the help of the Imperial German Army, pro-German Jägers, and some Swedish troops, in addition to the expulsion of Bolshevik troops.

Finland joined the League of Nations in 1920 and sought security guarantees, but Finland's primary goal was co-operation with the Scandinavian countries (mainly Sweden), and focused on the exchange of information and on defence planning (the joint defence of Åland, for example), rather than on military exercises or on the stockpiling and deployment of materiel. Nevertheless, Sweden carefully avoided committing itself to Finnish foreign policy. Finland's military policy included clandestine defence co-operation with Estonia.

The period after the Finnish Civil War to the early 1930s was a politically unstable time in Finland because of the continued rivalry between the conservatives and the socialists. The Communist Party of Finland was declared illegal in 1931, and the nationalist Lapua Movement organised anticommunist violence, which culminated in a failed coup attempt in 1932. The successor of the Lapua Movement, the Patriotic People's Movement, had a minor presence in national politics and never had more than 14 seats of the 200 in the Finnish Parliament. By the late 1930s, the export-oriented Finnish economy was growing and the nation's extreme political movements had diminished.

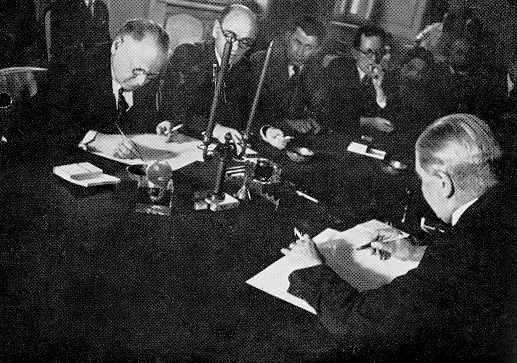
The Soviet–Finnish Non-Aggression Pact was signed by Aarno Yrjö-Koskinen and Maxim Litvinov in Moscow 1932.

After Soviet involvement in the Finnish Civil War in 1918, no formal peace treaty was signed. In 1918 and 1919, Finnish volunteers conducted two unsuccessful military incursions across the Soviet border, the Viena and Aunus expeditions, to annex areas in Karelia that according to the Greater Finland ideology would combine all Baltic Finnic peoples into a single state. In 1920, Finnish communists based in Soviet Russia attempted to assassinate the former Finnish White Guard Commander-in-Chief, Marshal Carl Gustaf Emil Mannerheim. On 14 October 1920, Finland and Soviet Russia signed the Treaty of Tartu, confirming the old border between the autonomous Grand Duchy of Finland and Imperial Russia proper as the new Finnish–Soviet border. Finland also received Petsamo Province, with its ice-free harbour on the Arctic Ocean. Despite the signing of the treaty, relations between the two countries remained strained. The Finnish government allowed volunteers to cross the border to support the East Karelian uprising in Russia in 1921, and Finnish communists in the Soviet Union continued to prepare for revenge and staged a cross-border raid into Finland, the Pork Mutiny, in 1922. In 1932, the Soviet–Finnish Non-Aggression Pact was signed between both countries, and it was reaffirmed for ten years in 1934. Foreign trade in Finland was booming, but less than 1% of it was with the Soviet Union. In 1934, the Soviet Union also joined the League of Nations.

=== Justification ===
Soviet General Secretary Joseph Stalin regarded it a disappointment that the Soviet Union could not halt the Finnish Revolution. He thought that the pro-Finland movement in Karelia posed a direct threat to Leningrad and that the area and defences of Finland could be used to invade the Soviet Union or restrict fleet movements. Soviet propaganda then painted Finland's leadership as a "vicious and reactionary fascist clique". Field Marshal Mannerheim and Väinö Tanner, the leader of the Finnish Social Democratic Party, were targeted for particular scorn. When Stalin gained absolute power through the Great Purge of 1938, the Soviets changed their foreign policy toward Finland and began to pursue the reconquest of the provinces of Tsarist Russia that had been lost during the chaos of the October Revolution of 1917 and the Russian Civil War almost two decades earlier. Soviet leaders believed that the old empire's extended borders provided territorial security and wanted Leningrad, only 32 km (20 mi) from the Finnish border, to enjoy a similar level of security against the rising power of Nazi Germany.

=== Negotiations ===
Finland's White Guard and Uusimaa regiment on winter manoeuvres in Helsinki rural municipality in February 1938

In April 1938, NKVD agent Boris Yartsev contacted Finnish Foreign Minister Rudolf Holsti and Finnish Prime Minister Aimo Cajander, stating that the Soviets did not trust Germany and that war was considered possible between the two countries. The Red Army would not wait passively behind the border but would rather "advance to meet the enemy". Finnish representatives assured Yartsev that Finland was committed to a policy of neutrality and that the country would resist any armed incursion. Yartsev suggested that Finland cede or lease some islands in the Gulf of Finland along the seaward approaches to Leningrad, but Finland refused.

Negotiations continued throughout 1938 without results. The Finnish reception of Soviet entreaties was decidedly cool, as the violent collectivisation and purges in Stalin's Soviet Union resulted in a poor opinion of the country. Most of the Finnish communist elite in the Soviet Union had been executed during the Great Purge, further tarnishing the Soviets' image in Finland. Meanwhile, Finland was attempting to negotiate a military co-operation plan with Sweden and hoping to jointly defend Åland.

The Soviet Union and Nazi Germany signed the Molotov–Ribbentrop Pact in August 1939. It was publicly a non-aggression treaty, but it included a secret protocol in which Central and Eastern European countries were divided into spheres of influence. Finland fell into the Soviet sphere. On 1 September 1939, Germany began its invasion of Poland, and two days later, the United Kingdom and France declared war on Germany. On 17 September, the Soviet invasion of Poland began. After the fall of Poland, Germany and the Soviet Union exchanged occupied Polish lands to establish a new border in accordance with the provisions of the Molotov-Ribbentrop Pact. Estonia, Latvia and Lithuania were soon forced to accept treaties that allowed the Soviets to establish military bases on their soil. Estonia accepted the ultimatum by signing the agreement on 28 September. Latvia and Lithuania followed in October. Unlike the three Baltic countries, Finland started a gradual mobilisation under the guise of "additional refresher training". The Soviets had already started intensive mobilisation near the Finnish border in 1938–39. Assault troops thought to be necessary for the invasion did not begin deployment until October 1939. Operational plans made in September called for the invasion to start in November.

On 5 October 1939, the Soviets invited a Finnish delegation to Moscow for negotiations. Juho Kusti Paasikivi, the Finnish envoy to Sweden, was sent to Moscow to represent the Finnish government. Furthermore, the negotiations were attended by Stalin in person, signalling the seriousness of the effort. Paasikivi would later recount his surprise over the friendly atmosphere in which the delegation was received, and mentioned the pleasant manners of Stalin towards them.

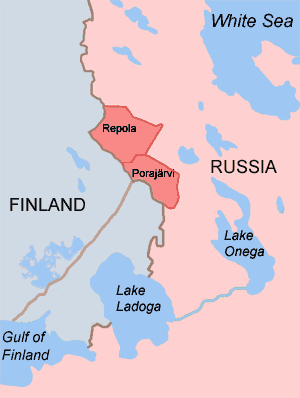
Reboly (Repola) and Porosozero (Porajärvi). The border between Finland and Soviet Union before and after 1940 is also visible.

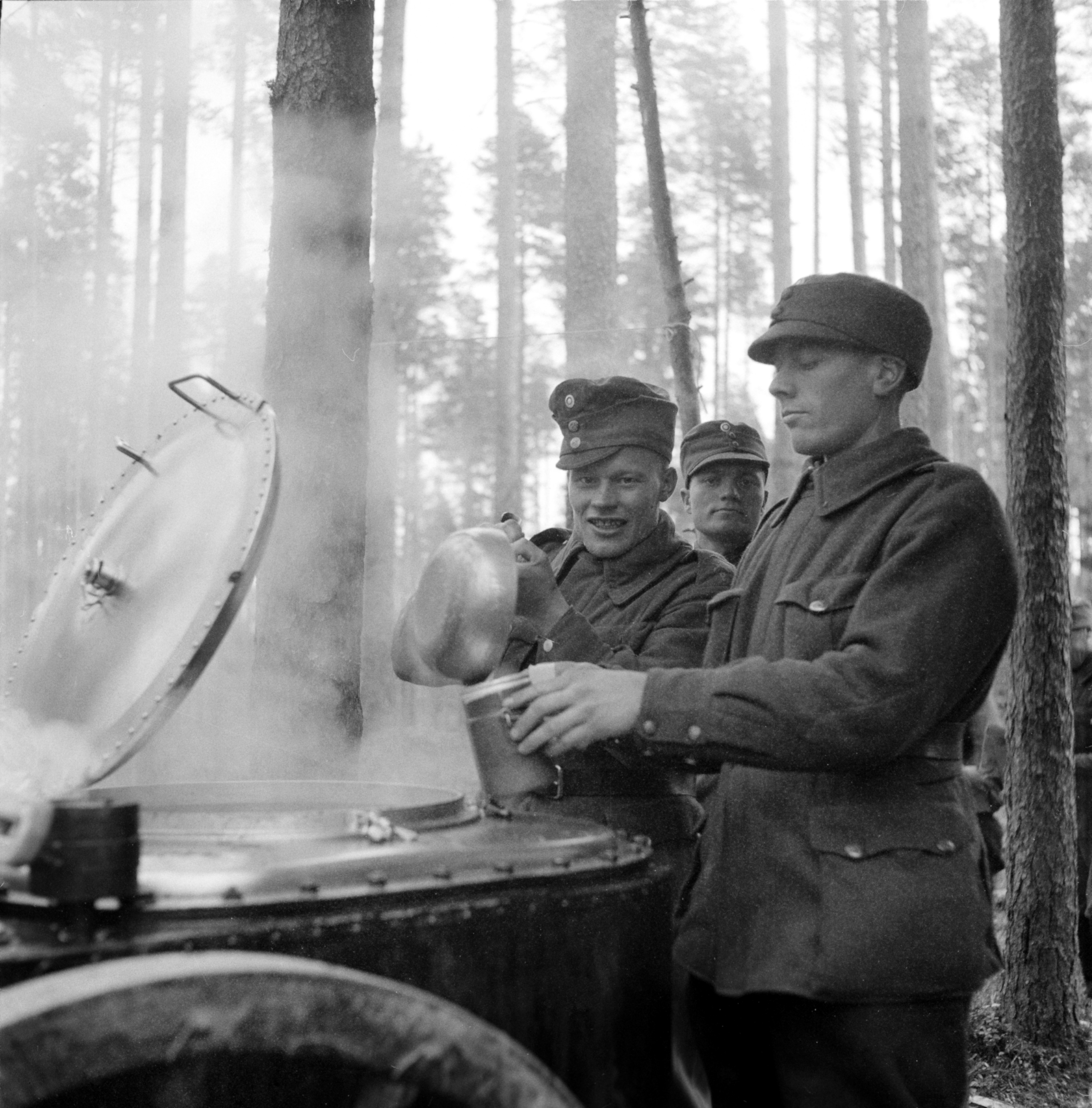
Finnish soldiers gather breakfast from a field kitchen during "additional refresher training" at the Karelian Isthmus, on 10 October 1939.

The meetings began on 12 October, with Molotov's offer of a mutual assistance pact, which the Finns immediately refused. To the Finns' surprise, Molotov dropped the offer and instead proposed an exchange of territory. The offer stipulated that the Finnish-Soviet border on the Karelian Isthmus be moved westward to a point only 30 km (19 mi) east of Viipuri (Russian: Vyborg) and that Finland destroy all existing fortifications on the Karelian Isthmus. Likewise, the delegation demanded the cession of islands in the Gulf of Finland as well as Rybachy Peninsula (Finnish: Kalastajasaarento). The Finns would also have to lease the Hanko Peninsula for 30 years and to permit the Soviets to establish a military base there. In exchange, the Soviet Union would cede Repola and Porajärvi from Eastern Karelia (2120 square miles), an area twice the size as that of the territory demanded from Finland (1000 square miles).

The Soviet offer divided the Finnish government: Gustaf Mannerheim had argued for an agreement, being pessimistic of the Finnish prospects in a war against the Soviet Union but the Finnish government was reticent in reaching an agreement out of mistrust for Stalin for fear of repeated follow-up demands, which would have put the future of Finnish sovereignty in danger. There were also those, such as Foreign Minister Eljas Erkko and Prime Minister Aimo Cajander, and the Finnish intelligence in general, who mistook the demands and the Soviet military build-up as a mere bluff on the part of Stalin, and were thus disinclined to reach an agreement.

The Finns made two counteroffers that would cede the Terijoki area to the Soviet Union. This would have doubled the distance between Leningrad and the Finnish border, but was far less than the Soviets had demanded. The Finns would also cede the islands in the Gulf of Finland, but they would not agree to lease any territory to the Soviet Union for military purposes.

On the next meeting on 23 October, Stalin lessened his demands: a reduction in the amount of land demanded in Karelia; a reduction of the Hanko garrison from 5000 to 4000 men; and reducing the length of lease from 30 years to whatever date the ongoing (second world) war in Europe would end. However, this sudden change, contrary to previous statements that Soviet demands were minimalist and thus unalterable, had surprised the Finnish government, and lead them to believe more concession may be forthcoming. Thus, Paasikivi's idea of reaching some sort of compromise by offering the Soviets the island of Jussarö and the fort of Ino were refused by Helsinki.

On 31 October, Molotov publicly announced the Soviet demands to the Supreme Soviet. This surprised the Finns, and lent credibility to Soviet claims that their demands were minimalist and thus unalterable, as it would have been impossible to reduce them without a loss of prestige after having made them public. However, the Soviet offer was eventually rejected with respect to the opinion of the public and Parliament.

At the meeting on 9 November, Paasikivi announced to the attending Stalin and Molotov the Finnish refusal to accept even their reduced demands. The Soviets were visibly surprised. Finnish Foreign Minister Väino Tanner later wrote that "the eyes of our opposite numbers opened wide". Stalin had asked "You don't even offer Ino?" This would become the final meeting: the Soviets stopped responding to further Finnish letters and on 13 November, when the Finnish delegation was recalled from Moscow, no Soviet officials came to see them off. The Finns had left under the expectation that the negotiations would continue. Instead, the Soviet Union ramped up its military preparations.

The negotiations had failed, as neither side was willing to substantially reduce their demands, nor was either side able to fully trust the other. The Finns were fearful of an encroachment on their sovereignty, while the Soviets were (claiming to be) fearful of a springboard for international enemies in Finland, in close proximity to Leningrad. No promises to the contrary managed to persuade the other. Additionally, both sides had misunderstood the others position: the Finns had assumed that the Soviets had opened up on a maximalist demand, ready to be traded down smaller. The Soviets instead had stressed the minimalist nature of their demands, and were incredulous over Finnish reluctance to agree. Finally, there was also Stalin's unwillingness or inability to accept that any territorial concessions on the part of Finland would have only been possible by a 5/6th majority in the Finnish parliament. He had mocked such a requirement, proposing that they count his and Molotov's votes, too.

=== Shelling of Mainila and Soviet intentions ===
On 26 November 1939, an incident was reported near the Soviet village of Mainila, near the border with Finland. A Soviet border guard post had been shelled by an unknown party resulting, according to Soviet reports, in the deaths of four and injuries of nine border guards. Research conducted by several Finnish and Russian historians later concluded that the shelling was a false flag operation since there were no artillery units there, and it was carried out from the Soviet side of the border by an NKVD unit with the purpose of providing the Soviets with a casus belli and a pretext to withdraw from the non-aggression pact. (Note: The Soviet role is confirmed in Nikita Khrushchev's memoirs, which states that Artillery Marshal Grigory Kulik had personally supervised the bombardment of the Soviet village.) Soviet war games held in March 1938 and 1939 had been based on a scenario in which border incidents taking place at the village of Mainila would spark the war.

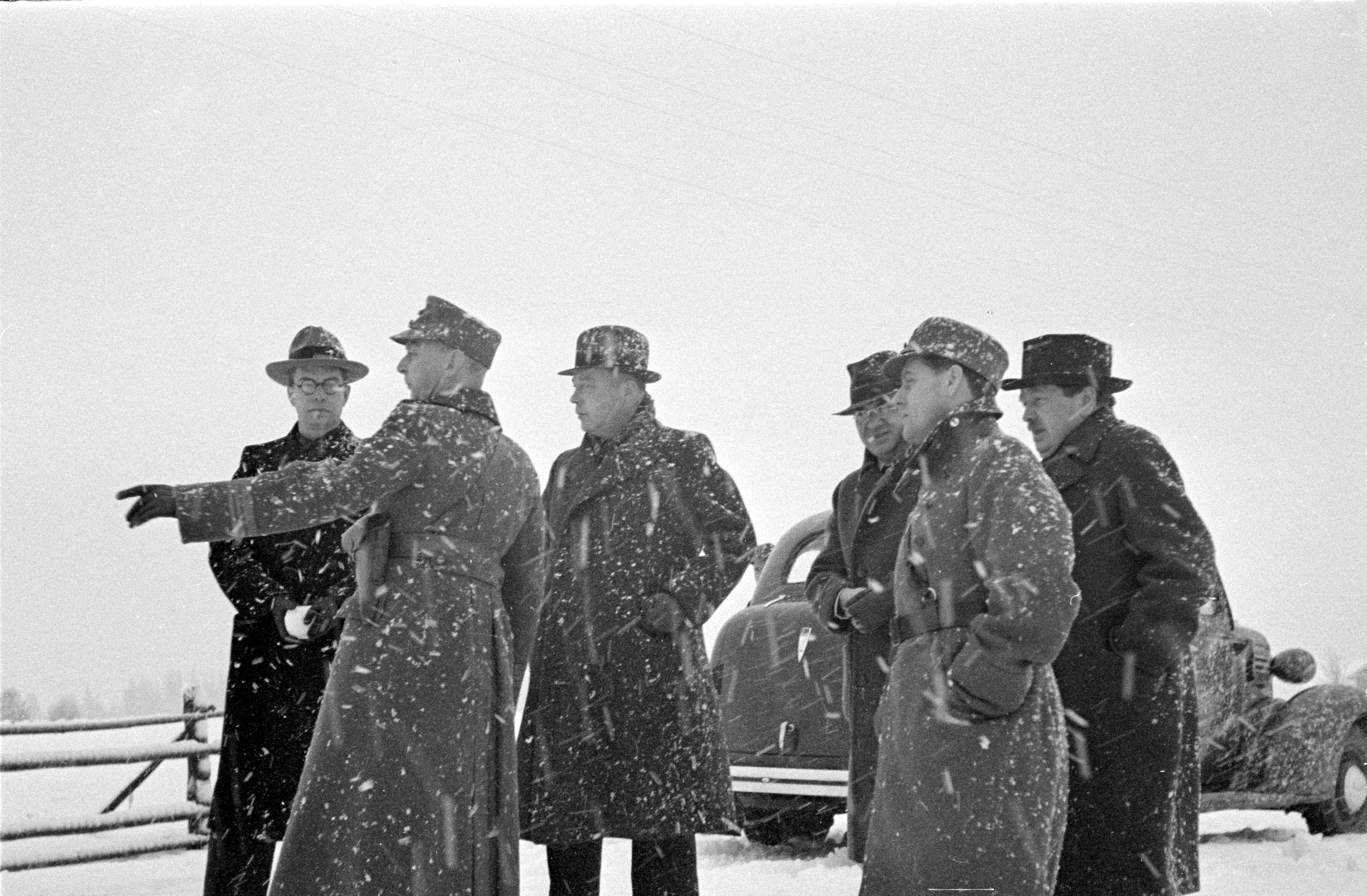
29 November 1939, foreign journalists at Mainila, where a border incident between Finland and the Soviet Union escalated into the Winter War

Molotov claimed that the incident was a Finnish artillery attack. He demanded that Finland apologise for the incident and to move its forces beyond a line 20–25 km (12–16 mi) from the border. Finland denied responsibility for the attack, rejected the demands and called for a joint Finnish–Soviet commission to examine the incident. In turn, the Soviet Union claimed that the Finnish response was hostile, renounced the non-aggression pact and severed diplomatic relations with Finland on 28 November. In the following years, Soviet historiography described the incident as Finnish provocation. Doubt on the official Soviet version was cast only in the late 1980s, during the policy of glasnost. The issue has continued to divide Russian historiography even after the end of the Soviet Union in 1991.

==== Soviet intentions ====
In 2013, Russian President Vladimir Putin stated at a meeting with military historians that the Soviets had launched the Winter War to "correct mistakes" made in determining the border with Finland after 1917. Opinion on the scale of the initial Soviet invasion decision is divided. The puppet Finnish communist government and the Molotov–Ribbentrop Pact's secret protocol is used as evidence that the Soviet Union had intended to conquer all of Finland. (Note: See the following sources:)

On 1 December 1939, the Soviet Union formed a puppet government, named the Finnish Democratic Republic, to govern Finland after Soviet conquest. (Note: See the following sources:) A declaration delivered via TASS stated:

The People's Government in its present composition regards itself as a provisional government. Immediately upon arrival in Helsinki, capital of the country, it will be reorganised and its composition enlarged by the inclusion of representatives of the various parties and groups participating in the people's front of toilers.

Soviet leaflets dropped over Helsinki on the first day of the war stated: "Finnish Comrades! We come to you not as conquerors, but as liberators of the Finnish people from the oppression of the capitalists and the landlords".

In 1939, Soviet military leadership had formulated a realistic and comprehensive plan for the occupation of Finland. However, Joseph Stalin was not pleased with the conservative pace that the operation required and demanded new plans be drawn up. With the new plans, the key deadline for Finland's capitulation was to be Stalin's 60th birthday on 21 December. Convinced of the invasion's forthcoming success, Andrei Zhdanov, chairman of the highest legislative body in the Soviet Union, commissioned a celebratory piece of music from Dmitri Shostakovich, Suite on Finnish Themes, intended to be performed as the marching bands of the Red Army paraded through Helsinki. The Soviets were confident that the Western powers would not come to Finland's aid. Ivan Maisky, the Soviet ambassador to the UK, said: "Who would help? The Swedes? The British? The Americans? There's no way in hell. There will be a fuss in the press, moral support, moaning and whining. But troops, aircraft, cannons, and machine guns – no."

Hungarian historian István Ravasz wrote that the Soviet Central Committee had set out in 1939 that the former borders of the Tsarist Empire were to be restored, including Finland. American political scientist Dan Reiter stated that the Soviets "sought to impose a regime change" and thus "achieve absolute victory". He quoted Molotov, who had commented in November 1939 on the regime change plan to a Soviet ambassador that the new government "will not be Soviet, but one of a democratic republic. Nobody is going to set up Soviets over there, but we hope it will be a government we can come to terms with as to ensure the security of Leningrad". According to Russian historian Yuri Kilin, the Soviet terms encompassed the strongest fortified approaches of the Finnish defences for a reason. He claimed that Stalin had little hope for such a deal but would play for time for the ongoing mobilisation. He stated the objective as being to secure Finland from being used as a staging ground by means of regime change.

Others argue against the idea of a complete Soviet conquest. American historian William R. Trotter asserted that Stalin's objective was to secure Leningrad's flank from a possible German invasion through Finland. He stated that "the strongest argument" against a Soviet intention of full conquest is that it did not happen in either 1939 or during the Continuation War in 1944 even though Stalin "could have done so with comparative ease". Bradley Lightbody wrote that the "entire Soviet aim had been to make the Soviet border more secure". In 2002, Russian historian A. Chubaryan stated that no documents had been found in Russian archives that support a Soviet plan to annex Finland. Rather, the objective was to gain Finnish territory and to reinforce Soviet influence in the region.

American historian Stephen Kotkin also shares the position that the Soviet Union did not aim for annexation. He points out the different treatment Finland was given, compared to the Baltics: unlike the pacts of mutual assistance that the Baltics were pressured into, resulting in their total Sovietization, the Soviets demanded limited territorial concessions from Finland, and even offered land in return, which would not have made sense if full Sovietization was intended. Also, according to Kotkin, Stalin seemed to be genuinely interested in reaching an agreement during the negotiations: he had personally attended six of the seven meetings with the Finns, and had multiple times reduced his demands. However, mutual mistrust and misunderstandings would mar the negotiations, producing an impasse.

== Opposing forces ==
=== Soviet military plan ===
Before the war, Soviet leadership had expected total victory within a few weeks. The Red Army had just completed the invasion of eastern Poland at a cost of fewer than 4,000 casualties after Germany attacked Poland from the west. Stalin's expectations of a quick Soviet triumph were backed up by politician Andrei Zhdanov and military strategist Kliment Voroshilov, but other generals were more reserved. Red Army Chief of Staff Boris Shaposhnikov advocated a narrow-front assault right on the Karelian isthmus. Additionally, Shaposhnikov argued for a fuller build-up, extensive fire support and logistical preparations, a rational order of battle and the deployment of the army's best units. Zhdanov's military commander, Kirill Meretskov, reported, "The terrain of coming operations is split by lakes, rivers, swamps, and is almost entirely covered by forests.... The proper use of our forces will be difficult". These doubts were not reflected in Meretskov's troop deployments, and he publicly announced that the Finnish campaign would take two weeks at most. Soviet soldiers had even been warned not to cross the border mistakenly into Sweden.

Stalin's purges in the 1930s had devastated the officer corps of the Red Army; those purged included three of its five marshals, 220 of its 264 division or higher-level commanders and 36,761 officers of all ranks. Fewer than half of all the officers remained. They were commonly replaced by soldiers who were less competent but more loyal to their superiors. Unit commanders were overseen by political commissars, whose approval was needed to approve and ratify military decisions, which they evaluated based on their political merits. The dual system further complicated the Soviet chain of command and annulled the independence of commanding officers.

After the Soviet success at the Battles of Khalkhin Gol against Japan, on the Soviet Union's eastern border, Soviet High Command had divided into two factions. One side was represented by the Spanish Civil War veterans General Pavel Rychagov from the Soviet Air Forces; the tank expert General Dmitry Pavlov and Stalin's favourite general, Marshal Grigory Kulik, the chief of artillery. The other faction was led by Khalkhin Gol veterans General Georgy Zhukov of the Red Army and General Grigory Kravchenko of the Soviet Air Forces. Under this divided command structure, the lessons of the Soviet Union's "first real war on a massive scale using tanks, artillery, and aircraft" at Khalkin Gol went unheeded. As a result, Russian BT tanks were less successful during the Winter War, and it took the Soviet Union three months and over a million men to accomplish what Zhukov had managed at Khalkhin Gol in ten days (albeit in completely different circumstances).

=== Soviet order of battle ===
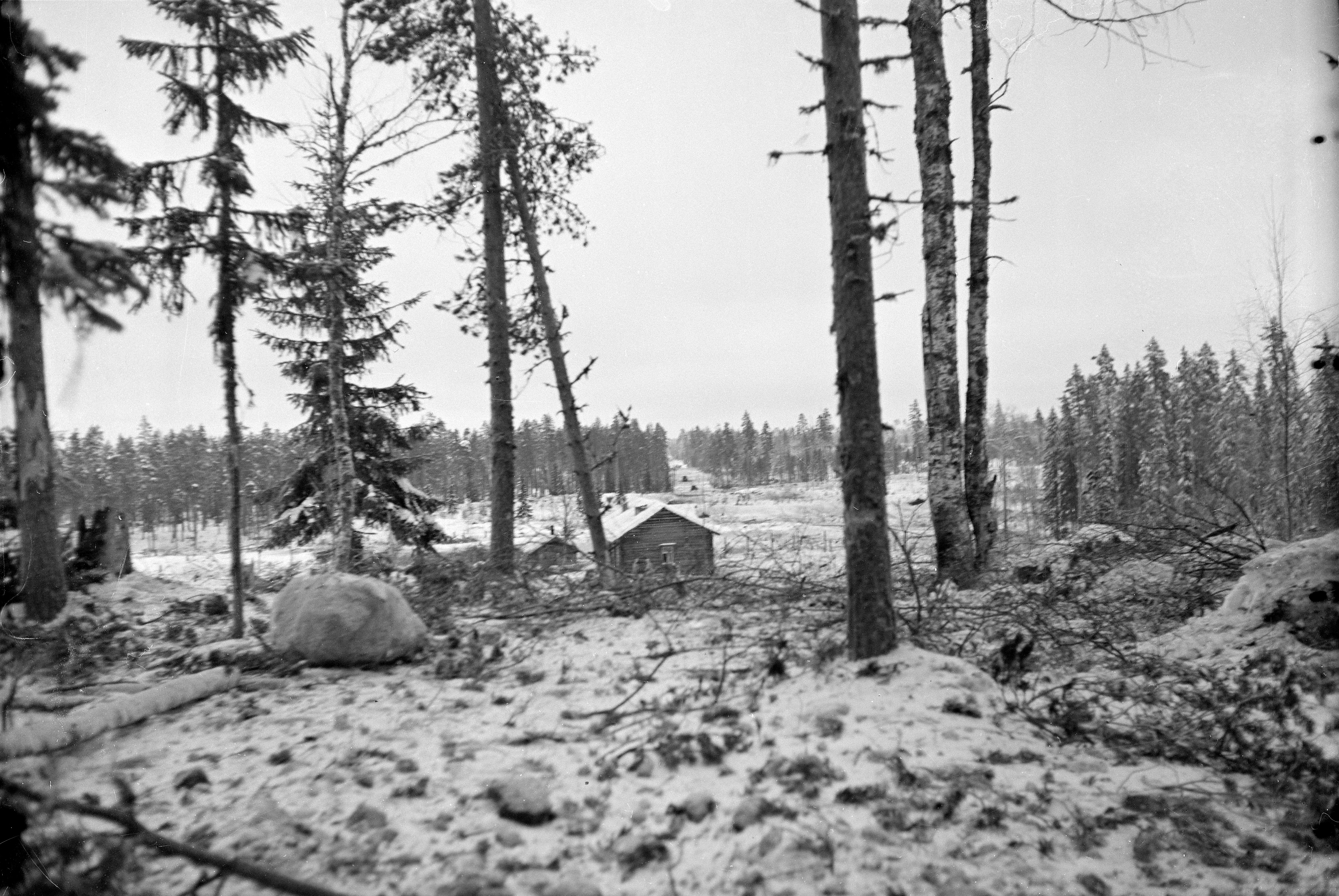
Dense forests of Ladoga Karelia at Kollaa. A Soviet tank on the road in the background according to the photographer.

Soviet generals were impressed by the success of German Blitzkrieg tactics, but they had been tailored to conditions in Central Europe, with its dense well-mapped network of paved roads. Armies fighting there had recognised supply and communications centres, which could be easily targeted by armoured vehicle regiments. Finnish Army centres, in contrast, were deep inside the country. There were no paved roads, and even gravel or dirt roads were scarce. Most of the terrain consisted of trackless forests and swamps. The war correspondent John Langdon-Davies observed the landscape: "Every acre of its surface was created to be the despair of an attacking military force". Waging Blitzkrieg in Finland was a highly-difficult proposition, and according to Trotter, the Red Army failed to meet the level of tactical co-ordination and local initiative that would be required to execute such tactics in Finland.

Commander of the Leningrad Military District Kiril Meretskov initially ran the overall operation against the Finns. The command was passed on 9 December 1939 to the General Staff Supreme Command (later known as Stavka), directly under Kliment Voroshilov (chairman), Nikolai Kuznetsov, Stalin and Boris Shaposhnikov. On 28 December, when Stalin asked for volunteers to take over military command, Semyon Timoshenko offered himself on the condition that he be allowed to implement Shaposhnikov's initial plan of a focused attack on the Karelian Isthmus to break the Mannerheim Line; it was accepted. In January 1940, the Leningrad Military District was reformed and renamed "North-Western Front".

The Soviet forces were organised as follows:

- The 7th Army, comprising nine divisions, a tank corps and three tank brigades, was located on the Karelian Isthmus. Its objective was to quickly overrun the Finnish defences on the Karelian Isthmus and conquer Viipuri. From there, the 7th Army was to continue towards Lappeenranta, then turn west towards Lahti, before the final push to the capital Helsinki. The force was later divided into the 7th and 13th Armies.
- The 8th Army, comprising six divisions and a tank brigade, was north of Lake Ladoga. Its mission was to execute a flanking manoeuvre around the northern shore of Lake Ladoga to strike at the rear of the Mannerheim Line.
- The 9th Army was positioned to strike into Central Finland through the Kainuu region. It was composed of three divisions with one more on its way. Its mission was to thrust westward to cut Finland in half.
- The 14th Army, comprising three divisions, was based in Murmansk. Its objectives were to capture the Arctic port of Petsamo and then advance to the town of Rovaniemi.

=== Finnish order of battle ===
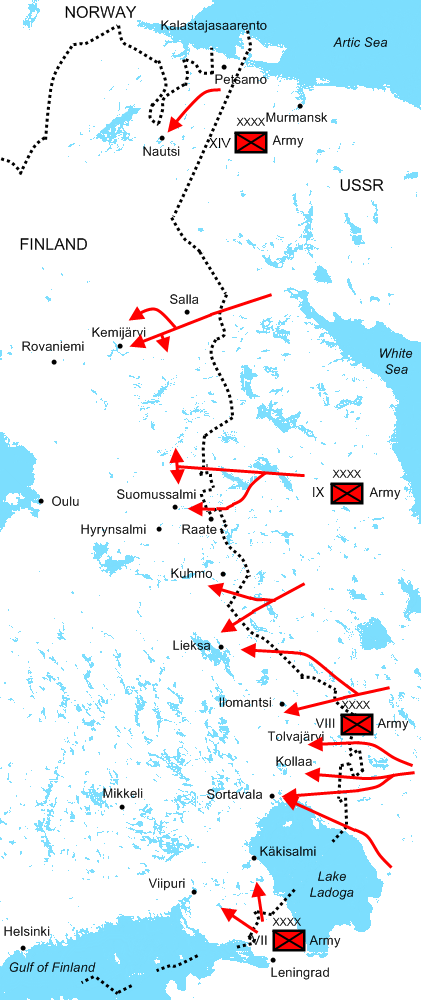
Offensives of the four Soviet armies from 30 November to 22 December 1939 displayed in red

The Finnish strategy was dictated by geography. The 1,340 km (830 mi) (Note: This is the border length currently, not before the Winter War.) border with the Soviet Union was mostly impassable except along a handful of unpaved roads. In prewar calculations, the Finnish Defence Command, which had established its wartime headquarters at Mikkeli, had estimated seven Soviet divisions on the Karelian Isthmus and no more than five along the whole border north of Lake Ladoga. In the estimation, the manpower ratio would have favoured the attacker by three to one. The true ratio was much higher, however, since for example, 12 Soviet divisions were deployed north of Lake Ladoga.

Finland had a large force of reservists that trained in regular maneuvers, some of whom had experience from the Finnish Civil War. The soldiers were also almost universally trained in basic survival techniques, such as skiing. While the Finnish Army was not able to equip all of its soldiers with proper uniforms at the outbreak of war, its reservists were equipped with warm civilian clothing. The sparsely populated, highly agrarian Finland had to draft so many of its working men that the Finnish economy became massively strained due to a lack of workers. An even greater problem than the lack of soldiers was the lack of materiel, as foreign shipments of anti-tank weapons and aircraft had arrived only in small quantities. Stockpiles of cartridges, shells, and fuel were sufficient to last only 19 to 60 days. The ammunition shortage meant that the Finns could seldom afford counter-battery or saturation fire. Finnish tank forces were operationally nonexistent. The ammunition situation was somewhat alleviated by the fact that the Finns were mostly armed with Mosin–Nagant rifles dating from the Finnish Civil War, which used the same 7.62×54mmR cartridge as the Red Army. Finnish soldiers occasionally resorted to looting the bodies of dead Soviet soldiers in order to maintain their supply of ammunition.

The Finnish forces were positioned as follows:

- The Army of the Isthmus was composed of six divisions under the command of Hugo Österman. The II Army Corps was positioned on its right flank and the III Army Corps, on its left flank.
- The IV Army Corps was located north of Lake Ladoga. It was composed of two divisions under Juho Heiskanen, who was soon replaced by Woldemar Hägglund.
- The North Finland Group was a collection of White Guards, border guards and drafted reservist units under Wiljo Tuompo.

== Soviet invasion ==
=== Start of invasion and political operations ===
On 30 November 1939, Soviet forces invaded Finland with 21 divisions, totalling 450,000 men, and bombed Helsinki, killing about 100 citizens and destroying more than 50 buildings. In response to international criticism, Soviet Foreign Minister Vyacheslav Molotov stated that the Soviet Air Force was not bombing Finnish cities but rather dropping humanitarian aid to the starving Finnish population; the bombs were sarcastically dubbed Molotov bread baskets by Finns. The Finnish statesman J. K. Paasikivi commented that the Soviet attack without a declaration of war violated three separate non-aggression pacts: the Treaty of Tartu, which was signed in 1920, the non-aggression pact between Finland and the Soviet Union, which was signed in 1932 and again in 1934; and also the Covenant of the League of Nations, which the Soviet Union signed in 1934. Field Marshal C.G.E. Mannerheim was appointed Commander-in-Chief of the Finnish Defence Forces after the Soviet attack. In a further reshuffling, Aimo Cajander's caretaker cabinet was replaced by Risto Ryti and his cabinet, with Väinö Tanner as foreign minister because of opposition to Cajander's prewar politics. Finland brought the matter of the Soviet invasion before the League of Nations. The League expelled the Soviet Union on 14 December 1939 and exhorted its members to aid Finland.

Headed by Otto Wille Kuusinen, the Finnish Democratic Republic puppet government operated in the parts of Finnish Karelia occupied by the Soviets, and was also referred to as the "Terijoki Government", after the village of Terijoki, the first settlement captured by the advancing Red Army. After the war, the puppet government was reabsorbed into the Soviet Union. From the very outset of the war, working-class Finns stood behind the legitimate government in Helsinki. Finnish national unity against the Soviet invasion was later called the spirit of the Winter War.

=== First battles and Soviet advance to Mannerheim Line ===
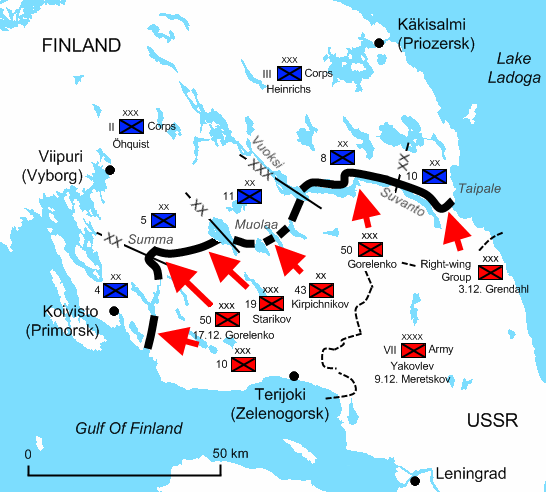
The situation on 7 December: Soviets have reached the Mannerheim Line on the Karelian Isthmus. Finnish division (XX) or corps (XXX) Soviet division (XX), corps (XXX) or army (XXXX)

The array of Finnish defence structures that during the war started to be called the Mannerheim Line was located on the Karelian Isthmus approximately 30 to 75 km (19 to 47 mi) from the Soviet border. The Red Army soldiers on the Isthmus numbered 250,000, facing 130,000 Finns. The Finnish command deployed a defence in depth of about 21,000 men in the area in front of the Mannerheim Line to delay and damage the Red Army before it reached the line. In combat, the most severe cause of confusion among Finnish soldiers was Soviet tanks. The Finns had few anti-tank weapons and insufficient training in modern anti-tank tactics. According to Trotter, the favoured Soviet armoured tactic was a simple frontal charge, the weaknesses of which could be exploited. The Finns learned that at close range, tanks could be dealt with in many ways; for example, logs and crowbars jammed into the bogie wheels would often immobilise a tank. Soon, Finns fielded a better ad hoc weapon, the Molotov cocktail, a glass bottle filled with flammable liquids and with a simple hand-lit fuse. Molotov cocktails were eventually mass-produced by the Finnish Alko alcoholic-beverage corporation and bundled with matches with which to light them. 80 Soviet tanks were destroyed in the border zone engagements.

By 6 December, all of the Finnish covering forces had withdrawn to the Mannerheim Line. The Red Army began its first major attack against the Line in Taipale – the area between the shore of Lake Ladoga, the Taipale river and the Suvanto waterway. Along the Suvanto sector, the Finns had a slight advantage of elevation and dry ground to dig into. The Finnish artillery had scouted the area and made fire plans in advance, anticipating a Soviet assault. The Battle of Taipale began with a forty-hour Soviet artillery preparation. After the barrage, Soviet infantry attacked across open ground but was repulsed with heavy casualties. From 6 to 12 December, the Red Army continued to try to engage using only a single division. Next, the Red Army strengthened its artillery and deployed tanks and the 150th Rifle Division forward to the Taipale front. On 14 December, the bolstered Soviet forces launched a new attack but were pushed back again. A third Soviet division entered the fight but performed poorly and panicked under shell fire. The assaults continued without success, and the Red Army suffered heavy losses. One typical Soviet attack during the battle lasted just an hour but left 1,000 dead and 27 tanks strewn on the ice. North of Lake Ladoga on the Ladoga Karelia front, the defending Finnish units relied on the terrain. Ladoga Karelia, a large forest wilderness, did not have road networks for the modern Red Army. The Soviet 8th Army had extended a new railroad line to the border, which could double the supply capability on the front. On 12 December, the advancing Soviet 139th Rifle Division, supported by the 56th Rifle Division, was defeated by a much smaller Finnish force under Paavo Talvela in Tolvajärvi, the first Finnish victory of the war.

In Central and Northern Finland, roads were few and the terrain hostile. The Finns did not expect large-scale Soviet attacks, but the Soviets sent eight divisions, heavily supported by armour and artillery. The 155th Rifle Division attacked at Ilomantsi and Lieksa, and further north the 44th attacked at Kuhmo. The 163rd Rifle Division was deployed at Suomussalmi and ordered to cut Finland in half by advancing on Raate road. In Finnish Lapland, the Soviet 88th and 122nd Rifle Divisions attacked at Salla. The Arctic port of Petsamo was attacked by the 104th Mountain Rifle Division by sea and land, supported by naval gunfire.

== Operations from December to January ==
=== Weather conditions ===
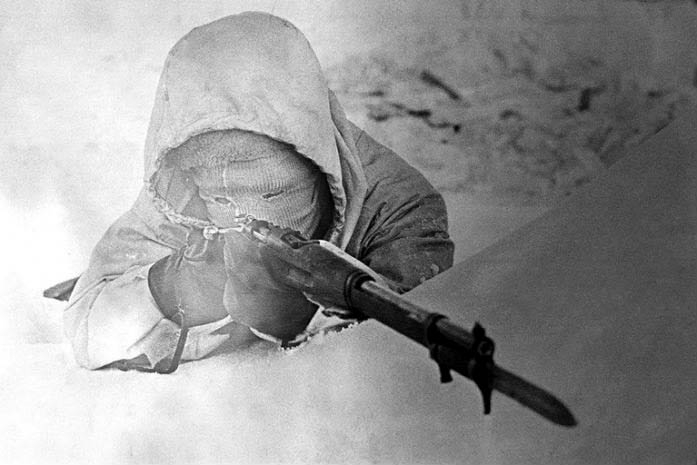
Swedish volunteer with a Carl Gustaf M/96 rifle wearing a face wool mask

The winter of 1939–40 was exceptionally cold with the Karelian Isthmus experiencing a record low temperature of −43 °C (−45 °F) on 16 January 1940. At the beginning of the war, only those Finnish soldiers who were in active service had uniforms and weapons. The rest had to make do with their own clothing, which for many soldiers was their normal winter clothing with a semblance of insignia added. Finnish soldiers were skilled in cross-country skiing. The cold, snow, forest, and long hours of darkness were factors that the Finns could use to their advantage. The Finns dressed in layers, and the ski troopers wore a lightweight white snow cape. This snow-camouflage made the ski troopers almost invisible so that they could more easily execute guerrilla attacks against Soviet columns. At the beginning of the war, Soviet tanks were painted in standard olive drab and men dressed in regular khaki uniforms. Not until late January 1940 did the Soviets paint their equipment white and issue snowsuits to their infantry.

Most Soviet soldiers had proper winter clothes, but this was not the case with every unit. In the Battle of Suomussalmi, thousands of Soviet soldiers died of frostbite. The Soviet troops also lacked skill in skiing, so soldiers were restricted to movement by road and were forced to move in long columns. The Red Army lacked proper winter tents, and troops had to sleep in improvised shelters. Some Soviet units incurred frostbite casualties as high as ten per cent even before crossing the Finnish border. However, the cold weather did give an advantage to Soviet tanks, as they could move over frozen terrain and bodies of water, rather than being immobilised in swamps and mud. According to Krivosheev, at least 61,506 Soviet troops were sick or frostbitten during the war.

=== Finnish guerrilla tactics ===
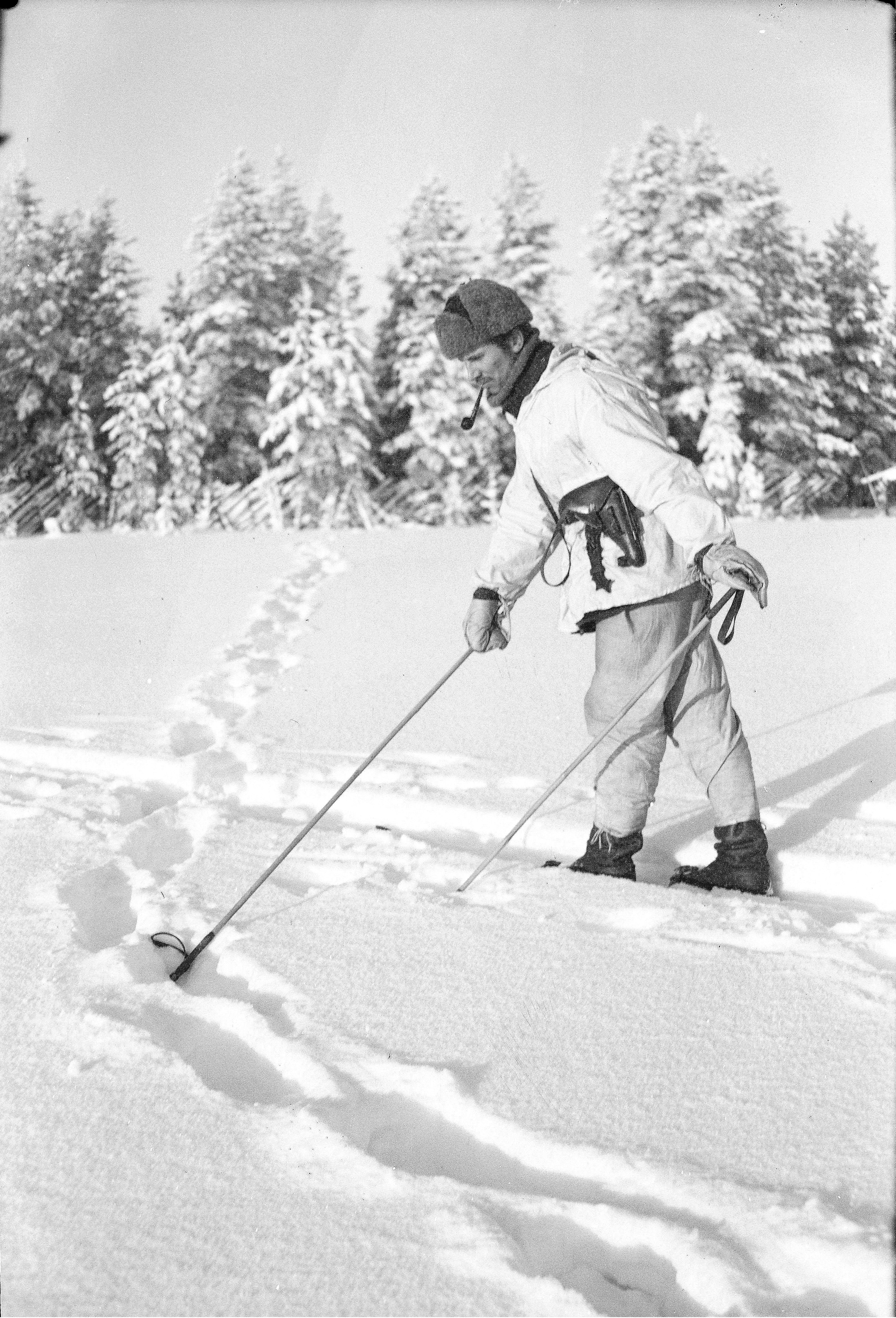
Soviet tracks at Kianta Lake, Suomussalmi during a Finnish pursuit in December 1939. Nordic combined skier Timo Murama is pictured.

In battles from Ladoga Karelia to the Arctic port of Petsamo, the Finns used guerrilla tactics. The Red Army was superior in numbers and material, but Finns used the advantages of speed, manoeuvre warfare and economy of force. Particularly on the Ladoga Karelia front and during the Battle of Raate Road, the Finns isolated smaller portions of numerically superior Soviet forces. With Soviet forces divided into smaller groups, the Finns dealt with them individually and attacked from all sides.

For many of the encircled Soviet troops in a pocket (called a motti in Finnish, originally meaning 1 m^{3} (35 cu ft) of firewood), staying alive was an ordeal comparable to combat. The men were freezing and starving and endured poor sanitary conditions. Historian William R. Trotter described these conditions as follows: "The Soviet soldier had no choice. If he refused to fight, he would be shot. If he tried to sneak through the forest, he would freeze to death. And surrender was no option for him; Soviet propaganda had told him how the Finns would torture prisoners to death." The problem however was that the Finns were mostly too weak to fully exploit their success. Some of the pockets of encircled Soviet soldiers held out for weeks and even months, binding a huge number of Finnish forces.

=== Battles of the Mannerheim Line ===
The terrain on the Karelian Isthmus did not allow guerrilla tactics, so the Finns were forced to resort to the more conventional Mannerheim Line, with its flanks protected by large bodies of water. Soviet propaganda claimed that it was as strong as or even stronger than the Maginot Line. Finnish historians, for their part, have belittled the line's strength, insisting that it was mostly conventional trenches and log-covered dugouts. The Finns had built 221 strong-points along the Karelian Isthmus, mostly in the early 1920s. Many were extended in the late 1930s. Despite these defensive preparations, even the most fortified section of the Mannerheim Line had only one reinforced-concrete bunker per kilometre. Overall, the line was weaker than similar lines in mainland Europe. According to the Finns, the real strength of the line was the "stubborn defenders with a lot of sisu" – a Finnish idiom roughly translated as "guts, fighting spirit".

On the eastern side of the Isthmus, the Red Army attempted to break through the Mannerheim Line at the battle of Taipale. On the western side, Soviet units faced the Finnish line at Summa, near the city of Viipuri, on 16 December. The Finns had built 41 reinforced-concrete bunkers in the Summa area, making the defensive line in this area stronger than anywhere else on the Karelian Isthmus. Because of a mistake in planning, the nearby Munasuo swamp had a 1-kilometre (0.62 mi)-wide gap in the line. During the First Battle of Summa, a number of Soviet tanks broke through the thin line on 19 December, but the Soviets could not benefit from the situation because of insufficient co-operation between branches of service. The Finns remained in their trenches, allowing the Soviet tanks to move freely behind the Finnish line, as the Finns had no proper anti-tank weapons. The Finns succeeded in repelling the main Soviet assault. The tanks, stranded behind enemy lines, attacked the strongpoints at random until they were eventually destroyed, 20 in all. By 22 December, the battle ended in a Finnish victory.

The Soviet advance was stopped at the Mannerheim Line. Red Army troops suffered from poor morale and a shortage of supplies, eventually refusing to participate in more suicidal frontal attacks. The Finns, led by General Harald Öhquist, decided to launch a counter-attack and encircle three Soviet divisions into a motti near Viipuri on 23 December. Öhquist's plan was bold; however it failed. The Finns lost 1,300 men, and the Soviets were later estimated to have lost a similar number.

=== Battles in Ladoga Karelia and North Karelia ===
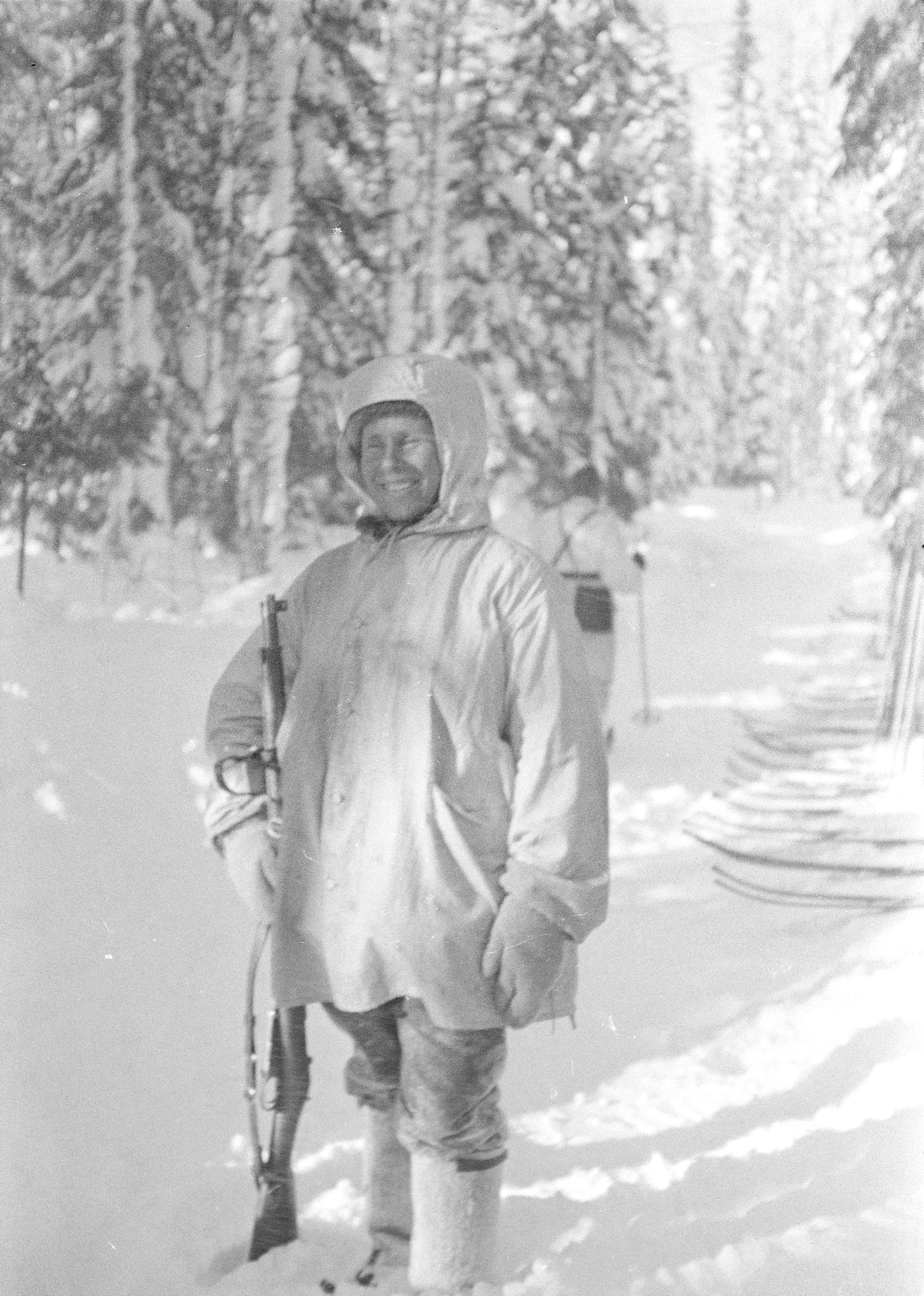
Simo Häyhä, the legendary Finnish sniper, known as "the White Death" in Finnish wartime propaganda

The strength of the Red Army north of Lake Ladoga in Ladoga Karelia surprised the Finnish Headquarters. Two Finnish divisions were deployed there, the 12th Division led by Lauri Tiainen and the 13th Division led by Hannu Hannuksela. They also had a support group of three brigades, bringing their total strength to over 30,000. The Soviets deployed a division for almost every road leading west to the Finnish border. The 8th Army was led by Ivan Khabarov, who was replaced by Grigory Shtern on 13 December. The Soviets' mission was to destroy the Finnish troops in the area of Ladoga Karelia and advance into the area between Sortavala and Joensuu within 10 days. The Soviets had a 3:1 advantage in manpower and a 5:1 advantage in artillery, as well as air supremacy.

Finnish forces panicked and retreated in front of the overwhelming Red Army. The commander of the Finnish IV Army Corps Juho Heiskanen was replaced by Woldemar Hägglund on 4 December. On 7 December, in the middle of the Ladoga Karelian front, Finnish units retreated near the small stream of Kollaa. The waterway itself did not offer protection, but alongside it, there were ridges up to 10 m (33 ft) high. The ensuing Battle of Kollaa lasted until the end of the war. A memorable quote, "Kollaa holds" (Finnish: Kollaa kestää) became a legendary motto among Finns. Further contributing to the legend of Kollaa was the sniper Simo Häyhä, dubbed "the White Death" in Finnish media, credited with over 500 kills in the war. Captain Aarne Juutilainen, dubbed "the Terror of Morocco", also became a living legend in the Battle of Kollaa. To the north, the Finns retreated from Ägläjärvi to Tolvajärvi on 5 December and then repelled a Soviet offensive in the battle of Tolvajärvi on 11 December.

In the south, two Soviet divisions were united on the northern side of the Lake Ladoga coastal road. As before, these divisions were trapped as the more mobile Finnish units counterattacked from the north to flank the Soviet columns. On 19 December, the Finns temporarily ceased their assaults due to exhaustion. It was not until the period of 6–16 January 1940 that the Finns resumed their offensive, dividing Soviet divisions into smaller mottis. Contrary to Finnish expectations, the encircled Soviet divisions did not try to break through to the east but instead entrenched. They were expecting reinforcements and supplies to arrive by air. As the Finns lacked the necessary heavy artillery equipment and were short of men, they often did not directly attack the mottis they had created; instead, they worked to eliminate only the most dangerous threats. Often the motti tactic was not applied as a strategy, but as a Finnish adaptation to the behaviour of Soviet troops under fire. In spite of the cold and hunger, the Soviet troops did not surrender easily but fought bravely, often entrenching their tanks to be used as pillboxes and building timber dugouts. Some specialist Finnish soldiers were called in to attack the mottis; the most famous of them was Major Matti Aarnio, or "Motti-Matti" as he became known.

In North Karelia, Soviet forces were outmanoeuvred at Ilomantsi and Lieksa. The Finns used effective guerrilla tactics, taking special advantage of their superior skiing skills and snow-white layered clothing and executing surprise ambushes and raids. By the end of December, the Soviets decided to retreat and transfer resources to more critical fronts.

=== Battles in Kainuu ===
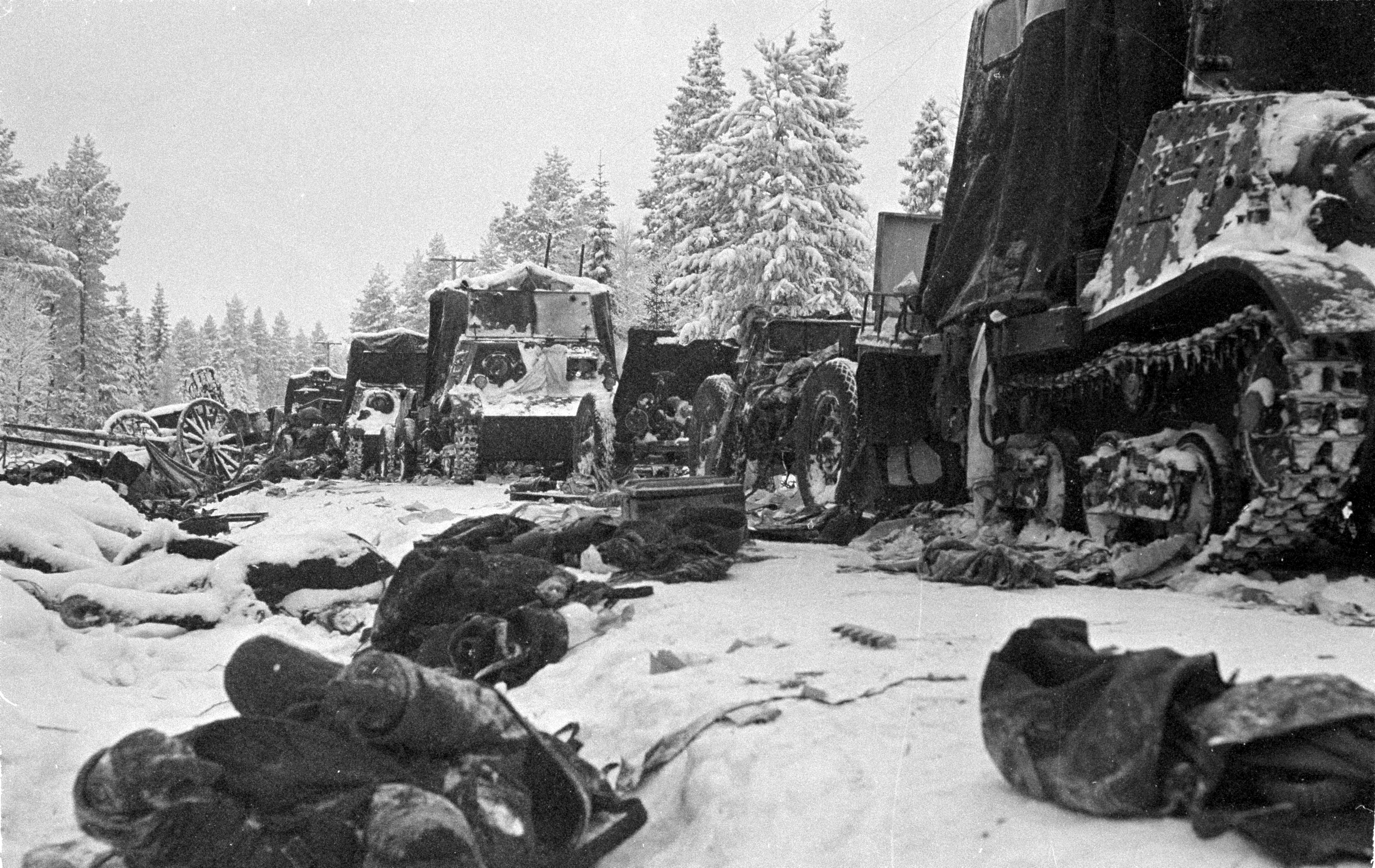
Dead Soviet soldiers and their equipment at Raate Road, Suomussalmi, after being ambushed and encircled at the Battle of Raate Road

The Suomussalmi–Raate engagement was a double operation which would later be used by military academics as a classic example of what well-led troops and innovative tactics can do against a much larger adversary. In 1939, Suomussalmi was a municipality of 4,000 inhabitants, with long lakes, wild forests and few roads. The Finnish command believed that the Soviets would not attack there, but the Red Army committed two divisions to the Kainuu area with orders to cross the wilderness, capture the city of Oulu and effectively cut Finland in two. There were two roads leading to Suomussalmi from the frontier: the northern Juntusranta road and the southern Raate road.

The Battle of Raate Road, which occurred during the month-long Battle of Suomussalmi, resulted in one of the largest Soviet losses in the Winter War. The Soviet 44th and parts of the 163rd Rifle Division, comprising about 14,000 troops, were almost completely destroyed by a Finnish ambush as they marched along the forest road. A small unit blocked the Soviet advance while Finnish Colonel Hjalmar Siilasvuo and his 9th Division cut off the retreat route, split the enemy force into smaller mottis, and then proceeded to destroy the remnants in detail as they retreated. The Soviets suffered 7,000–9,000 casualties; the Finnish units, 400. The Finnish troops captured dozens of tanks, artillery pieces, anti-tank guns, hundreds of trucks, almost 2,000 horses, thousands of rifles, and much-needed ammunition and medical supplies. So sure of their victory had the Soviets been that a military band, complete with instruments, banners and notes, was travelling with the 44th Division to perform in a victory parade. The Finns found their instruments among the captured materiel.

=== Battles in Finnish Lapland ===
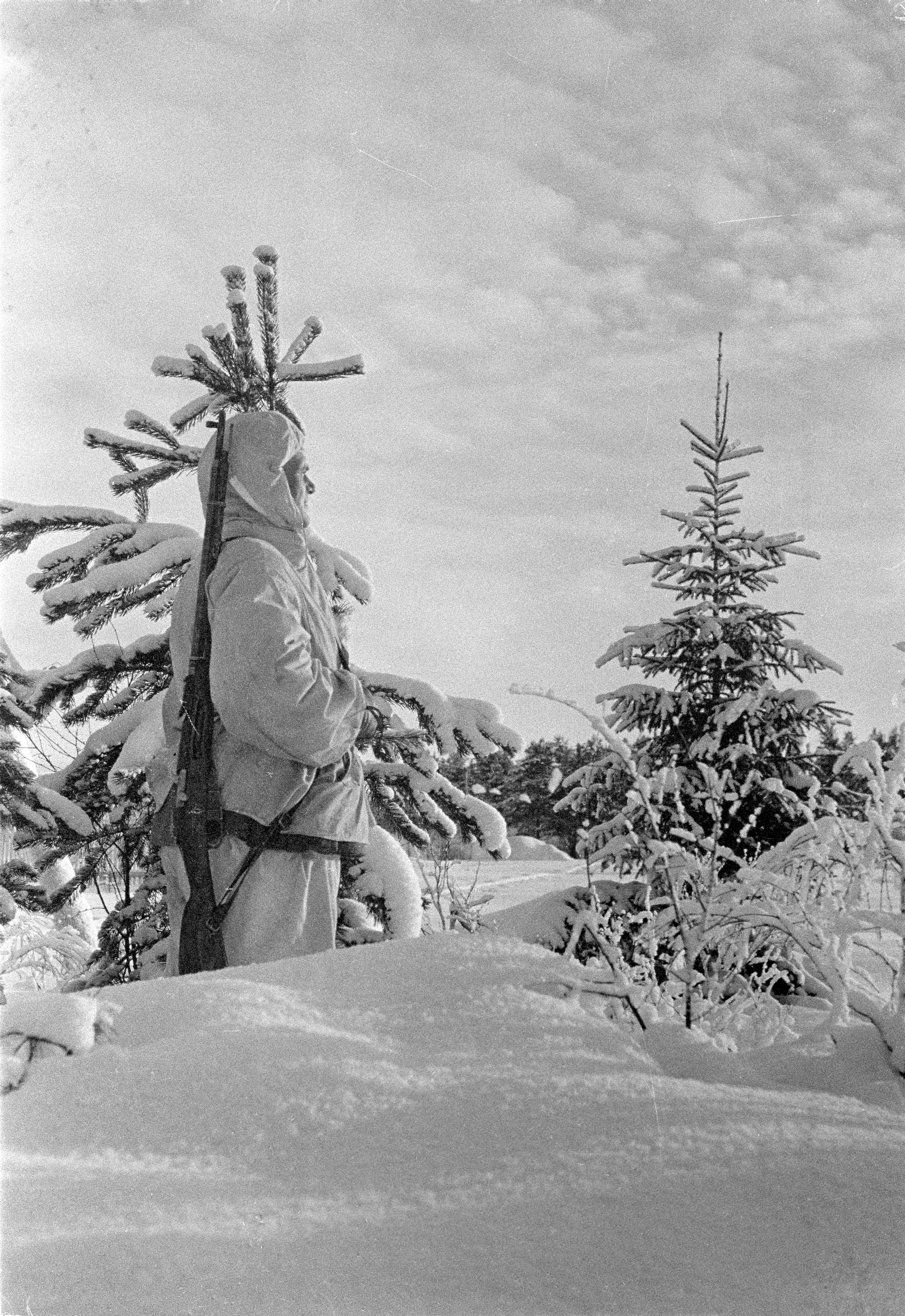
A Finnish soldier on guard near Kemijärvi in February 1940

The Finnish area of Lapland, bestriding the Arctic Circle, is sparsely developed, with little daylight and persistent snow-cover during winter; the Finns expected nothing more than raiding parties and reconnaissance patrols. Instead, the Soviets sent full divisions. On 11 December, the Finns rearranged the defence of Lapland and detached the Lapland Group from the North Finland Group. The group was placed under the command of Kurt Wallenius.

In southern Lapland, near the village of Salla, the Soviet 88th and 122nd Divisions, totalling 35,000 men, advanced. In the Battle of Salla, the Soviets proceeded easily to Salla, where the road split. Further ahead was Kemijärvi, while the fork to Pelkosenniemi led northwest. On 17 December, the Soviet northern group, comprising an infantry regiment, a battalion, and a company of tanks, was outflanked by a Finnish battalion. The 122nd retreated, abandoning much of its heavy equipment and vehicles. Following this success, the Finns shuttled reinforcements to the defensive line in front of Kemijärvi. The Soviets hammered the defensive line without success. The Finns counter-attacked, and the Soviets retreated to a new defensive line where they stayed for the rest of the war.

To the north was Finland's only ice-free port in the Arctic, Petsamo. The Finns lacked the manpower to defend it fully, as the main front was distant at the Karelian Isthmus. In the Battle of Petsamo, the Soviet 104th Division attacked the Finnish 104th Independent Cover Company. The Finns abandoned Petsamo and concentrated on delaying actions. The area was treeless, windy, and relatively low, offering little defensible terrain. The almost constant darkness and extreme temperatures of the Lapland winter benefited the Finns, who executed guerrilla attacks against Soviet supply lines and patrols. As a result, the Soviet movements were halted by the efforts of one-fifth as many Finns.

== Aerial warfare ==
=== Soviet Air Force ===
The Soviet Union enjoyed air superiority throughout the war. The Soviet Air Force, supporting the Red Army's invasion with about 2,500 aircraft (the most common type being Tupolev SB), was not as effective as the Soviets might have hoped. The material damage by the bomb raids was slight as Finland offered few valuable targets for strategic bombing. The city of Tampere was one of the most important targets because it was an important railway junction, and also housed State Aircraft Factory and the Tampere Linen and Iron Industry premises, which manufactured munitions and weapons, including grenade launchers. Often, targets were village depots with little value. The country had few modern highways in the interior, therefore making the railways the main targets for bombers. Rail tracks were cut thousands of times but the Finns hastily repaired them and service resumed within a matter of hours. The Soviet Air Force learned from its early mistakes, and by late February instituted more effective tactics.

The largest bombing raid against the capital of Finland, Helsinki, occurred on the first day of the war. The capital was bombed only a few times thereafter. All in all, Soviet bombings cost Finland five per cent of its total man-hour production. Nevertheless, Soviet air attacks affected thousands of civilians, killing 957. The Soviets recorded 2,075 bombing attacks in 516 localities. The city of Viipuri, a major Soviet objective close to the Karelian Isthmus front, was almost levelled by nearly 12,000 bombs. No attacks on civilian targets were mentioned in Soviet radio or newspaper reports. In January 1940, the Soviet Pravda newspaper continued to lie that no civilian targets in Finland had been struck, even accidentally. It is estimated that the Soviet air force lost about 400 aircraft because of inclement weather, lack of fuel and tools, and during transport to the front. The Soviet Air Force flew approximately 44,000 sorties during the war.

=== Finnish Air Force ===
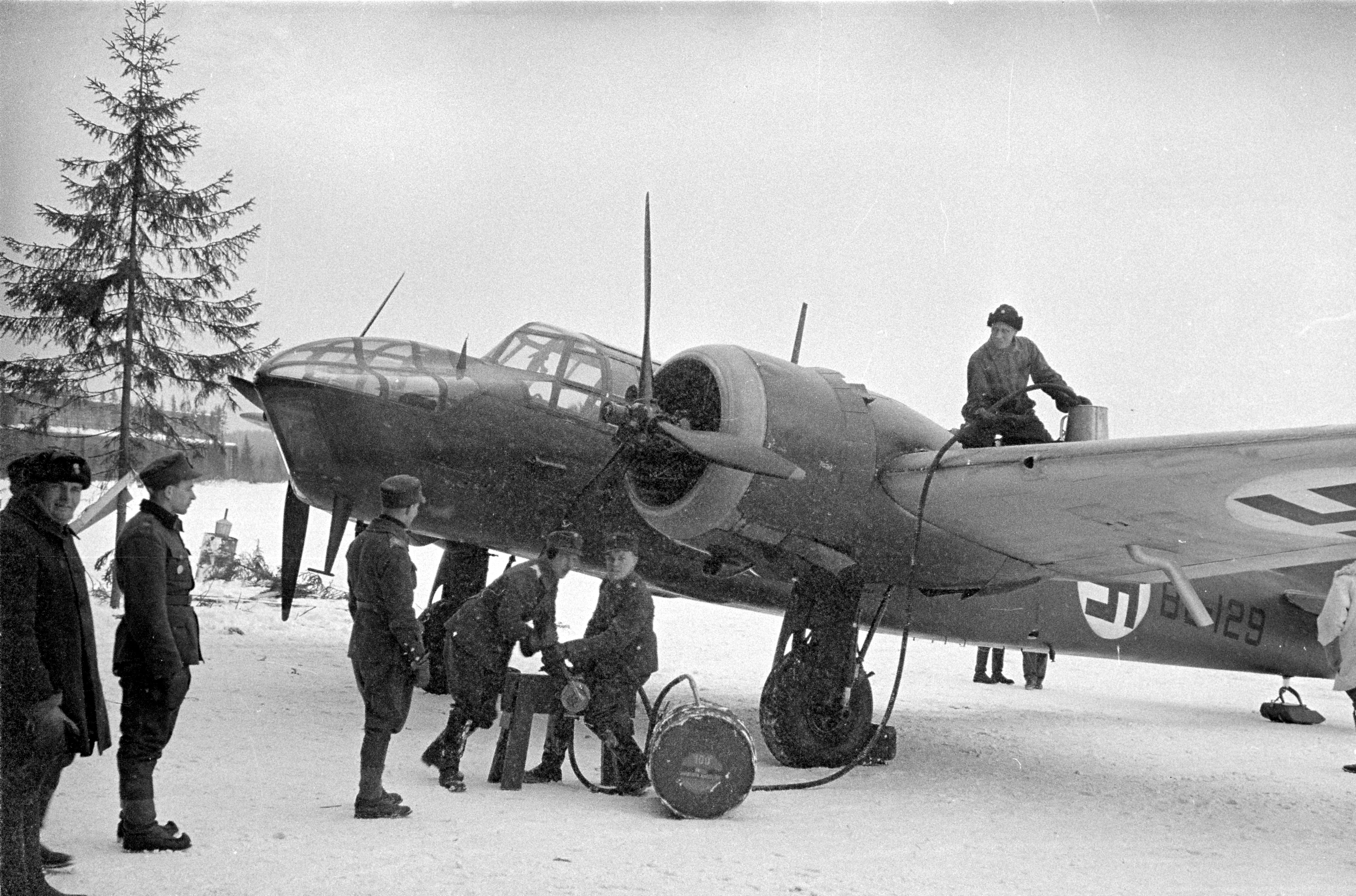
March 1940, a Finnish Bristol Blenheim Mk. IV bomber of the No. 44 Squadron refuelling at its air base on a frozen lake in Tikkakoski. On the fuselage is the swastika, which the Finnish Air Force had adopted as their symbol in 1918. Despite the similarity, it was not a Nazi design but was based on the personal owner; Eric von Rosen had donated the first aircraft to the Air Force.

At the beginning of the war, Finland had a small air force, with only 114 combat planes fit for duty. Missions were limited, and fighter aircraft were mainly used to repel Soviet bombers. Strategic bombings doubled as opportunities for military reconnaissance. Old-fashioned and few in number, aircraft offered little support for Finnish ground troops. In spite of losses, the number of planes in the Finnish Air Force rose by over 50 per cent by the end of the war. The Finns received shipments of British, French, Italian, Swedish and American aircraft.

Finnish fighter pilots often flew their motley collection of planes into Soviet formations that outnumbered them 10 or even 20 times. Finnish fighters shot down 200 Soviet aircraft, while losing 62 of their own on all causes. Finnish anti-aircraft guns downed more than 300 enemy aircraft. Often, a Finnish forward air base consisted of a frozen lake, a windsock, a telephone set and some tents. Air-raid warnings were given by Finnish women organised by the Lotta Svärd. The top-scoring fighter ace was Jorma Sarvanto, with 12.83 victories. He would increase his tally during the Continuation War.

== Naval warfare ==
=== Naval activity ===
There was little naval activity during the Winter War. The Baltic Sea began to freeze over by the end of December, impeding the movement of warships; by mid-winter, only icebreakers and submarines could still move. The other reason for low naval activity was the nature of Soviet Navy forces in the area. The Baltic Fleet was a coastal defence force which did not have the training, logistical structure, or landing craft to undertake large-scale operations. It possessed two battleships, one heavy cruiser, almost 20 destroyers, 50 motor torpedo boats, 52 submarines, and other miscellaneous vessels. The Soviets used naval bases in Paldiski, Tallinn, and Liepāja for their operations.

The Finnish Navy was a coastal defence force with two coastal defence ships, five submarines, four gunboats, seven motor torpedo boats, one minelayer, six minesweepers, and at least five icebreakers. The two coastal defence ships, Ilmarinen and Väinämöinen, were moved to harbour in Turku where they were used to bolster the air defence. Their anti-aircraft guns shot down one or two planes over the city, and the ships remained there for the rest of the war. At 18 January, Finnish armed icebreaker Tarmo was severely damaged at Kotka, received two bombs from a Soviet bomber with 39 Finnish troops killed in action. As well as coastal defence, the Finnish Navy protected the Ålandish and Finnish merchant vessels in the Baltic Sea.

Soviet aircraft bombed Finnish vessels and harbours and dropped mines into Finnish seaways. Still, only five merchant ships were lost to Soviet action. World War II, which had started before the Winter War, proved more costly for the Finnish merchant vessels, with 26 lost due to hostile action in 1939 and 1940.

=== Coastal artillery ===
Finnish coastal artillery batteries defended important harbours and naval bases. Most batteries were left over from the Imperial Russian period, with 152 mm (6.0 in) guns being the most numerous. Finland attempted to modernise its old guns and installed a number of new batteries, the largest of which featured a 305 mm (12.0 in) gun battery on the island of Kuivasaari in front of Helsinki, originally intended to block the Gulf of Finland to Soviet ships with the help of batteries on the Estonian side.

The first naval battle occurred in the Gulf of Finland on 1 December, near the island of Russarö, 5 km (3.1 mi) south of Hanko. That day, the weather was fair and visibility was excellent. The Finns spotted the Soviet cruiser Kirov and two destroyers. When the ships were at a range of 24 km (13 nmi; 15 mi), the Finns opened fire with four 234 mm (9.2 in) coastal guns. After five minutes of firing by the coastal guns, the cruiser had been damaged by near misses and retreated. The destroyers remained undamaged, but the Kirov suffered 17 dead and 30 wounded. The Soviets already knew the locations of the Finnish coastal batteries, but were surprised by their range.

Coastal artillery had a greater effect on land by reinforcing defence in conjunction with army artillery. Two sets of fortress artillery made significant contributions to the early battles on the Karelian Isthmus and in Ladoga Karelia. These were located at Kaarnajoki on the Eastern Isthmus and at Mantsi on the northeastern shore of Lake Ladoga. The fortress of Koivisto provided similar support from the southwestern coast of the Isthmus.

== Soviet breakthrough in February ==
=== Red Army reforms and offensive preparations ===
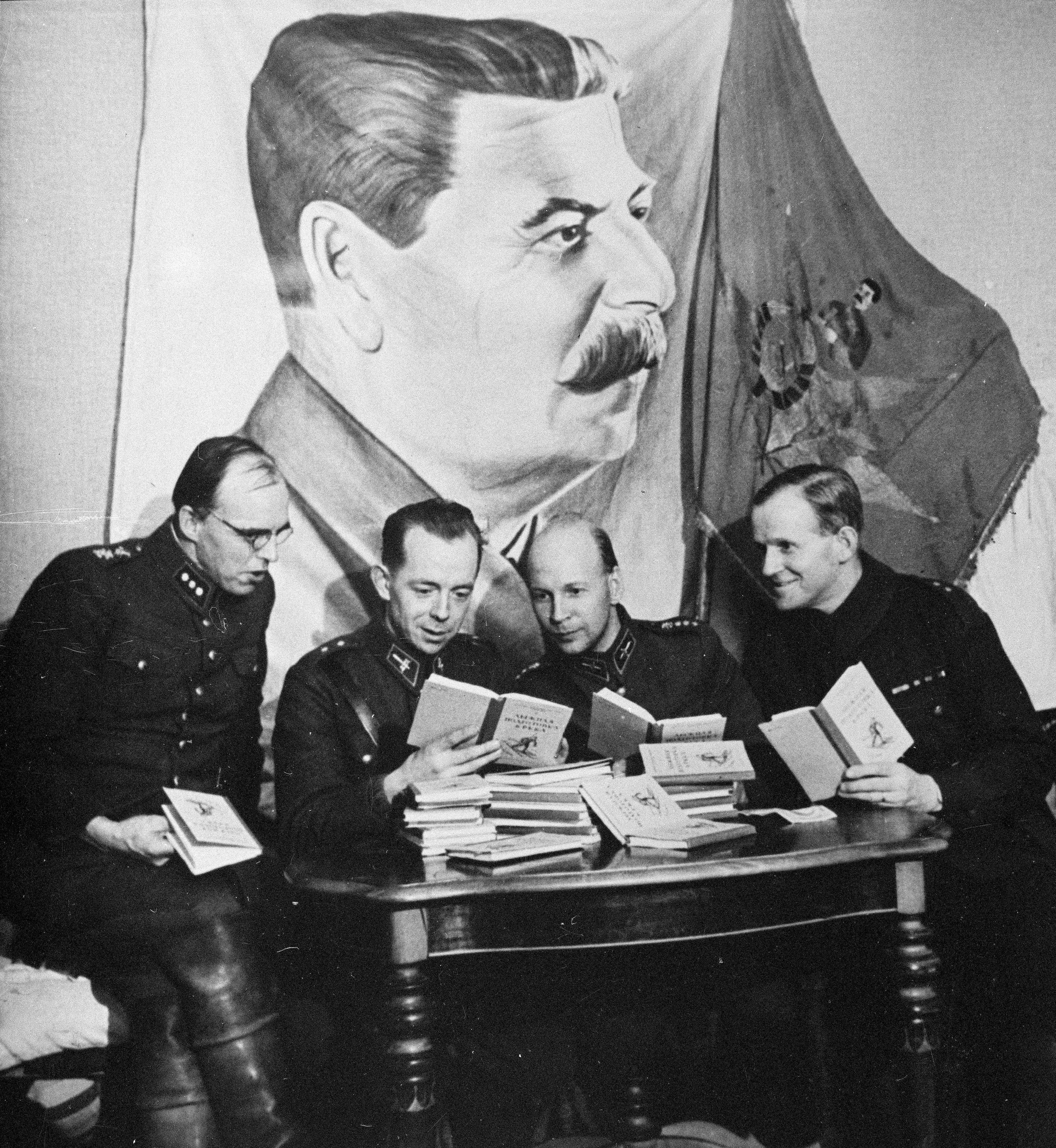
Finnish officers inspecting Soviet skiing manuals gained as loot from the Battle of Suomussalmi

Joseph Stalin was not pleased with the results of December 1939 in the Finnish campaign. The Red Army had been humiliated in defeats by smaller Finnish forces. By the third week of the war, Soviet propaganda was already working to explain the failures of the Soviet military to the populace: blaming bad terrain and harsh climate, and falsely claiming that the Mannerheim Line was stronger than the Maginot Line, and that the Americans had sent 1,000 of their best pilots to Finland. However, the Soviets were confronted with the unavoidable reality of the poor performance of their troops against the Finns. Stalin in particular was concerned about the effects of the war on Soviet reputation. In late December, the Soviets decided to reduce their strategic objectives and focused on bringing the war to an end.

Chief of Staff Boris Shaposhnikov was given full authority over operations in the Finnish theatre, and he ordered the suspension of frontal assaults in late December. Kliment Voroshilov was replaced with Semyon Timoshenko as the commander of the Soviet forces in the war on 7 January 1940. The main focus of the Soviet attack was switched to the Karelian Isthmus. Timoshenko and Zhdanov reorganised and tightened control between different branches of service in the Red Army. They also changed tactical doctrines to meet the realities of the situation.

The Soviet forces on the Karelian Isthmus were divided into two armies: the 7th and the 13th Army. The 7th Army, now under Kirill Meretskov, would concentrate 75 per cent of its strength against the 16 km (9.9 mi) stretch of the Mannerheim Line between Taipale and the Munasuo swamp. Tactics would be basic: an armoured wedge for the initial breakthrough, followed by the main infantry and vehicle assault force. The Red Army would prepare by pinpointing the Finnish frontline fortifications. The 123rd Rifle Division then rehearsed the assault on life-size mock-ups. The Soviets shipped large numbers of new tanks and artillery pieces to the theatre. Troops were increased from ten divisions to 25–26 divisions with six or seven tank brigades and several independent tank platoons as support, totalling 600,000 soldiers. On 1 February, the Red Army began a large offensive, firing 300,000 shells into the Finnish line in the first 24 hours of the bombardment.

=== Soviet offensive on the Karelian Isthmus ===
Although the Karelian Isthmus front was less active in January than in December, the Soviets increased bombardments, wearing down the defenders and softening their fortifications. During daylight hours, the Finns took shelter inside their fortifications from the bombardments and repaired damage during the night. The situation led quickly to war exhaustion among the Finns, who lost over 3,000 soldiers in trench warfare. The Soviets also made occasional small infantry assaults with one or two companies. Because of the shortage of ammunition, Finnish artillery emplacements were under orders to fire only against directly threatening ground attacks. On 1 February, the Soviets further escalated their artillery and air bombardments.

Even though the Soviets refined their tactics and morale improved, the generals were still willing to accept massive losses to reach their objectives. Soviet attacks were now being screened by smoke, heavy artillery, and armour support, but the infantry charged in the open and in dense formations. Unlike their tactics in December, Soviet tanks advanced in smaller numbers. The Finns could not easily eliminate tanks if infantry troops protected them. After 10 days of constant artillery barrage, the Soviets achieved a breakthrough on the Western Karelian Isthmus in the Second Battle of Summa.

By 11 February, the Soviets had approximately 460,000 soldiers, 3,350 artillery pieces, 3,000 tanks and 1,300 aircraft deployed on the Karelian Isthmus. The Red Army was constantly receiving new recruits after the breakthrough. Opposing them, the Finns had eight divisions, totalling about 150,000 soldiers. One by one, the defenders' strongholds crumbled under the Soviet attacks and the Finns were forced to retreat. On 15 February, Mannerheim authorised a general retreat of the II Corps to a fallback line of defence. On the eastern side of the isthmus, the Finns continued to resist Soviet assaults, achieving a stalemate in the Battle of Taipale.

=== Peace negotiations ===
While the Finns attempted to re-open negotiations with Moscow by every means during the war, the Soviets did not respond. In early January, Finnish communist Hella Wuolijoki contacted the Finnish Government. She offered to contact Moscow through the Soviet Union's ambassador to Sweden, Alexandra Kollontai. Tanner, Ryti, and Paasikivi accepted Wuolijoki's offer and granted her permission to meet with Kollontai in Stockholm, where she arrived on 10 January. Kollontai and Wuolijoki would meet almost every day for the next three weeks at Stockholm's Grand Hotel. A back channel to the Kremlin had been established. On 29 January, Molotov put an end to the puppet Terijoki Government and recognized the Ryti–Tanner government as the legal government of Finland, informing it that the Soviet Union was willing to negotiate peace.

By mid-February, it became clear that the Finnish forces were rapidly approaching exhaustion. For the Soviets, casualties were high, the situation was a source of political embarrassment to the Soviet regime, and there was a risk of Franco-British intervention (which was overestimated by Soviet intelligence in February and March 1940). With the spring thaw approaching, the Soviet forces risked becoming bogged down in the forests. Finnish Foreign Minister Väinö Tanner arrived in Stockholm on 12 February and negotiated the peace terms with the Soviets through the Swedes. German representatives, not aware that the negotiations were underway, suggested on 17 February that Finland negotiate with the Soviet Union.

Both Germany and Sweden were keen to see an end to the Winter War. The Germans feared losing the iron ore fields in Northern Sweden and threatened to attack at once if the Swedes granted the Allied forces right of passage. The German invasion plan, named Studie Nord, was later implemented as Operation Weserübung. Leon Trotsky opined after the war that Hitler would view a Soviet occupation of Finland as a threat to this plan. Any potential German plans for bases in Finland would also be thwarted if the Soviets occupied Finland, though Trotsky himself believed that Hitler was not interested in occupying Finland, but rather its role as a buffer between Germany and the Soviet Union.

As the Finnish Cabinet dithered in the face of harsh Soviet conditions, Sweden's King Gustaf V made a public statement on 19 February in which he confirmed having declined Finnish pleas for support from Swedish troops. On 25 February, the Soviet peace terms were spelt out in detail. On 29 February, the Finnish Government accepted the Soviet terms in principle and was willing to enter into negotiations. Red Army commanders wished to continue the war as their forces were starting to make progress against the Finns, whereas the Communist Party pointed out that the war was becoming too costly and called for the signing of a peace treaty. The party believed that Finland could be taken over later by means of a revolution. The heated discussion that ensued failed to yield any clear result and the matter went to a vote, in which the party's opinion prevailed and the decision was taken to bring hostilities to an end.

=== End of war in March ===
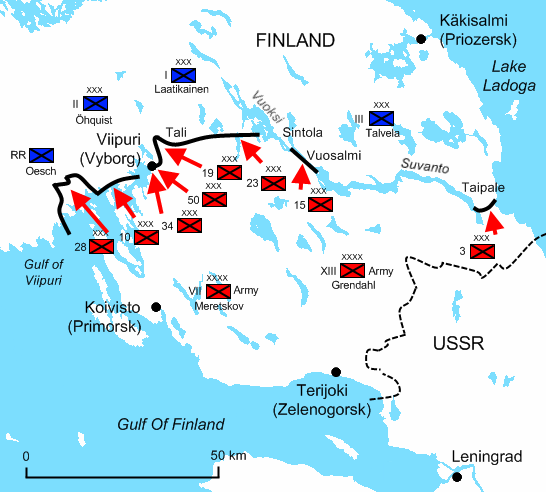
Situation on the Karelian Isthmus on 13 March 1940, the last day of the war Finnish corps (XXX) or Oesch's coast group Soviet corps (XXX) or army (XXXX)

On 5 March, the Red Army advanced 10 to 15 km (6.2 to 9.3 mi) past the Mannerheim Line and entered the suburbs of Viipuri. The same day, the Red Army established a beachhead on the Western Gulf of Viipuri. The Finns proposed an armistice on 6 March, but the Soviets, wanting to keep the pressure on the Finnish government, declined the offer. The Finnish peace delegation travelled to Moscow via Stockholm and arrived on 7 March. They were disappointed to find that Stalin was not present during peace negotiations, likely due to the Red Army's humiliation by the Finns. The Soviets had further demands, as their military position was strong and improving. On 9 March, the Finnish military situation on the Karelian Isthmus was dire, as troops were experiencing heavy casualties. Artillery ammunition was exhausted and weapons were wearing out. The Finnish government, realizing that the hoped-for Franco-British military expedition would not arrive in time, as Norway and Sweden had not given the Allies right of passage, had little choice but to accept the Soviet terms. Finnish President Kyösti Kallio resisted the idea of giving up any territory to the Soviet Union, but eventually agreed to sign the Moscow Peace Treaty. When he signed the document, the tormented president uttered the well-known words: "Let the hand wither that signs this monstrous treaty!" Ironically, his right arm was paralysed the following summer, and he was forced to switch his writing hand.

=== Moscow Peace Treaty ===
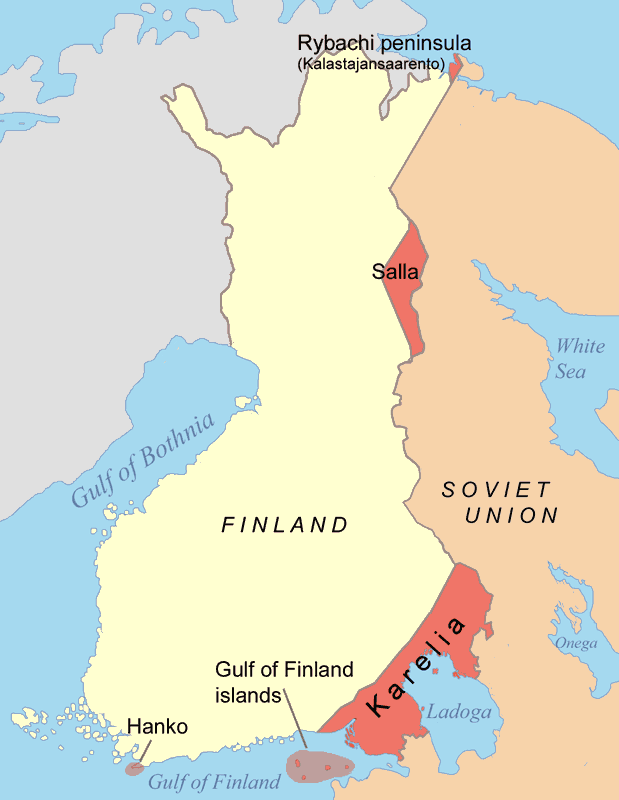
Finland's territorial concessions to the Soviet Union displayed in red

The Moscow Peace Treaty was signed in Moscow on 12 March 1940. A cease-fire took effect the next day at noon Leningrad time, 11 a.m. Helsinki time. With it, Finland ceded the Karelian Isthmus and most of Ladoga Karelia. The area included Viipuri (Finland's second-largest city [Population Register] or fourth-largest city [Church and Civil Register], depending on the census data), much of Finland's industrialised territory, and significant land still held by Finland's military – all in all, nine per cent of Finnish territory. The ceded territory included 13 per cent of Finland's economic assets. The news about the treaty was so significant at the time that even one of Finland's most devastating train accidents in Turenki that day remained unreported.

12 per cent of Finland's population, 422,000 to 450,000 Karelians, were evacuated and lost their homes. Finland also ceded a part of the region of Salla, the Rybachy Peninsula in the Barents Sea, and four islands in the Gulf of Finland. The Hanko peninsula was leased to the Soviet Union as a military base for 30 years. The region of Petsamo, captured by the Red Army during the war, was returned to Finland according to the treaty.

Finnish concessions and territorial losses exceeded Soviet pre-war demands. Before the war, the Soviet Union demanded for the frontier with Finland on the Karelian Isthmus to be moved westward to a point 30 kilometres (19 mi) east of Viipuri to the line between Koivisto and Lipola; for existing fortifications on the Karelian Isthmus to be demolished and for the islands of Suursaari, Tytärsaari, and Koivisto in the Gulf of Finland and Rybachy Peninsula to be ceded. In exchange, the Soviet Union proposed to cede Repola and Porajärvi from Eastern Karelia, an area twice as large as the territories that were originally demanded from the Finns.

== Foreign support ==
=== Foreign volunteers ===
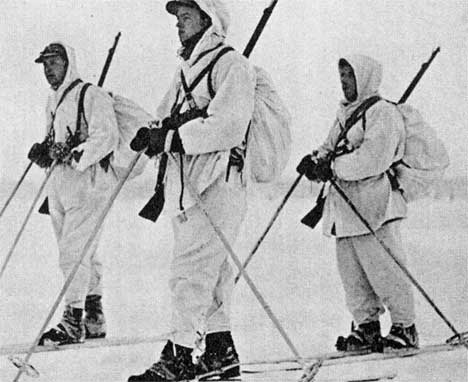
Norwegian volunteers somewhere in Northern Finland

World opinion largely supported the Finnish cause, and the Soviet aggression was generally deemed unjustified. World War II had not yet directly affected France, the United Kingdom or the United States; the Winter War was practically the only conflict in Europe at that time and thus held major world interest. Several foreign organisations sent material aid, and many countries granted credit and military materiel to Finland. Nazi Germany allowed arms to pass through its territory to Finland, but after a Swedish newspaper made this public, Adolf Hitler initiated a policy of silence towards Finland, as part of improved German–Soviet relations following the signing of the Molotov–Ribbentrop Pact.

The largest foreign contingent came from neighbouring Sweden, which provided nearly 8,760 volunteers during the war. The Volunteer Corps was formed of predominantly Swedes, as well as 1,010 Danes and 727 Norwegians. They fought on the northern front at Salla during the last days of the war. A Swedish unit of Gloster Gladiator fighters, named "the Flight Regiment 19" also participated. Swedish anti-air batteries with Bofors 40 mm (1.6 in) guns were responsible for air defence in northern Finland and the city of Turku. Volunteers arrived from Hungary, Italy and Estonia. 350 American nationals of Finnish background volunteered, and 210 volunteers of other nationalities arrived in Finland before the war ended. Max Manus, a Norwegian, fought in the Winter War before returning to Norway and later achieved fame as a resistance fighter during the German occupation of Norway. In total, Finland received 12,000 volunteers, 50 of whom died during the war. The British actor Christopher Lee volunteered in the war for two weeks, but did not face combat.

==== White émigrés and Russian prisoners-of-war ====
Finland officially refused overtures from the anti-Soviet Russian All-Military Union (ROVS) for aid. Nevertheless, Mannerheim eventually agreed to establish a small Russian detachment (Russkaya narodnaya armiya, RNA) of 200 men after being introduced to Boris Bazhanov, a high-ranking ROVS member, in person in January 1940. The project was deemed top secret, and was under the auspices of the intelligence division of the Finnish Army headquarters.

The ranks of RNA were to be filled by prisoners-of-war, but it would be commanded by White émigrés instead of captured Soviet Army officers, who were deemed unreliable. Bazhanov's Finnish assistant Feodor Schulgin chose Captain Vladimir Kiseleff, Lieutenant Vladimir Lugovskoy, Anatoly Budyansky and brothers Nikolay and Vladimir Bastamov as officers for the unit. Of the five, the Bastamovs were not Finnish citizens, but had Nansen passports. The prisoners-of-war were trained in Huittinen, although it is possible that some were also trained in Lempäälä.

RNA never participated in battle, despite Boris Bazhanov's later claims to the contrary in his memoirs. About 35 to 40 members of it were present during a battle in Ruskeala in early March 1940, where they spread flyers and broadcast propaganda to encircled Soviet troops, but did not carry weapons. The men were subsequently detained by Finnish forces, who mistook them for Soviet infiltrators. After the war's end, Bazhanov was immediately asked to leave Finland, which he did. Finnish military historian Carl Geust presumes that most members of the RNA were executed after they were returned to the Soviet Union after the war. Additionally, Vladimir Bastamov was later extradited into the Soviet Union as one of the Leino prisoners in 1945, and was sentenced to 20 years of hard labour. He was released after Stalin's death and returned to Finland in 1956.

=== Franco-British intervention plans ===
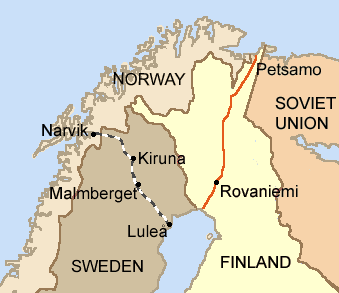
Franco-British support was offered on the condition their forces could pass freely from Narvik through neutral Norway and Sweden instead of the difficult passage through Soviet-occupied Petsamo.

France had been one of the earliest supporters of Finland during the Winter War. The French saw an opportunity to weaken Germany's resource imports via a Finnish counteroffensive, as both Sweden and the Soviet Union were strategic trading partners to Germany. France had another motive, preferring to have a major war in a remote part of Europe rather than on French soil. France planned to re‑arm the Polish exile units and transport them to the Finnish Arctic port of Petsamo. Another proposal was a massive air strike with Turkish co-operation against the Caucasus oil fields.

The British, for their part, wanted to block the flow of iron ore from Swedish mines to Germany as the Swedes supplied up to 40 per cent of Germany's iron demand. The matter was raised by British Admiral Reginald Plunkett on 18 September 1939, and the next day Winston Churchill brought up the subject in the Chamberlain War Cabinet. On 11 December, Churchill opined that the British should gain a foothold in Scandinavia with the objective to help the Finns, but without a war with the Soviet Union. Because of the heavy German reliance on Northern Sweden's iron ore, Hitler had made it clear to the Swedish government in December that any Allied troops on Swedish soil would immediately provoke a German invasion.

On 19 December, French Prime Minister Édouard Daladier introduced his plan to the General Staff and the War Cabinet. In his plan, Daladier created linkage between the war in Finland and the iron ore in Sweden. There was a danger of Finland's possible fall under Soviet hegemony. In turn, Nazi Germany could occupy both Norway and Sweden. These two powers could divide Scandinavia between them, as they had already done with Poland. The main motivation of the French and the British was to reduce German war-making ability.

The Military Co-ordination Committee met on 20 December in London, and two days later the French plan was put forward. The Anglo-French Supreme War Council elected to send notes to Norway and Sweden on 27 December, urging the Norwegians and Swedes to help Finland and offer the Allies their support. Norway and Sweden rejected the offer on 5 January 1940. The Allies came up with a new plan, in which they would demand that Norway and Sweden give them right of passage by citing a League of Nations resolution as justification. The expedition troops would disembark at the Norwegian port of Narvik and proceed by rail toward Finland, passing through the Swedish ore fields on the way. This demand was sent to Norway and Sweden on 6 January, but it was likewise rejected six days later.

Stymied but not yet dissuaded from the possibility of action, the Allies formulated a final plan on 29 January. First, the Finns would make a formal request for assistance. Then, the Allies would ask Norway and Sweden for permission to move the "volunteers" across their territory. Finally, to protect the supply line from German actions, the Allies would send units ashore at Namsos, Bergen, and Trondheim. The operation would have required 100,000 British and 35,000 French soldiers with naval and air support. The supply convoys would sail on 12 March and the landings would begin on 20 March. The end of the war on 13 March cancelled Franco-British plans to send troops to Finland through Northern Scandinavia.

== Aftermath and casualties ==
=== Result ===
The outcome of the Winter War is viewed differently among historians. Some view it as a Soviet victory and Finnish defeat. However, others view the war as a Soviet failure for failing to absorb Finland.

Historically, the Soviet invasion of Finland has been deemed one of the most embarrassing periods in Russian history and a severe failure, or a "less than convincing" victory, while also being considered a "botched campaign" and the outcome hurting Soviet prestige.

=== Finland ===
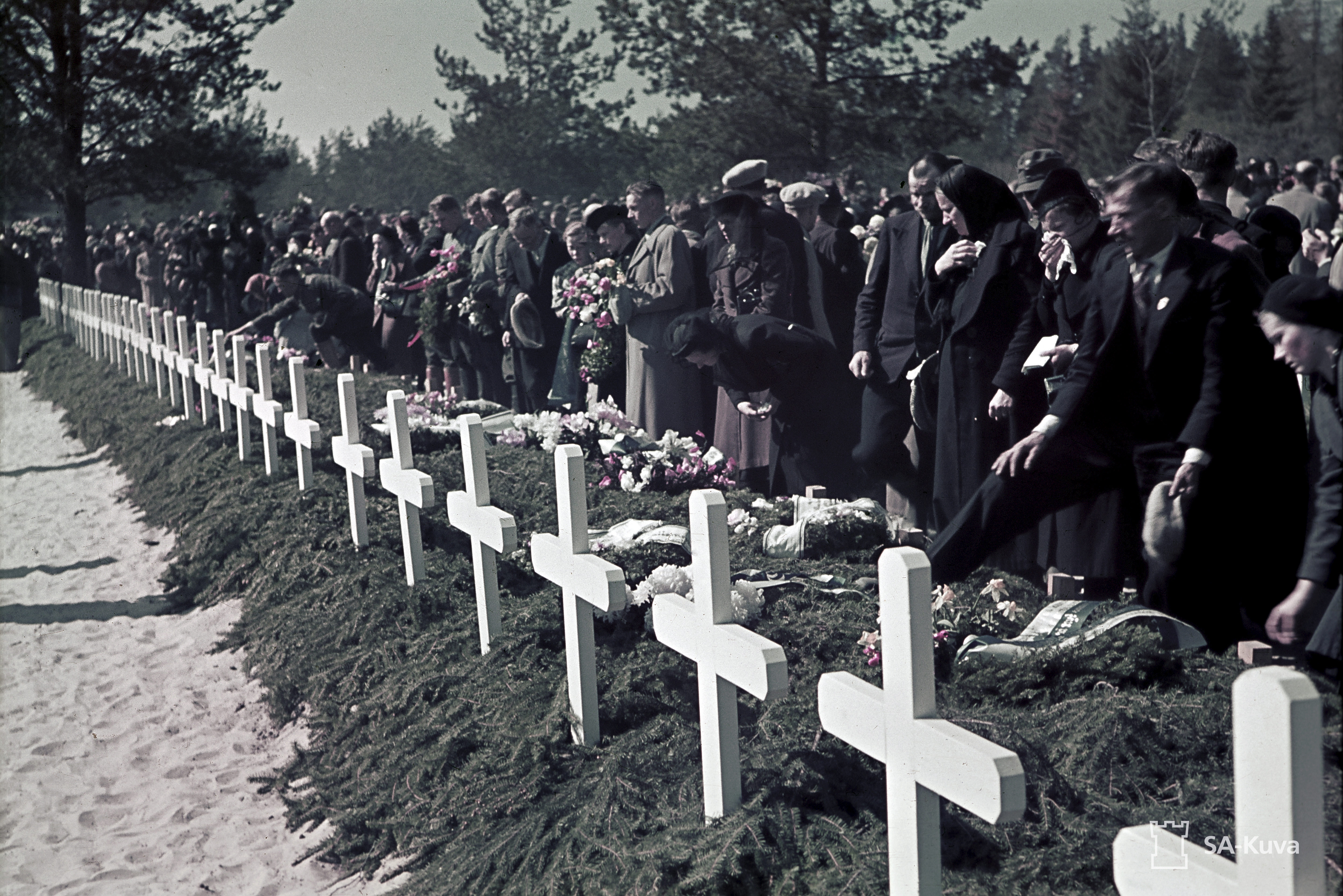
Heroes' Memorial Day in Joensuu 19 May 1940

The 105-day war had a profound and depressing effect in Finland. Meaningful international support was minimal and arrived late, and the German blockade had prevented most armament shipments. The 15-month period between the Winter War and Operation Barbarossa, part of which was the Continuation War, was later called the Interim Peace. After the end of the war, the situation of the Finnish Army on the Karelian Isthmus became a subject of debate in Finland. Orders had already been issued to prepare a retreat to the next line of defence in the Taipale sector. Estimates of how long the Red Army could have been delayed by retreat-and-stand operations varied from a few days to a few weeks, or to a couple of months at most.

Immediately after the war, Helsinki officially announced 19,576 dead. According to revised estimates in 2005 by Finnish historians, 25,904 people died or went missing and 43,557 were wounded on the Finnish side during the war. (Note: A detailed classification of dead and missing is as follows: Dead, buried 16,766; Wounded, died of wounds 3,089; Dead, not buried, later declared as dead 3,503; Missing, declared as dead 1,712; Died as a prisoner of war 20; Other reasons (diseases, accidents, suicides) 677; Unknown 137; Died during the additional refresher training (diseases, accidents, suicides) 34.) Finnish and Russian researchers have estimated that there were 800–1,100 Finnish prisoners of war, of whom between 10 and 20 per cent died. The Soviet Union repatriated 847 Finns after the war. Air raids killed 957 civilians. Between 20 and 30 tanks were destroyed and 62 aircraft were lost. Also, Finland had to cede all ships of the Finnish Ladoga Naval Detachment to the Soviet Union by virtue of the Moscow Peace Treaty.

During the interim peace, Finland aimed to improve its defensive capabilities and conducted negotiations with Sweden on a military alliance, but negotiations ended once it became clear that both Germany and the Soviet Union opposed such an alliance. On 31 July 1940, German Chancellor Adolf Hitler gave the order to plan an assault on the Soviet Union and so Germany had to reassess its position regarding Finland. Until then, Germany had rejected Finnish appeals to purchase arms. However, the prospect of an invasion of the Soviet Union reversed the policy. In August, the secret sale of weapons to Finland was permitted.

Karelian evacuees established an interest group, the Finnish Karelian League, to defend Karelian rights and interests and to find a way to return ceded regions of Karelia to Finland. Finland wished to re-enter the war mainly because of the Soviet invasion of Finland during the Winter War, which had taken place after Finland had failed by relying on the League of Nations and on Nordic neutrality. Finland aimed primarily to reverse its territorial losses from the Moscow Peace Treaty and, depending on the success of the German invasion of the Soviet Union, possibly to expand its borders, especially into East Karelia. Some right-wing groups, such as the Academic Karelia Society, supported a Greater Finland ideology. The Continuation War began in June 1941 and led to Finnish participation in the Siege of Leningrad as well as the Finnish occupation of East Karelia.

=== Soviet Union ===
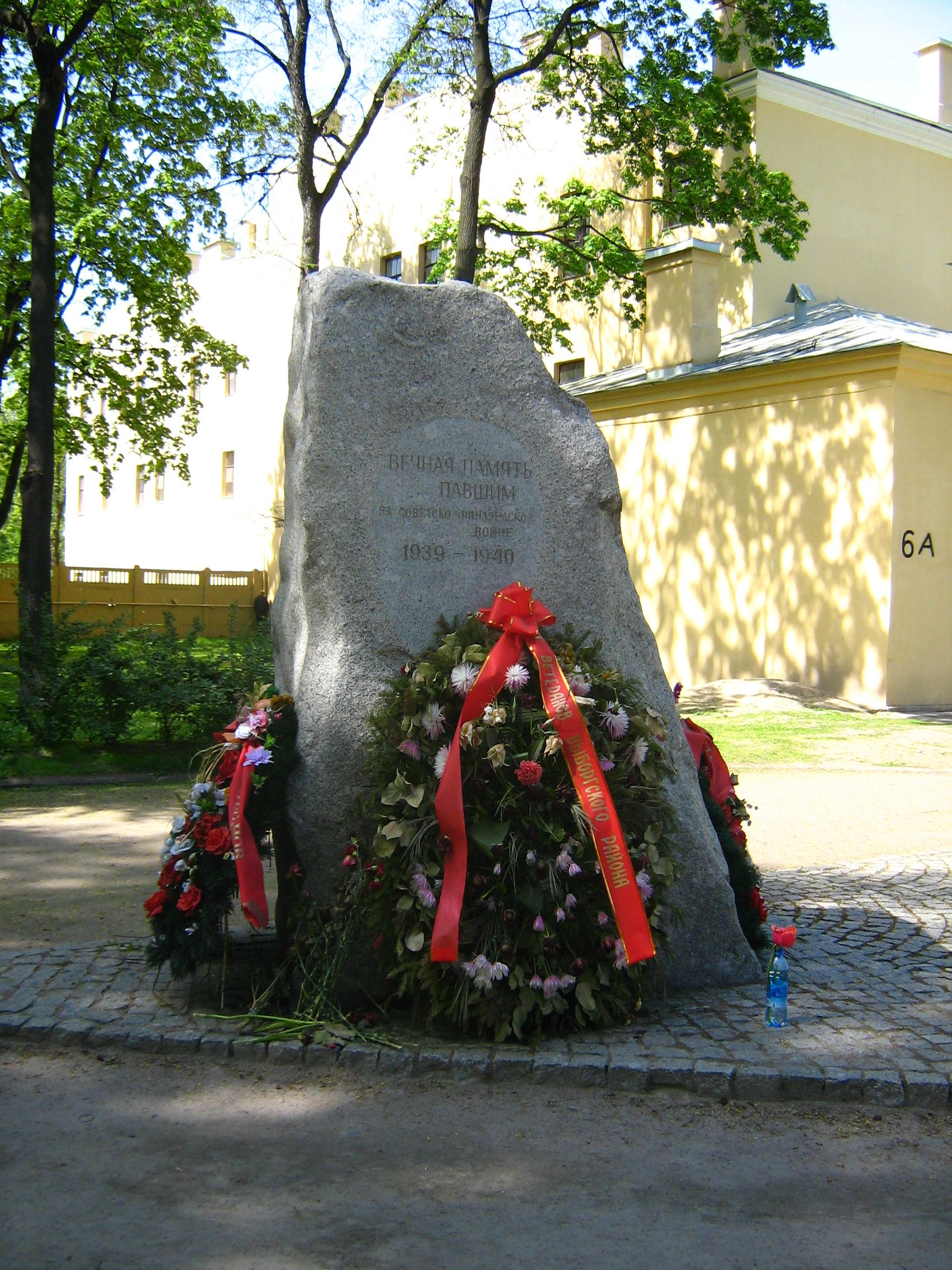
Monument devoted to the victims of the Winter War in St. Petersburg

The Soviet General Staff Supreme Command (Stavka) met in April 1940, reviewed the lessons of the Finnish campaign and recommended reforms. The role of frontline political commissars was reduced, and old-fashioned ranks and forms of discipline were reintroduced. Clothing, equipment and tactics for winter operations were improved. Not all of the reforms had been completed when the Germans initiated Operation Barbarossa 14 months later.

Between the Winter War and perestroika in the late 1980s, Soviet historiography relied solely on Molotov's speeches on the Winter War. In his radio speech of 29 November 1939, Molotov argued that the Soviet Union had tried to negotiate guarantees of security for Leningrad for two months. The Finns had taken a hostile stance to "please foreign imperialists". Finland had undertaken military provocation, and the Soviet Union could no longer abide by the non-aggression pacts. According to Molotov, the Soviet Union did not want to occupy or annex Finland, but the goal was purely to secure Leningrad.

The official Soviet figure, with reference to the command of the Leningrad Military District, was published at a session of the Supreme Soviet on 26 March 1940, with 48,475 dead and 158,863 sick and wounded. More recent Russian estimates vary: in 1990, Mikhail Semiryaga claimed 53,522 dead, and N. I. Baryshnikov, 53,500. In 1997, Grigoriy Krivosheyev claimed 126,875 dead and missing and total casualties of 391,783, with 188,671 wounded. In 1991, Yuri Kilin claimed 63,990 dead and total casualties of 271,528. In 2007, he revised the estimate of dead to 134,000 and in 2012, he updated the estimate to 138,533. In 2013, Pavel Petrov stated that the Russian State Military Archive has a database confirming 167,976 killed or missing along with the soldiers' names, dates of birth and ranks. Nikita Khrushchev stated in his memoirs that over one million Soviet soldiers were killed.

There were 5,572 Soviet prisoners of war in Finland. After the Winter War, the Soviet prisoners were returned to the USSR in accordance with the Moscow Peace Treaty. Of these, 450 were released, 4,354 were sentenced to imprisonment in labour camps ranging from 3 to 10 years and 414 were exposed to be "active in traitorous activities while in captivity", with 334 criminal cases being transferred to the Supreme Court of the Soviet Union; 232 of those cases ended in a death penalty.

Between 1,200 and 3,543 Soviet tanks were destroyed. The official figure was 611 tank casualties, but Yuri Kilin found a note received by the head of the Soviet General Staff, Boris Shaposhnikov, reporting 3,543 tank casualties and 316 tanks destroyed. According to Finnish historian Ohto Manninen, the 7th Soviet Army lost 1,244 tanks during the breakthrough battles of the Mannerheim Line in mid-winter. In the immediate aftermath of the war, the Finnish estimate of the number of lost Soviet tanks was 1,000 to 1,200. The Soviet Air Forces lost around 1,000 aircraft, but fewer than half of them were combat casualties. According to Carl Fredrik Geust, based on the studies of Soviet air force units, Finnish anti-aircraft units shot down 119 and Finnish fighter pilots 131 Soviet aircraft, though all Soviet aircraft losses had been more than 900.

=== Germany ===
The Winter War was a political success for the Germans. Both the Red Army and the League of Nations were humiliated, and the Anglo-French Supreme War Council had been revealed to be chaotic and powerless. The German policy of neutrality was unpopular in the homeland, and relations with Italy had suffered. After the Moscow Peace Treaty, Germany improved its ties with Finland, and within two weeks, Finnish-German relations were at the top of the agenda. More importantly, the very poor performance of the Red Army convinced Hitler that an invasion of the Soviet Union would be successful. In June 1941, Hitler declared, "we have only to kick in the door and the whole rotten structure will come crashing down".

=== Allies ===
The Winter War laid bare the disorganisation and ineffectiveness of the Red Army and that of the Allies. The Anglo-French Supreme War Council was unable to formulate a workable plan, revealing its unsuitability to make effective war in either Britain or France. This failure led to the collapse of the Third Daladier Government in France and the nomination of Paul Reynaud as the new Prime Minister of France.

== See also ==
- List of Finnish military equipment of World War II
- List of Soviet Union military equipment of World War II
- List of Finnish corps in the Winter War
- List of Finnish divisions in the Winter War
- Military history of Finland during World War II
- Winter War in popular culture

== General and cited references ==
=== English ===
- Ahtiainen, Ilkka (16 July 2000). "The Never-Ending Karelia Question". Helsinki Times. Archived from the original on 29 June 2011.
- Bullock, Alan (1993). Hitler and Stalin: Parallel Lives. Vintage Books. ISBN 978-0-679-72994-5.
- Chubaryan, A. (2002). "Foreword". In Kulkov, E.; Rzheshevskii, O.; Shukman, H. (eds.). Stalin and the Soviet-Finnish War, 1939–1940. Frank Cass. ISBN 978-0-7146-5203-0.
- Clemmesen, Michael H.; Faulkner, Marcus, eds. (2013). Northern European Overture to War, 1939–1941: From Memel to Barbarossa. Brill. ISBN 978-90-04-24908-0.
- Coates, William Peyton; Coates, Zelda Kahan (1940). Russia, Finland and the Baltic. London: Lawrence & Wishart.
- Conquest, Robert (2007) [1991]. The Great Terror: A Reassessment (40th Anniversary ed.). Oxford University Press, US. ISBN 978-0-19-531700-8.
- Coox, Alvin D. (1985). Nomonhan: Japan against Russia, 1939. Stanford University Press. ISBN 0-8047-1160-7.
- Dallin, David (1942). Soviet Russia's Foreign Policy, 1939–1942. Translated by Leon Dennen. Yale University Press.
- Edwards, Robert (2006). White Death: Russia's War on Finland 1939–40. Weidenfeld & Nicolson. ISBN 978-0-297-84630-7.
- Elliston, H.B. (1940). Finland Fights. London: G. Harrap.
- Engle, Eloise; Paananen, Lauri (1985) [1973]. The Winter War: The Russo-Finnish Conflict, 1939–40. Westview Press. ISBN 0-8133-0149-1.
- Fadiman, Clifton (1985). The Little, Brown book of anecdotes. Boston: Little, Brown. ISBN 978-0-316-08472-7. OCLC 759509883.
- Gadolin, Axel (1952). The Solution of the Karelian Refugee Problem in Finland. Dordrecht: Springer Netherlands. OCLC 9401179646. Reprint: ISBN 978-9401179645.
- Glanz, David (1998). Stumbling Colossus: The Red Army on the Eve of World War. University Press of Kansas. ISBN 978-0-7006-0879-9.
- Goldman, Stuart D. (2012). Nomonhan, 1939: The Red Army's Victory That Shaped World War II. Naval Institute Press. ISBN 978-1-59114-329-1.
- Hough, William J.H. (10 September 2019). "The Annexation of the Baltic States and Its Effect on the Development of Law Prohibiting Forcible Seizure of Territory". Nyls Journal of International and Comparative Law. 6 (2).
- Jowett, Philip; Snodgrass, Brent (2006). Finland at War 1939–45. Osprey. ISBN 978-1-84176-969-1.
- "Karjalan Liitto – Briefly in English". Finnish Karelian League. Archived from the original on 20 August 2009.
- Killham, Edward L. (1993). The Nordic Way: A Path to Baltic Equilibrium. Howells House.
- Kirby, David (2006). A Concise History of Finland. Cambridge University Press. ISBN 978-0-521-53989-0.
- Kokoshin, Andrei (1998). Soviet Strategic Thought, 1917-91. MIT Press.
- Kotkin, Stephen (2017). Stalin: Waiting for Hitler, 1929–1941. Penguin Press.
- Krivosheyev, Grigoriy (1997b). Soviet Casualties and Combat Losses in the Twentieth Century (1st ed.). Greenhill Books. ISBN 1-85367-280-7. Archived from the original on 18 January 2023.
- Laemlein, Tom (October 2013). "Where Will We Bury Them All?". American Rifleman. 161.
- Langdon-Davies, John (1941). Invasion in the Snow: A Study of Mechanized War. Houghton Mifflin Company. OCLC 1535780.
- League of Nations (14 December 1939). "Expulsion of the U.S.S.R.". League of Nations Official Journal.
- Lightbody, Bradley (2004). The Second World War: Ambitions to Nemesis. Routledge. ISBN 0-415-22404-7.
- Lunde, Henrik O. (2011). Finland's War of Choice: The Troubled German-Finnish Alliance in World War II. Newbury: Casemate Publishers. ISBN 978-1612000374.
- Murphy, David (2021). The Finnish-Soviet Winter War 1939–40: Stalin's Hollow Victory. Johnny Shumate. London: Bloomsbury Publishing Plc. ISBN 978-1-4728-4394-4. OCLC 1261364794.
- Nenye, Vesa; Munter, Peter; Wirtanen, Toni; Birks, Chris, eds. (2015). Finland at War: The Winter War 1939–1945. Osprey. ISBN 978-1-4728-2718-0.
- Reiter, Dan (2009). How Wars End (Illustrated ed.). Princeton University Press. ISBN 978-0691140605. Archived from the original on 19 April 2023.
- Ries, Tomas (1988). Cold Will: The Defense of Finland (1st ed.). Brassey's Defence Publishers. ISBN 0-08-033592-6.
- Rigby, Jonathan (2003). Christopher Lee: The Authorised Screen History. Reynolds & Hearn. ISBN 978-1903111642.
- Rutherford, Jeff (2014). Combat and Genocide on the Eastern Front: The German Infantry's War, 1941–1944. Cambridge University Press. p. 190. ISBN 978-1107055711. Archived from the original on 27 February 2018. "The ensnaring of Leningrad between the German and Finnish armies did not end the combat in the region as the Soviets launched repeated and desperate attempts to regain contact with the city."
- Sander, Gordon F. (2013). The Hundred Day Winter War: Finland's Gallant Stand against the Soviet Army. University Press of Kansas.
- Sedlar, Jean W. (2007). Hitler's Central European Empire 1938–1945. BookLocker. ISBN 978-1591139102.
- Tanner, Väinö (1957) [1950]. The Winter War: Finland Against Russia 1939–1940. Stanford University Press. Archived from the original on 19 April 2023. Reprint: ISBN 978-0-8047-0482-3.
- Tillotson, H. M. (1993). Finland at Peace & War 1918–1993. Michael Russell. ISBN 0-85955-196-2.
- Trotter, William R. (2002) [1991]. The Winter War: The Russo–Finnish War of 1939–40 (5th ed.). Aurum Press. ISBN 1-85410-881-6.
- Van Dyke, Carl (1997). The Soviet Invasion of Finland, 1939–40. Routledge. ISBN 0-7146-4314-9.
- Yarov, Sergey (2017). Leningrad 1941–42: Morality in a City Under Siege. Foreword by John Barber. John Wiley & Sons. p. 7. ISBN 978-1509508020. Archived from the original on 27 February 2018. "While the exact number who died during the siege by the German and Finnish armies from 8 September 1941 to 27 January 1944 will never be known, available data point to 900,000 civilian deaths, over half a million of whom died in the winter of 1941–2 alone."
- Yle News (15 March 2013). "Putin: Winter War aimed at correcting border 'mistakes'". Archived from the original on 14 December 2017.
- Iltasanomat (22 December 2019). "Yuri Kilin interview". Archived from the original on 30 November 2021.
- Zeiler, Thomas W.; DuBois, Daniel M., eds. (2012). A Companion to World War II. Wiley Blackwell Companions to World History. Vol. 11. Wiley-Blackwell. ISBN 978-1-4051-9681-9.

=== Finnish, Russian, and other languages ===
- Aptekar, Pavel. "Casus Belli: о Майнильском инциденте, послужившим поводом, для начала "Зимней войны" 1939–40 гг" [Casus Belli: about the Mainila incident, which served as a pretext for the beginning of the "Winter War" of 1939–40]. Raboche-Krest'yanskaya Krasnaya Armiya (website) (in Russian). Archived from the original on 2 December 2022.
- Baryshnikov, N.; Salomaa, E. (2005). Вовлечение Финляндии во Вторую Мировую войну [Finland's Entrance into World War II]. In Chernov, M. (ed.). Крестовый поход на Россию [Crusade Against Russia] (in Russian). Yauza. ISBN 5-87849-171-0. Archived from the original on 6 November 2008.
- Bichekhvost, Alexander Fedorovich (2012). "Репрессивная политика советского государства и судьбы военнопленных Красной армии участников советско-финской войны 1939-1940 годов" [The Repressive Policy of the Soviet State and the Fate of the Red Army Prisoners of War Participants in the Soviet-Finnish War 1939–1940]. Известия Саратовского Университета. Новая Серия. Серия История. Международные Отношения (in Russian). 12 (4): 99–108. Archived from the original on 8 July 2022.
- Elfvegren, Eero (1999). "Merisota talvisodassa" [Naval Warfare in the Winter War]. Talvisodan pikkujättiläinen (in Finnish).
- Engman, Max (2007). Raja – Karjalankannas 1918–1920 [Border – The Karelian Isthmus 1918–1920]. WSOY. ISBN 978-951-0-32765-4.
- Enkenberg, Ilkka (2020). Talvisota Väreissä (in Finnish). Readme.fi. ISBN 978-952-373-053-3.
- Geust, Carl-Fredrik; Uitto, Antero (2006). Mannerheim-linja: Talvisodan legenda [The Mannerheim Line: Legend of the Winter War] (in Finnish). Ajatus. ISBN 951-20-7042-1.
- Hallberg, Torsten, ed. (2006). Karelen: ett gränsland i Norden (in Swedish). Föreningen Norden. ISBN 978-9185276806.
- Halsti, Wolfgang Hallstén (1955). Talvisota 1939–1940 [The Winter War 1939–1940] (in Finnish). Otava.
- Jokipii, Mauno (1999). Финляндия на пути к войне: Исследование о военном сотрудничестве Германии и Финляндии в 1940–1941 гг [Birth of the Continuation War: Research of German–Finnish Military Collaboration 1940–1941] (in Russian). Petrozavodsk: Karelia. ISBN 5754507356.
- Juutilainen, Antti; Koskimaa, Matti (2005). "Maavoimien joukkojen perustaminen" [Establishing the Army Forces]. Jatkosodan pikkujättiläinen (in Finnish).
- Juutilainen, Antti (1999a). "Laatokan Karjalan taistelut" [Battles in Ladoga Karelia]. Talvisodan pikkujättiläinen (in Finnish).
- Juutilainen, Antti (1999b). "Talvisodan ulkomaalaiset vapaaehtoiset" [Foreign Volunteers in the Winter War]. Talvisodan pikkujättiläinen (in Finnish).
- Kantakoski, Pekka (1998). Punaiset panssarit: Puna-armeijan panssarijoukot 1918–1945 [Red Armour: The Red Army's Tank Forces, 1918–1945] (in Finnish). PS-Elso. ISBN 951-98057-0-2.
- Kauppinen, Kari (18 July 2017). "Sotasankari Simo Häyhän ennennäkemätön päiväkirja löytyi – "Tässä on minun syntilistani"". Iltalehti (in Finnish). Helsinki. Archived from the original on 12 June 2018.
- Kilin, Juri (2007a). "Leningradin sotilaspiirin rajakahakka". In Jokisipilä, Markku (ed.). Sodan totuudet. Yksi suomalainen vastaa 5,7 ryssää [Truths of War. One Finn equals 5.7 Russians] (in Finnish). Ajatus.
- Kilin, Juri (2007b). "Rajakahakan hidas jäiden lähtö". In Jokisipilä, Markku (ed.). Sodan totuudet. Yksi suomalainen vastaa 5,7 ryssää [Truths of War. One Finn equals 5.7 Russians] (in Finnish).
- Kilin, Juri; Raunio, Ari (2007). Talvisodan taisteluja [Winter War Battles] (in Finnish). Karttakeskus. ISBN 978-951-593-068-2.
- Kilin, Yuri (1999). "Puna-armeijan Stalinin tahdon toteuttajana" [The Red Army as an Executor of Stalin's Will]. Talvisodan pikkujättiläinen (in Finnish).
- Kilin, Yu. M. (2012). "Soviet–Finish War 1939–1940 and Red Army's Losses". Proceedings of Petrozavodsk State University. Social Sciences & Humanities. 5 (126): 21–24. ISSN 1998-5053. Archived from the original on 6 October 2022.
- Kinnunen, Annika (5 November 2019). "Sotamuistoja – Simo Häyhän kuvaus talvisodasta" (PDF) (Candidate thesis) (in Finnish). University of Oulu. p. 13. Archived (PDF) from the original on 30 June 2022.
- Kovalyov, E. (2006). "7: Зимняя война балтийских подводных лодок (1939–1940 гг.)" [Winter War and the Baltic Submarines (1939–1940)]. Короли подплава в море червонных валетов [Submarine Kings of the Knave of Hearts Sea] (in Russian). Tsentrpoligraf. ISBN 5-9524-2324-8. Archived from the original on 1 November 2022.
- Kulju, Mika (2007). Raatteen tie: Talvisodan pohjoinen sankaritarina [The Raate Road: Tale of Northern Heroism during the Winter War] (in Finnish). Ajatus. ISBN 978-951-20-7218-7.
- Kurenmaa, Pekka; Lentilä, Riitta (2005). "Sodan tappiot" [Casualties of the War]. Jatkosodan pikkujättiläinen (in Finnish).
- Laaksonen, Lasse (2005) [1999]. Todellisuus ja harhat [Reality and Illusions] (in Finnish). Ajatus. ISBN 951-20-6911-3.
- Laaksonen, Lasse (1999). "Kannaksen taistelut" [Battles in the Isthmus]. Talvisodan pikkujättiläinen (in Finnish).
- Lentilä, Riitta; Juutilainen, Antti (1999). "Talvisodan uhrit" [Victims of the Winter War]. Talvisodan pikkujättiläinen.
- Leskinen, Jari; Juutilainen, Antti (2005). Jatkosodan pikkujättiläinen [Continuation War Guidebook] (in Finnish) (1st ed.). WSOY. ISBN 951-0-28690-7.
- Leskinen, Jari (1999). "Suomen ja Viron salainen sotilaallinen yhteistyö Neuvostoliiton hyökkäyksen varalta 1930-luvulla" [The Clandestine Finnish-Estonian Military Collaboration against a Possible Soviet Invasion in the 1930s]. In Leskinen, Jari; Juutilainen, Antti (eds.). Talvisodan pikkujättiläinen (in Finnish).
- Leskinen, Jari; Juutilainen, Antti (1999). "Suomen kunnian päivät" [Glory Days of Finland]. Talvisodan pikkujättiläinen (in Finnish).
- Malmi, Timo (1999). "Suomalaiset sotavangit" [Finnish Prisoners of War]. Talvisodan pikkujättiläinen (in Finnish).
- Manninen, Ohto (2008). Miten Suomi valloitetaan: Puna-armeijan operaatiosuunnitelmat 1939–1944 [How to Conquer Finland: Operational Plans of the Red Army 1939–1944] (in Finnish). Edita. ISBN 978-951-37-5278-1.
- Manninen, Ohto (1999a). "Neuvostoliiton tavoitteet ennen talvisotaa ja sen aikana" [Soviet objectives before and during the Winter War]. Talvisodan pikkujättiläinen (in Finnish).
- Manninen, Ohto (1999b). "Venäläiset sotavangit ja tappiot" [Russian Prisoners of War and Casualties]. Talvisodan pikkujättiläinen (in Finnish).
- Manninen, Ohto (1994). Talvisodan salatut taustat (Hidden background of the Winter War) (in Finnish). Kirjaneuvos. ISBN 952-90-5251-0.
- Meltiukhov, Mikhail (2000). Упущенный шанс Сталина. Советский Союз и борьба за Европу [Stalin's Missed Chance] (in Russian). Veche. Archived from the original on 9 December 2020.
- Paasikivi, Juho Kusti (1958). Toimintani Moskovassa ja Suomessa 1939–41 [My Actions in Moscow and Finland 1939–1941] (in Finnish). WSOY.
- Palokangas, Markku (1999). "Suomalaisjoukkojen aseistus ja varustus" [Armament and Equipment of the Finnish Forces]. Talvisodan pikkujättiläinen (in Finnish).
- Paulaharju, Jyri (1999). "Pakkastalven kourissa" [In the Grip of Winter]. Talvisodan pikkujättiläinen (in Finnish).
- Paskhover, A. (3 June 2015). Красная Армия – самая миролюбивая, самая героическая... [Red Army – the most peaceful, the most heroic...]. Ukrayinska Pravda (in Russian). Archived from the original on 27 June 2022.
- Peltonen, Martti (1999). "Ilmasota talvisodassa" [Aerial Warfare in the Winter Wari]. Talvisodan pikkujättiläinen (in Finnish).
- Petrov, Pavel (2013). Venäläinen talvisotakirjallisuus: Bibliografia 1939–1945 [Russian Winter War Literature: Bibliography 1939–1945] (in Finnish). Docendo. ISBN 978-952-5912-97-5.
- Polvinen, Tuomo (1987) [1971]. Venäjän vallankumous ja Suomi 1917–1920 II: toukokuu 1918–joulukuu 1920 [Russian Revolution and Finland 1917–1920 II: May 1918 – December 1920]. WSOY. ISBN 951-0-14299-9.
- Shirokorad, A. (2001). "IX: Зимняя война 1939–1940 гг. [Winter War 1939–1940]". Северные войны России [Russia's Northern Wars] (in Russian). ACT. ISBN 5-17-009849-9. Archived from the original on 7 December 2019.
- Ravasz, István (2003). Finnország függetlenségi harca 1917–1945, Magyar önkéntesek Finnországban [Finland's struggle for independence from 1917 to 1945, Hungarian volunteers in Finland] (PDF) (in Hungarian). Wysocki Légió Hagyományőrző Egyesületnek. Archived from the original (PDF) on 20 October 2017.
- Rentola, Kimmo (2003). Holtsmark, Sven G.; Pharo, Helge Ø.; Tamnes, Rolf (eds.). Motstrøms: Olav Riste og norsk internasjonal historieskrivning [Counter Currents: Olav Riste and Norwegian international historiography.] (in Norwegian). Cappelen Akademisk Forlag. ISBN 8202218284.
- Russian State Military Archive. Российский государственный военный архив (РГВА) [Russian State Military Archive] (in Russian).
- Silvast, Pekka (1999). "Merivoimien ensimmäinen voitto: Russarö" [The Navy's First Victory: Russarö]. Talvisodan pikkujättiläinen (in Finnish).
- Soikkanen, Timo (1999). "Talvisodan henki" [The Spirit of the Winter War]. Talvisodan pikkujättiläinen (in Finnish).
- Statistics Finland (1941). Suomenmaan Tilastollinen Vuosikirja 1940 [Finnish Statistics Yearbook 1940] (PDF) (in Finnish). pp. 14–15. Archived (PDF) from the original on 7 March 2022.
- Turtola, Martti (1999a). "Kansainvälinen kehitys Euroopassa ja Suomessa 1930-luvulla" [International Developments in Europe and Finland in the 1930s]. Talvisodan pikkujättiläinen (in Finnish).
- Turtola, Martti (1999b). "Katkera rauha ja Suomen ulkopoliittinen asema sodan jälkeen" [Bitter Peace and the Post-War Position of Finnish Foreign Policy]. Talvisodan pikkujättiläinen (in Finnish).
- Vihavainen, Timo (1999). "Talvisota neuvostohistoriakirjoituksessa" [The Winter War in Soviet historiography]. Talvisodan pikkujättiläinen (in Finnish).
- Sokolov, Boris (2000). "Путь к миру" [Secrets of the Russo-Finnish War]. Тайны финской войны (in Russian). Вече. ISBN 5-7838-0583-1.
- Vuorenmaa, Anssi; Juutilainen, Antti (1999). "Myytti Mannerheim-linjasta". Talvisodan pikkujättiläinen (in Finnish). (Myth of the Mannerheim Line)
