= Yuri Kilin =

Russian historian

Yuri Mihailovich Kilin (Russian: Юрий Михайлович Килин, born 1961) is a Russian historian and a professor of History Studies at the Petrozavodsk State University in Petrozavodsk. He has written extensively on Russo-Finnish and Karelian historical conflicts. Kilin graduated with honours in 1983. He received his Candidate of Sciences degree in Leningrad 1991, and Doctor of Sciences degree in Moscow 2000. Kilin has written in over 50 publications, including over 25 published aboard. His name has also transliterated as Juri Kilin.

== Publications ==
=== in Russian publications ===
- Взгляд из Карелии на "зимнюю войну" // Международная жизнь. 1994. No. 3. С. 46–50.
- Западная помощь Финляндии в ходе зимней войны в отечественной и зарубежной литературе (Планы и реальные результаты) // Политическая история и историография (От античности до современности). Сб. науч. ст. Петрозаводск. 1994. С. 123–128.
- ББК как фактор военной стратегии // Север. 1995. No. 7. С. 101–118.
- Оптимизм. На что надеялись финны в 1939 году? // Родина. 1995. No. 12. С. 49–52.
- Восточная Карелия в военных планах командования финляндской армии в 1930-е годы // Национальная государственность финно-угорских народов северо-западной России (1917-1940-е годы). Сыктывкар, 1996. С. 40–44.
- Карельский вопрос в Финляндии и СССР (1920-е годы) // Север. 1997. No. 7. С. 115–123.
- Военно-политические аспекты советско-финляндских отношений в 1920-30-е годы // Россия и Финляндия в XX веке. Санкт-Петербург, 1997. C. 82–95.
- Карельское восстание 1921-1922 гг. и его последствия в свете новых архивных данных // Россия и Финляндия в XVIII-XX вв. Специфика границы. Санкт-Петербург, 1999. С. 88–102. 0,8 п.л.
- Гражданская война в России и рождение Карельской автономии // Финно-угроведение. (Материалы VI мирового конгресса по изучению Центральной и Восточной Европы.) 2001. No.1. С.30-39. (Статья, 1 п.л., г. Йошкар-Ола).
- Рождение карельской автономии // Studia Slavica Finlandensia. Tomus XIX. Helsinki, 2002. S. 88 - 117. 1,5 п.л.

=== in Finnish publications ===
- Rajaseudun väki kahdesti panttina 1939-1940 // Historiallinen aikakauskirja. 1993. No. 3. S.204-212.
- Karjalais-suomalainen Sosialistinen Neuvostotasavalta // Kahden Karjalan välillä. Kahden Riikin riitamaalla. Studia Carelica Humanistica 5. Tampere 1994. S.195-201.
- Neuvosto-Karjala 1920- ja 1930-luvuilla: strategia ja sotilaallinen rakennustyö // Kansallisuus ja valtio. Karjala ja Komi Neuvostoliiton tasavaltoina 1920- ja 1930-luvuilla. Joensuun yliopisto. Karjalan tutkimuslaitoksen monisteita. 1995. No. 5. S.77-90.
- Toinen marssi Ouluun. Puna-armeijan johdon toisen hyökkäyksen suunnitelmia Suomussalmen kautta maaliskuun loppupuoliskolla // Rajamailla III. 1996. Rovaniemi, 1997. S.83-90.
- Sotilaallisesta vaarattomuudesta ainoaksi viholliseksi: Leningradin sotilaspiirin valmistautuminen Suomen talvisotaan // Sotilasaikakauslehti. 1997. No. 2. S.21-27.
- Toinen riemumarssi Ouluun: puna-armeija valmistautui katkaisemaan Suomen vielä maaliskuussa 1940 // Sotilasaikakauslehti. 1997. No. 3. S.26-32.
- Heikkoudesta kovaksi nyrkiksi: Leningradin sotilaspiirin kehitysyritykset välirauhan aikana // Sotilasaikakauslehti. 1997. No. 5. S.59-62.
- Leningradin sotilaspiiri valmistautui suursotaan // Sotilasaikakauslehti. 1997. No. 6. S.61-64.
- Karjalan nousu uusien arkistolahteiden valossa // Rajamailla IV. 1997. Rovaniemi, 1998. S.41-50.
- Karjalan toinen suomalaistamisaika 1940-41 // Kultalahteen kahta puolta. Jyvaskylauml;, 1999. S.80-107.
- Kilin, Juri (1999). "Puna-armeijan Stalinin tahdon toteuttajana". In Leskinen, Jari; Juutilainen, Antti (eds.). Talvisodan pikkujättiläinen. pp. 356–384.
- Kilin, Juri; Raunio, Ari (2007). Talvisodan taisteluja (in Finnish). Karttakeskus. ISBN 978-951-593-068-2.

=== in Estonian publications ===
- Punaarmee Stalinin tahte elluviijana (Красная армия как исполнитель воли Сталина) // Talvesoda. (Энциклопедия зимней войны на эстонском языке) Tallinn, 2002. S. 337–362. 2,7 п.л.
