= Battle of Kollaa =

Battle of the Winter War

- Part of the Winter War
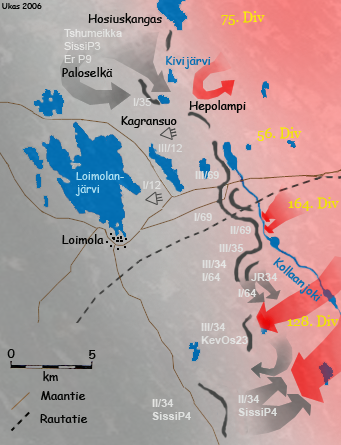
Date	December 7, 1939 – March 13, 1940
Location	Kollaa River, Finland 62°01′40″N 32°15′20″E
Result	Finnish victory

Belligerents
Finland	Soviet Union

Commanders and leaders
Woldemar Hägglund; Division: Lauri Tiainen (Until 31 January); Antero Svensson (From 1 February)	Ivan Khabarov (Until 13 December); Grigori Shtern (From 13 December); 56th Division: (December); M.S. Yevstigneyev; Corps: (February–March); 1st: Dmitri Kozlov; 14th : V.G. Vorontsov

Units involved
12th Division	In December; 56th Rifle Division; In March; 1st Rifle Corp; 14th Rifle Corp (6 divisions)

Casualties and losses
1,500 dead or wounded (estimate)	8,000 dead or wounded
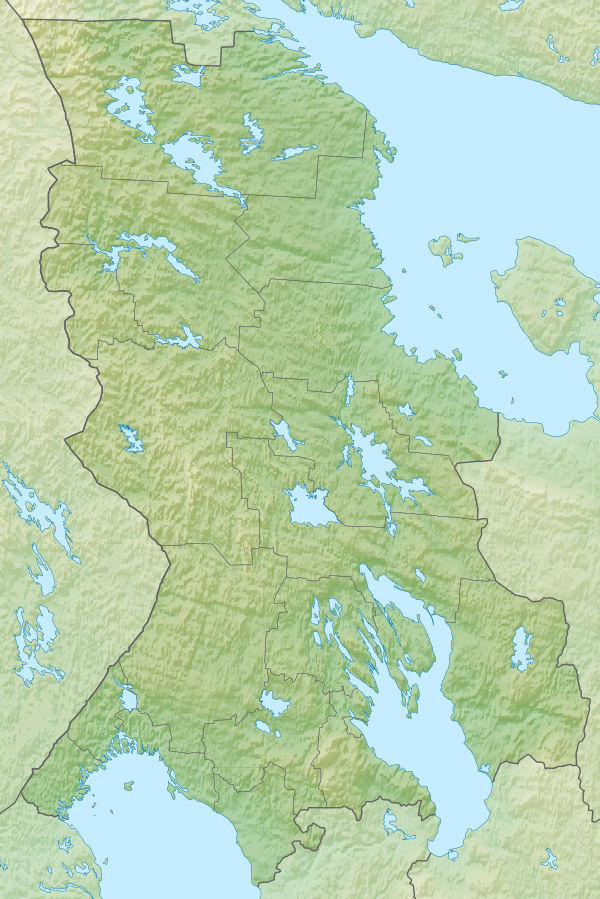
- Location within Karelia Battle of Kollaa (Finland)

The Battle of Kollaa was fought from 7 December 1939 to 13 March 1940 in Ladoga Karelia, Finland, as a part of the Soviet-Finnish Winter War.

== Description and outcome ==
After a string of defeats incurred by the 26th Finnish regiment, the 24th regiment entrenched themselves west of the Kollaa River. The Soviet thrust against this sector was largely unexpected, and opened grave possibilities of Red forces outflanking the Finnish line of defence north of Lake Ladoga and bypassing the Mannerheim Line. Hence, large portions of the Finnish Fourth Corps were diverted to the attack. Despite still having far fewer troops than the Soviets, the Finnish forces (12th Division) repelled the Red Army because the Soviets were only prepared to proceed along roads. With few roads in the Kollaa area, and all of them guarded by Finnish troops, the Soviets were unable to proceed cross-country without skis.

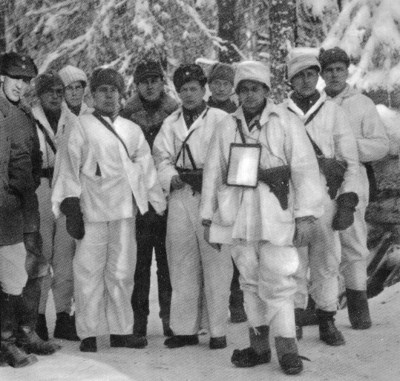
Finnish military leaders of the battle of Kollaa.

Kollaa is considered to have been one of the most difficult locations to defend during the Winter War. The creek-sized Kollaa River was surrounded by soil so cold in the winter months that the ground was nearly impossible to dig in.

After the Soviets captured Suojärvi on 2 December, Mannerheim relieved Juho Heiskanen and gave command of the IV Army Corps to Johan Hägglund. The Soviet 8th Army attempted to breakthrough Finnish lines in the Kollaanjoki River area. According to Chew, "The region between Lake Lagoda and the Kollaa road, where the two divisions of General Hägglund's IV Army Corps faced the ever-growing might of the 8th Amy, was the only major front to witness continuous heavy fighting throughout the month of January." On 6 January, the Finnish 12th and 13th Divisions advanced from Lake Syskyjärvi into the Soviet rear. Only four Finnish battalions defended Kollaa against the Soviet 56th and 164th Divisions. By 8 January, the Soviet 18th Division and the 34th Tank Brigade were cut off. By 11 January, the supply route to the Soviet 168th Division was also cut off. On 16 January, a company of NKVD border guards were also encircled. According to Chew, "Finnish attempts to destroy these encircled units resulted in the most extensive and bitterly fought motti warfare of the war." On 20 January, a Finnish force cut the Uomaa-Käsnäselkä road, blocking a counterattack by the Soviet 60th Division. On 18 February, the end came for the 18th Division, and 29 February the same fate came to the 34th Tank Brigade. The Soviets added the 24th Motorized Cavalry and the 128th Infantry to the 56th and 164th Divisions in the Kolaa sector, and launched an attack on 2 March. This battle was still ongoing when the ceasefire ensued.

One defence point, called "Killer Hill" by the Finns, saw the Soviets advance an entire regiment against a force of 32 fortified Finns. Four-hundred Soviets died, along with 28 of the defenders.

The Battle of Kollaa continued until the end of the Winter War, despite the Finnish 12th Division stopping the 8th Red Army and both sides suffering heavy losses. The Red Army managed to penetrate the Finnish defence line in Kollaa several times, pushing the Finns out of their positions. The Finns restored the integrity of their defence line through systematic counter-attacks. On 12 March, near the end of the war, the Soviets managed to form a 0.5–1.5 kilometres (0.31–0.93 mi) deep fracture point in the Finnish defence line, nearly resulting in its collapse. As a result, the commander of the Finnish Army's 12th Division considered abandoning the main defence line at Kollaa. However, as the news from the sector was that the situation was "not yet that alarming", the commander ordered a counter-attack, for the defence line to be retaken the following day. These orders were rescinded, as news of the concluded peace treaty reached the front, and the men were ordered to hold their current positions until the end of hostilities.

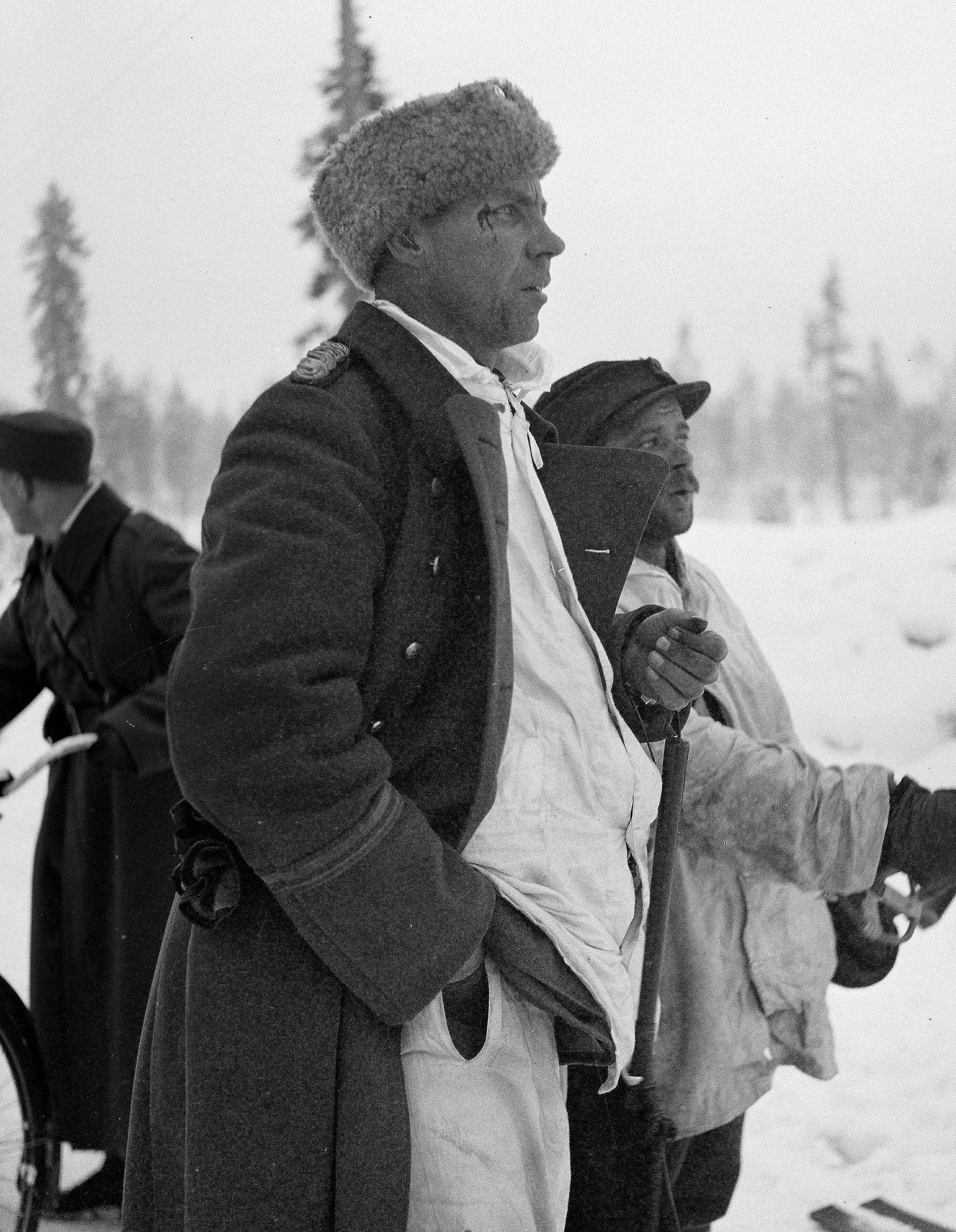
Captain Juutilainen at the front at Kollaa.

== New expression of Finnish resolve ==
A famous quote from the Battle of Kollaa is Major General Hägglund's question, "Will Kollaa hold? (Kestääkö Kollaa?)", to which Lieutenant Aarne Juutilainen replied, "Kollaa will hold (Kollaa kestää), unless the orders are to run away." The simple question and reply have entered the Finnish lexicon as an expression of perseverance and resolve in the face of impending difficulty or crisis. The Finnish punk band Kollaa Kestää uses the name.

== The "White Death" ==
The legendary Finnish sniper Simo Häyhä, nicknamed the "White Death", would see his first battle on the Kollaa front. He is credited with at least 505 confirmed kills during the war, according to Finnish military records.

== See also ==
- List of Finnish military equipment of World War II
- List of Soviet Union military equipment of World War II
