= Tiainen =

Tiainen is a Finnish surname Tiainen also means a bird, Tit, in Finnish. Notable people with the surname include:

- Lauri Tiainen (1891–1958), Finnish Colonel during World War II
- Arto Tiainen (1930–1998), Finnish cross-country skier
- Petri Tiainen (born 1966), Finnish football attacking midfielder
- Kari Tiainen (born 1966), Finnish enduro rider
- Juha Tiainen (1955–2003), Finnish hammer thrower
- Pertti Tiainen (born 1954), Finnish long-distance runner
