= IV Corps (Finland, Winter War) =

Corps of the Finnish Army during the Winter War

The IV Corps was an army corps formation of the Finnish Army during the Winter War against the Soviet Union. It defended the area north of Lake Ladoga against Soviet attacks. It was commanded by Major General Juho Heiskanen and from 4 December 1939 by Major General Woldemar Hägglund. The IV Corps defeated superior Soviet troops by using motti tactics.

== Order of battle ==
=== IV Corps ===
- 12th Division (12.D) led by Lauri Tiainen
- 13th Division (13.D) led by Hannu Hannuksela
- Separate Battalion 8 (Er.P.8)
- Separate Battalion 9 (Er.P.9)
- Separate Bicycle Company 4 (Er.PPK 4)

=== Group Talvela ===
Also attached to the corps was Group Talvela commanded by Commander Paavo Talvela. Group Talvela covered the IV Corps northern flank up to the forces of the North Karelian Group. Group Talvela defeated a Soviet Division in the Battle of Tolvajärvi, one of the first Finnish victories of the war. Group Talvelas order of battle:

- Infantry Regiment 16 (JR 16)
- One battalion of the replacement brigade (XII/KT-Pr)
- Separate Battalion 11 (Er.P.11)
- Separate Battalion 112 (Er.P.112)
- Bicycle Battalion 7 (PPP 7)
- two artillery batteries (9.Ptri/KTR 13 and 5.Ptri/KTR 12)

== Commanders ==
- Major General Juho Heiskanen (30.11.1939 - 04.12.1939),
- Major General Woldemar Hägglund (04.12.1939 - 13.03.1940).
