= Simo Häyhä =

Finnish military sniper (1905–2002)

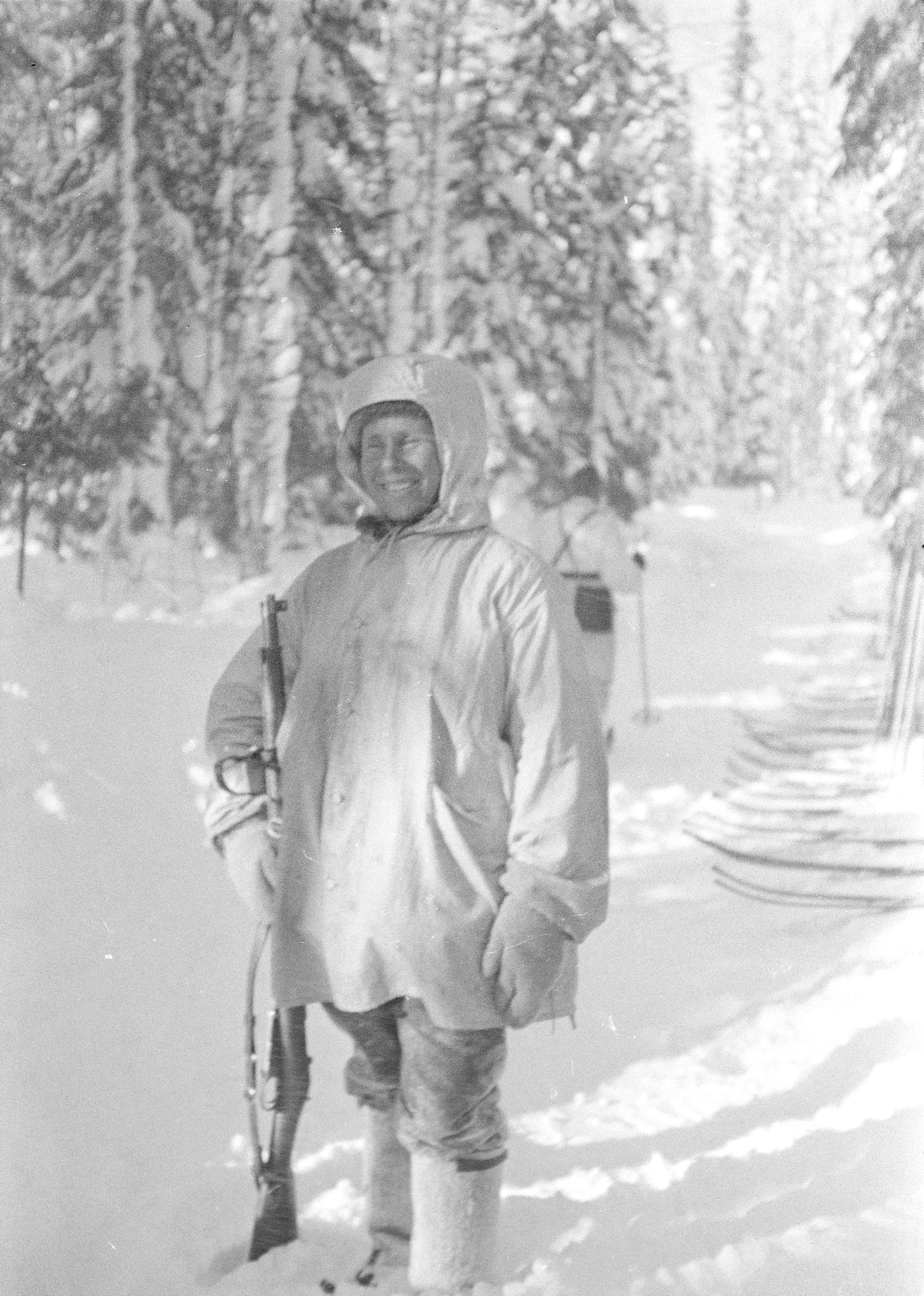
- Häyhä after being awarded the honorary rifle, model 28, on 17 February 1940
- Born: 17 December 1905; Rautjärvi, Viipuri Province, Grand Duchy of Finland, Russian Empire
- Died: 1 April 2002 (aged 96); Hamina, Finland
- Burial place: Ruokolahti Church graveyard 61.284678°N 28.829907°E
- Military career
- Allegiance: Finland
- Branch: Finnish Army
- Service years: 1925–1926, 1939–1940
- Rank: Alikersantti (Corporal) during the Winter War; Vänrikki (Second Lieutenant), promoted to shortly afterwards
- Nicknames: "Simuna" (personal); "The White Death" (military); "The Magic Shooter" (military)
- Unit: 6th Company of Infantry Regiment 34
- Conflict: World War II; Winter War; Battle of Kollaa (WIA)
- Awards: Medal of Liberty: 1st and 2nd class; Cross of Liberty: 3rd and 4th class; Cross of Kollaa: Silver version

Simo Häyhä (Note: Finnish pronunciation: [ˈsimo ˈhæy̯hæ]) (17 December 1905 – 1 April 2002), often referred to by his nickname The White Death, (Note: Finnish: Valkoinen kuolema; Russian: Бе́лая смерть, romanized: Bélaya smert’) was a Finnish military sniper during the Winter War between Finland and the Soviet Union in World War II. He used a Finnish-produced M/28-30 rifle (a variant of the Mosin–Nagant) and a Suomi KP/-31 submachine gun. Häyhä is believed to have killed more than 500 enemy soldiers during the conflict, the highest number of sniper kills in any major war. Consequently, he is generally regarded as the deadliest sniper in history.

Häyhä estimated in his private war memoir that he shot around 500 Soviet soldiers. Written in 1940, a few months after he was wounded, his Sotamuistoja (lit. 'War Memories') recounts his experiences before and during the Winter War, from 13 November 1939 to 13 March 1940. Hidden for decades, the memoir was discovered in 2017.

After his death, sudden historical events—such as Russia's invasion of Ukraine and Finland's subsequent NATO membership—have increased interest in Häyhä. Over the years, Häyhä's cult reputation has grown not only among those interested in military history but also among various subcultures; Häyhä has found his way into the lyrics of metal bands and into Japanese manga comics.

== Early life, family and education ==
Simo Häyhä was born on 17 December 1905 in the Kiiskinen hamlet of the Rautjärvi municipality in the Viipuri Province of southern Finland. He was the seventh of eight children in a Lutheran family of farmers. His father, Juho Häyhä, was the owner of the Mattila farm, while his mother, Katriina (née Vilkko), was a loving and hard-working farmer's wife. He attended school in the village of Miettilä in Rautjärvi and helped cultivate the home farm alongside his eldest brother. Before his military service, he was a farmer and enjoyed hunting and skiing.

=== Militia and military training ===
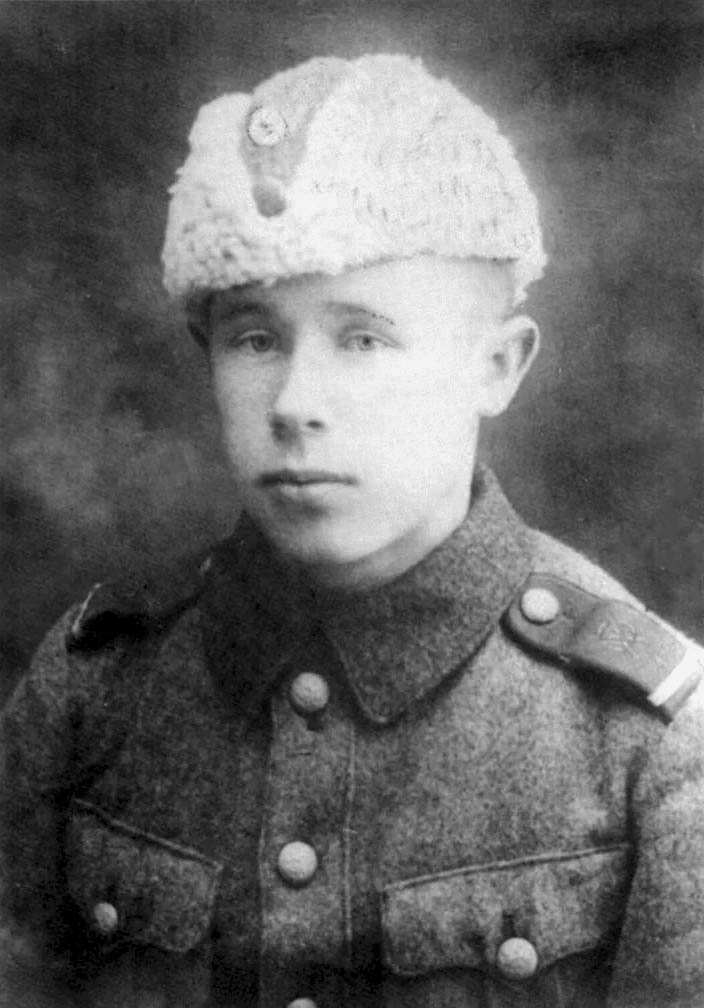
Häyhä in his Civil Guard uniform, c. 1922

Häyhä joined the Finnish voluntary militia, the Civil Guard (Suojeluskunta), at age 17. He excelled in shooting competitions in the Viipuri Province, and his home was reportedly filled with trophies for marksmanship. Not keen to hog the spotlight, he usually stood at the back in group photos during his youth, until his later successes forced him to take centre stage.

In 1925, at age 19, Häyhä began his 15-month compulsory military service in the Bicycle Battalion 2 in Raivola, Viipuri Province. He attended the Non-Commissioned Officer School and served as a conscript officer in the Bicycle Battalion 1 in Terijoki. However, he did not receive formal sniper training until 1938, a year before the war, at a training centre in Utti.

Tapio Saarelainen, a Doctor of Military Sciences and a major who worked as a longtime sniper instructor in the Finnish Defence Forces, interviewed Häyhä several times between 1997 and 2002 in an effort to understand the secrets behind his success as a sniper. Over the years, a friendship developed between the two, providing Saarelainen with a fresh perspective on the person behind his reputation as a Winter War sniper. According to Saarelainen, who wrote five books about Häyhä, including his biography, Häyhä could estimate distances of up to 150 m (490 ft) with a margin of error of 1 m (3 ft 3 in).

== Winter War service ==
Häyhä served as a sniper in the Finnish Army during the Winter War against the Soviet Union. He operated in the 6th Company of Infantry Regiment 34 (Jalkaväkirykmentti 34, or JR 34) under Lieutenant Aarne Juutilainen during the Battle of Kollaa. The winter of 1939–40 was one of the coldest on record in Finland. During the battle, temperatures ranged from −40 to −20 °C (−40 to −4 °F). Häyhä wore all-white camouflage, while Soviet troops were not issued camouflage uniforms for most of the war, making them easily visible in snowy conditions. The lack of winter camouflage reflected broader disorganisation within the Red Army following the purges of military leadership ordered by Joseph Stalin during the Great Purge of the late 1930s.

Finnish sources state that Häyhä was nicknamed "The White Death" by the Red Army (Russian: Белая смерть, Belaja smert; Finnish: valkoinen kuolema; Swedish: den vita döden). The name "White Death" has been suggested to originate entirely in Finnish propaganda, rather than having been given to Häyhä by the Russians; according to information from prisoners, to the Russians "White Death" referred to a severe frost in the deep forest. Häyhä having the nickname "White Death" first appeared in the Finnish Winter War literature of the late 1980s. During the war, the "White Death" was one of the leading themes of Finnish propaganda. Finnish newspapers frequently featured the invisible Finnish soldier, thus creating a hero of mythical proportions. To add to the myth, he was also nicknamed "The Magic Shooter" among Finns (Finnish: taika-ampuja, in close reference to the Finnish word for "sniper"; Finnish: tarkka-ampuja).

=== Achievements as a sniper ===
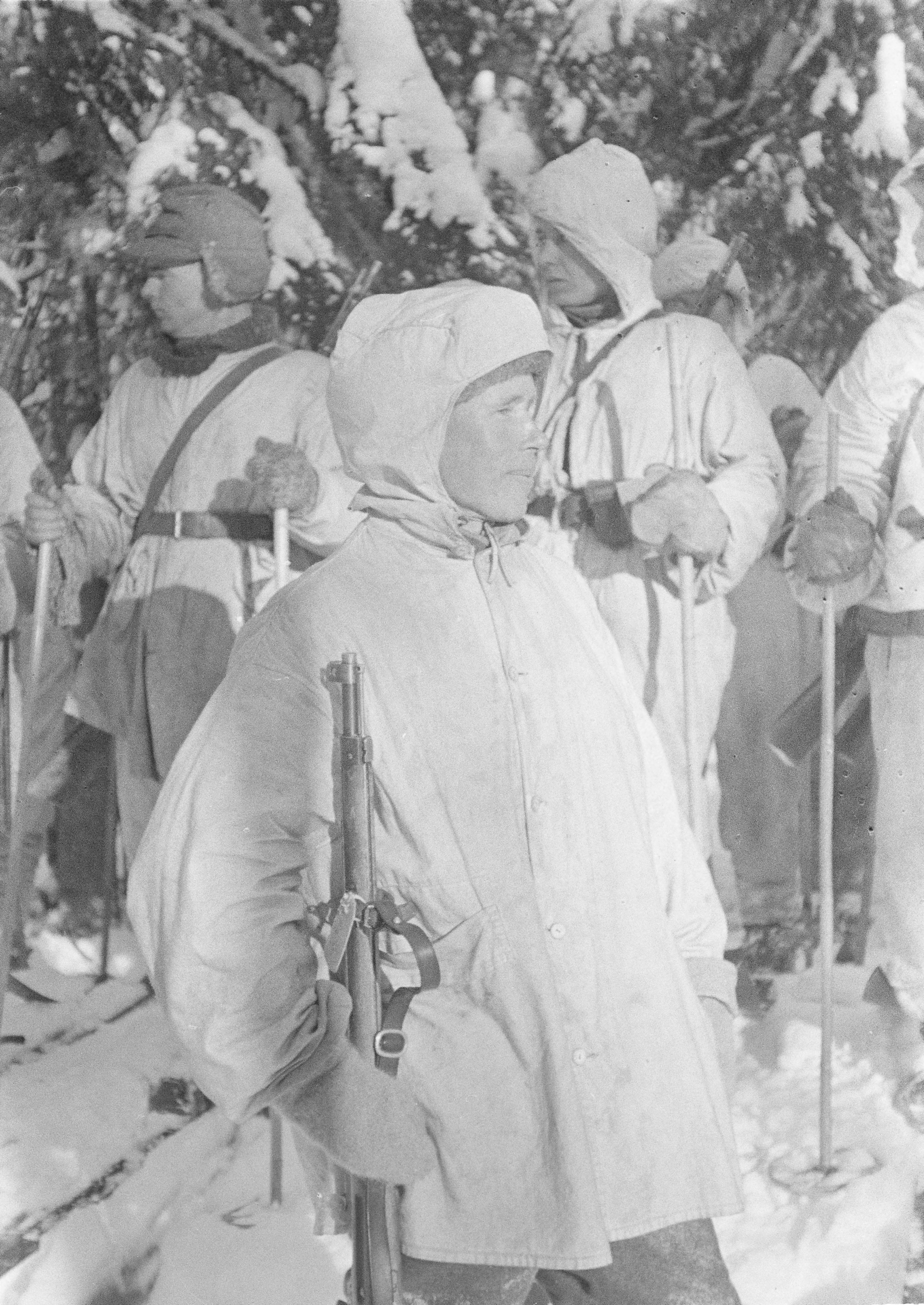
Häyhä in Kollaa on 17 February 1940, right after being awarded the honorary rifle.

All of Häyhä's kills were accomplished in less than 100 days, an average of five per day at a time of year with very few daylight hours. His kill count as a sniper was based on his own reporting, with the confirmation of his comrades, and only those who were verified to be dead were counted. No count was taken when several snipers shot at the same target. Enemy soldiers killed with a submachine gun with Häyhä as a group leader were not counted.

Häyhä's division commander Antero Svensson credited him with 219 confirmed kills with a rifle and an equal number of kills by submachine gun, when he awarded Häyhä with an honorary rifle on 17 February 1940. On 21 December 1939, Häyhä achieved his highest daily count of 25 kills. In his diary, military chaplain Antti Rantamaa reported 259 confirmed kills made by rifle and an equal number of kills by submachine gun from the beginning of the war until 7 March 1940, one day after Häyhä was severely wounded.

Some of Häyhä's figures are from a Finnish Army document, counted from the beginning of the war, 30 November 1939:

- 22 December 1939: 138 sniper kills in 22 days
- 26 January 1940: 199 sniper kills (61 in 35 days)
- 17 February 1940: 219 sniper kills (20 in 22 days)
- 7 March 1940 (one day after he was wounded): total of 259 sniper kills (40 in 18 days)

Häyhä never discussed it publicly, but his own private memoir, discovered in 2017, states a number. He begins by stating that "this is his sin list", and estimates the total number he shot to be around 500.

Finnish historian Risto Marjomaa questions the large number, as confirmation of casualties was difficult due to the absence of the bodies. In his article, published by the National Biography of Finland, Marjomaa credited Häyhä with the total number of "more than two hundred" kills. Complicating matters further is the use of Häyhä's achievements as a tool of propaganda: the Finnish press built a hero's myth around Häyhä at the early stage of the war.

=== Firearms and tactics ===
Häyhä used his issued Civil Guard rifle, an early series SAKO M/28-30, serial number 35281, Civil Guard number S60974. It was a Finnish Civil Guard variant of the Mosin–Nagant rifle known as "Pystykorva" (lit. 'The Spitz' due to the front sight's resemblance to the head of a spitz-type dog) chambered in the Finnish-designed Mosin–Nagant cartridge 7.62×53R. When fighting as a group leader with the rest of his unit, he used a Suomi KP/-31 submachine gun.

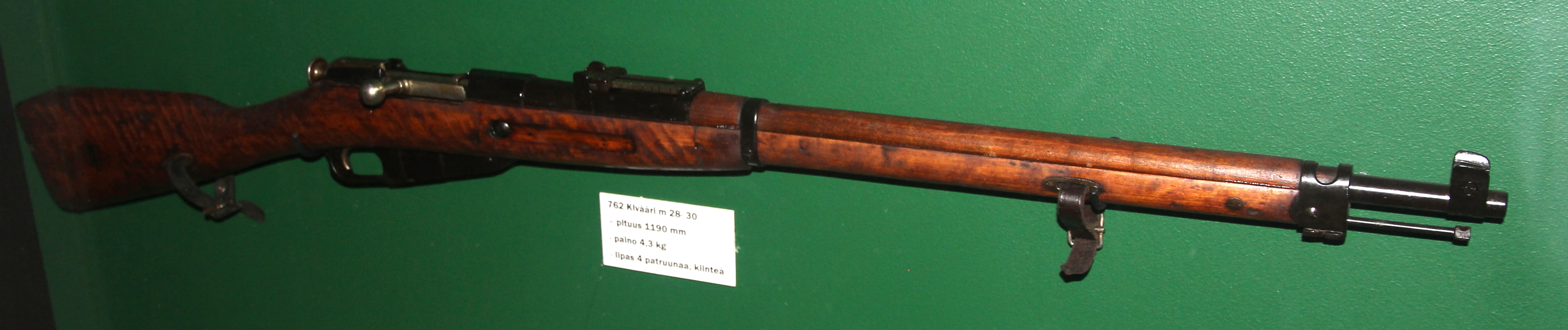
Finnish Mosin–Nagant M28-30 rifle. Unlike the Russian variant, it has improved iron sights.

Häyhä preferred iron sights over telescopic sights, as they enable a sniper to present a smaller target for the enemy (a sniper must raise his head a few centimetres higher when using a telescopic sight), and can be relied on even in extreme cold, unlike telescopic sights which tend to cloud up in cold weather. Another disadvantage of telescopic sights is that sunlight may reflect off the lenses and reveal the sniper's position. Häyhä did not have prior training with scoped rifles, and therefore preferred not to switch to the Soviet scoped rifle (M/91-30 PE or PEM).

Häyhä dealt with the intense cold by dressing properly with multiple layers of clothing. He kept sugar and bread in his pockets, consuming them for the calories necessary to keep his body warm. His slight stature of 160 centimetres (5 ft 3 in) assisted him in disguising his position. Hidden in a snow pit, he could lie still and observe the enemy for long periods of time. It was Häyhä's custom to move, well before daybreak, to the position he had prepared, and stay there until after sunset. He would frequently pack dense mounds of snow in front of his position to conceal himself, provide padding for his rifle, and reduce the characteristic puff of snow stirred up by the muzzle blast. He was known to keep snow in his mouth while sniping to prevent his breath in the cold air from giving away his position.

=== Injury ===
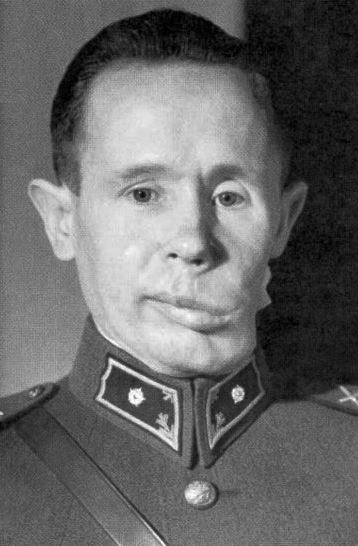
Häyhä after being promoted to second lieutenant in 1940. He was disfigured after being shot in the face by a Red Army soldier earlier that year.

On 6 March 1940, just a week before the end of the war, Häyhä was severely wounded when an explosive bullet fired by a Red Army soldier tore through his face and shattered his lower left jaw. After the battle, as he appeared to be dead, he was placed on a pile of corpses. Someone later noticed his foot moving and he was removed from the pile and taken to hospital.

Rumours of Häyhä's death spread throughout Finland and the Soviet Union. He regained consciousness a week later, on 13 March, the day peace was declared. Reading about his own death in a newspaper, he sent a letter to the paper to correct the misunderstanding.

Recovery took considerable time and required extensive treatment and multiple surgeries, leaving visible scars that remained for the rest of his life. Despite this, when the Continuation War (1941–1944) broke out, he requested permission to return to the front lines. However, due to the severity of his facial injuries, from which he was still recovering, his request was denied. Häyhä spent the Continuation War on the home front, tending to his farm.

In his private war memoir, written a few months after he was wounded, Häyhä recorded several brief accounts from the Winter War. Discovered decades later, one anecdote describes an incident involving the capture of a Soviet soldier by his unit: "After Christmas, we captured a Russkie, blindfolded him, spun him around until he was disoriented, and took him to a feast in the tent of the Terror of Morocco. The Russkie was content with the revelry, but when he was sent back, it felt very repugnant to him."

== Honours ==
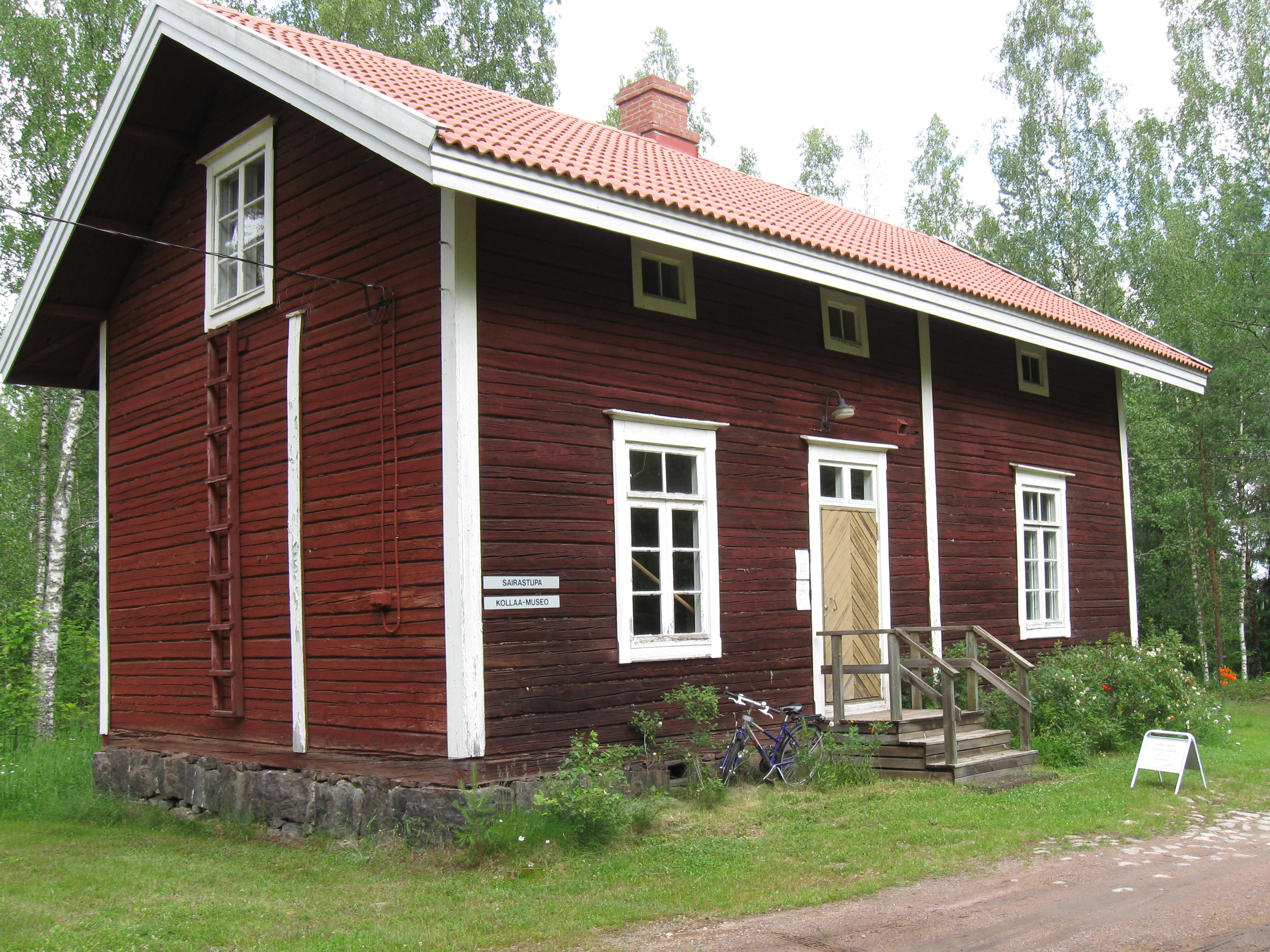
The Kollaa and Simo Häyhä Museum in Miettilä, Rautjärvi, Finland

Häyhä was awarded the First and Second class Medals of Liberty, as well as the Third and Fourth class Crosses of Liberty. The latter two were normally granted to only commissioned officers. As an additional honour, on 17 February 1940, he received a name-plated SAKO M/28-30 “Pystykorva” Honorary Rifle (serial number 100 781), donated by Eugen Johansson, a Swedish businessman and supporter of Finland. According to an unofficial count, he had shot 219 Red Army soldiers at the time. He later donated the rifle to the Karelia Jaeger Battalion's Heritage Room, from where it was transferred to the Finnish Military Museum's collection after the dissolution of the North Karelia Brigade in 2013.

Shortly after the Winter War, on 28 August 1940, Finnish Field Marshal Carl Gustaf Emil Mannerheim promoted Häyhä straight from alikersantti (the lowest military rank of a non-commissioned officer) to vänrikki (the first military rank of an officer). In 1941, Häyhä was also nominated as a Knight of the Mannerheim Cross, the most distinguished Finnish military honour. However, due to administrative reasons, the knighthood was not granted, as the cross was not awarded to anyone solely for achievements in the Winter War. He also received the Cross of Kollaa medal, one of the first seven made of silver. Häyhä's cross was numbered four, following Marshal Mannerheim, President Kyösti Kallio, and Häyhä's division commander, Colonel Antero Svensson.

The Kollaa and Simo Häyhä Museum (Kollaa ja Simo Häyhä -museo) is located in the village of Miettilä at Rautjärvi, in a former infirmary. The museum, opened in 1983, covers the Battle of Kollaa, and features a special permanent exhibition dedicated to the life of Simo Häyhä.

In the 2004 Suuret suomalaiset (Great Finns) television show and poll, which determined the 100 greatest Finns of all time, Häyhä was ranked 74th.

== Post-war life ==
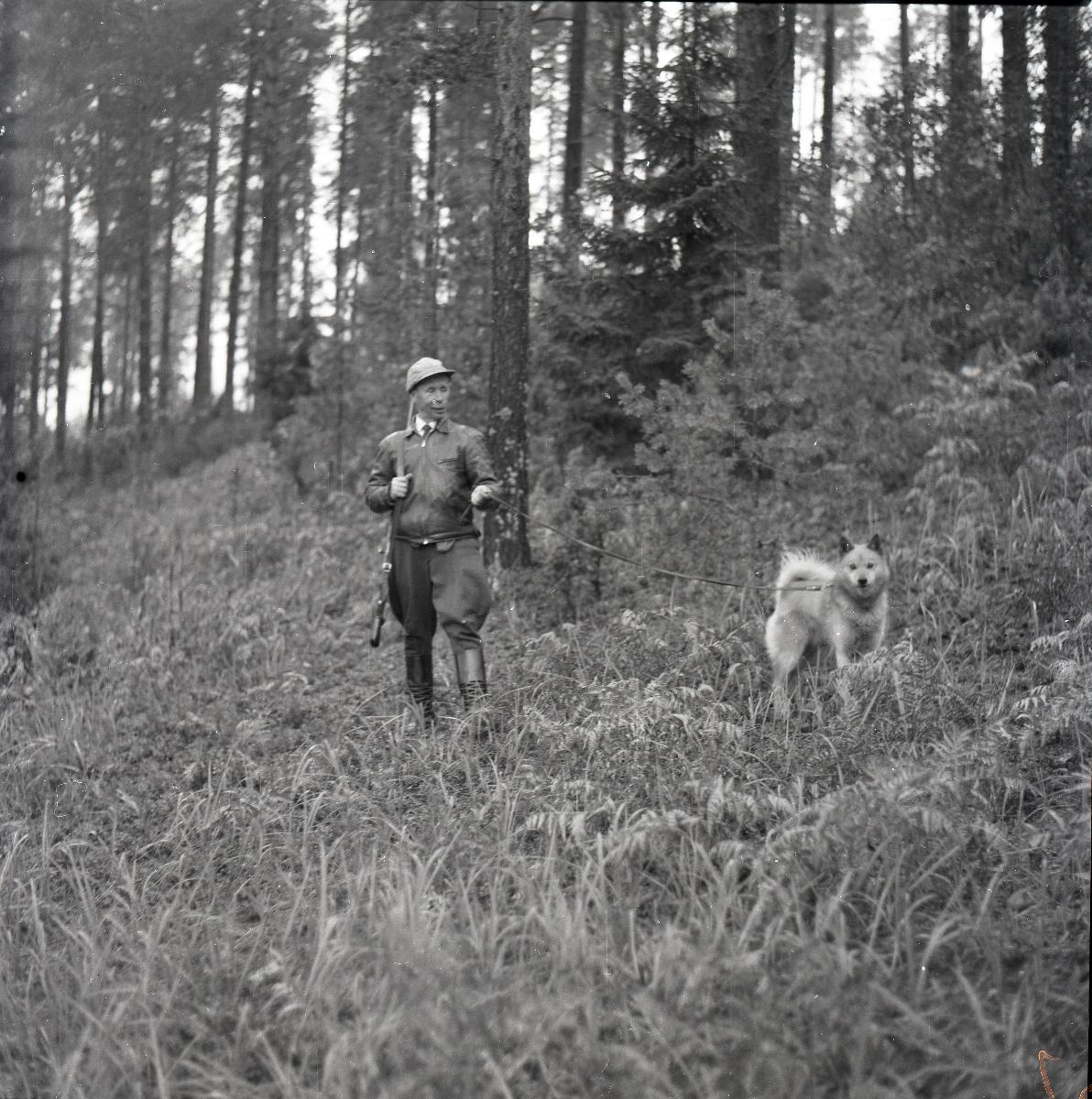
After the war, Häyhä spent his free time hunting. Häyhä with his dog Kille in 1961.

It took several years for Häyhä to recuperate from his wound. Although his face remained disfigured, he otherwise made a full recovery. Häyhä's family farm was located in the territory ceded in the peace agreement, forcing him to start his life over in Valkjärvi ("Whitelake"), Ruokolahti, a small municipality in southeastern Finland, near the Soviet border, where he worked as a farmer. Beyond farming, he had a deep passion for hunting. He was known in his home town as a quiet, peaceful man who loved nature and was often seen with his hunting dog, Kille, a Finnish Spitz. Häyhä participated in numerous hunting parties over the years, including those with the President of Finland, Urho Kekkonen. He became a successful moose hunter and dog breeder. Häyhä also served as a long-time board member of the Kollaa Fighters' Brotherhood, formed after the Winter War in May 1940.

However, some people did not approve of his actions during the Winter War; he was met with hate and even death threats. The injuries he sustained in the war left recognisable facial scars, so as a well-known person, he avoided large groups of people. He never married, and lived as a bachelor. He enjoyed working, but he suffered from loneliness and fear; nights were especially difficult for him. However, he had friends and also spent time at his parents' and siblings' homes after the war. Eventually farm work became too difficult, so he put the farm up for rent, and moved to an apartment building in the centre of Ruokolahti.

In December 1972, Häyhä bought himself a yellow Volkswagen 1300 from a car dealership in Imatra for around ten thousand Finnish marks (equivalent to €15,200 in 2023). Today, the car is hidden in the attic of a barn in Häyhä's former home municipality, Rautjärvi; its current owners have announced that they have no intention of selling the car.

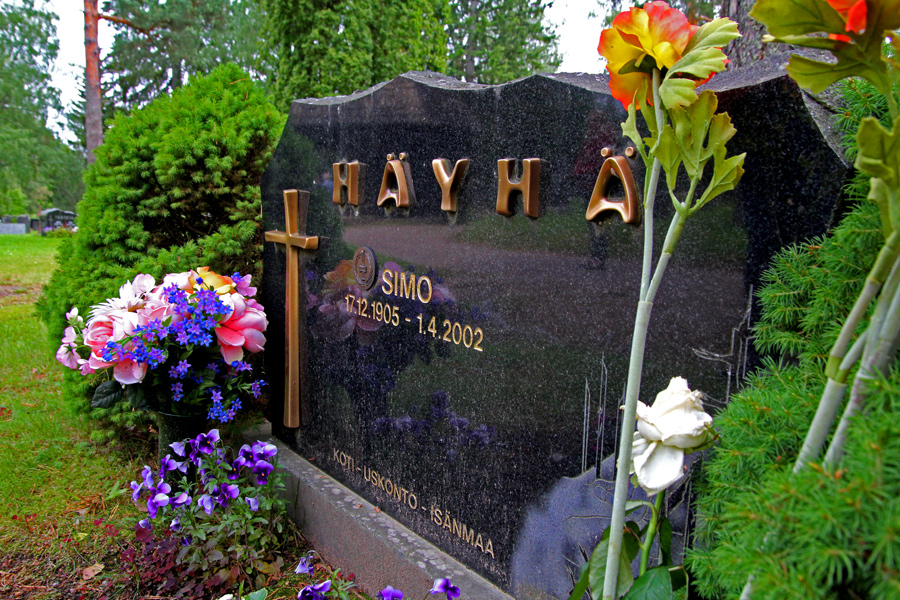
Häyhä's gravestone in the Ruokolahti Church graveyard, with the inscription: "Home – Religion – Fatherland"

Häyhä was known as a modest man who never boasted of his wartime achievements. He rarely spoke of the war or his experiences. When asked in 1998 how he had become such a good sniper, he replied simply: "Practice". In an Independence Day interview with Helsingin Sanomat in December 2001, shortly before his 96th birthday, Häyhä opened up about his war experiences. He was asked if he felt remorse for having killed so many people. He replied, "I did what I was told, as well as I could. There would be no Finland unless everyone had done the same."

Häyhä spent his last years in a war veterans' nursing home in Hamina, where he died on 1 April 2002, aged 96. He was buried in his home town of Ruokolahti.

== In popular culture ==
Häyhä featured in the Record of Ragnarok manga

Swedish heavy metal band Sabaton composed the song "White Death" in honour of Häyhä, which was released in 2010 on their album Coat of Arms. Scottish black/thrash metal band Achren's three-song The White Death EP from 2014 is dedicated entirely to Häyhä, right down to the cover art. Japanese metal band To Mega Therion has made a song called "Simo Hayha", which appears on the 2015 Yog = Sothoth album.

In 2011, Philip Kaufman began filming HBO's Hemingway & Gellhorn (first airdate 28 May 2012), which features Martha Gellhorn (played by Nicole Kidman) reporting from Finland during the Winter War. In this section, Steven Wiig portrays Häyhä, leading a group of Finnish soldiers to shelter.

A film about Häyhä called The White Death, directed by David McElroy and written by James Poirier, has also been planned since 2017, but the progress of this production has remained unclear. In 2025, it was announced that director and screenwriter Toni Kurkimäki was working on a film about Häyhä, simply titled Häyhä, and Jarkko Lahti was cast as the title character. Filming is scheduled to begin in the North Savo and Kainuu regions in January 2027.

According to Jalmari Helander, who wrote and directed the script for the 2022 action film Sisu, and its 2025 sequel, the films are partly inspired by Häyhä's legendary reputation.

U.S. author Arna Bontemps Hemenway has written a short story about Häyhä, called "Wolves of Karelia", which was published in the August 2019 issue of The Atlantic magazine. Häyhä also appears in the 2024 novel Les Guerriers de l'hiver by Olivier Norek.

Häyhä's story has been adapted in two manga, in one called The White Witch (Japanese: 白い魔女, Shiroi Majo) by Nagakawa Naruki, the main character is named Simo Häyhä, but is female. He also appears in the manga Record of Ragnarok (Japanese: 終末のワルキューレ, Shūmatsu no Warukyūre) by Shinya Umemura and Takumi Fukui, in which he is depicted as a fighter for humanity.

"Red Baron vs. White Death", the ninth episode of the seventh season of Epic Rap Battles of History, which aired on 12 December 2025 on YouTube, featured Häyhä (played by Lloyd Ahlquist) battling another historical war legend, Manfred von Richthofen (played by Peter Shukoff), known as the "Red Baron".

== See also ==
- List of Finnish soldiers
- List of snipers
