= Ruokolahti Church =

- Ruokolahden kirkko
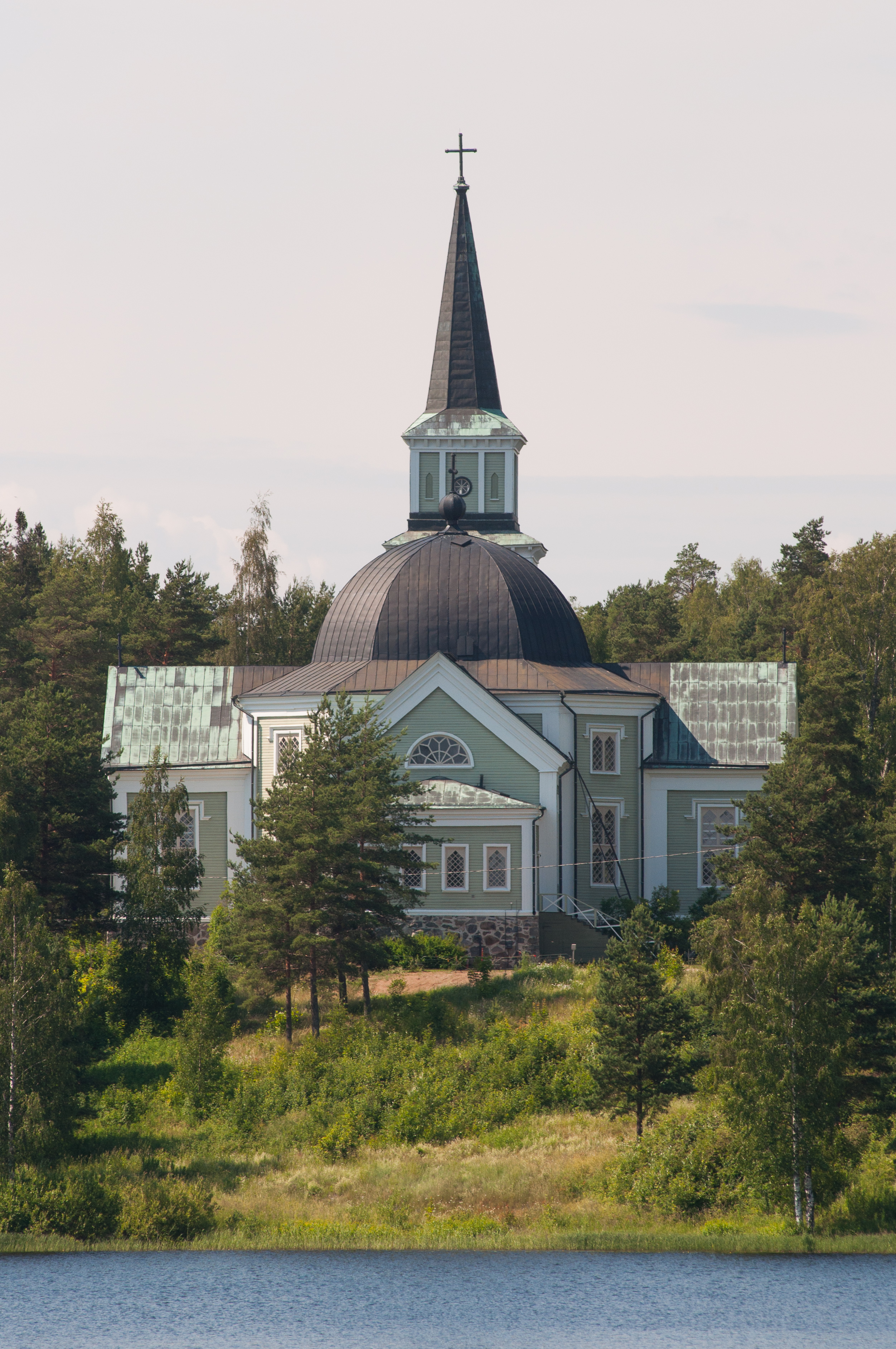
- Ruokolahti Church in 2012
- Ruokolahti Church
- 61.28444°N 28.82986°E
- Location: Ruokolahti
- Country: Finland
- Denomination: Lutheran
- Website: ruokolahdenseurakunta.fi

History
- Status: Parish church

Architecture
- Functional status: Active
- Heritage designation: Protected
- Architect: Ernst Lohrmann
- Style: Neogothic (partly)
- Completed: 1854

Specifications
- Capacity: c. 1,200
- Materials: Timber

Administration
- Parish: Ruokolahti parish (Ruokolahden seurakunta)

Ruokolahti Church (Finnish: Ruokolahden kirkko, Swedish: Ruokolax kyrka) is the Lutheran church in the town centre of Ruokolahti, in south-eastern Finland, and the main church of the Ruokolahti parish.

The church was designed in 1852 by a leading architect of the mid-19th century in Finland, Ernst Lohrmann, constructed of timber, and completed in 1854. The belfry predates the current church by 100 years, having been built in 1752 for the previous church in the same spot. The church and belfry have been designated and protected by the Finnish Heritage Agency as a nationally important built cultural environment (Valtakunnallisesti merkittävä rakennettu kulttuuriympäristö).

The current altarpiece is a 1915 painting by Alexandra Frosterus-Såltin, titled Kristus ristillä ('Christ on the cross'). It is her 50th and final altarpiece.

Ruokolahti Church is featured in a famous 1887 painting by Albert Edelfelt, Ruokolahden eukkoja kirkonmäellä (lit. 'Women outside the Church at Ruokolahti'), housed in the Ateneum art museum of the Finnish National Gallery in Helsinki.

Finnish veteran Simo Häyhä, known better by his epithet "The White Death," is buried in the graveyard.

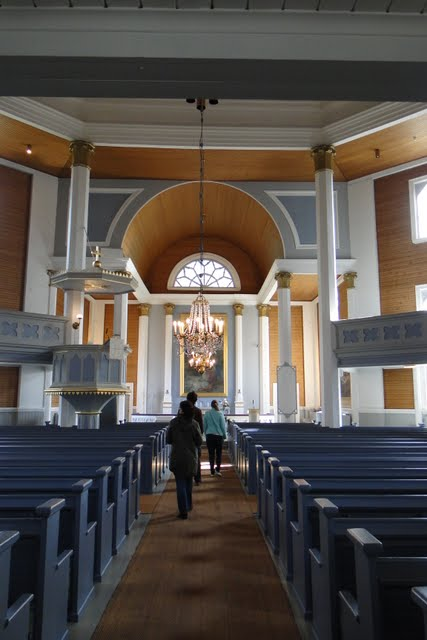
Interior

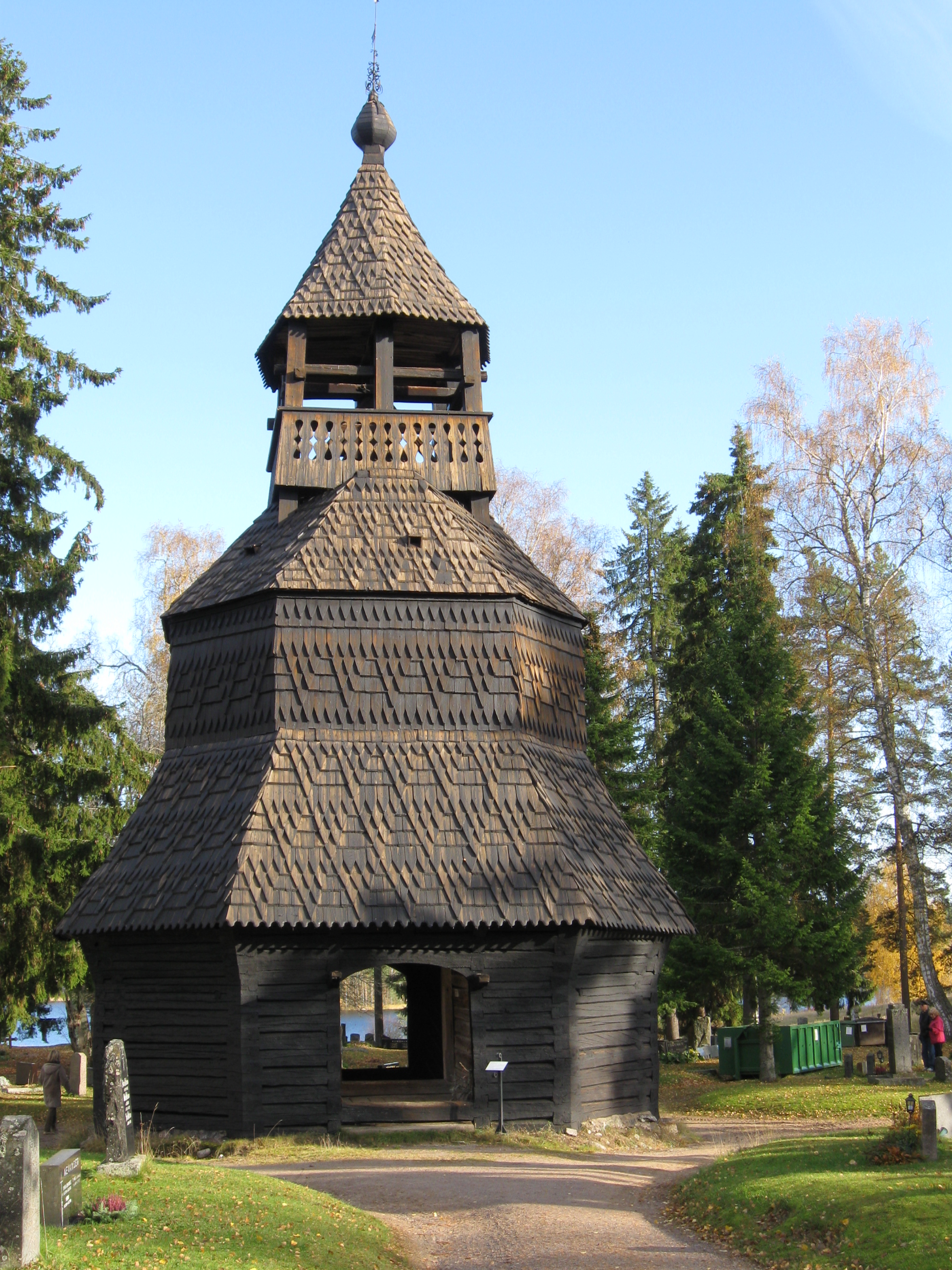
Belfry

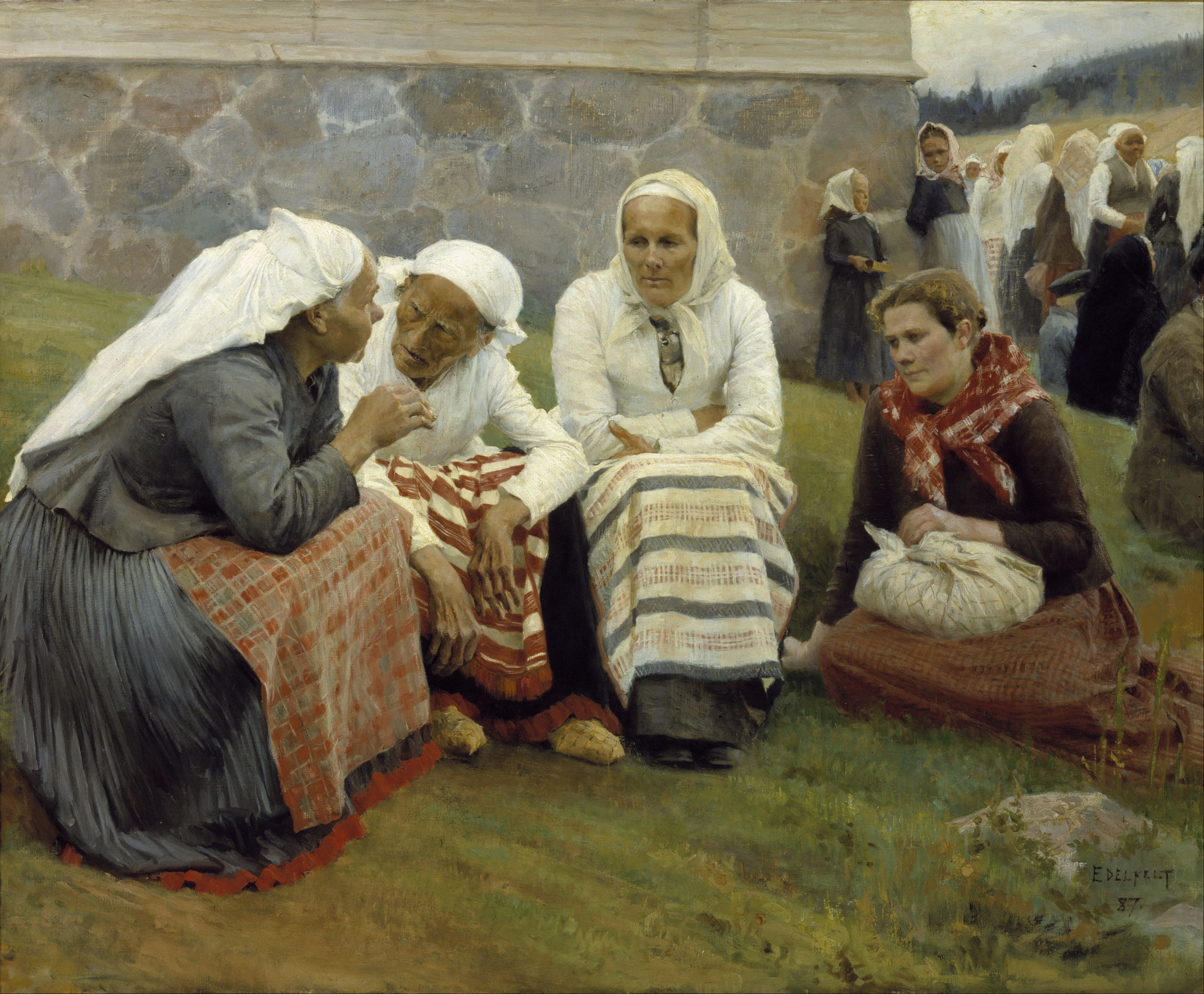
'Women outside the Church at Ruokolahti' (1887), Albert Edelfelt
