= 168th Rifle Division =

168th Rifle Division (August 1939 - January 1946)
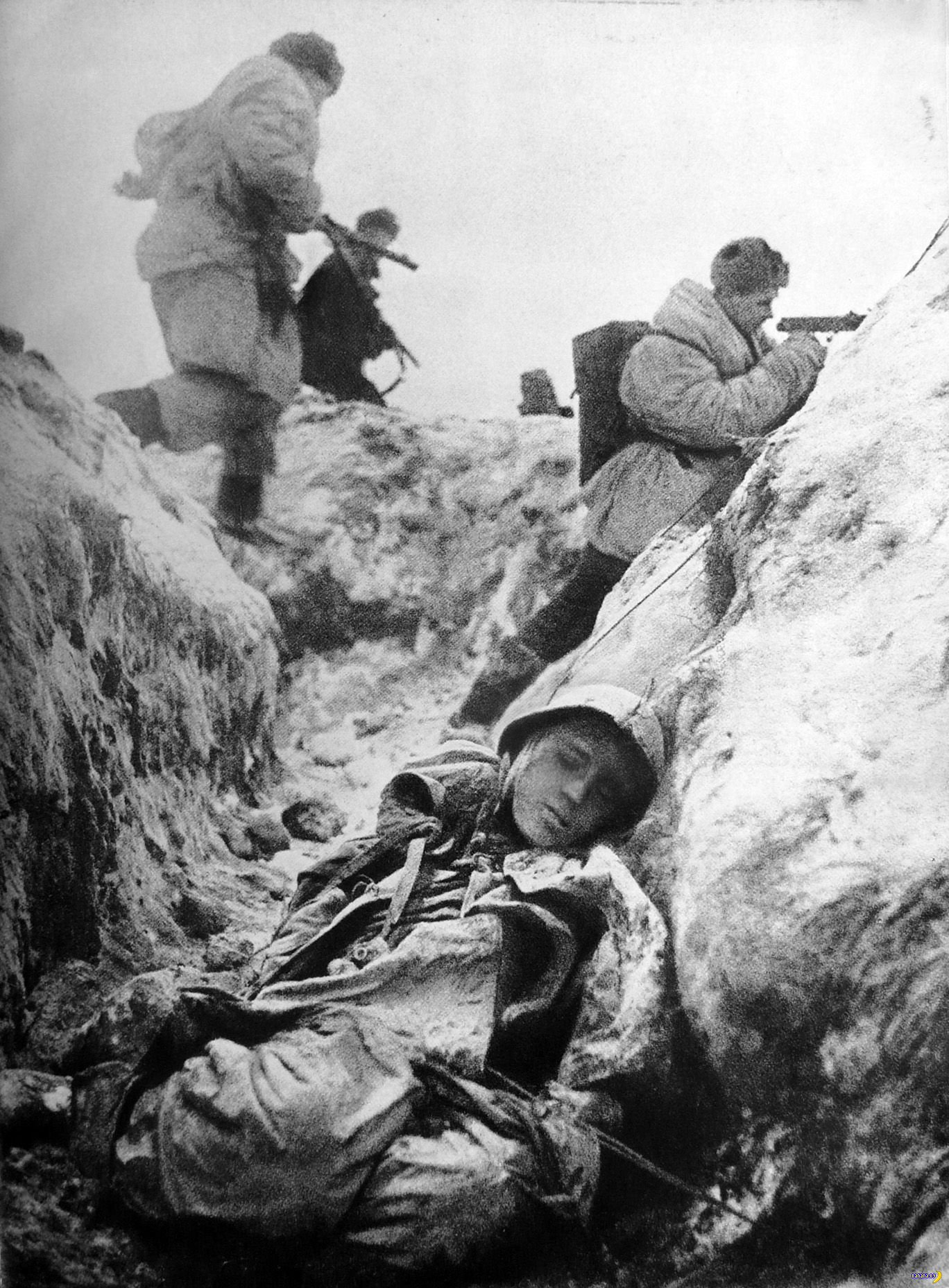
- Soldiers of the 168th in combat, Leningrad Front, 1943
- Active: 1939–1946
- Country: Soviet Union
- Branch: Red Army
- Type: Infantry
- Size: Division
- Engagements: Winter War; Continuation War; Siege of Leningrad; Leningrad–Novgorod offensive Krasnoye Selo–Ropsha offensive Vyborg–Petrozavodsk offensive Battle of Tali–Ihantala; Baltic offensive Riga offensive (1944); Courland Pocket
- Battle honours: Riga

Commanders
- Notable commanders: Maj. Gen. Andrei Leontevich Bondarev; Maj. Gen. Pantelemon Aleksandrovich Zaitsev; Maj. Gen. Aleksandr Aleksandrovich Egorov; Maj. Gen. Pyotr Ivanovich Olkhovskii

The 168th Rifle Division was formed as an infantry division of the Red Army in the Leningrad Military District in August - September 1939, based on the shtat (table of organization and equipment) of the latter month. It was the highest-numbered rifle division to take part in the Winter War against Finland, and attempted to advance west along the north shore of Lake Ladoga as part of 8th Army, but was encircled near Kitelä and remained in this pocket, struggling for survival, for the duration of the conflict. At the start of the Continuation War it was deployed in the same general area along the new USSR/Finland border as part of 7th Army in Northern Front. The Finnish Army crossed the border on June 25, 1941, and the 168th soon found itself again encircled on the shore of Ladoga. In the third week of August it was evacuated to Leningrad and assigned to Leningrad Front's 55th Army. During November it took part in the first offensive to try to break the German/Finnish siege by attacking out of a small bridgehead over the Neva River and then exploiting toward Sinyavino to link up with 54th Army attacking eastward. This effort soon became a bloodbath despite the commitment of reinforcements and a number of tanks. At the end of the year the remnants of the division were removed from the bridgehead and moved through the city and then marched across the frozen Gulf of Finland to reinforce the Front's Coastal Operational Group in the Oranienbaum Bridgehead, where it would remain until January 1944, when it took part in the offensive that drove Army Group North away from the city. It began the offensive as part of 2nd Shock Army, but after linking up with the forces striking west out of Leningrad the 168th was moved to 42nd Army and under this command drove south and west toward Pskov before coming up against the defenses of the Panther Line. In June it was moved back north of Leningrad to face Finland as part of 21st Army in the offensive that drove that nation out of the war. In August it rejoined 42nd Army, now as part of 2nd Baltic Front and took part in the offensive through the Baltic states toward Riga, where it won a battle honor. Until the final weeks of the war the 168th was part of the forces containing the German grouping in the Courland Pocket, when it was moved to the Reserve of the Supreme High Command. It was finally disbanded in January 1946.

== Formation ==
The division first began forming in August 1939, at Cherepovets in the Leningrad Military District, based on a cadre from the 14th Rifle Division. Its order of battle (as of 1941) was as follows:

- 260th Rifle Regiment
- 402nd Rifle Regiment
- 462nd Rifle Regiment
- 453rd Artillery Regiment (until December 4, 1941, then 412th)
- 412th Howitzer Artillery Regiment (until December 4, 1941)
- 220th Antitank Battalion
- 351st Antiaircraft Battery (later 176th Antiaircraft Battalion, until May 15, 1943)
- 187th Reconnaissance Company (later 187th Battalion)
- 215th Sapper Battalion
- 209th Signal Battalion (later 906th Signal Company)
- 216th Medical/Sanitation Battalion
- 157th Chemical Defense (Anti-gas) Platoon
- 231st Motor Transport Company (later 231st Battalion)
- 150th Field Bakery (later 299th Motorized Field Bakery)
- 284th Divisional Veterinary Hospital
- 93rd Divisional Artillery Workshop
- 187th Field Postal Station
- 200th Field Office of the State Bank

Col. Andrei Leontevich Bondarev was appointed to command on August 23. This officer had previously led the 43rd Rifle Division.

== Winter War ==
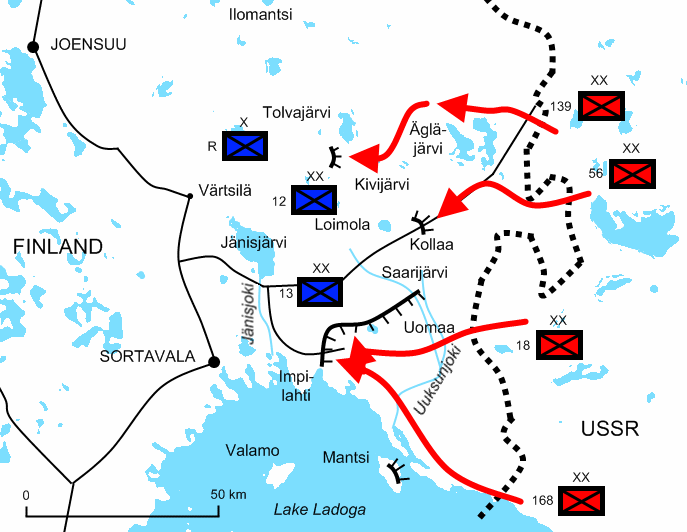
Advance of 8th Army. Note positions of the 168th.

The division was deployed to 8th Army, to the northeast of Lake Ladoga. The Army had six divisions under command, with the 18th and 168th on the left flank under command of 56th Rifle Corps. They were to work together to advance in the direction of Sortavala in an effort to outflank the Mannerheim Line on the Karelian Isthmus. The 168th's route followed a road along the lake shore, and this would spare it the fate of the 18th.

The Army also had two tank brigades under command and faced the Finnish IV Corps. This Corps was thinly spread and the strength the Red Army was able to deploy on this sector came as a nasty surprise. A new rail line had been extended during the fall from 8th Army's main supply base at Petrozavodsk up to the border near the town of Suojärvi. The Finnish Army commander, Field Marshal C. G. E. Mannerheim, had expected nothing more than reconnaissance forces in this area and quickly realized that 56th Corps could outflank the entire IV Corps from the northeast, or push west through Tolvajärvi into the interior. This presented a crisis for the Finns, and by the time it was stabilized Mannerheim had been forced to commit over 30 percent of his total available reserves; this would adversely affect his ability to reinforce the defenders of the Isthmus. He wrote on the night of December 1, the second day of the War:

2. On the north of Ladoga itself the Russian 168th Division under General [sic] Bondarev struck at Salmi. The plan called for it to advance to a line that ran from Koirinoja to Kitelä and there join forces with the Eighteenth Division... which had attacked along the Uomaa road, parallel to and about 20 miles north of the Ladoga coastal road. The plan evolved so that the Eighteenth soon received orders to turn north toward Syskyjärvi, four miles north of the Lemetti road junction and attack the Kollaa defense line from the rear at the same time it secured the flank of the 168th Division.

The sheer size and power of the Soviet attacks all along the front very nearly overwhelmed the Finns during the first days.

As Mannerheim understood, during December 1 Bondarev's division passed Salmi and was moving through Pitkäranta toward Kitelä against negligible resistance. However, the greater threat was assessed as being from the 139th Rifle Division on the road to Tolvajärvi, and it was decided to take a stand there. This led to the Battle of Tolvajärvi, which climaxed on December 12 with a Finnish victory. Meanwhile, the commander of IV Corps, Maj. Gen. J. W. Hägglund, had led his soldiers back to the Kollaa line by December 7. However, he had plans for a counteroffensive in which the 168th would be encircled at Kitelä while the 18th Division and other units were driven back across the border. In the event, this led to the other units, after being broken apart, digging in in encirclement, in what became known as mottis. While "motti tactics" were heralded as a tactical innovation, Hägglund later wrote that he only planned to trap the 168th, and the other 11 mottis "just happened." While they represented a tactical victory they were also, more often than not, strategic failures, as the Finns did not have the resources to destroy them.

=== The Great Motti ===
As the situation of IV Corps stabilized, Hägglund began to put his original plan into action on December 12. Leading into the right flank of 56th Corps some 12km behind the front line was a north-south secondary route called the Siira road, which offered an excellent approach route to the Uomaa road. Eight Finnish battalions were assembled near Kotajärvi, but the approach march was badly managed. The terrain was difficult even by Finnish standards, and the infantry soon became tired; heavier equipment and extra ammunition was left for follow-up troops to bring forward. Only three battalions managed to make any headway at the road junction against heavy Soviet shellfire, and 18th Division was soon organizing counterattacks from both east and west that included the 34th Tank Brigade. The next evening the worn-out Finns broke contact and fell back up the Siira road, unable even to hold their minimal gains. Units of the 18th set out in pursuit, but not beyond the range of their artillery. The attack should have served to alert the Red Army command that a counteroffensive was in the works, but their forces failed to take any countermeasures.

Hägglund made a second attempt on December 17, this time in a conventional frontal assault against the main line of 8th Army between Ruokojärvi and Syskyjärvi, but this made little progress in the face of superior Soviet firepower. As Finnish casualties mounted the operation was called off, although it may have served as a feint to distract from Hägglund's real objective against 56th Corps. Mannerheim, meanwhile, was losing patience and sent orders to speed things along. By now a victory had been won at Tolvajärvi and the Kollaa line was holding; as well the weather had turned in favor of the Finns with heavy snowfalls making it difficult to keep Soviet supply routes open. Hägglund's plan was, first, to attack at Uomaa village to cut 18th Division's communications and establish a roadblock facing east to prevent the arrival of reinforcements. The main assault would be made by two Task Forces, "A" (Autti), and "H" (Hannukselka), named for their commanders. These would hit the 18th's line on a 15km-wide stretch of the Uomaa road, break through at several points, and then drive south the Ladoga shore, cutting off the 168th. At this point Hägglund was confident that the two divisions would either launch local counterattacks, which he was confident his troops could hold against, or withdraw entirely from the Ladoga shore back to Soviet territory. This latter would free a Finnish division to reinforce the Isthmus front.

The operation began on December 26 with a feint attack near Syskyjärvi. The next day a raid in force struck Uomaa village; the defenders of 18th Division put up a stiff defense, falling back on fortified buildings in the village center. The Finns detached a screen of troops to keep the garrison surrounded before moving east to set up the roadblock. Meanwhile, Colonel Autti avoided the mistake of moving his force through the woods, and instead formed them up astride the Siira road just beyond line-of-sight from the Soviet positions, and after an artillery preparation sent them in a flat-out charge down the road. The charge hit the line and broke through. By twilight (nearly all this fighting took place in semi- or full-darkness) they were able to bring the Uomaa road under small arms fire, and the next morning they took the road junction. By January 3, 1940, the defenders had been pushed into a figure-eight-shaped motti west of the junction. Colonel Hannukselka's force was similarly successful and by the end of the first week of January the 18th had been broken up unto multiple mottis along the Uomaa road, while on January 11 the 168th was confined to what became known as the "Great Motti" south and east of Kitelä. In this position the division still had access to Lake Ladoga.

In common with the smaller mottis, starvation was not an immediate concern due to the large number of draft horses available. Air resupply was also used, despite considerable interference from Finnish antiaircraft fire. The "Great Motti" was some 52km^{2} in area and it became a point of pride that it would not fall. It was a naturally strong position; the lake shore was practically lined with granite headlands and outcroppings while the inland perimeter ran along a series of wooded ridges where Bondarev had dug in the division's tanks. The two artillery regiments were concentrated in the center to provide all-round fire support. A tenuous line of supply was established along the shore from the new front line at Pitkäranta to the southeast sector of the "Motti" at Koirinoja. As Ladoga froze solid, in a foreshadowing of the siege of Leningrad, the shore route was replaced by an ice road. Hägglund's forces were barely adequate to maintain the siege of this and the other mottis and was unable to interfere except with small ski detachments which emplaced themselves on several small islets along the route, which led to savage nighttime battles with the strongly escorted supply columns. In early March, not long before the end of the war, the Soviets launched an offensive against these islets with massive air and artillery bombardments and waves of infantry. Only a handful of the Finns survived this attack. The fighting ended on March 13 with the 168th still in place. The 18th Division was less fortunate. It lost its divisional banner in one of the motti battles, suffered heavy casualties, and was disbanded. While the War had not been the disaster for the 168th that it had been for some other rifle divisions it still suffered some 7,000 casualties, roughly half its strength, in 3 1/2 months.

==== Postwar ====
On May 20 the 402nd Rifle Regiment was recognized for its role in the fighting with the award of the Order of the Red Banner. On the same day, two men of the division were made Heroes of the Soviet Union. Sen. Lt. Pavel Ivanovich Ivanovskii was the commander of the reconnaissance company of the 462nd Rifle Regiment. He distinguished himself on December 29, 1939, by leading his scouts in defeating several Finnish attacks at the cost of his own life. He would be buried in Sortavala. Jr. Lt. Vasilii Mikhailovich Yuzhakov commanded the cavalry platoon of the 402nd Rifle Regiment; on December 3 he led a small group of his troopers to defeat a Finnish detachment that had penetrated into the regiment's rear. On January 14, 1940, he led his platoon to defeat a group of Finns trying to capture an important height in the Lemetti crossroads area. After the Winter War he furthered his military education and eventually rose to command of a rifle regiment. He died on September 18, 1966, and was buried at Vologda.

== Continuation War ==
Bondarev was sent to the Frunze Military Academy in November to further his military education and was replaced by Col. Andrei Fyodorovich Mashoshin until March 14, 1941, when Bondarev returned. Mashoshin would be in command of the 177th Rifle Division at the time of the German invasion, and would lead several other divisions until mid-1944. Bondarev would be promoted to the rank of major general on October 7. On June 22 the 168th was part of 7th Army in Leningrad Military District, which was soon renamed Northern Front. Much of West Karelia had been transferred to the USSR in the peace treaty, including the north shore of Lake Ladoga, and the division was deployed in the same general area where it had fought in the Winter War, northwest of Sortavala. In planning done by the staff of Lt. Gen. M. M. Popov, commander of Leningrad District, less than a month before the invasion, 7th Army constituted Covering Region No. 2 of the District, responsible for the sector along the Finnish border from Lake Onega to Lake Ladoga with four rifle divisions and one fortified region. At this time Col. Aleksandr Ignatevich Korolev was serving as the division's chief of staff.

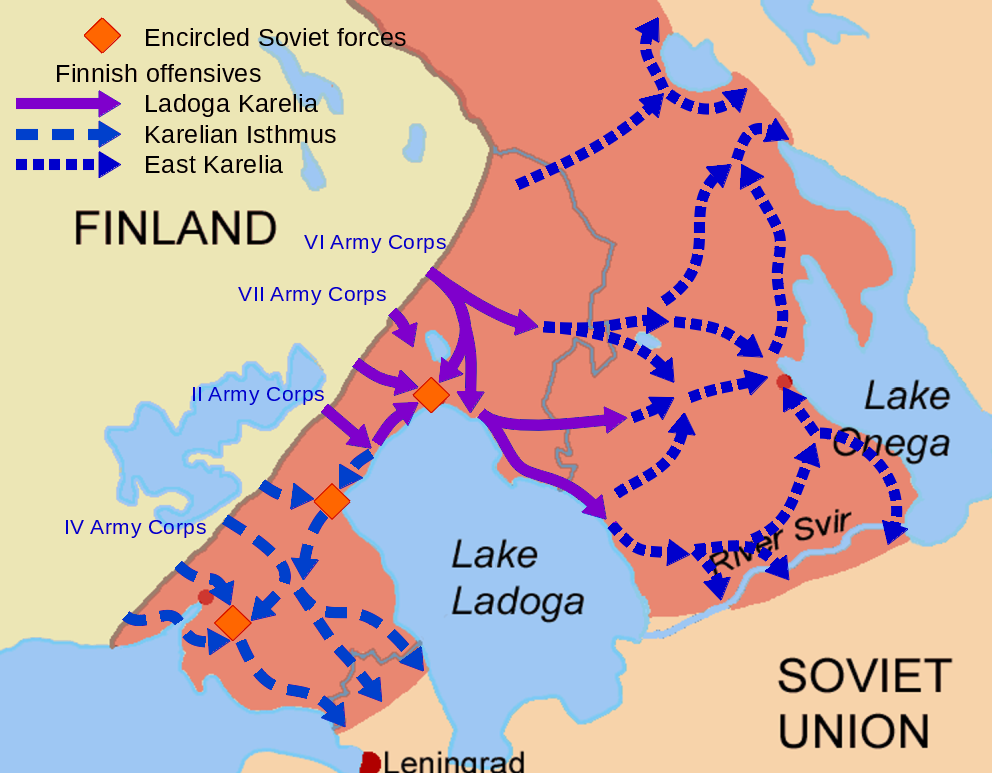
Finnish advance in Karelia. Note red diamond showing encircled 168th.

Finland declared war on the USSR on June 25, and by July 4 the 168th was defending against advancing elements of Hägglund's VII Corps. On July 16 Finnish forces broke through the defenses of 7th Army, liberated Impilahti and Pitkäranta, and cut off the division in much the same positions it had held in the "Great Motti". By the beginning of August it was administratively assigned to 19th Rifle Corps in Northern Front's 23rd Army. At this time of year no ice road was possible and it was desperately needed for the defense of Leningrad, so on August 21 it was evacuated by the Ladoga Flotilla to the area of the city. By the end of the month it had been assigned to 55th Army and took up positions south of the city.

== Siege of Leningrad ==
On August 25th the German XXXIX Motorized Corps and XXVIII Army Corps of 18th Army broke through the defenses of 48th Army and seized Lyuban. Popov's left flank was now in tatters with only the Krasnogvardeisk Fortified Zone remaining to defend the city. With the approval of the STAVKA he designated the western half of this as 55th Army, which was defending the Slutsk–Kolpinskii line with the newly arrived 168th plus four other divisions, although two of them were badly depleted. Between August 30 and September 8 the XXVIII Corps, supported by 12th Panzer Division, repeatedly struck the Army's defenses west of Tosno, southeast of Krasnogvardeisk, and the Neva River, slowly driving it back until reaching the Izhora River, where resistance stiffened and fighting continued for several days.

On the latter date the 20th Motorized Division reached Shlisselburg on Lake Ladoga and completed the encirclement of the city. 55th Army was now defending Slutsk–Kolpino Fortified District from Pustoshka to the Neva with the 90th, 70th, 168th, and 4th Leningrad Opolchenie Divisions deployed on the expected German axis of attack. Stalin, reacting with anger to the completion of the encirclement, appointed Army Gen. G. K. Zhukov to command of Leningrad Front on September 9. On September 12 the 168th brought the advance of XXVIII Corps on Slutsk and Fedorovskoye to a halt after only minimal gains. Through most of the rest of the month 18th Army focused on driving north to the coast of the Baltic Sea west of Leningrad which would put its forces in its southern outskirts. By the end of the month the division had fallen back to positions south of Kolpino.

=== First Sinyavino Offensive ===
On September 30, Army Group North ended its effort to take Leningrad directly, in part because its panzer divisions had been shifted south for Operation Typhoon. Zhukov was already directing an operation to break the blockade through a converging attack toward Sinyavino and Mga from inside by the Neva Operational Group and outside by 54th Army. 54th Army had begun its attack on September 10 but only gained 6-10km toward Sinyavino during 16 days of on-again, off-again fighting. Eventually the XXXIX Corps forced the Army back from even these modest gains. On October 12 and again on the 14th the STAVKA ordered Leningrad Front to renew the offensive. 55th Army was reorganized as the Eastern Sector Operational Group (ESOG) to attack across the Neva, advance on Sinyavino and link up with 54th Army along with the Neva Operational Group. Once this was achieved the three forces were to advance north to Shlisselburg and restore land communications.

The 168th was not originally part of ESOG, but instead was involved in battles of local importance during October 1-24 in the area of Putrolovo and the Pushinskii Sovkhoz. The Neva Group had already established a bridgehead on September 18 with the 115th Rifle Division and 4th Naval Infantry Brigade, and this would serve as the springboard for the offensive. The ESOG had nine rifle divisions, one rifle brigade, and four tank brigades, for a total of 71,270 men, 97 tanks (including 59 KV types), and 475 guns. It faced some 54,000 German troops in well-fortified positions flanked by swampy terrain and backed by 450 guns. At 2010 hours on October 19 two regiments of the 86th Rifle Division crossed into the so-called "Nevsky Pyatachok", some 2km in width and 500m-600m deep. These went over to the attack at 1000 on October 20 and despite heavy fire wedged into the defenses and entered hand-to-hand combat, expanding the bridgehead marginally. Beyond this the offensive made little progress on any front over the next three days.

==== The "Nevsky Pyatachok" ====
Bondarev received a warning order on October 24 to lead his division into the bridgehead at a future date. As with the 86th Division the 168th had to cross at night, as the entire bridgehead was under direct and indirect fire. It was concentrated in the village of Eksolovo, but the 412th Howitzer Artillery Regiment was delayed due to lack of fuel for its tractors. The first notable snow fell on October 27 as reconnaissance began for the coming breakout effort, and replacements were received on October 30 as training continued. On November 2 the 168th returned to the 8th Army. In the planning for the breakout the division was to initially capture strongholds in the Figurnaya grove and sand quarries. It would then advance in the direction of the Sinyavino Heights. Bondarev deployed the 402nd and 260th Rifle Regiments in first echelon and the 462nd Regiment in second. The artillery regiments would have to remain on the west bank due to the restricted size and the exposure within the bridgehead. In any case, artillery shells were in short supply within the blockade.

The crossing began on the night of November 2/3 and continued the next night. The first echelon, backed by minimal artillery fire and a single attack aircraft squadron, attacked on November 4 and took the first trench before stalling. A further effort the next day did nothing but increase the casualties. The 462nd was introduced to the fighting on November 6 but did no better, in part because artillery ammunition was now exhausted. Despite this, the commanders of Leningrad Front and 8th Army insisted that the attacks continue. Soon the regiments were forced to disband their 3rd Battalions in order to reinforce their 1st and 2nd Battalions. German counterattacks were now directed at the bridgehead, but these were held off. At around this time the 177th Division was also moved into the bridgehead, but it was quickly bled dry as well. Leningrad Front had formed a trio of "Shock Communist Regiments" from Party members and Komsomols, and one of these entered the bridgehead on November 9. It went on the offensive without any preparation and with very little support, "and did not advance a single step." Another such regiment followed on November 10/11, along with four tanks, and was also devastated by German fire despite what support the 168th and 177th could offer. The third Communist regiment repeated the exercise on November 12/13, with even greater support but with the same result. The remnants of the three regiments were now incorporated into the 168th.

==== Into the Oranienbaum Bridgehead ====
Bondarev left the division on November 18 to take command of 8th Army. After furthering his education he was promoted to the rank of lieutenant general on April 28, 1943, commanding the 17th Guards Rifle Corps and the 101st Rifle Corps in the final years of the war after being made a Hero of the Soviet Union on October 16, 1943. He was replaced by Maj. Gen. Pantelemon Aleksandrovich Zaitsev, who had most recently led the 13th Rifle Division. Bondarev was not a "new broom" in his Army command and he was compelled by the Front command to continue the futile offensive, with minimal reinforcements, into December. On December 28 the remnants of the 168th had been removed to direct command of the Front, and loaded onto trains to move west and north via Leningrad. It then moved across the frozen Gulf of Finland to Kronstadt and then into the Oranienbaum bridgehead west of the city. By January 14 it joined the Front's Coastal Operational Group, where it would remain until January 1044. The 260th Regiment would be detached to the defenses of Kronstadt in February. General Zaitsev left the division on January 24 to take deputy command of 55th Army. He would later lead a pair of rifle corps before being killed in action on March 1, 1944. The division would led by Lt. Col. Semyon Nikolaevich Boritsov until he was replaced on February 25 by Col. Aleksandr Aleksandrovich Egorov. This officer had been serving a chief of staff of 48th Rifle Division and would be promoted to major general on September 25, 1943.

== Leningrad-Novgorod Offensive ==
In October 1943 the 168th was assigned to 43rd Rifle Corps, still in the Coastal Operational Group, but the Group was soon disbanded and the division was reassigned to 2nd Shock Army. Prior to the start of the offensive it joined the Army's 122nd Rifle Corps, which was under command of General Zaitsev.

=== Krasnoye Selo-Ropsha Offensive ===
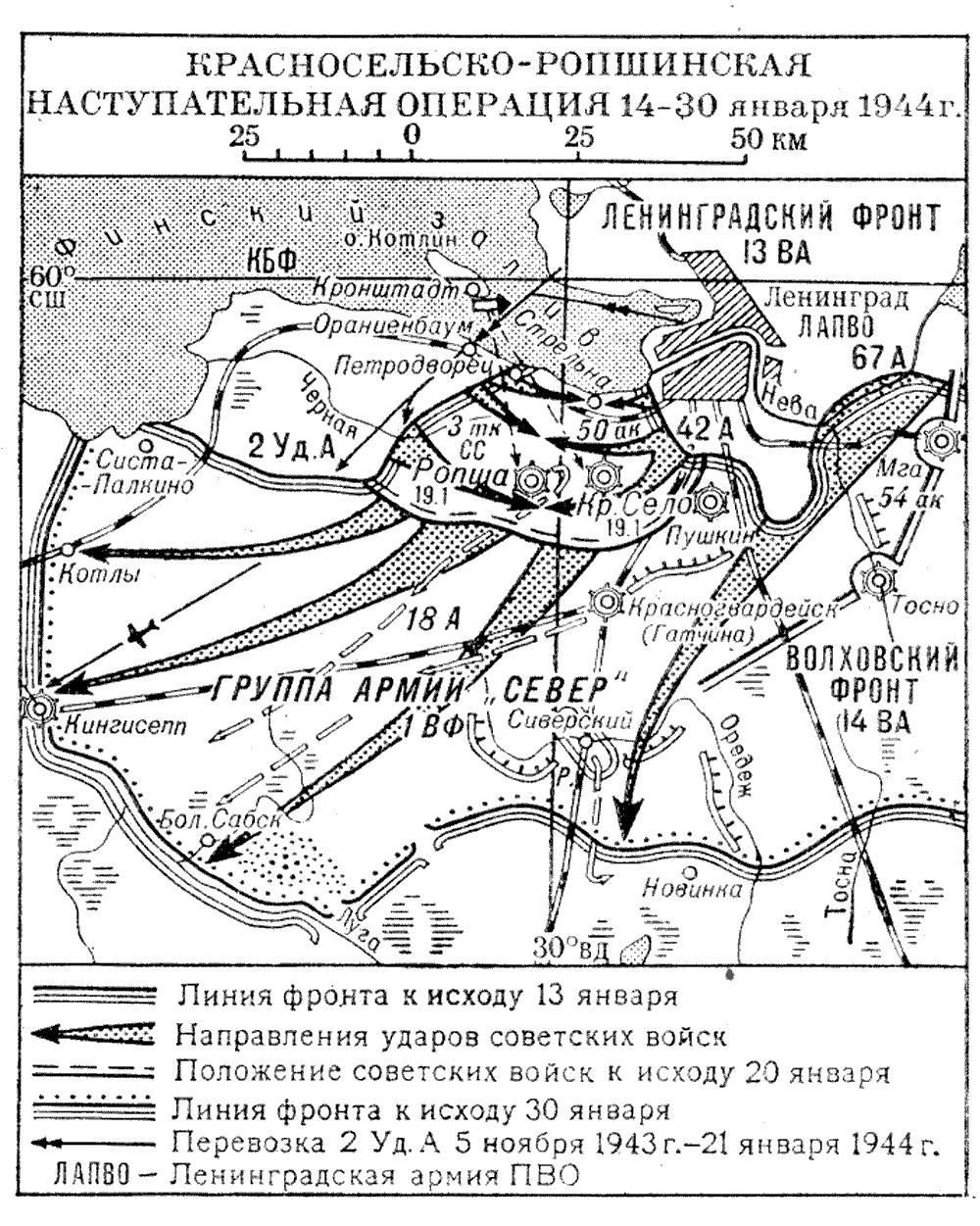
Soviet-era map of the offensive

The commander of Leningrad Front, Army Gen. L. A. Govorov, planned to have 2nd Shock and 42nd Armies break through the German lines they faced and then link up at Ropsha, cutting off the German forces between that place and the Gulf of Finland. This would also reestablish land communications with Oranienbaum. 2nd Shock was led by Lt. Gen. I. I. Fediuninskii, and he placed his 122nd Corps in first echelon of the attack, although the 168th was in its Corps' second echelon.

The offensive began at dawn on January 14, 1944, with a massive artillery preparation of 104,000 shells over 65 minutes against the positions of the 9th and 10th Luftwaffe Field Divisions. Despite extensive fortifications built since 1941 the massed Soviet riflemen, assisted by tanks, soon overcame the forward defenses and by day's end had gained up to 3km on a 10km-wide front. The advance continued overnight as the lead divisions pushed forward another 4km, and the next day shattered what was left of 10th Luftwaffe Division, while the 168th was committed from second echelon. 2nd Shock was finally halted by heavy fire west of Ropsha. 42nd Army also made good progress from its side on the first two days.

January 16 saw the battle develop with greater fury and during its course Fediuninskii's forces completed the penetration of the main defensive belt. He now formed a small mobile group from a tank brigade, a self-propelled artillery regiment, a battalion of infantry in trucks, an artillery battalion, and other units with orders to take Ropsha at all cost. Counterattacks brought this to a halt halfway to the objective. While the German High Command debated the retreat of 18th Army the entire 2nd Shock Army surged ahead on January 18 and the 122nd Corps took Ropsha the next day. The same day, at 2100 hours the 462nd Rifle Regiment linked up with the 54th Engineer Battalion of 42nd Army's mobile group just south of Ropsha. The 168th was now under 108th Rifle Corps, which had previously been in Front reserve. On the morning of January 20 the two Armies met all along their fronts, closing the door behind the German grouping to the north.

The next objective, apart from mopping up the encircled German forces, was to advance in the direction of Luga. This would involve 42nd Army capturing Krasnogvardeisk and 2nd Shock protecting its right flank. By January 24 the Army was advancing along the Krasnogvardeisk–Kingisepp railroad, but only made modest gains against stiffening resistance. Govorov now regrouped his forces. Among other moves the 108th Corps was made part of 42nd Army. During the next two days the 108th and 122nd Corps jointly captured Elizavetino. Unbeknown to Hitler, the chief of staff of Army Group North ordered the overdue withdrawal to begin overnight on January 27/28. At about this time the 168th was transferred to 123rd Rifle Corps, still in 42nd Army.

Taking advantage of the withdrawal the 123rd and 117th Rifle Corps forced a German grouping back toward Krasnogvardeisk against weakening resistance. Over the next few days 42nd Army took an important German supply base at Volosovo, and after an advance of 50km reached the Luga River on January 30. It was only now that Hitler authorized the withdrawal to the defense line based on this river. The next objective of 2nd Shock and 42nd Armies was the city of Narva, which formed the northern linchpin of the Panther line. 42nd Army crossed the frozen river on January 31 and began a pursuit of the L Army Corps south and southwestward along the Kingisepp–Narva and Siverskii–Luga roads. Against minimal resistance the Army, which had organized forward detachments, was covering 15km-20km per day. On February 4 the 86th Rifle Division of 123rd Corps liberated Lyady on the Plyussa River while the Corps' 46th Rifle Division wiped out an encircled garrison at Sara-Gora. The Army now took a two day halt to bring up artillery and supplies.

=== To the Panther Line ===
On February 7 the Army fought a meeting engagement with elements of Army Group North attempting to take up positions for a counterattack southwest of Luga and east of Lake Peipus. The Army advanced to the south in a single echelon from west of the Plyussa to the east bank of the lake. Following the halt 116th and 123rd Corps prepared to assault southeastward toward the Luga–Pskov railroad but their advance on February 9 ran into the German counterattack force, most of which had not yet reached its designated positions. Later, on February 10 the 12th Panzer Division began a planned counterattack and ran directly into the 196th and 128th Rifle Divisions of 116th Corps and the 168th, which were attempting to encircle German forces defending Iamm Station from the east. Although the panzers managed to halt the 128th, they were themselves halted, which brought Army Group North's overall counterstrike to a conclusion.

With the failure of this attack, 18th Army was ordered to abandon Luga, which took place on February 12. The Army was now directed to commence a general withdrawal to the Panther Line, which was to be complete by March 1. The commander of 42nd Army, Col. Gen. I. I. Maslennikov, ordered the 123rd and 116th Corps to continue their attack to the south and southeast to finally cut the Luga–Pskov railroad. Although the two Corps managed to capture Shchir and reach the outskirts of Plyussa they were unable to overcome German resistance and capture the latter place or Strugi Krasnye. 18th Army was able to use the railroad for its withdrawal in relative safety. The 123rd and 108th Corps now drove down the east shore of Lake Peipus toward Pskov. By the end of February many of the Front's rifle divisions had been reduced by 2,500 to 3,500 men each. On March 2, Govorov ordered his 42nd and 67th Armies to "liberate Pskov and Ostrov no later than 10 March and then force the Velikaia River." Sources differ as to the length of this fighting, which may have continued into early April, but the defenses of the Panther Line were not significantly breached.

During March the 168th, along with 123rd Corps, was transferred to 67th Army, and when this Army was moved to 3rd Baltic Front in April the division also moved, now to 110th Rifle Corps. The 168th would remain under this Corps almost continually for the duration of the war. On May 30 General Egorov left the division to take command of the 119th Rifle Corps. He was replaced by Col. Pyotr Ivanovich Olkhovskii, who had most recently led the 225th Rifle Division. He would be promoted to major general on April 20, 1945 and would lead the division into the postwar.

== Vyborg-Petrozavodsk Offensive ==
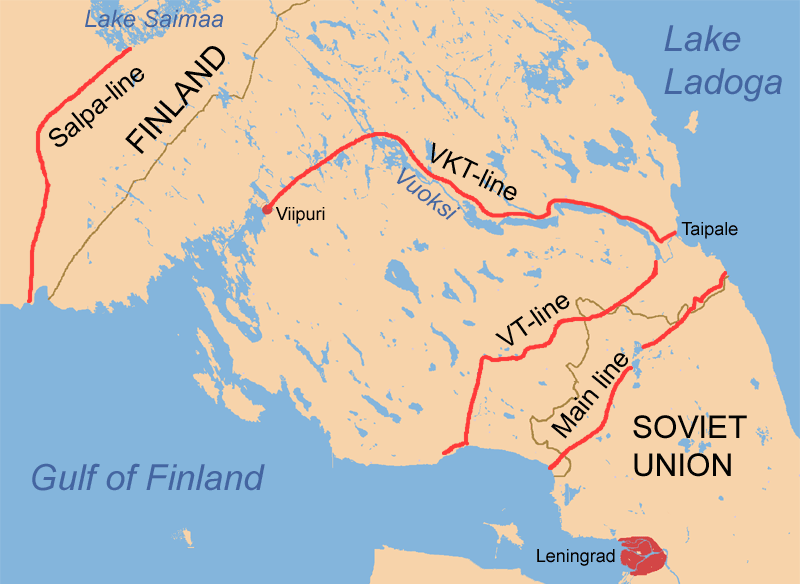
Map showing the four main defence lines built by Finland; Main line, VT-line, VKT-line and the Salpa-line. The Soviet offensive was stopped at the VKT-line.

The victory against German 18th Army left Finland still in control of the territory in the Karelian Isthmus it had retaken in 1941. The STAVKA, now with an abundance of resources, set a priority on defeating the Finnish forces, reoccupying the Isthmus, possibly occupying Helsinki, but in any case driving Finland out of the war. The USSR officially published its peace terms on February 28, but these were rejected on March 8. Although negotiations continued, the STAVKA began planning for operations in May. On June 1 the 110th Corps was transferred back to Leningrad Front, joining 21st Army.

The commander of this Army, Lt. Gen. D. N. Gusev (as of June 18 Col. Gen.) had three rifle Corps in first echelon and would conduct the main attack on a front from northwest of Sestroretsk facing the Finnish III and IV Army Corps. As the 110th and 108th Rifle Corps were just arriving they were added to the Army's substantial reserve. The lead Corps were assigned a breakthrough sector from Hill 107.4 to the shore of the Gulf of Finland. Gusev opened with a reconnaissance-in-force at 1800 hours on June 9 following a 15-minute artillery preparation to uncover, as far as possible, the Finnish fire plan. The main offensive began the following day at 0820 hours after the Finnish defenses had been battered by artillery for 140 minutes. During the day the 30th Guards Rifle Corps made the greatest progress, advancing up to 15km into the defenses and capturing strongpoints at Mainila and Staryi Beloostrov. The Finnish command was now convinced it could not successfully hold anywhere in front of their second defensive line, and this retrograde began almost immediately.

During the first three days of the offensive toward Vyborg the 21st and 23rd Armies advanced to the second line on a 60km-wide front but came to an abrupt halt in the face on increasing resistance and counterattacks. Govorov quickly realized this would not be taken easily and now paused to regroup for a formal penetration operation, bringing up all heavy artillery and additional forces. Late on June 12, seeing that the Finns had concentrated their arriving reinforcements on the sector astride the Vyborg road facing 30th Guards Corps, he shifted his attack axis to the coastal sector on 21st Army's left flank and reinforced it with the 110th Corps. Gusev would first strike with the 108th and 109th Corps toward Summa and only afterward commit the 110th; the intention was to prevent the withdrawal of IV Corps. It was intended to capture Vyborg during June 18-20.

=== Advance on Vyborg ===
By the "white night" of June 13/14 Gusev had concentrated 1,744 guns and mortars on a 20km-wide attack sector. These guns fired a 90-minute preparation which was added to by the guns of the Baltic Fleet on the coastal sector. The 108th and 109th Corps began the ground attack at 0930 hours and by 1800 two divisions of the latter, with armor support, had captured several Finnish strongpoints. By early on June 16 the two Armies had penetrated to a depth of 40km on a front of 75km in heavier fighting than had been anticipated. Gusev now committed the 110th Corps to reinforce the attack along the Uusikirkko axis. Advancing abreast his three Corps (30th Guards had been withdrawn for replenishment) covered 6-15km, reaching positions from Perkjärvi Station to Sortavala by the end of the day, despite poor weather cancelling most air support. This progress was less than Govorov had expected and he issued orders for a more "energetic" pursuit on June 17. This involved the formation of forward detachments of motorized infantry with armor and artillery support. On the same evening the two Finnish corps were ordered to fall back to the VKT Line.

21st Army advanced 10-14km along the Vyborg axis on June 17. 110th Corps reached Lake Mikkelin-jarvi, Loistova, Varpulila and Pikhkala, and by day's end its left flank divisions and the entire 109th Corps had reached the third defensive belt. The following day the remainder of the 110th, with the assistance of the 1st and 152nd Tank Brigades, had reached positions south of Summa and Leypyasuo, while the 108th Corps, advancing along the coast, penetrated the belt, covered 25km, and took the port town of Koivisto. At this point Gusev brought up the 97th Rifle Corps from second echelon, attached the two tank corps, and gave orders to push through the belt between Summa and Markki and advance along the Summa–Vyborg road. Meanwhile, 110th Corps was to cover the 97th's left flank while penetrating the boundary between the 3rd Infantry Brigade and 10th Infantry Division before attacking north along the Iokhannes road to prevent a Finnish withdrawal along the coastal route. Following this the Corps was to push northward to take Limatta Station and Khuvila before taking Vyborg itself.

The attack was renewed early on June 19 and was almost immediately successful. A 70km-wide gap was torn in the defense between Muolaa and the Gulf of Finland. This was followed by an advance of some 14km in 18 hours of fighting against stiff resistance; 110th Corps reached Kakinsari. Just as Govorov's forces were preparing to complete the destruction of the two Finnish corps they were ordered to withdraw to avoid complete destruction. 10th Infantry and Lagus Armored Divisions were to take up reserve positions northwest of Vyborg, although the rapid penetration of 21st Army disrupted this move to some extent. Finnish V Army Corps had been transferred from the Onega-Lagoda sector took up a defense from Vyborg Bay to the Vuoksi River along with IV Corps. While the defensive position was strong, most of the Finnish forces were badly depleted.

Overnight, Govorov ordered the 21st and 23rd Armies to:

destroy the enemy Vyborg grouping and capture Vyborg no later than 20 June by developing the attack to the northwest. Reach the Antrea and Vyborg line with the [armies'] main forces no later than 21 June while reliably protecting the shock grouping's flank and rear...

110th Corps was pulled back to second echelon as part of the regular rotation Gusev had adopted. The assault began early on June 20 but the attackers soon found that the city had been abandoned overnight, and it was occupied by 1900 hours. By this time the rifle divisions of 21st Army had been reduced to from 4,000 to 6,500 personnel each.

=== Into Finland ===
The next day Govorov, just raised to the rank of marshal, submitted his new plan for continued operations into Finland. 21st and the newly-arrived 59th Army would make the main attack toward Lappeenranta and then wheel to the west to reach the line from that place to Surpiala. The first stage would last from June 22-24. Gusev would attack along the coastal axis with 110th and 108th Corps, plus 30th Guards Corps which was now released from Front reserves. In the event, due to a regrouping, four Corps were put in first echelon and 30th Guards in immediate reserve; 110th Corps was inland from 108th Corps on the coast. The overall attack front was 30km wide from the Gulf of Vyborg to south of Repola. The advance kicked off early on June 22 as planned. the 110th and 97th Corps, sharing the center of the shock grouping, penetrated about 2km into the defenses at the junction of IV and V Corps. Repeated assaults, soon assisted by 108th Corps and 109th Corps on the right, forced the Finns to pull back to new defenses anchored on the strongpoint at Repola by the end of June 24. This did not represent a decisive penetration, and after consultation with the STAVKA, Govorov altered his plan. 59th Army was to conduct an amphibious assault across the Gulf of Vyborg to outflank the defenses from the west, while 30th Guards Corps was finally brought into Gusev's first echelon.

The offensive was renewed on June 25 by three Corps, including the 110th, following another massive artillery preparation, and managed to advance 5km in 24 hours of heavy fighting. The Finns were now defending the positions they had constructed in 1940-41 between the Winter War and the Continuation War, and their forces had been further reinforced. Elements of the shock grouping approached the strongpoint of Portinkhaika late the next day. Despite this the Finns were able to seal off and contain the penetration after four more days of battle. By June 30 Gusev's forces had captured Portinkhaika and reached the outskirts of Ihantala, where better tank country could be found, but this still amounted to just 8-10km in 10 days of heavy fighting. 21st Army continued the attack through early July but made no notable gains, On July 12 Gusev was ordered to go over to the defense effective two days later.

== Into the Baltic States ==
By the beginning of August the 168th, along with the remainder of 110th Corps was under direct command of Leningrad Front, and later in the month it returned to 42nd Army, which was now under 2nd Baltic Front. As of the first week of the month the division was marching west in the direction of Pustoshka. By the second week of September it was located near Krustpils in central Latvia, advancint to the west toward Riga. Later in the month 42nd Army was diverted northward and by early October the 168th was located east of Valmiera. 42nd Army took part in the capture of the Latvian capital and the division won a battle honor:

RIGA... 168th Rifle Division (Colonel Olkhovskii, Pyotr Ivanovich)... The troops who participated in the liberation of Riga, by the order of the Supreme High Command of 13 October 1944, and a commendation in Moscow, are given a salute of 24 artillery salvoes from 324 guns.

=== Courland Pocket ===
Shortly after the taking of Riga the remaining forces of Army Group North (later Army Group Courland) were again isolated in the Courland Peninsula of Latvia. 2nd Baltic Front was tasked with maintaining the blockade and reduction of these forces. In December the 168th was briefly moved to 22nd Army, under direct Army command, but in January 1945 it returned to 110th Corps in 42nd Army. In March the Front was disbanded and 110th Corps came under the 10th Guards Army of Leningrad Front's Kurland Group of Forces. On April 22 the division was removed to the Reserve of the Supreme High Command where it was assigned to 83rd Rifle Corps of 22nd Army. It remained under these commands until January 1946.
