= Aarne Juutilainen =

Finnish army captain (1904–1976)

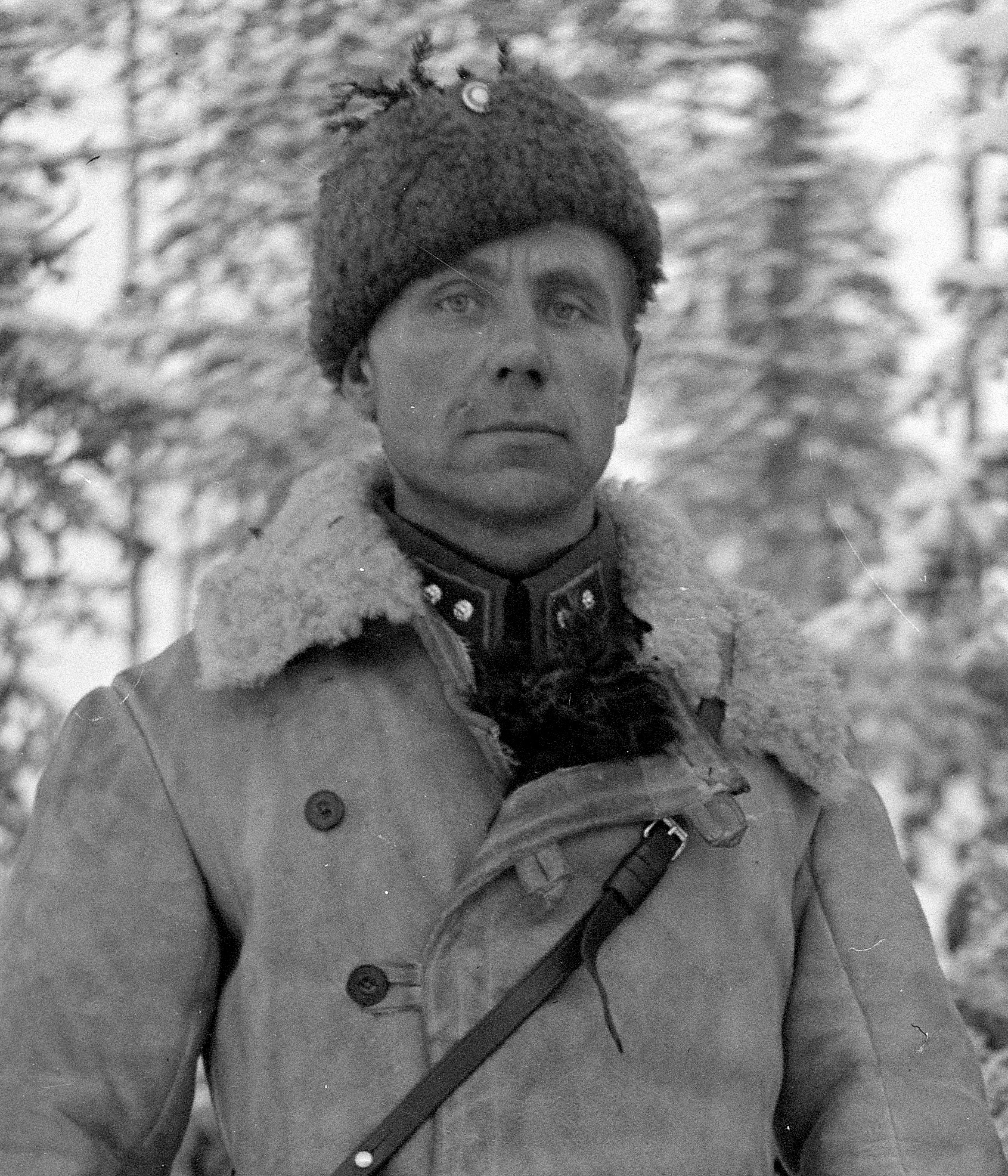
- Juutilainen in December 1939
- Born: Aarne Edward Juutilainen; 18 October 1904; Sortavala, Grand Duchy of Finland, Russian Empire
- Died: 28 October 1976 (aged 72); Helsinki, Finland
- Relatives: Tuomas Juutilainen (father); Helmi Kauppinen (mother); Helvi Hovi (wife); Erkki Juutilainen (son); Ilmari Juutilainen (brother); Olavi Juutilainen (nephew)
- Military career
- Allegiance: White Finland (1918); French Foreign Legion (1930–1935); Finland (1925–1928, 1935–1944)
- Branch: Army
- Rank: Captain (Finland)
- Nickname: Marokon kauhu (The Terror of Morocco)
- Commands: The "Moroccan company"
- Conflicts: Finnish Civil War; French conquest of Morocco; World War II; Winter War; Battle of Kollaa; Continuation War; Lapland War

Aarne Edward Juutilainen (Finnish: [ˈɑːrne ˈjuːtilɑi̯nen]; 18 October 1904 - 28 October 1976), nicknamed "Marokon kauhu" (English: The Terror of Morocco), was a Finnish army captain who served in the French Foreign Legion in Morocco between 1930 and 1935. After returning to Finland, he served in the Finnish army and became a national hero in the Battle of Kollaa during the Winter War with the Soviet Union; with his relentless fighting spirit, he rose to legendary status on the war front. He was wounded three times during World War II.

== Early life ==
Juutilainen was born in Sortavala on 18 October 1904. His parents were railway clerk Tuomas Juutilainen and Helmi Sofia Juutilainen née Kauppinen. His brother was Ilmari Juutilainen, later better known as a flying ace during the wars.

Juutilainen attended school in Sortavala, where he read seven classes at Sortavala Lyceum. He was athletic, and enjoyed skiing, horseback riding, fencing and pesäpallo; he was a member of the Sortavalan Viritys pesäpallo team in 1924.

As a young boy he had his first contact with war in 1918, participating in the Finnish Civil War by loading machine gun belts on the white side. After the war Juutilainen tried to volunteer for the Aunus expedition, but the recruiters found that Juutilainen was underage and had forged his parents' consent to the expedition. Nevertheless, Juutilainen decided to choose a military career as his profession. He attended the Reserve Officer School in 1925 and continued his studies at the Cadet School in 1926–1927. He dropped out of school and resigned from the Finnish Army in 1928.

== Military career ==
=== French Foreign Legion ===
On 20 June 1930, Juutilainen travelled to France and joined the French Foreign Legion. He was transferred to Fort St. Nicolas in Southern France, near Marseille, and from there to Oran in Algeria. He spent time in a Foreign Legion training camp in the town of Sidi Bel Abbès. From there he was transferred to Fez and fought in several battles against the Berber rebels in the Atlas Mountains. It was during his service in Morocco that he was given the nickname "The Terror of Morocco" by Finnish troops.

The war in the Atlas Mountains was long, and in 1931 the Berbers surrendered. Juutilainen served in the Foreign Legion for a full five years and was rewarded with the Legion Cross and French citizenship. He returned to Finland on 20 June 1935, by which time the southern part of Morocco was under French protectorate.

=== The Winter War ===
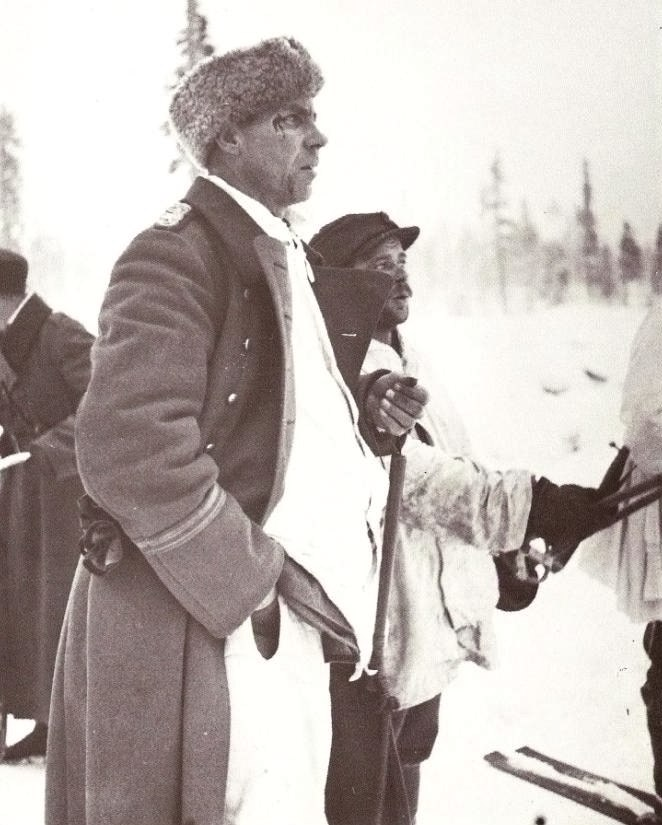
Captain Juutilainen at the front at Kollaa during the Winter War.

In November 1939, the Soviet Union attacked Finland, starting the Winter War. Juutilainen served in the Finnish army during this war, notably during the Battle of Kollaa.

Major General Woldemar Hägglund's question "Will Kollaa hold?" ("Kestääkö Kollaa?") was answered by Lieutenant Juutilainen: "Kollaa will hold, unless the orders are to run." ("Kyllä kestää, ellei käsketä karkuun juoksemaan.") During his command at Kollaa in December 1939, Juutilainen negotiated with Hägglund about the strategy for the Kollaa Front. The Battle of Kollaa was strategically important. "Unless we are told to run" meant exactly that; a week earlier, he had received a regimental order to withdraw, which he disregarded. Afterwards, Lieutenant-Colonel and regiment commander Wilhelm Teittinen, who commanded JR/34 at the Kollaa Front, honoured Juutilainen: "He created the Kollaa spirit". ("Hän loi Kollaan hengen")

By 1940, he was a captain commanding the "Moroccan company", a unit of "good shots and good skiers" who had all been decorated for bravery. A contemporary news report described the unit as having achieved "startling victories in this sector" during the war. Juutilainen's men called him "papa". He used the guerilla warfare skills he learned with the French Foreign Legion to train his men. By this time, Juutilainen had lost one finger of his right hand as a result of Russian shrapnel.

The 6th Company of Infantry Regiment 34, a unit led by Lieutenant Juutilainen, also included the military sniper Simo Häyhä, known as the "White Death."

=== The Continuation War ===
During the offensive phase of the Continuation War, Juutilainen served as company commander and battalion commander in Infantry Regiment 9. In Svir, he served as commander of Battle Group Juutilainen in Infantry Regiment 3. The future Commander of the Defense Forces, Yrjö Keinonen, also served as one of the company commanders in the battle group.

After the fiercest battles of the Continuation War in Gora in 1942, Juutilainen was transferred to the command of the JR 9 garrison, a position he served in during the period of trench warfare from 1942 to 1944. He served as the regimental commandant for more than a year before he was promoted to 7th Division commandant. He served as the division's commandant for a year. After that, before returning to the field army, Juutilainen served from May 1944 as commander of the 31st Prisoner of War Company. The transfer to that unit was due to "continued drunkenness and the beating of a man under his command in April 1944", according to the Punishment Diary of 7th Division officers; as he served as commandant of the division's headquarters, action and excitement were replaced by alcohol that was consumed in considerable quantities. He was known as a nervous and ferocious man and did not bow to anyone. He was even known to have shot at the foot of a subordinate when he gave impetus to his orders, but in the front line, he took care of his men, was fair and respected by his subordinates.

In the summer of 1944, Juutilainen once again took part in the fighting by directing a company in the direction of Loimola, and he was also there when the armistice was concluded at the beginning of September 1944.

=== The Lapland War ===
As the captain of the Lapland War, Aarne Juutilainen took part in the early stages of monitoring the retreat of the German XX Mountain Army together with his regiment, from which the reservists had already been repatriated. Juutilainen's battalion followed the fighting retreating Germans to Karesuvanto and still to Lätäseno until Captain Aarne Juutilainen received a notice that he would have to formally apply for resignation from the Finnish Defense Forces in December 1944.

== Later years and death ==
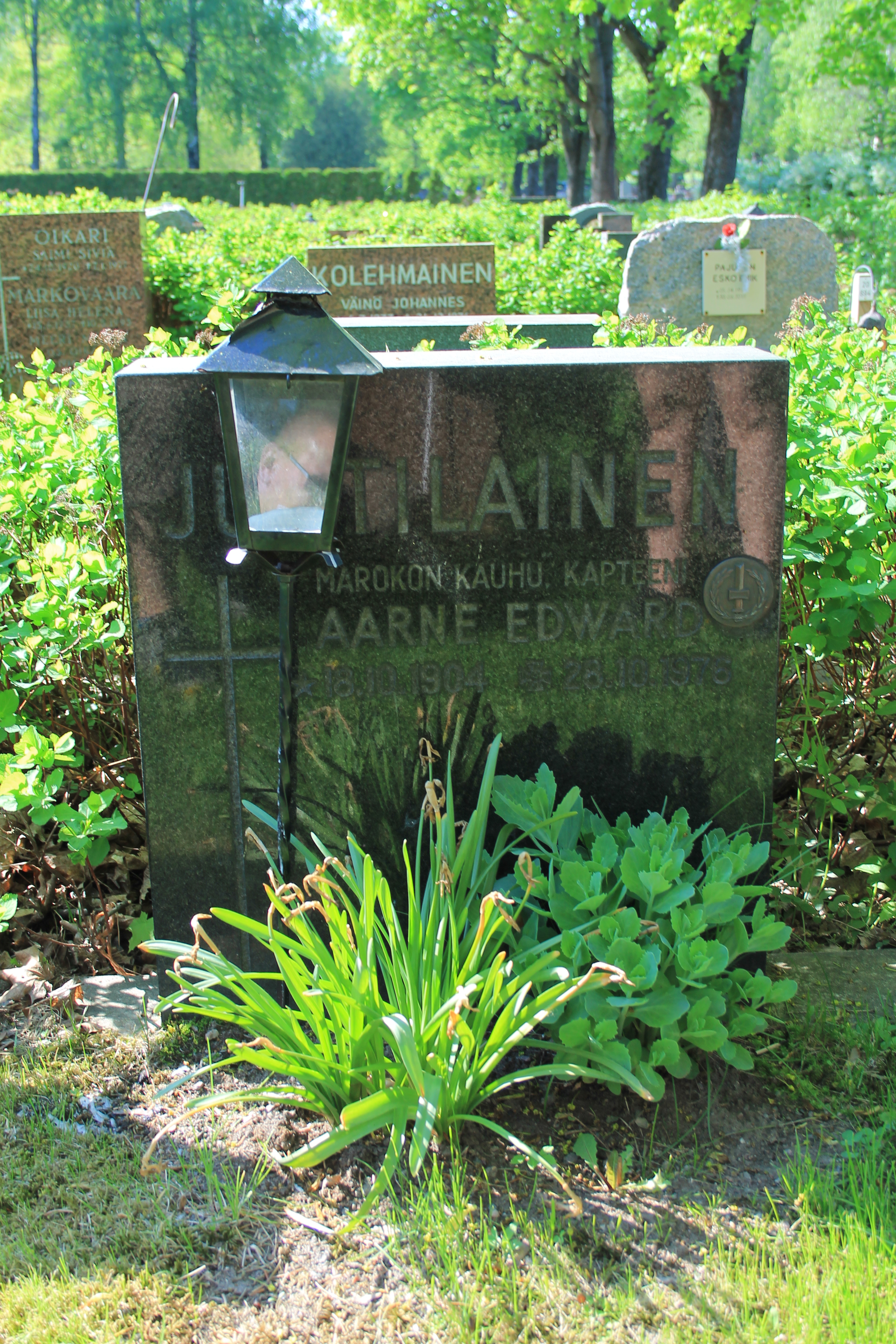
Grave of Aarne Juutilainen at Malmi Cemetery in Malmi, Helsinki

After the war, Juutilainen struggled with peacetime, eventually becoming an alcoholic. He settled in Helsinki and supported himself with miscellaneous work. Olavi Juutilainen, the son of his brother Ilmari Juutilainen, describes his uncle Aarne as follows:

Aarne was undeniably a fearless soldier, but a previously too romanticized image of him was painted. His conduct was inappropriate for the officer during both peace and war. He threatened and pointed at his own men with his pistol. As the men said, Aarne had a pistol more in his hand than in the case.––– My father was not exemplary in everything either. He betrayed my mother in public and later coveted alcohol as well. My parents divorced when I was 10 years old. However, Illu [Ilmari] was happy and funny, Aarne was a bad person. However, my father had some inexplicable grip on Aarne as he raged in his head. My father also guaranteed Aarne's debts.

Major Ahti Vuorensola, a brother-in-arms during the battle of Kollaa, helped Juutilainen as much as he could. Juutilainen died alone in a nursing home in Helsinki on 28 October 1976, at the age of 72. He was buried at the Malmi Cemetery.

== In popular culture ==
Juutilainen appears in the 2024 novel Les Guerriers de l'hiver by Olivier Norek, which is set during the Winter War. According to Norek, his grandfather and Juutilainen served at the same time in the French Foreign Legion in Morocco in the 1930s.

== See also ==
- List of Finnish soldiers
- French conquest of Morocco

== Bibliography ==
- Palolampi, Erkki (1942) [Originally published in Finland under the title Kollaa Kestää]. Der Winterfeldzug, Krieg in Finnlands Wäldern, 1939–1940 (in German). Berlin: A. Metzner. OCLC 20033401.
- Strout, Ben (director, writer); Poole, Kurt; Bowie, Michael; Lawrence, Jamie (actors) (1 February 2006). Fire and Ice: the Winter War of Finland and Russia (Television production). Indianapolis: MasterWork Media and WFYI. ASIN B000F9UEDY.
