= Lauri Tiainen =

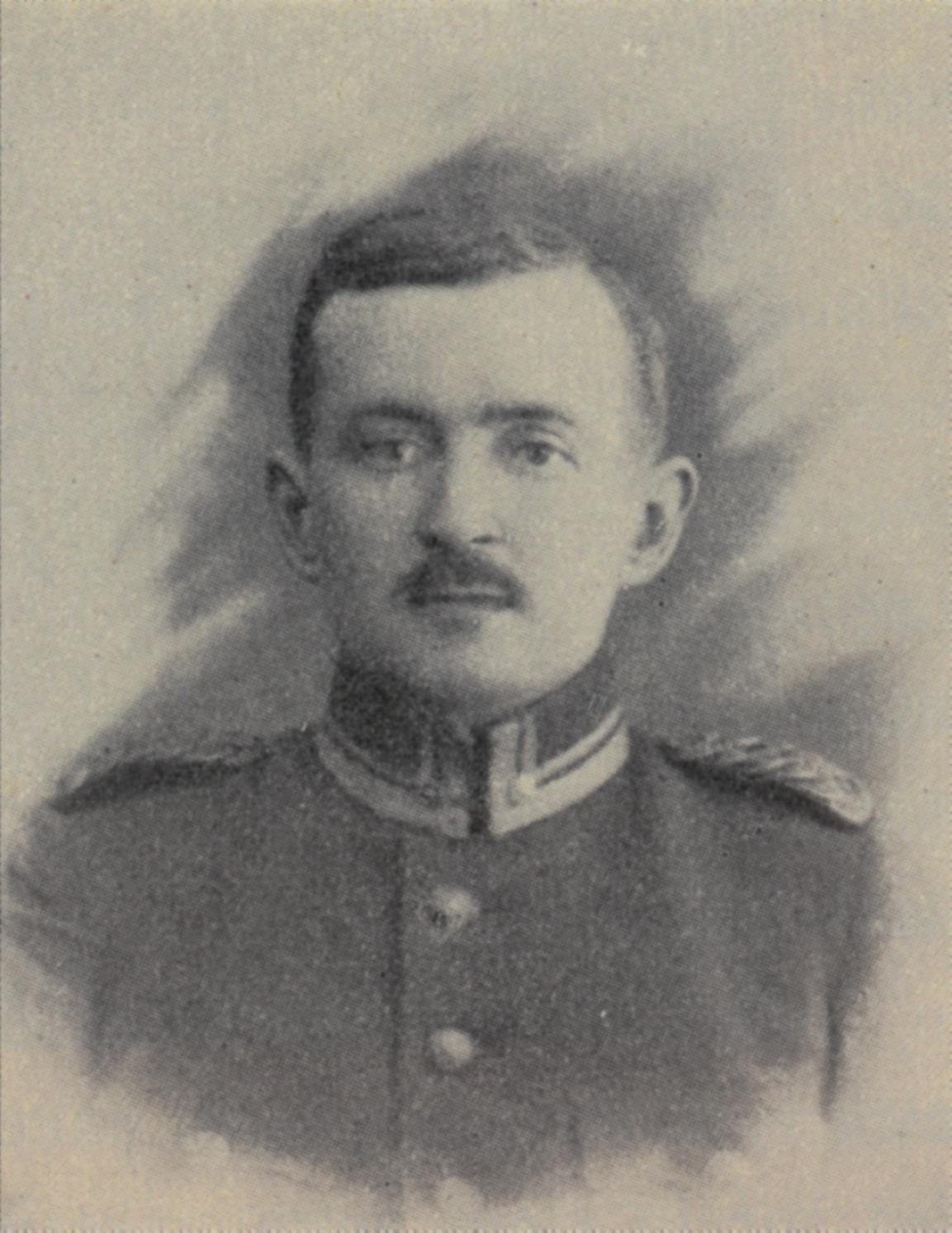
Lauri Tiainen

Lauri Taavetti Tiainen (15 February 1891, Rantasalmi – 18 September 1958) was a Finnish colonel during World War II.

Tiainen joined the Jaeger Movement in 1915 and trained and fought in the Royal Prussian 27th Jäger Battalion. He worked under the name "Pfadfinder". After the Finnish Civil War, Tiainen worked as a commander of a battalion, an army school lecturer, a commander of a regiment, and the commander of the Savo Brigade. In 1933, he was promoted to the Commander of Karelian Military Administrative Division.

Tiainen was the commander of the 12th Division in the Battle of Kollaa during the Winter War. Tiainen became ill at the end of January, and he had to leave the position on 31 January 1940. He was succeeded by Antero Svensson. During the rest of the war and in the Continuation War, Tiainen worked under the Home Front Cadre. He resigned in 1945.
