= Antero Svensson =

Finnish major general (1892–1946)

Antero Johannes Svensson
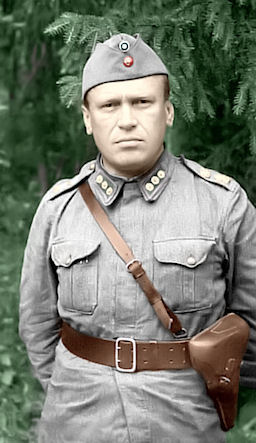
- Born: 30 November 1892; Raisio, Grand Duchy of Finland, Russian Empire
- Died: 26 April 1946 (aged 53) Helsinki, Finland
- Buried: Ahvenisto cemetery, Hämeenlinna
- Allegiance: German Empire (1916–1918); Finland (1918–1947)
- Branch: Imperial German Army; Finnish Jäger troops; Finnish Army
- Service years: 1916–1946
- Rank: Major General (1941)
- Commands: Karelian Guards Regiment (1937–39); 2nd Brigade (1939–40); 12th Division (1940); Savo–Karelia Military District (1940–41); 7th Division (1941–43); V Corps (1943–44); Light Brigade (1944–46)
- Conflicts: World War I; Finnish Civil War; Battle of Länkipohja; World War II; Winter War; Battle of Kollaa; Continuation War; Invasion of Ladoga Karelia; Invasion of East Karelia; Vyborg–Petrozavodsk offensive; Battle of Vyborg Bay
- Awards: Mannerheim Cross; Order of the Cross of Liberty; Order of the White Rose; Iron Cross; Order of the German Eagle; Order of the Cross of the Eagle; Legion of Honour; Order of Merit of the Kingdom of Hungary; Order of the Three Stars; Order of the Lithuanian Grand Duke Gediminas; Order of St. Olav; Order of Polonia Restituta; Cross of Merit (Poland); Order of the Crown; Order of the Sword; Order of the White Lion

Antero Johannes Svensson (30 November 1892 – 26 April 1946) was a Finnish major general, a member of the Jäger Movement and a recipient of the Mannerheim Cross. He participated in the Eastern Front of World War I as a volunteer of the 27th Royal Prussian Jäger Battalion, in the Finnish Civil War as a platoon and squadron commander, the Winter War as a brigade and division commander, and the Continuation War as a division and corps commander.

== Early life and Jäger Movement ==
Antero Johannes Svensson was born on 30 November 1892 in Raisio, Grand Duchy of Finland to Johan Alfred Svensson and Alma Sofia Granström, who owned a manor in the area. In 1915, he graduated as an ylioppilas from a lyceum in Turku, and enrolled in university studies the same year. While starting his studies, he became deeply involved in the Jäger Movement, where Finnish volunteers received military training in Germany, becoming a recruiter in the Turku and Rauma regions.

In November 1915, Svensson departed for Germany to undergo Jäger training himself. While in Germany, the Finnish volunteers formed the 27th Royal Prussian Jäger Battalion, fighting for the Imperial German Army on the Eastern Front of World War I. During this time, Svensson saw combat in several battles in the regions of Misa, Gulf of Riga and Lielupe.

== Return to Finland, 1918–1939 ==
Svensson returned to Finland on 25 February 1918, joining the Finnish Civil War on the side of the Whites. During the civil war, he first commanded a platoon of dragoons, later taking command of a squadron. In these roles, he took part in several battles in Länkipohja, Kuhmalahti, Laitikkala, Pälkäne and Vesilahti. In 1918, Svensson was commissioned as an officer of the Finnish Army.

Following the civil war Svensson studied in the Finnish War College, graduating in 1926. Following his graduation, he taught military history and strategy from 1927 to 1930. The next three years he served as Finnish military attaché to Poland, Czechoslovakia and Romania. Upon returning to Finland in 1933, he was made the chief of the Finnish General Staff department of statistics and foreign affairs (Finnish: tilasto- ja ulkomaanosasto), holding the position until 1937. In 1937, he was given command of the Karelian Guards Regiment.

In 1927, Svensson married Elna Mirjam Paasikallio. The couple had two children, Inga Mirjam Katarina Svensson (born 1928) and Leena Hannele Kristiina Svensson (later Hyvönen, born 1943).

== Winter War and Interim Peace, 1939–1941 ==
At the onset of the Finno-Soviet Winter War in November 1939, Svensson – by this point a colonel – was given command of the Finnish 2nd Brigade. The brigade was initially held in reserve of the 1st Division, building field fortifications, but participated in combat on the Karelian Isthmus from mid-December 1939 to January 1940. In January 1940, Svensson was given command of the 12th Division, responsible for the Kollaa region on the shore of Lake Ladoga. Following the end of the war in March 1940, Svensson was made commander of the Savo-Karelia Military District. He would keep the position for the duration of the Interim Peace.

== Continuation War 1941–1944 ==
In 1941, nine days after Germany had attacked the USSR, Finland began an operation to gain the lands ceded to the USSR in the peace treaty of 1940 that ended the Winter War. In September, this was achieved and the Finns continued over the old border with the USSR. In the lead-up to the war, Svensson was given command of the 7th Division. In August 1941, the Finnish high command created a new I Corps, to which the 7th Division was subordinated. The corps was tasked with the containment and destruction of the reinforced Soviet 168th Rifle Division surrounded in the area of Sortavala. The corps captured Sortavala, but failed to prevent parts of the 168th Division from escaping over Lake Ladoga. Svensson was promoted to major general in 1941.

Following the capture of Sortavala, Svensson was awarded with the Mannerheim Cross for his leadership. The 7th Division its advance into East Karelia, where it reached the Svir close to the shore of Lake Onega by October 1941. Following a series of Soviet attacks between December 1941 and April 1942, the Svir front stabilized into trench warfare.

In 1943, Svensson replaced Einar Mäkinen as the commander of the V Corps, to which the 7th Division had been subordinated in early 1942. Under Svensson's command, the 11th Division took part in the only notable Finnish offensive action of 1943, when parts of the 11th Division, supported by artillery from the 7th Division, captured a forward Soviet base consisting of some 20 dugouts.

=== On the Karelian Isthmus, 1944 ===
On 22 June 1944, during the Vyborg–Petrozavodsk offensive, Finnish forces to the west of Vuoksi on the Karelian Isthmus were divided between two corps. The western of these corps was formed around the V Corps headquarters – under the command of Svensson – and its corps-level assets. The corps consisted of the 10th and 17th infantry divisions, the Finnish Armoured Division and two brigades. The corps was also reinforced with the German 122nd Infantry Division in the first days of July.

Starting from the night of 30 June–1 July, the V Corps forces on the islands of the Vyborg Bay came under attack by the Soviet 59th Army, which was attempting to cross the bay. Following the capture of most of the islands in the bay, on 7 July the Soviets made multiple attempted battalion-sized landings on the Finnish side of the bay, but all attempts were repulsed by the V Corps. The attempts were renewed on 9 July, but these landings hit the sector of the German 122nd Infantry Division which had arrived on the bay on 8 July. Following the failed landings, the Soviet operation was halted, and the sector became largely passive to the end of the war.

== Death and legacy ==
Following the end of the Continuation War, Svensson was given command of the Light Brigade. Svensson died of heart attack on 26 April 1946 in Helsinki while visiting Hotel Torni, where the Allied Control Commission resided. He is buried in the Ahvenisto cemetery, in Hämeenlinna, where his grave marker is made from a stone anti-tank obstacle.

Svensson is known for having been present in the 1941 execution of two of his division's men, Voitto Ahomäki and Toivo Mäkelä, who had refused to return to the front. The execution inspired a similar scene in Väinö Linna's book The Unknown Soldier (Finnish: Tuntematon sotilas).

== Awards ==
During his life, Svensson was given several military awards. The most notable of these is the Finnish Mannerheim Cross. His other notable awards include the Finnish Order of the Cross of Liberty and Order of the White Rose; the German Iron Cross (both 1st and 2nd class) and Order of the German Eagle; the Estonian Order of the Cross of the Eagle; the French Officer of Legion of Honour; the Order of Merit of the Kingdom of Hungary; the Latvian Order of the Three Stars; the Lithuanian Order of the Lithuanian Grand Duke Gediminas; the Norwegian Order of St. Olav; the Polish Order of Polonia Restituta and Cross of Merit; the Romanian Order of the Crown; the Swedish Order of the Sword; and the Czechoslovak Order of the White Lion.
