= Woldemar Hägglund =

Finnish general

Johan Woldemar Hägglund
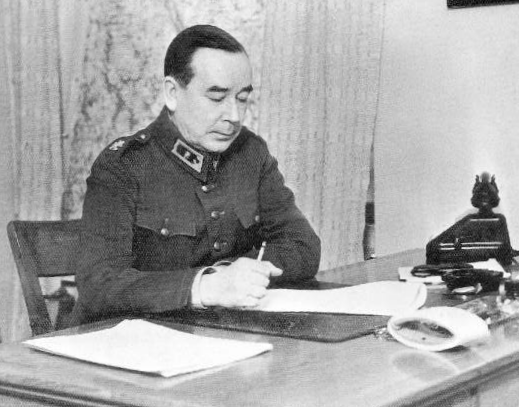
- Born: 10 August 1893; Helsinki, Grand Duchy of Finland, Russian Empire
- Died: 12 February 1963 (aged 69); Helsinki, Finland
- Military career
- Allegiance: German Empire (1915–1917); Finland (1917–1945)
- Branch: Imperial German Army; Finnish Jäger troops; Finnish Army
- Service years: 1915–1945
- Rank: Lieutenant general (1942)
- Commands: 2nd Division (1934–39); IV Corps (1939–41); VII Corps (1941–43)
- Conflicts: World War I; Finnish Civil War; Second World War; Winter War; Battle of Kollaa; Continuation War
- Awards: Grand Cross of the Order of the Lion of Finland; Order of the Cross of Liberty; Order of the White Rose of Finland; Order of the Cross of Vytis; Order of the Sword; Iron Cross; Order of the Dannebrog; Order of the Cross of the Eagle

Johan Woldemar Hägglund (August 10, 1893 – February 12, 1963) was a Finnish lieutenant general during the Second World War, and an early volunteer of the Jäger Movement. He participated in the Eastern Front of World War I, the Finnish Civil War, the Winter War and the Continuation War, commanding army corps in the latter two. In 1944 and 1945, he was in charge of a committee investigating Finnish war crimes, especially those committed against prisoners of war.

== Early years ==
Johan Woldemar Hägglund was born on 10 August 1893 in Helsinki to parents Johan Alfred Hägglund and Aleksandra Henriksson. He graduated as an ylioppilas in 1912 from a lyceum in Vyborg after which he studied civil engineering for four terms at the Helsinki University of Technology. During his studies, he worked as a train driver on the Vyborg-St. Petersburg railway.

During his studies, he became involved in the Finnish Jäger Movement, traveling to Germany in February 1915 to receive military training with other Finnish volunteers. During his time in Germany, Hägglund fought for the imperial German Army on the Eastern Front of World War I as a member of the 27th Royal Prussian Jäger Battalion, taking part in several battles in the regions of Misa, Gulf of Riga and Lielupe. He was promoted Hilfsgruppenführer (English: assistant squad leader) in 1915, followed by promotions to first Gruppenführer (English: squad leader) and later to Zugführer (English: platoon leader) in 1916.

== Civil war ==
In August 1917, Hägglund traveled to Sweden where he was involved in the planning of a future war of independence. The planning effort was led by Nikolaj Mexmontan, who had been the last commander of the Finnish Guard prior to its dissolution in 1905. He had traveled to Sweden for discussions with envoys of the German General Staff. The Germans had proposed an insurgency plan, where the first step was the insertion of a small team of Finnish volunteers by submarine to cut railway connections on the Karelian Isthmus. This was to take place on 11 August 1917 in preparation for the landing of the bulk of the Finnish Jägers in mid-September. The Finns, however, were unable to agree to these plans because they did not involve active German military participation. As such, the plans were cancelled in early August, and Hägglund returned to Germany in September.

Following the October Revolution, on 17 November 1917 an 8-man team of Finnish Jäger movement members under the command of Hägglund was inserted by the German submarine UC-57 to Pernå. Equipped with small arms, explosives and communications equipment, the team moved to Vyborg, where they stashed the materiel intended for railway sabotage.

In Vyborg, Hägglund took command of the Vyborg White Guard. As the escalation towards the Finnish Civil War continued in January 1918, he began the establishment of a Karelian Front. He was soon after replaced by Aarne Sihvo, under whom Hägglund continued as the chief of staff of Army Corps Karelia (Finnish: Karjalan armeijakunta). That same year, he received a sequence of promotions, ending the year as a lieutenant colonel.

== Interwar period ==
Following the end of the civil war in 1918, Hägglund was posted as the chief of staff of the 3rd Division and from 1920 into 1921 he was a regimental deputy commander in Keski-Suomen Rykmentti. He was posted as the chief of staff of the 2nd Division from 1921 to 1922, after which he returned to Keski-Suomen Rykmentti, commanding it until 1923 when he transferred to the Finnish Ministry of Defense. While in command of Keski-Suomen Rykmentti, Hägglund was supportive of the regimental Master Armorer Aimo Lahti, who had begun to plan an improved version of the German MP 18 submachine gun. Despite initial lukewarm reception by high ranking army officials, Lahti would go on to develop several influential Finnish firearms such as the Suomi KP/-31 submachine gun.

In 1926, Hägglund was promoted colonel and took command of the Helsinki White Guard. Between 1932 and 1934 he commanded first the Uusimaa Military District and then the Savo Military District, before being made the commander of the 2nd Division in 1934. During this posting, he attended the Swedish Military Academy and was promoted general major in 1936.

In 1920, Hägglund married Anna-Lisa Alleen, with whom he had three children. His youngest son Gustav Hägglund (born 1938) later became a general and Chief of Defence. During the 1920s and 1930s, Hägglund also wrote and contributed to several books about the Finnish Civil War.

== Second World War ==
Following the start of the Finno-Soviet Winter War in late 1939, Hägglund was given command of the IV Corps on 4 December 1939. The corps was on the northern shore of Lake Ladoga, and consisted of two understrength divisions and three separate battalion-sized formations. By 7 December, his forces had retreated to Kollaa, where they began the Battle of Kollaa which lasted to the end of the Winter War.

During the heavy fighting, Hägglund asked lieutenant Aarne Juutilainen Will Kollaa hold? (Finnish: Kestääkö Kollaa?), to which he received the reply Kollaa will hold, unless we are told to run! This exchange was widely reported and the shortened phrase Kollaa kestää! (English: Kollaa holds) became a lasting part of the Finnish lexicon. According to Nenye, Munter, Wirtanen and Birks, Hägglund's actions in the Winter War also "introduced the word motti into military jargon", even if he himself is not credited with coming up with the term.

Following a 15-month period of peace known as the Interim Peace, the Finnish Army mobilized on 10 June 1941 in preparation for the Continuation War, the Finnish component of the German invasion of the Soviet Union. Hägglund's IV Corps was renamed VII Corps, and consisted first of the 11th, 7th and 14th divisions. During a reorganization of the Finnish forces prior to the onset of hostilities, the corps was moved to the southern flank of the Army of Karelia into a region spanning from the line Onkamo-Vyartsilya in the north to Pyhäjärvi in the south and now consisted of the 19th and 7th Divisions. The corps was ordered to push the enemy on its sector toward either Lake Ladoga or Jänisjoki. Concurrently, other forces of the Army of Karelia would attack to the north of Lake Yanisyarvi before turning south. Together, these two movements would trap enemy formations on the isthmus between Lake Ladoga and Lake Yanisyarvi. The attack would then continue to the Svir and Lake Onega. Hostilities began with an artillery preparation on 9 July at 23:40, with the Finnish infantry pushing off 28 minutes later. The planned envelopment was completed in the morning of 15 July, and split in two the Soviet 7th Army, with parts of the 168th and 71st Divisions being cut off north of Lake Ladoga.

In 1942, Hägglund was promoted lieutenant general and from 1943 to 1944 he acted as an inspector general for the Finnish commander-in-chief. During this time, he was also in charge of secret preparations to prevent a potential German attempt to replace the Finnish political leadership. In 1944 he became first the chief of the Fortifications Planning Command (Finnish: Linnoitussuunnitteluesikunta) and later the chief of the Finnish Committee for Investigation of Prisoner-of-War Camps (Finnish: Sotavankileirien Tutkimuskeskus). The latter investigated Finnish war crimes, especially those committed against prisoners-of-war. Hägglund held the position until 27 January 1945, when he retired from active duty and was moved to the reserve.

== Death and legacy ==
Hägglund died on 12 February 1963 in Helsinki.

During his life, Hägglund was given several notable awards. These include the Finnish Grand Cross of the Order of the Lion of Finland, Order of the Cross of Liberty, Order of the White Rose of Finland; the Lithuanian Order of the Cross of Vytis; the Swedish Order of the Sword; multiple German and Prussian Iron Crosses; the Danish Order of the Dannebrog; and the Estonian Order of the Cross of the Eagle.
