= Juho Heiskanen =

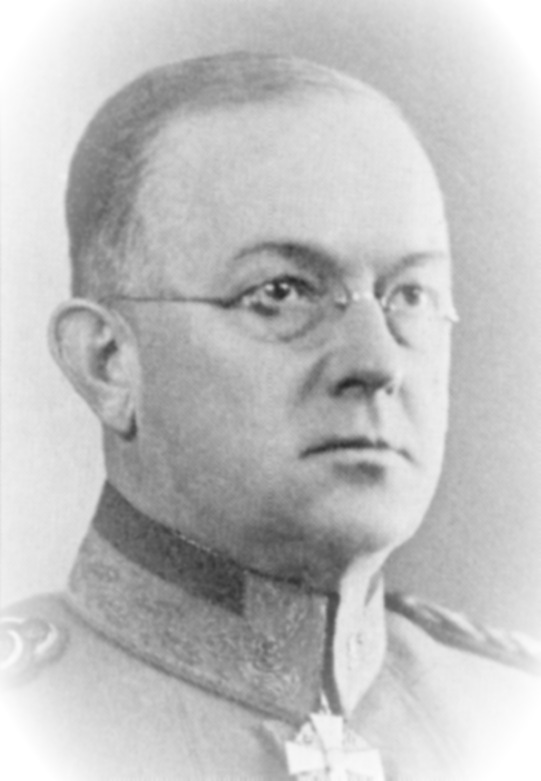
Juho Henrik Heiskanen

Juho Henrik Heiskanen (18 December 1889 Pielisensuu – 11 December 1950) was a Finnish major general during World War II.

== Biography ==
Heiskanen joined the Jaeger Movement in 1915 and trained and fought in the Royal Prussian 27th Jäger Battalion. In 1916, he was arrested by Gendarmerie in Jyväskylä and sent to Petrograd. Heiskanen was released next year during the October Revolution, and he returned to Finland. During the Finnish Civil War, Heiskanen fought for the Whites.

Heiskanen commanded the IV Corps during first days of the Winter War. Heiskanen was removed from the office by C.G.E. Mannerheim due to failures. During the Continuation War, Heiskanen was the Commandant of Viipuri, and the General Inspector of the Military Training.
