= List of minor planets named after rivers =

This is a list of minor planets named after rivers, organized by continent.

== Africa ==
- 1032 Pafuri (Pafuri Triangle, South Africa)
- 1264 Letaba (Letaba River, South Africa)
- 1305 Pongola (Pongola River, South Africa)
- 1323 Tugela (Tugela River, South Africa)
- 1490 Limpopo (Limpopo River, South Africa)
- 35295 Omo (Omo River, aka Omo-Bottego, Ethiopia)

== Asia ==
- 732 Tjilaki (Cilaki River, West Java, Indonesia)
- 1089 Tama (Tama River in Tokyo)
- 1090 Sumida (Sumida River in Tokyo)
- 1266 Tone (Tone River; in the Kantō region of Japan)
- 4941 Yahagi (Yahagi River, Aichi, Japan)
- 6247 Amanogawa (Amanogawa River on Hokkaidō, Japan)
- 10143 Kamogawa (Kamo-gawa or Kamo River in Kyoto Prefecture)
- 12757 Yangtze (Yangtze River)
- 13096 Tigris (Tigris, Turkey, Syria, Iraq)
- 15804 Yenisei (Yenisei, Siberia, Russia)
- 16563 Ob (river in central Asia)
- 21182 Teshiogawa (Teshio River on Hokkaidō, Japan)
- 23478 Chikumagawa (Chikumagawa River, Japan)
- 24701 Elyu-Ene (Evenk name of the Lena River, Siberia)
- 32858 Kitakamigawa (Kitakamigawa River, Japan)
- 79152 Abukumagawa (Abukuma River (Abukuma-gawa), Japan)
- 100936 Mekong (in China and Indochina)
- 110297 Yellowriver (Yellow River)
- 190057 Nakagawa (Nakagawa River, Tokushima prefecture, Japan)

== Europe ==
- 364 Isara (Isère River)
- 1149 Volga (Volga River)
- 1223 Neckar (Neckar River in Germany)
- 1302 Werra (Werra River in Germany)
- 1381 Danubia (River Danube)
- 1488 Aura (Aura river)
- 1508 Kemi (Finnish town and river)
- 1929 Kollaa (Kollaa River, Russia)
- 2081 Sázava (Sázava River)
- 2123 Vltava (Vltava River)
- 2321 Lužnice (Lužnice River)
- 2390 Nežárka (Nežárka River)
- 3016 Meuse (Meuse River, France, Belgium, and the Netherlands)
- 4405 Otava (Otava River)
- 4698 Jizera (Jizera River)
- 4702 Berounka (Berounka River)
- 4801 Ohře (Ohře River)
- 6501 Isonzo (Isonzo/Soča River, Italy/Slovenia)
- 6522 Aci (Jaci River near Acireale, Italy)
- 7174 Semois (Semois)
- 7669 Malše (Malše River)
- 9578 Klyazma (Klyazma River)
- 10038 Tanaro (Tanaro River, the longest river of Piedmont, Italy)
- 10735 Seine (Seine River, France)
- 11194 Mirna (Mirna River, Croatia)
- 11302 Rubicon (Rubicon River, Italy, famously crossed by Julius Caesar)
- 11400 Raša (Raša River, Croatia)
- 11875 Rhône (Rhône, Swiss/French river)
- 13031 Durance (Durance River, France)
- 13032 Tarn (Tarn (river), France)
- 13033 Gardon (Gardon River, Gard, France)
- 13121 Tisza (Tisza River)
- 13122 Drava (Drava River)
- 16481 Thames (Thames River)
- 16689 Vistula (Latin name of Vistula River)
- 21290 Vydra (Vydra River)
- 40092 Memel (the other name of Neman River)
- 151430 Nemunas (Nemunas River, the largest river in Lithuania)
- 216451 Irsha (Irsha River, Ukraine)
- 237845 Neris (Neris River, Belarus)
- 251001 Sluch (Sluch River, Ukraine)
- 363582 Folpotat (Folpotat, a small river in an isolated Jura valley, Switzerland)

== North America ==
- 1345 Potomac (Potomac River)

== South and Central America ==
- 1042 Amazone (Amazon River)
- 1779 Paraná (Paraná River, a river in south Central South America)

== See also ==
- List of minor planets
- List of minor planets named after people
- List of minor planets named after places
- List of named minor planets (numerical) and (alphabetical)
- Meanings of minor planet names
