= Jean Denis Antoine Caucannier =

French painter (1854–1916)

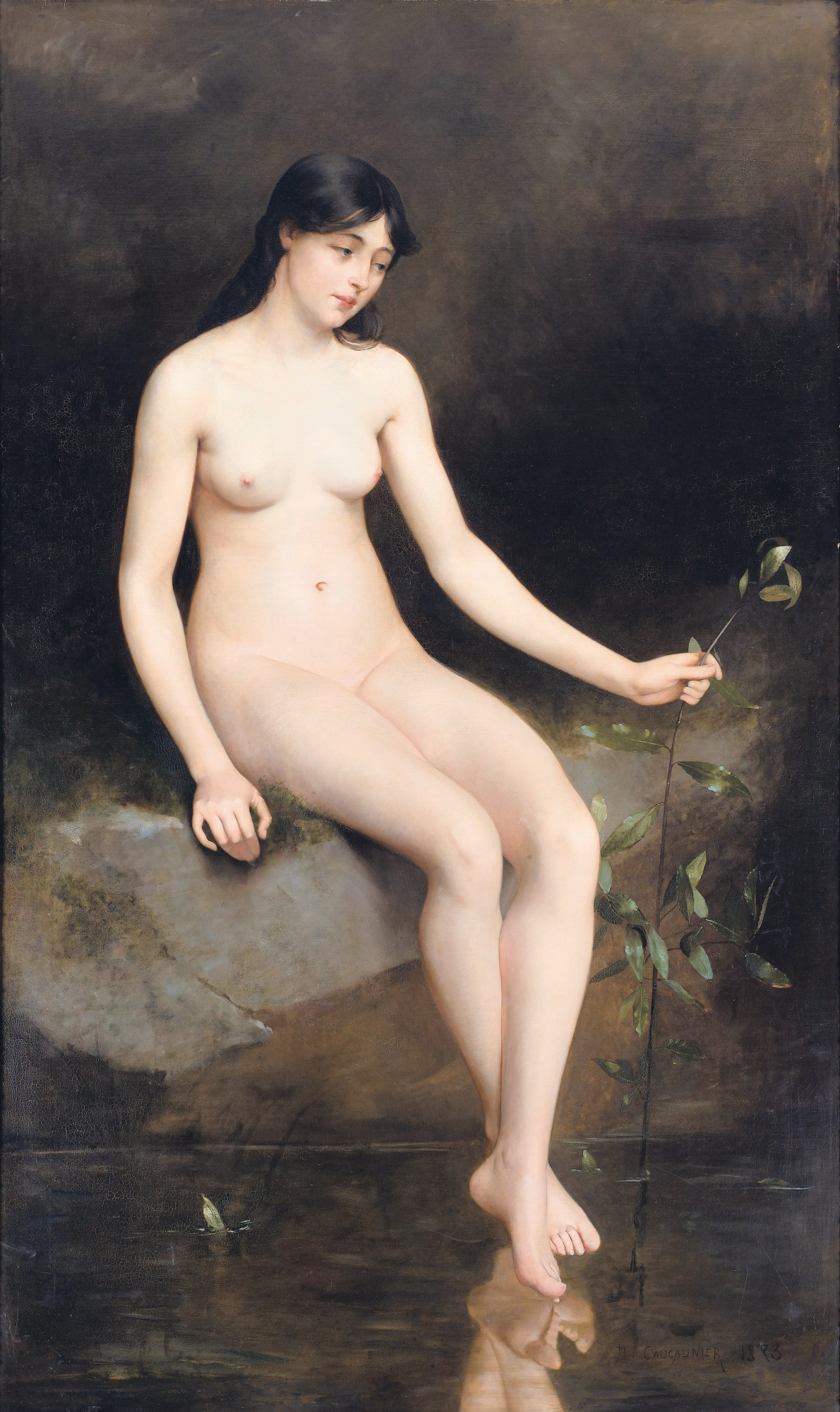
Galatea on the bank of the Acis (1883)

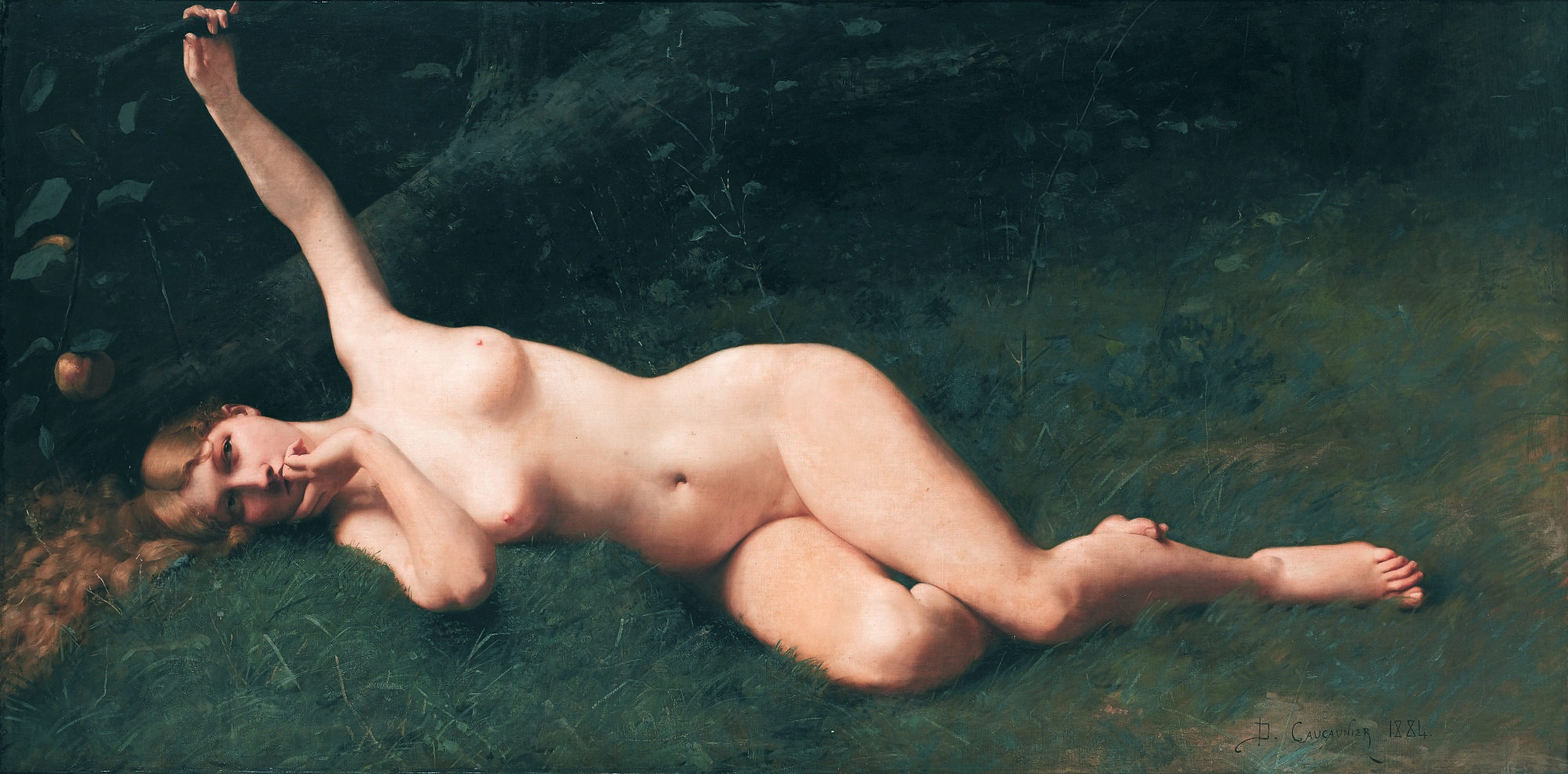
Eve and the apple (1884)

Jean Denis Antoine Caucannier (c. 1860–1905/06) was a French painter.

== Life ==
Caucannier was born in Paris in about 1860. He studied under Isidore Pils, Jules Frédéric Ballavoine and Jules Lefebvre.

He painted portraits and genre paintings in oils: an example of the latter is Jeune femme aux glycines (Young woman with wisteria'), now in a private collection. He exhibited a number of genre paintings at the Paris Salon between 1880 and 1905, including: La Femme de Potiphar ('Potiphar's Wife'), La Fourmi ('The Ant') and L'Araignée ('The Spider'). He became a member of the Société des Artistes Français in 1883. According to the Benezit Dictionary of Artists, "His body of work is at times somewhat sickly-sweet, but nonetheless demonstrates an ability to capture light effects."

He died in Paris in 1905 or 1906.
