= Kollaa (disambiguation) =

Kollaa may refer to:

- Kollaa, river in Russia
- 1929 Kollaa, asteroid
- Battle of Kollaa, between Finland and the Soviet Union during the Winter War (1939-1940)
