= Amanogawa =

Amanogawa (Japanese: 天の川) may refer to:

- Amanogawa (river)
- 6247 Amanogawa, an asteroid
- "Heavenly River", the Japanese name for the Milky Way
