= 1302 Werra =

Themistian asteroid

Discovery
- Discovered by: K. Reinmuth
- Discovery site: Heidelberg Obs.
- Discovery date: 28 September 1924

Designations
- Named after: Werra (river in central Germany)
- Alternative designations: 1924 SV · 1930 WD
- Minor planet category: main-belt · (outer); Themis

Orbital characteristics
- Epoch 4 September 2017 (JD 2458000.5)
- Uncertainty parameter 0
- Observation arc: 93.10 yr (34,003 days)
- Aphelion: 3.6580 AU
- Perihelion: 2.5677 AU
- Semi-major axis: 3.1128 AU
- Eccentricity: 0.1751
- Orbital period (sidereal): 5.49 yr (2,006 days)
- Mean anomaly: 251.95°
- Mean motion: 0° 10^{m} 46.2^{s} / day
- Inclination: 2.5958°
- Longitude of ascending node: 90.142°
- Argument of perihelion: 354.64°

Physical characteristics
- Dimensions: 24.35±6.54 km 31.04 km (calculated); 32.18±0.50 km 34.542±0.258 km 35.041±0.114 km
- Synodic rotation period: 48 h (retracted)
- Geometric albedo: 0.0710±0.0158; 0.076±0.006; 0.08 (assumed); 0.10±0.07; 0.102±0.004
- Spectral type: C (assumed)
- Absolute magnitude (H): 10.60 · 10.8 · 10.90 · 10.99±0.27

1302 Werra, provisional designation 1924 SV, is a Themistian asteroid from the outer regions of the asteroid belt, approximately 30 kilometers in diameter. It was discovered on 28 September 1924, by German astronomer Karl Reinmuth at the Heidelberg-Königstuhl State Observatory. The asteroid was named for the river Werra in central Germany.

== Orbit and classification ==
Werra is a Themistian asteroid that belongs to the Themis family (602), a very large family of carbonaceous asteroids, named after its parent body 24 Themis.

It orbits the Sun in the outer main-belt at a distance of 2.6–3.7 AU once every 5 years and 6 months (2,006 days; semi-major axis of 3.11 AU). Its orbit has an eccentricity of 0.18 and an inclination of 3° with respect to the ecliptic. The body's observation arc begins at Heidelberg with its official discovery observation in September 1924.

== Physical characteristics ==
Werra is an assumed carbonaceous C-type asteroid, which is the overall spectral type for members of the Themis family.

=== Rotation period ===
In March 2009, a fragmentary lightcurve of Werra was obtained from photometric observations by French amateur astronomer Pierre Antonini. Lightcurve analysis gave a poorly constraint rotation period of 2 days with a brightness amplitude of less than 0.1 magnitude. The result was later retracted at the Lightcurve Data Base (U=n.a.). As of 2017, no secure period has been obtained.

=== Diameter and albedo ===
According to the surveys carried out by the Japanese Akari satellite and the NEOWISE mission of NASA's Wide-field Infrared Survey Explorer, Werra measures between 24.35 and 35.041 kilometers in diameter and its surface has an albedo between 0.0710 and 0.102.

The Collaborative Asteroid Lightcurve Link assumes an albedo of 0.08 and calculates a diameter of 31.04 kilometers based on an absolute magnitude of 10.9.

== Naming ==
This minor planet was named after the river Werra in central Germany. It merges the Fulda in Hannoversch-Münden, Lower Saxony, to form the river Weser. The official naming citation was mentioned in The Names of the Minor Planets by Paul Herget in 1955 (H 119).
