= 2123 Vltava =

Stony Koronian asteroid

Discovery
- Discovered by: N. Chernykh
- Discovery site: Crimean Astrophysical Obs.
- Discovery date: 22 September 1973

Designations
- Named after: Vltava (Czech national river)
- Alternative designations: 1973 SL_{2} · 1934 PB; 1936 AE · 1942 EV; 1951 AQ_{1} · 1954 UL; 1956 AJ · 1956 CE; 1964 VZ · 1975 AR; 1977 JB_{1} · 1978 SO
- Minor planet category: main-belt · (outer); Koronis

Orbital characteristics
- Epoch 4 September 2017 (JD 2458000.5)
- Uncertainty parameter 0
- Observation arc: 82.23 yr (30,036 days)
- Aphelion: 3.0862 AU
- Perihelion: 2.6337 AU
- Semi-major axis: 2.8600 AU
- Eccentricity: 0.0791
- Orbital period (sidereal): 4.84 yr (1,767 days)
- Mean anomaly: 11.862°
- Mean motion: 0° 12^{m} 13.68^{s} / day
- Inclination: 1.0106°
- Longitude of ascending node: 311.62°
- Argument of perihelion: 58.849°

Physical characteristics
- Dimensions: 14.42±1.3 km (IRAS:2); 14.461±0.186; 14.800±0.252 km 15.12±0.75 km
- Synodic rotation period: 16.2954±0.0282 h 34.0 h
- Geometric albedo: 0.2032±0.0183; 0.212±0.034; 0.2135±0.046 (IRAS:2); 0.220±0.025
- Spectral type: S
- Absolute magnitude (H): 11.327±0.001 (R) · 11.50 (IRAS:2) · 11.5 · 11.75±0.09 · 12.09±0.50

2123 Vltava, provisional designation 1973 SL_{2}, is a stony Koronian asteroid from the outer region of the asteroid belt, approximately 15 kilometers in diameter. It was discovered on 22 September 1973, by Soviet–Russian astronomer Nikolai Chernykh at the Crimean Astrophysical Observatory on the Crimean peninsula in Nauchnyj. It is named for the river Vltava (Moldau).

== Classification and orbit ==
The S-type asteroid is a member of the Koronis family, which is named after 158 Koronis and consists of about 300 known bodies with nearly co-planar ecliptical orbits. The asteroid orbits the Sun in the outer main-belt at a distance of 2.6–3.1 AU once every 4 years and 10 months (1,767 days). Its orbit has an eccentricity of 0.08 and an inclination of 1° with respect to the ecliptic. A first precovery taken at Heidelberg in 1934, extends the body's observation arc by 39 years prior to its official discovery observation at Nauchnyj.

== Physical characteristics ==
=== Rotation period ===
Between 1998 and 2005, a survey of members of the Koronis family by seven different observatories obtained a large number of rotational lightcurves from . For Vltava, the survey gave an ambiguous rotation period of 34.0 hours with a brightness variation of 0.21 in magnitude (U=2). In 2014, photometric observations at the Palomar Transient Factory in California rendered a lightcurve with an alternative solution of 16.2954 hours, or about half the period previously found, with an amplitude of 0.19 magnitude (U=2).

=== Diameter and albedo ===
According to the surveys carried out by the international Infrared Astronomical Satellite (IRAS), the Japanese Akari satellite, and the NEOWISE mission of NASA's Wide-field Infrared Survey Explorer, the asteroid measures between 14.4 and 15.1 kilometers in diameter and its surface has an albedo between 0.20 and 0.22.

== Naming ==
This minor planet was named for the Vltava (Moldau), the longest river within the Czech Republic, running through the city of Prague. The approved naming citation was published by the Minor Planet Center on 1 April 1980 (M.P.C. 5283).
