= 6522 Aci =

Asteroid from the inner regions of the asteroid belt

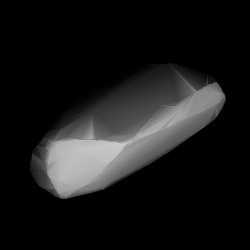
- Shape model of Aci from its lightcurve

Discovery
- Discovered by: E. F. Helin
- Discovery site: Palomar Obs.
- Discovery date: 9 July 1991

Designations
- Pronunciation: Italian: [ˈaːtʃi]
- Named after: Italian Jaci river at Acireale (Acis and Galatea)
- Alternative designations: 1991 NQ · 1990 BH_{4}
- Minor planet category: main-belt · Phocaea

Orbital characteristics
- Epoch 4 September 2017 (JD 2458000.5)
- Uncertainty parameter 0
- Observation arc: 27.36 yr (9,995 days)
- Aphelion: 2.8595 AU
- Perihelion: 1.9107 AU
- Semi-major axis: 2.3851 AU
- Eccentricity: 0.1989
- Orbital period (sidereal): 3.68 yr (1,345 days)
- Mean anomaly: 68.743°
- Mean motion: 0° 16^{m} 3.36^{s} / day
- Inclination: 22.109°
- Longitude of ascending node: 294.45°
- Argument of perihelion: 314.18°

Physical characteristics
- Mean diameter: 5.65 km (calculated); 6.125±0.119 km km
- Synodic rotation period: 7.6921±0.0017 h
- Geometric albedo: 0.23 (assumed); 0.392±0.029
- Spectral type: S (family-based)
- Absolute magnitude (H): 12.7 · 13.0 · 13.003±0.005 (R) · 13.1 · 13.45

6522 Aci (prov. designation: 1991 NQ) is an elongated Phocaea asteroid from the inner regions of the asteroid belt. It was discovered on 9 July 1991, by American astronomer Eleanor Helin at Palomar Observatory in California, United States. The likely stony S-type asteroid has a rotation period of 5.65 hours and measures approximately 6 kilometers (3.7 miles) in diameter. It was named for the Jaci river at Acireale in Italy, and refers to the myth of Acis and Galatea.

== Orbit and classification ==
Aci is a member of the Phocaea family (701), a relatively small group of stony asteroids with similar orbital characteristics. It orbits the Sun in the inner main-belt at a distance of 1.9–2.9 AU once every 3 years and 8 months (1,345 days). Its orbit has an eccentricity of 0.20 and an inclination of 22° with respect to the ecliptic. In January 1990, the asteroid was first observed as 1990 BH_{4} at the German Karl Schwarzschild Observatory, extending the body's observation arc by 17 months prior to its official discovery observation at Palomar.

== Naming ==
This minor planet was named for the Jaci river near Acireale, southeast of Mount Etna in Sicily, Italy. Other towns and villages along the river, such as Aci Castello, Aci Trezza, and Aci Sant'Antonio, were also honored. The river's name refers to the myth Acis and Galatea from Greek mythology, which is about a young Sicilian shepherd, who was killed by the jealous cyclops Polyphemus, because of his love for the sea nymph Galatea. The minor planet 74 Galatea is named after this Nereid. The approved naming citation was published by the Minor Planet Center on 26 October 1996 (M.P.C. 28090).

== Physical characteristics ==
=== Rotation period ===
In September 2010, a rotational lightcurve of Aci was obtained from photometric observations taken at the Palomar Transient Factory in California. Lightcurve analysis gave a rotation period of 7.6921 hours with a brightness variation of 0.68 magnitude (U=2).

=== Diameter and albedo ===
According to the NEOWISE mission of NASA's Wide-field Infrared Survey Explorer, Aci measures 6.1 kilometers in diameter and its surface has a high albedo of 0.39, while the Collaborative Asteroid Lightcurve Link assumes an albedo of 0.23 – which derives from 25 Phocaea, namesake and largest member of this orbital family – and calculates a diameter of 5.7 kilometers with an absolute magnitude of 13.45.
