= 1345 Potomac =

Hildian asteroid

Discovery
- Discovered by: J. H. Metcalf
- Discovery site: Taunton Obs.
- Discovery date: 4 February 1908

Designations
- Named after: Potomac River (U.S. Mid-Atlantic river)
- Alternative designations: 1908 CG · 1932 CF; 1932 EA · 1932 FB; 1971 DE_{2}
- Minor planet category: main-belt · (outer); Hilda · background

Orbital characteristics
- Epoch 27 April 2019 (JD 2458600.5)
- Uncertainty parameter 0
- Observation arc: 111.20 yr (40,617 d)
- Aphelion: 4.7100 AU
- Perihelion: 3.2611 AU
- Semi-major axis: 3.9856 AU
- Eccentricity: 0.1818
- Orbital period (sidereal): 7.96 yr (2,906 d)
- Mean anomaly: 31.380°
- Mean motion: 0° 7^{m} 26.04^{s} / day
- Inclination: 11.402°
- Longitude of ascending node: 137.43°
- Argument of perihelion: 333.12°
- Jupiter MOID: 0.4592 AU
- T_{Jupiter}: 2.9930

Physical characteristics
- Mean diameter: 71.82±3.0 km 72.975±0.463 km 76.72±2.34 km
- Synodic rotation period: 11.41±0.01 h
- Geometric albedo: 0.039±0.003; 0.043±0.008; 0.0439±0.004
- Spectral type: Tholen = X · C B–V = 0.719; U–B = 0.286
- Absolute magnitude (H): 9.73; 9.9

1345 Potomac (/pəˈtoʊmək/), provisional designation 1908 CG, is a dark Hildian asteroid from the outermost regions of the asteroid belt, approximately 73 kilometers (45 mi) in diameter. It was discovered on 4 February 1908, by American astronomer Joel Metcalf at the Taunton Observatory (803) in Massachusetts, United States. The X-type asteroid has a rotation period of 11.4 hours. It was named for the Potomac River on which Washington, D.C. is located.

== Orbit and classification ==
Potomac is member of the dynamical Hilda group, which stays in 3:2 orbital resonance with Jupiter. It is, however, not a member of the Hilda family but a non-family asteroid of the main belt's background population when applying the Hierarchical Clustering Method to its proper orbital elements.

It orbits the Sun in the outermost asteroid belt at a distance of 3.3–4.7 AU once every 7 years and 12 months (2,910 days; semi-major axis of 3.99 AU). Its orbit has an eccentricity of 0.18 and an inclination of 11° with respect to the ecliptic. The body's observation arc begins at the United States Naval Observatory, three weeks after its official discovery observation at Taunton.

== Naming ==
This minor planet was named after the U.S. Potomac River in the Mid-Atlantic region of the United States, on which Washington, D.C. is located. The river flows from West Virginia into the Chesapeake Bay and forms the southern boundary of Maryland. The official naming citation was mentioned in The Names of the Minor Planets by Paul Herget in 1955 (H 122).

== Physical characteristics ==
In the Tholen classification, Potomac is an X-type asteroid. It has also been characterized as a carbonaceous C-type asteroid by Pan-STARRS photometric survey.

=== Rotation period ===
Two rotational lightcurves of Potomac was obtained from photometric observations. Lightcurve analysis gave a rotation period of 11.40 and 11.41 hours with a brightness amplitude of 0.22 and 0.24 magnitude, respectively (U=2/3).

=== Diameter and albedo ===
According to the surveys carried out by the Infrared Astronomical Satellite IRAS, the Japanese Akari satellite and the NEOWISE mission of NASA's Wide-field Infrared Survey Explorer, Potomac measures between 71.82 and 76.72 kilometers in diameter and its surface has an albedo between 0.039 and 0.0439.

The Collaborative Asteroid Lightcurve Link adopts the results obtained by IRAS, that is, an albedo of 0.0439 and a diameter of 71.82 kilometers based on an absolute magnitude of 9.73.
