= 1149 Volga =

Main-belt asteroid

Discovery
- Discovered by: E. Skvortsov
- Discovery site: Simeiz Obs.
- Discovery date: 1 August 1929

Designations
- Named after: Volga River (Russian river)
- Alternative designations: 1929 PF
- Minor planet category: main-belt · (outer) background

Orbital characteristics
- Epoch 4 September 2017 (JD 2458000.5)
- Uncertainty parameter 0
- Observation arc: 87.92 yr (32,114 days)
- Aphelion: 3.1733 AU
- Perihelion: 2.6228 AU
- Semi-major axis: 2.8981 AU
- Eccentricity: 0.0950
- Orbital period (sidereal): 4.93 yr (1,802 days)
- Mean anomaly: 258.64°
- Mean motion: 0° 11^{m} 59.28^{s} / day
- Inclination: 11.750°
- Longitude of ascending node: 261.44°
- Argument of perihelion: 116.40°

Physical characteristics
- Dimensions: 48.50±13.27 km 52.377±0.365 km 53.86±18.96 km 55.57±1.8 km 56.020±1.123 km 57.67±0.77 km
- Synodic rotation period: 27.5 h
- Geometric albedo: 0.03±0.02; 0.032±0.001; 0.0333±0.0027; 0.0338±0.002; 0.038±0.006; 0.04±0.02
- Spectral type: P · C B–V = 0.690; U–B = 0.250
- Absolute magnitude (H): 10.44±0.44 · 10.57 · 10.69

1149 Volga, provisional designation 1929 PF, is a dark background asteroid from the outer regions of the asteroid belt, approximately 55 kilometers in diameter. It was discovered on 1 August 1929, by Soviet astronomer Evgenij Skvorcov (a.k.a. Skvortsov) at the Simeiz Observatory on the Crimean peninsula. The asteroid was named after the Volga River.

== Orbit and classification ==
Volga is a non-family asteroid from the main belt's background population. It orbits the Sun in the outer asteroid belt at a distance of 2.6–3.2 AU once every 4 years and 11 months (1,802 days; semi-major axis 2.90 AU). Its orbit has an eccentricity of 0.10 and an inclination of 12° with respect to the ecliptic. The body's observation arc begins at Simeiz Observatory on 5 August 1929, four nights after its official discovery observation.

== Physical characteristics ==
The Wide-field Infrared Survey Explorer (WISE) characterized Volga as a primitive P-type asteroid, while Pan-STARRS photometric survey found it to be a carbonaceous C-type asteroid.

=== Rotation period ===
In October 1984, a rotational lightcurve of Volga was obtained from photometric observations by American astronomer Richard Binzel. Lightcurve analysis gave a somewhat longer-than average rotation period of 27.5 hours with a brightness amplitude of 0.26 magnitude (U=2).

=== Diameter and albedo ===
According to the surveys carried out by the Infrared Astronomical Satellite IRAS, the Japanese Akari satellite and the NEOWISE mission of NASA's WISE telescope, Volga measures between 48.50 and 57.67 kilometers in diameter and its surface has an albedo between 0.03 and 0.04.

The Collaborative Asteroid Lightcurve Link adopts the results obtained by IRAS, that is, an albedo of 0.0338 and a diameter of 55.57 kilometers based on an absolute magnitude of 10.57.

== Naming ==
This minor planet was named after the Volga River, the largest river in Europe and one of the principal ones of Russia. Its name was suggested by the Institute of Theoretical Astronomy in St. Petersburg. The official naming citation was published by the Minor Planet Center on 1 June 1967 (M.P.C. 2740).
