= 1223 Neckar =

Asteroid

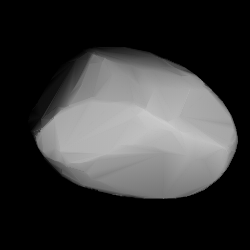
- Shape model of Neckar from its lightcurve

Discovery
- Discovered by: K. Reinmuth
- Discovery site: Heidelberg Obs.
- Discovery date: 6 October 1931

Designations
- Named after: Neckar (German river)
- Alternative designations: 1931 TG · 1930 MN; 1931 TA_{1} · 1953 FC; A907 VD · A909 BD; A917 XC · A917 YA
- Minor planet category: main-belt · (outer); Koronis

Orbital characteristics
- Epoch 23 March 2018 (JD 2458200.5)
- Uncertainty parameter 0
- Observation arc: 109.58 yr (40,025 d)
- Aphelion: 3.0395 AU
- Perihelion: 2.6977 AU
- Semi-major axis: 2.8686 AU
- Eccentricity: 0.0596
- Orbital period (sidereal): 4.86 yr (1,775 d)
- Mean anomaly: 235.10°
- Mean motion: 0° 12^{m} 10.44^{s} / day
- Inclination: 2.5448°
- Longitude of ascending node: 40.812°
- Argument of perihelion: 15.444°

Physical characteristics
- Mean diameter: 22.783±0.213 km 23.06±0.56 km 24.68±0.55 km 25.736±0.261 km 26.07±0.86 km 27.96 km (derived)
- Synodic rotation period: 7.763 h 7.80±0.06 h 7.81 h 7.82124 h 7.82401±0.00005 h 7.827±0.0036 h 8.6 h (wrong) (Note: Tedesco (1979) web: rotation period 8.6 hours with a brightness amplitude of 0.45 mag. Summary figures for (1223) Neckar at Collaborative Asteroid Lightcurve Link (CALL).); 8.78 h (wrong)
- Geometric albedo: 0.123; 0.1461±0.0271; 0.152±0.025; 0.170±0.012; 0.201±0.011
- Spectral type: Tholen = S · S B–V = 0.840; U–B = 0.405
- Absolute magnitude (H): 10.16±0.10 (R); 10.304±0.002 (R); 10.51±0.28; 10.58; 10.66

1223 Neckar, provisional designation 1931 TG, is a stony Koronian asteroid from the outer region of the asteroid belt, approximately 25 kilometers (16 miles) in diameter. Discovered by Karl Reinmuth at Heidelberg Observatory in 1931, the asteroid was named for the German river Neckar. The S-type asteroid has a rotation period of 7.8 hours.

== Discovery ==
Neckar was discovered on 6 October 1931, by German astronomer Karl Reinmuth at Heidelberg Observatory in southwest Germany. Five nights later, it was independently discovered by Fernand Rigaux at Uccle in Belgium. The Minor Planet Center only acknowledges the first discoverer. The asteroid was observed as A907 VD at Heidelberg in November 1907, extending its observation arc by 24 years prior to its official discovery observation.

== Orbit and classification ==
Neckar is a core member of the Koronis family (605), a very large outer asteroid family with nearly co-planar ecliptical orbits. The family, named after 158 Koronis, is thought to have been formed at least two billion years ago in a catastrophic collision between two larger bodies. It orbits the Sun in the outer main-belt at a distance of 2.7–3.0 AU once every 4 years and 10 months (1,775 days; semi-major axis of 2.87 AU). Its orbit has an eccentricity of 0.06 and an inclination of 3° with respect to the ecliptic.

== Physical characteristics ==
In the Tholen classification, Neckar is a common stony S-type asteroid. It has also been characterized as an S-type by Pan-STARRS.

=== Rotation period ===
Best rated rotational lightcurve of Neckar gave a rotation period of 7.763 and 7.81 hours with a brightness variation of 0.18 and 0.45 magnitude, respectively (U=3/3). Photometric observations taken by Richard Binzel and Ed Tedesco in the 1970s and 1980s, however, gave a longer period and are now considered incorrect (U=0/0).

Two lightcurves in the R-band with a period of 7.80 and 7.8273 hours (Δ0.21/0.28 mag) were also obtained at the Palomar Transient Factory in 2010 and 2014, respectively (U=2/2). Neckar's spin axes has been determined several times. The best rated result, from a group led by Polish astronomers, gave two poles at (70.0°, 45.0°) and (225.0°, 42.0°) in ecliptic coordinates.

=== Diameter and albedo ===
According to the surveys carried out by the Japanese Akari satellite and NASA's Wide-field Infrared Survey Explorer with its subsequent NEOWISE mission, Neckar measures between 22.783 and 26.07 kilometers in diameter, and its surface has an albedo between 0.146 and 0.201. The Collaborative Asteroid Lightcurve Link adopts an albedo of 0.123 obtained by Morrison in the 1970s, and derives a diameter of 27.96 kilometers using an absolute magnitude of 10.66.

== Naming ==
This minor planet was named after the river Neckar, running through the southwestern parts of Germany and in particular through the city of Heidelberg, location of the discovering observatory. The river origins in the Black Forrest and flows into the Rhine river. Naming citation was first mentioned in The Names of the Minor Planets by Paul Herget in 1955 (H 113).
