= List of named minor planets (numerical) =

This is a list of named minor planets in numerical order. As of 26 May 2026, it contains a total of 26,067 named bodies. Minor planets for which no article exists redirect to the list of minor planets (see List of minor planets § Main index).

== Statistics ==
Percentage of named minor planets for each partial list's number range. Most named minor planets have numbers below 40,000. The lowest-numbered unnamed minor planet is currently (4596) 1981 QB.
Total of named minor planets per partial list. The spikes are due to the partial lists's increasing number ranges (1, 10, and 50 thousand).

== See also ==
- List of minor planet discoverers
- List of minor planets named after people
- List of minor planets named after places
- List of minor planets named after rivers
- List of observatory codes
- Meanings of minor planet names § Index
