= Jules Frédéric Ballavoine =

French painter (1842–1914)

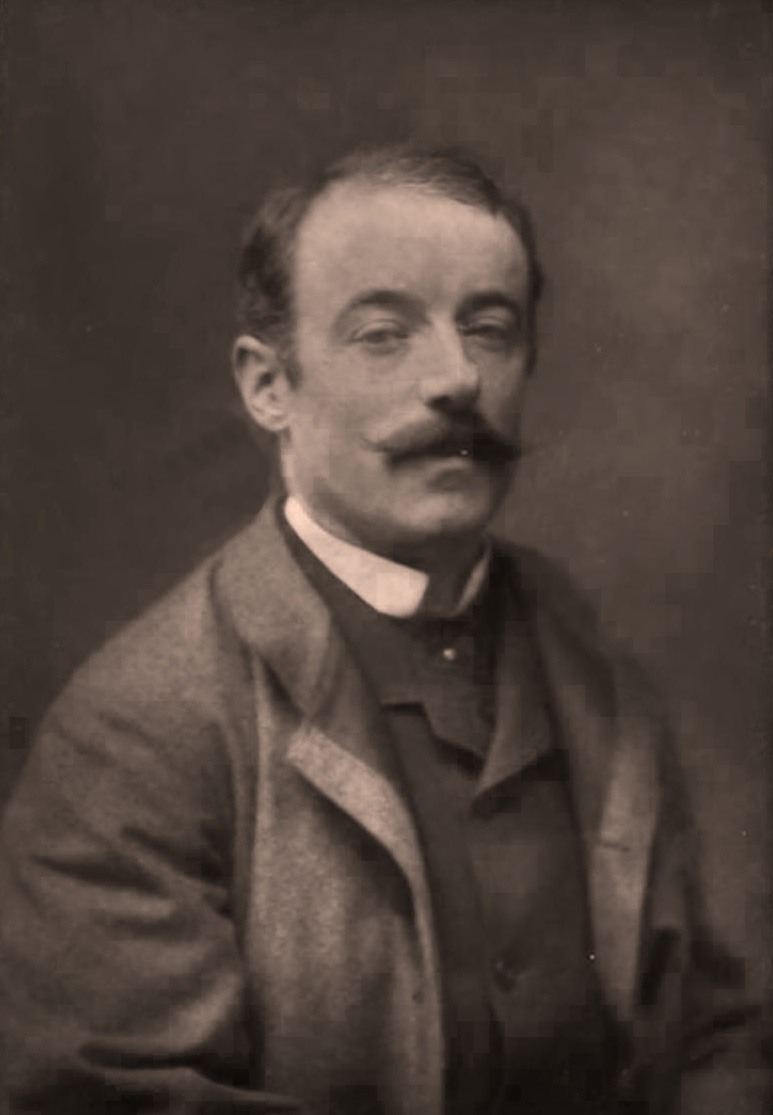
- Photographic portrait (c. 1882)
- Born: 29 August 1842 (or 1855); 8th arrondissement of Paris
- Died: 3 February 1914 (or 1901); Asnières-sur-Seine

Jules Frédéric Ballavoine (1842–1914) was a French painter and draughtsman. He painted portraits, landscapes, genre and historical scenes and nudes. According to the Benezit Dictionary of Artists, "He painted conventional historical themes, but his genre painting is freer and more intimate in style."

== Life ==
The birth date of Jules Frédéric Ballavoine has long been debated. According to the Livre d'or du Salon of 1880, he was born in Paris in 1842. Other sources give the later date of 1855, although this is incompatible with the fact that he exhibited at the Paris Salon from 1865.

Ballavoine studied under Isidore Pils at the École des Beaux-Arts de Paris, and afterwards produced nature studies. He fought in the Franco-Prussian War.

He was a member of the Société des Artistes Français. He last exhibited at the Salon in 1911, less than three years before his death in 1914 at the age of 71. Some sources give the earlier death date of 1901.

== Gallery ==
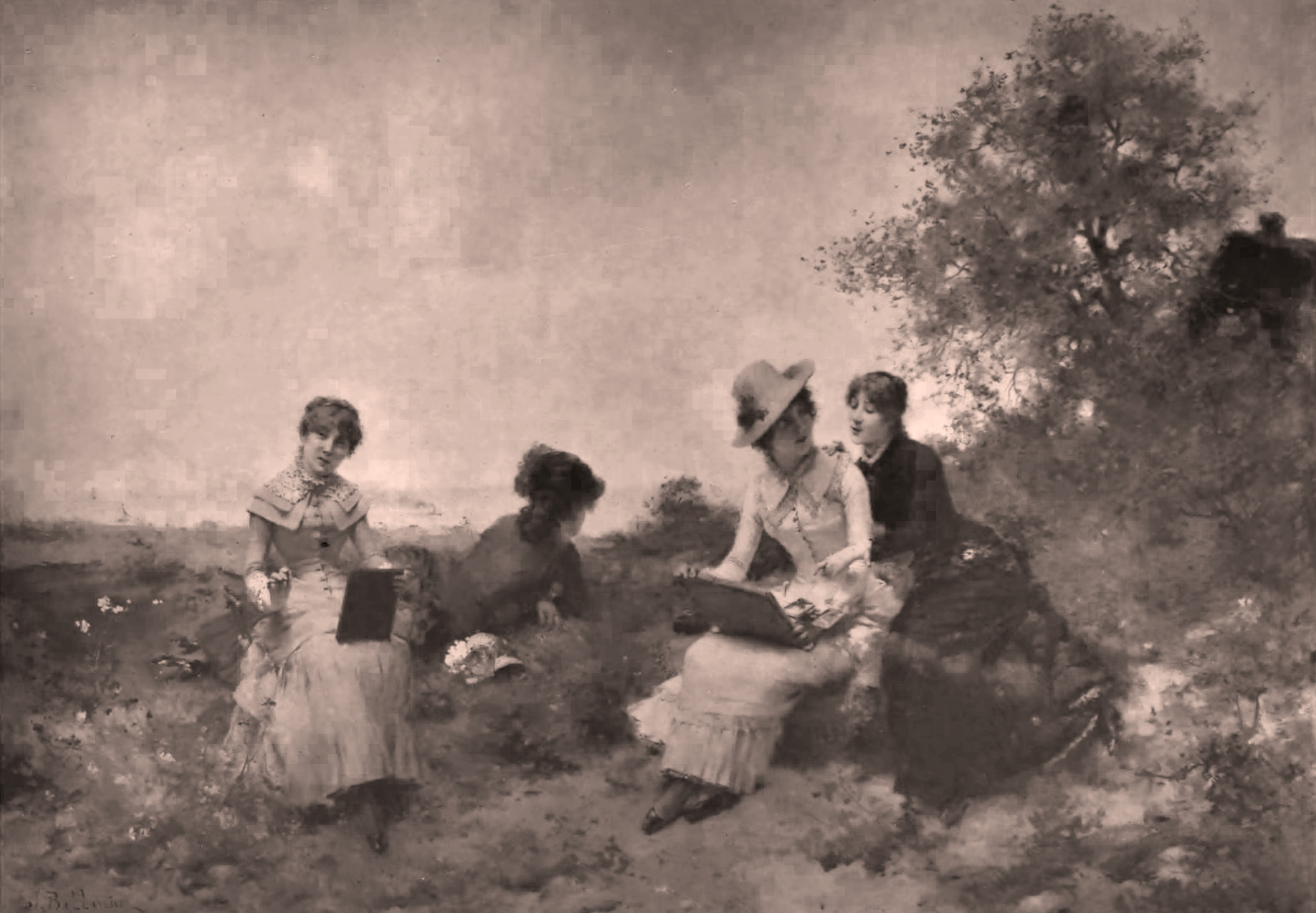
Les Aquarellistes, 1882

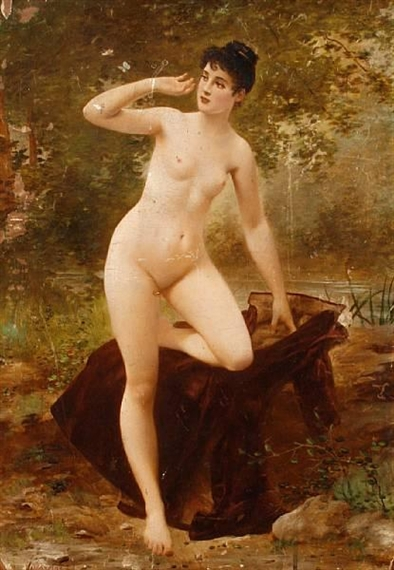
Les indiscrets, 1890

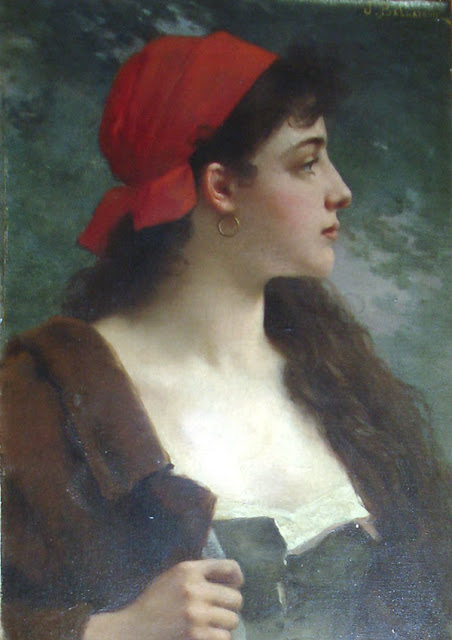
Sauvageonne

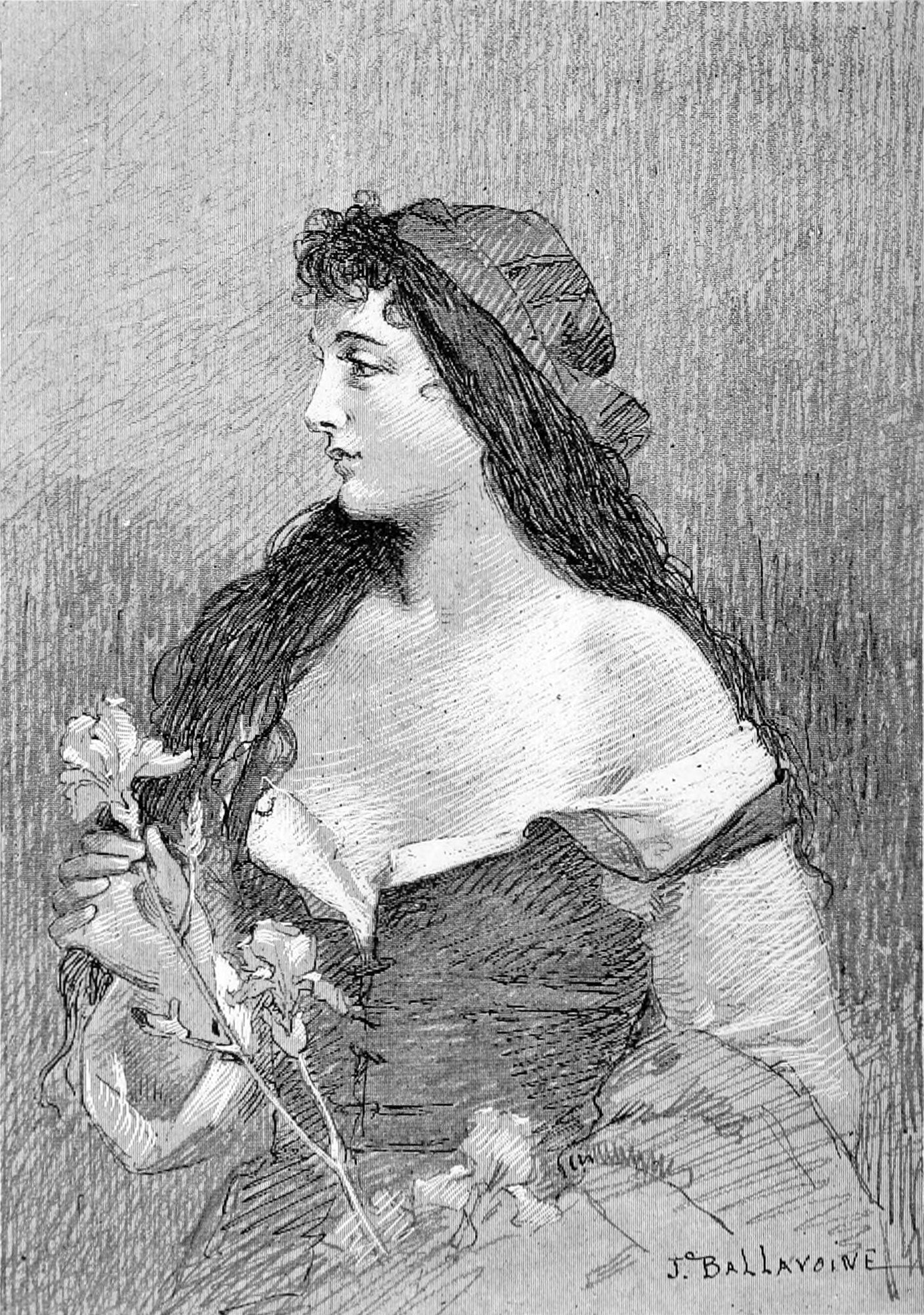
Sauvageonne — Wild blossom, 1892

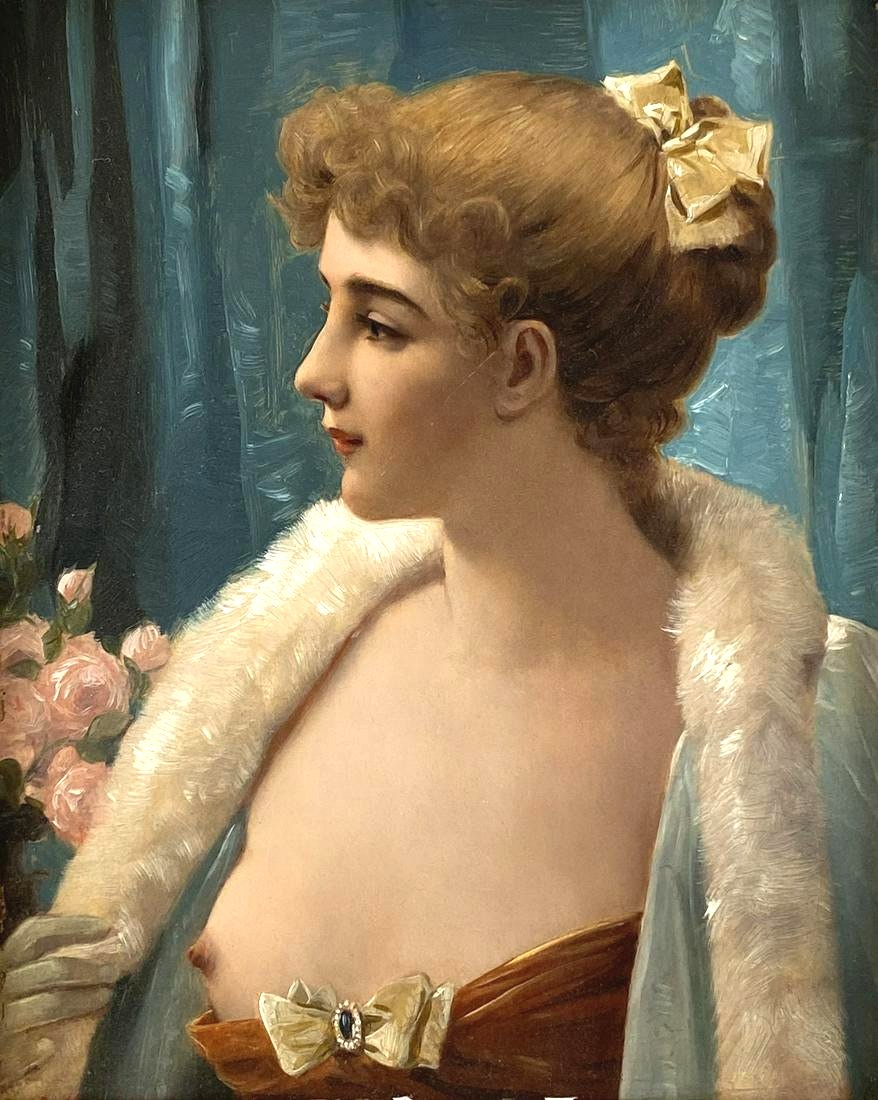
Young Beauty

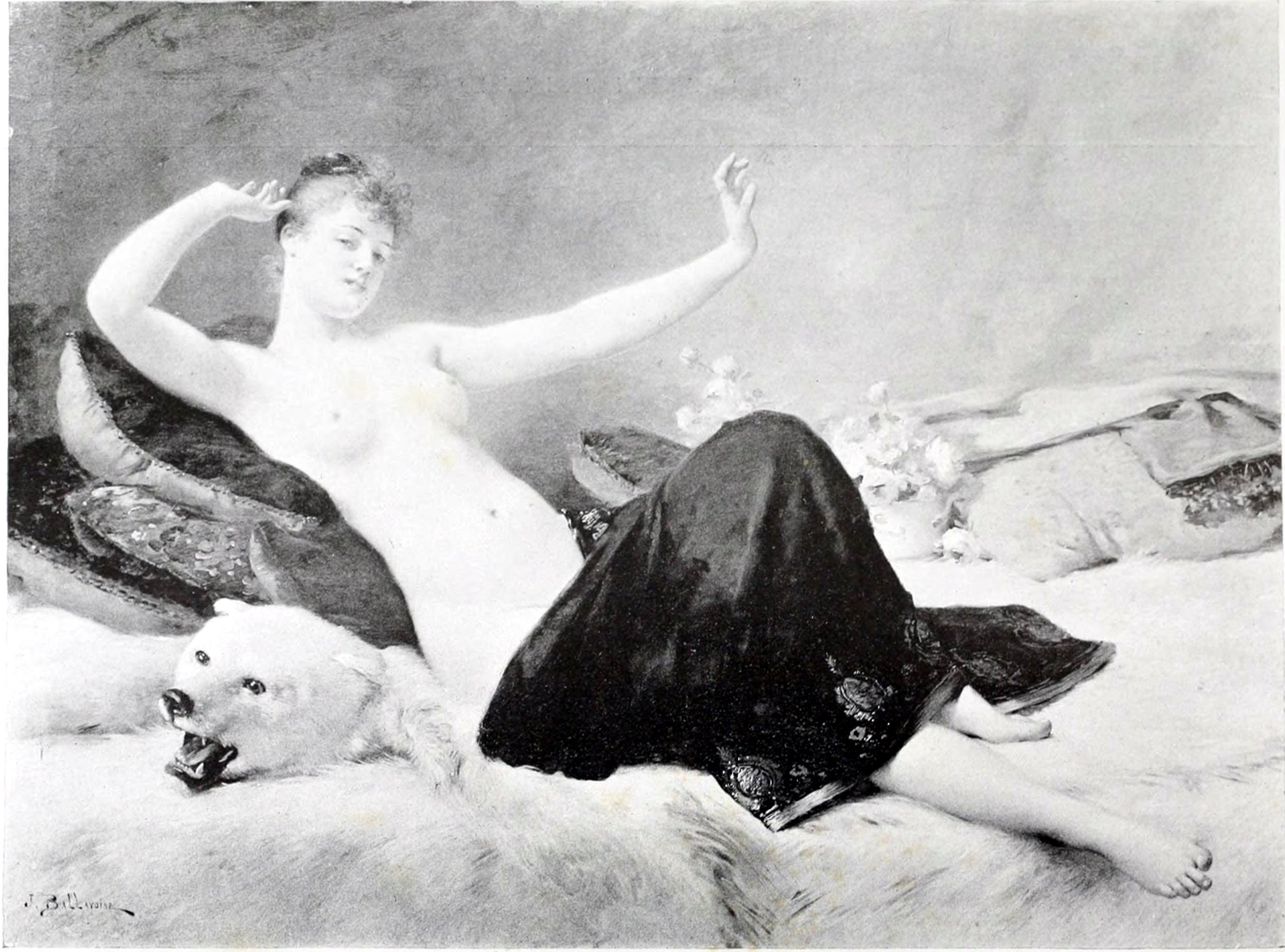
Lassitude

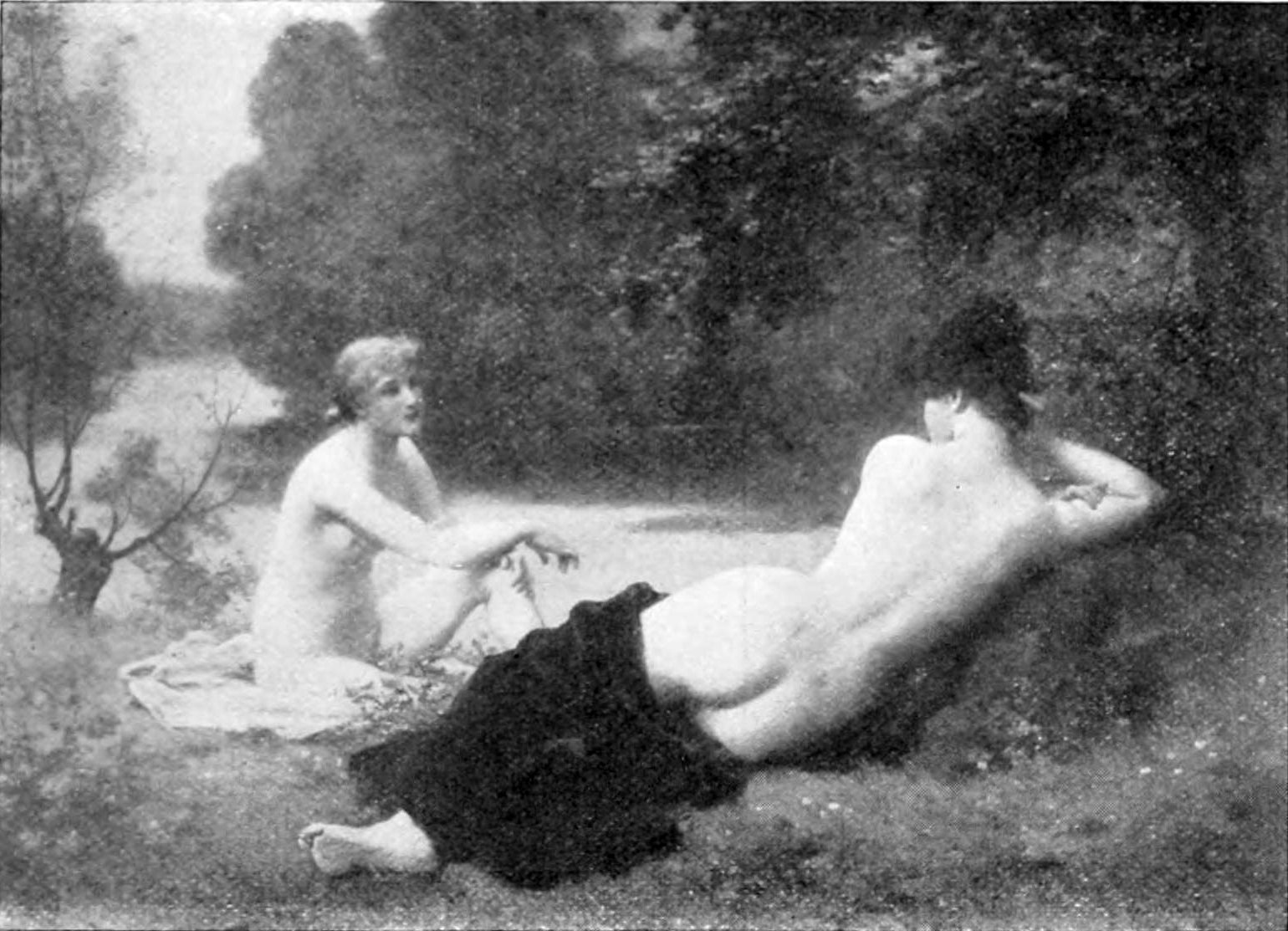
Bathers at Rest

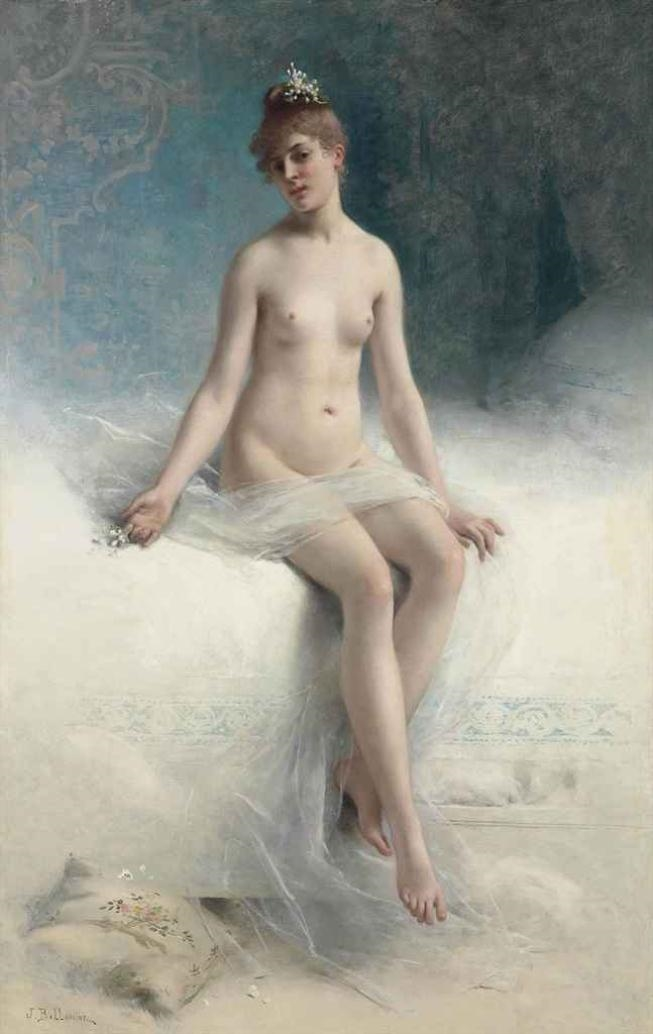
Fragility

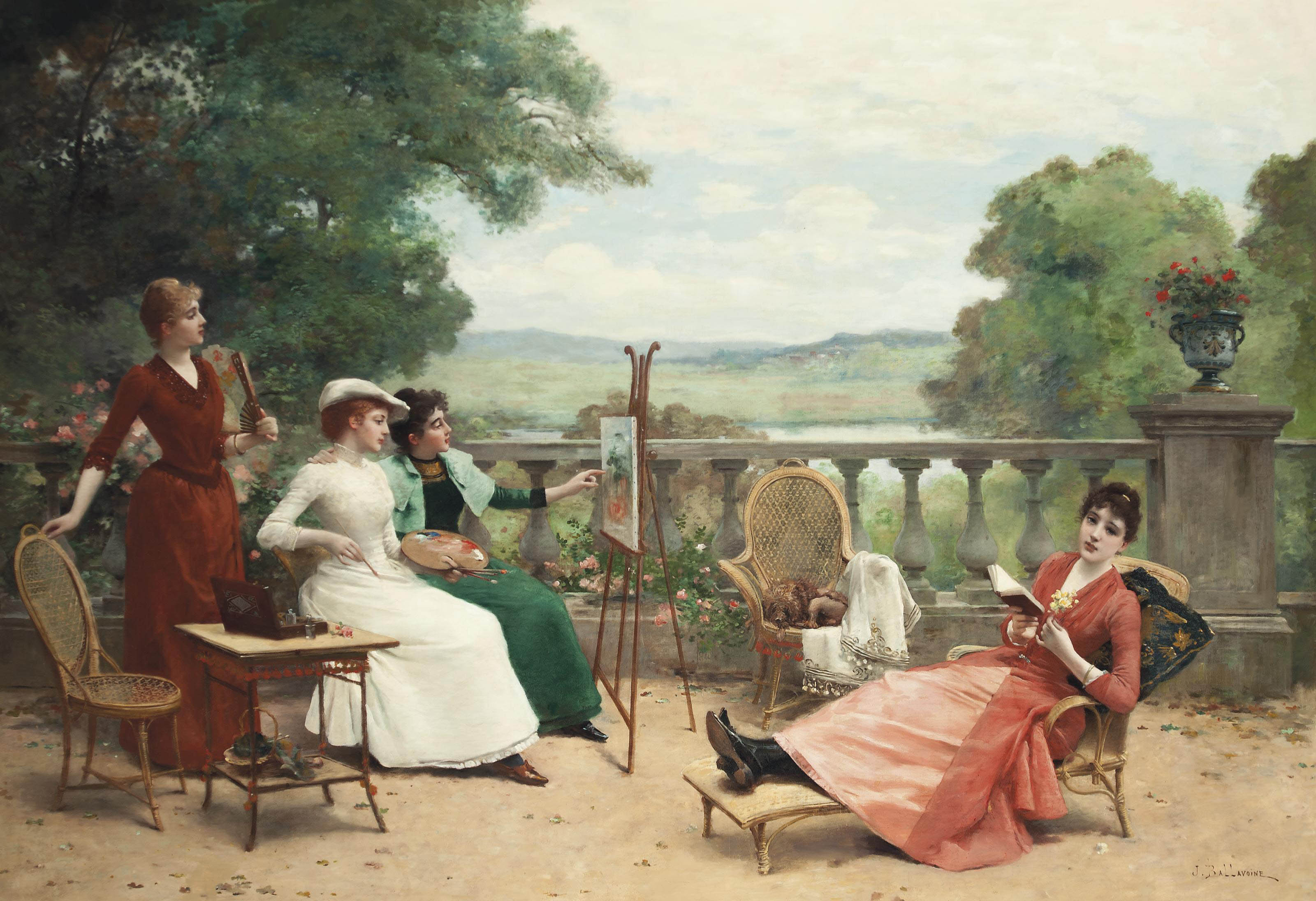
The Art Lesson

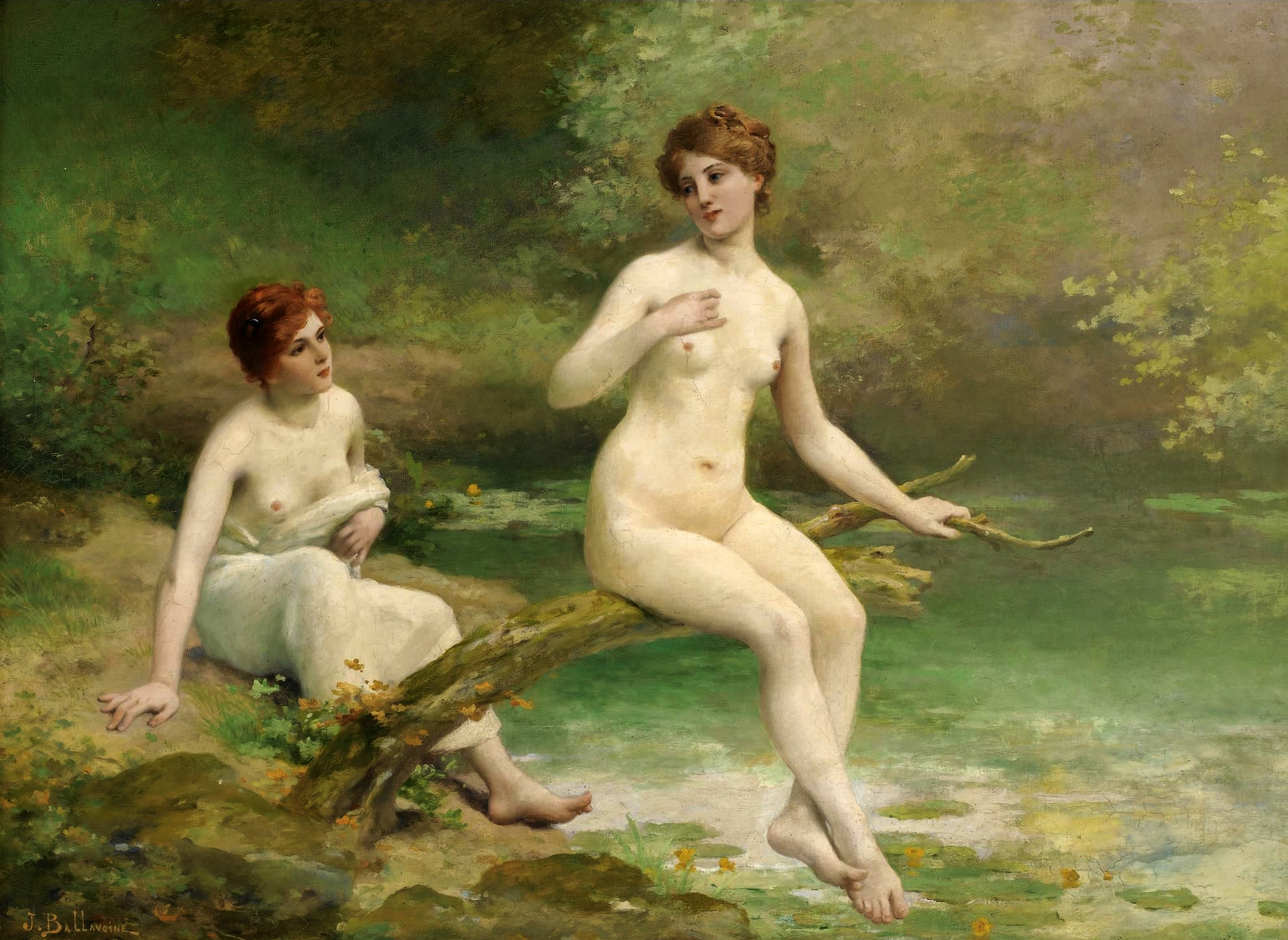
The Two Bathers

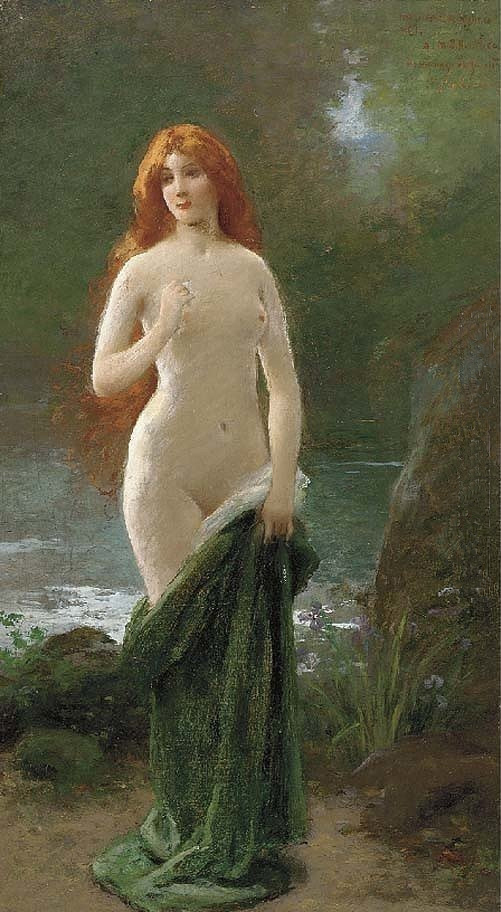
Nymphe am Waldsee

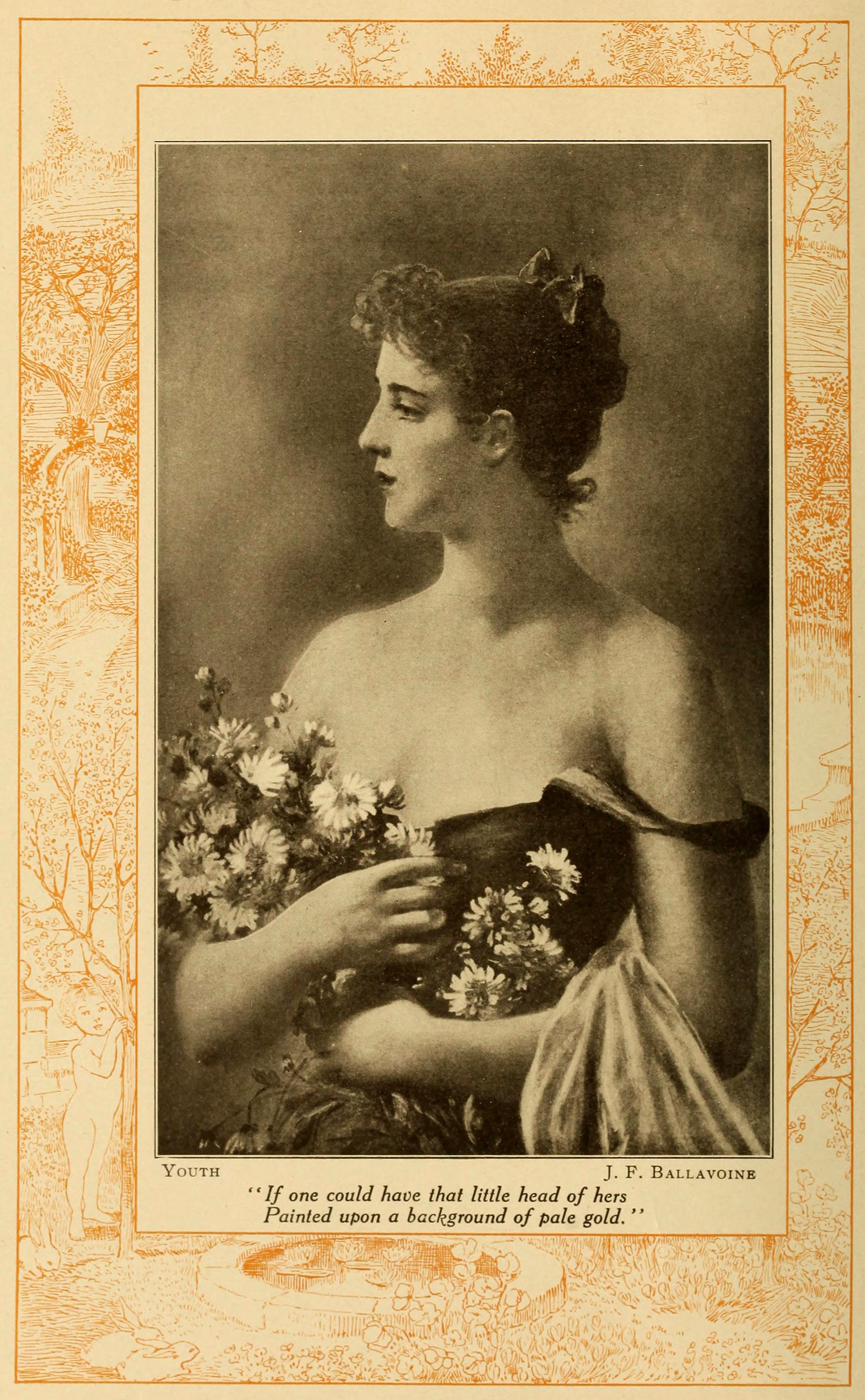
Youth

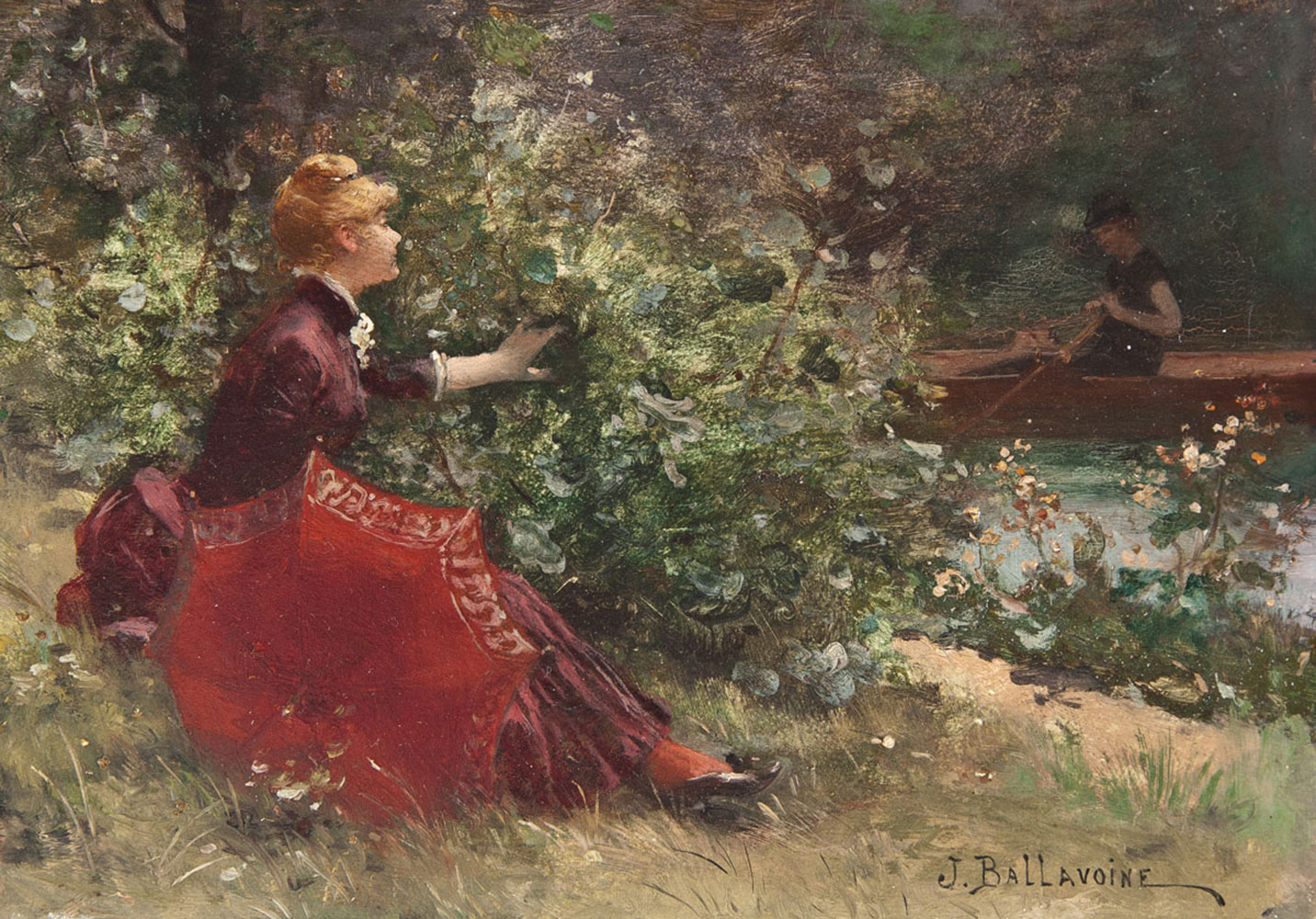
Der verborgene Blick

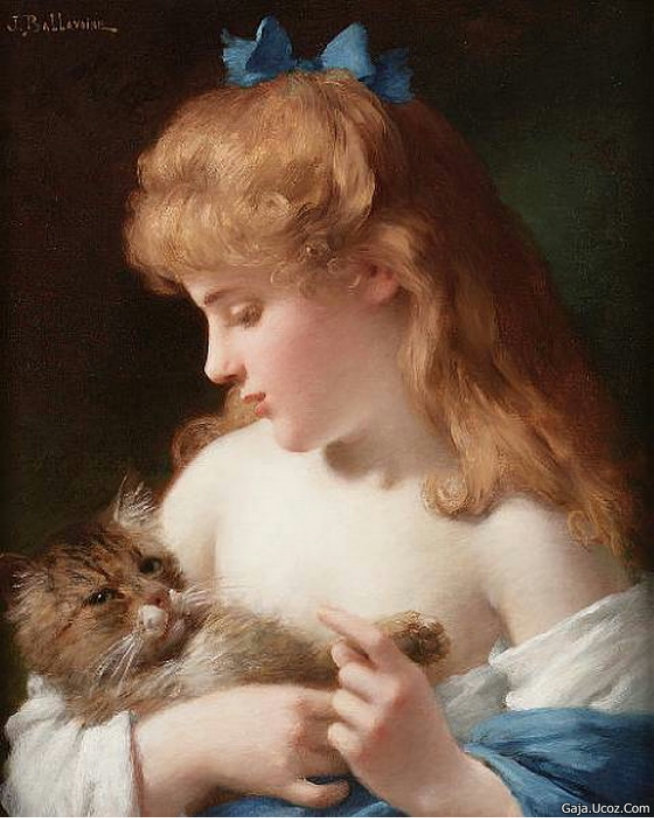
Untitled

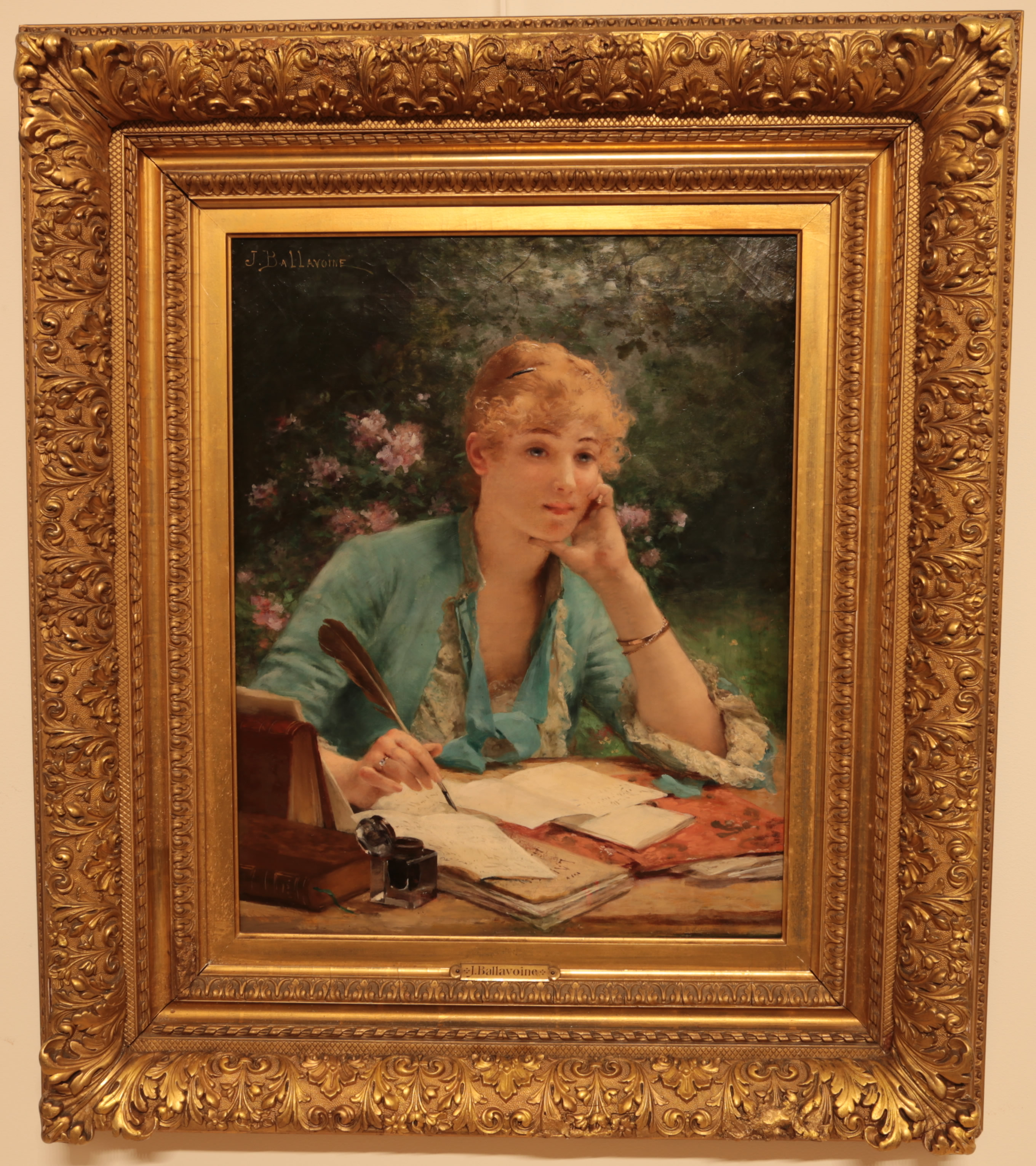
Penning a Love Letter

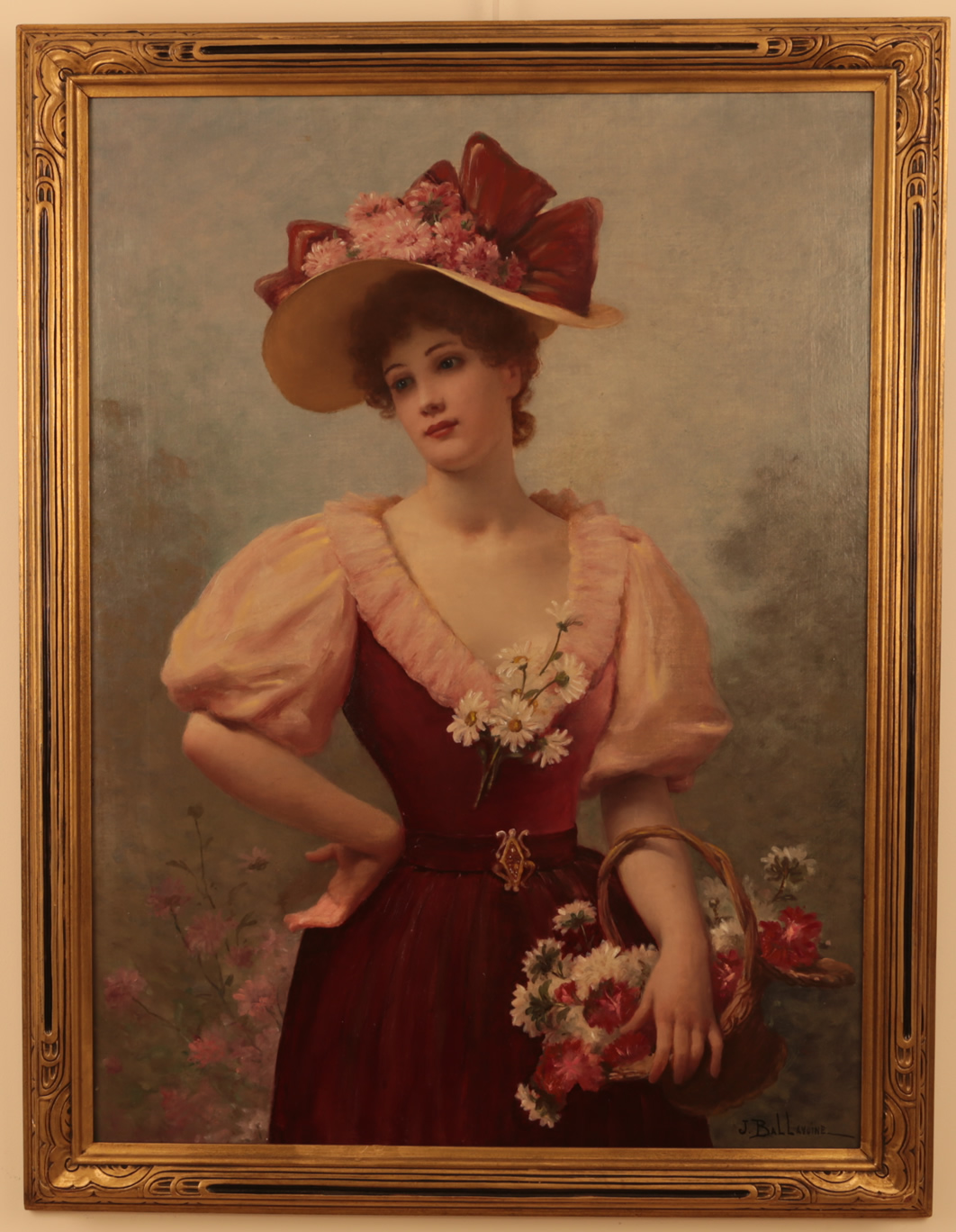
Young Woman with Flowers

== Bibliography ==
=== Primary sources ===
- Braun, Adolphe (1896). "Ballavoine (Jules-Frédéric)". In Catalogue général des reproductions inaltérables au charbon: d'après les chefs-d'œuvre de la peinture dans les musées d'Europe, les galeries et collections particulières les plus remarquables. Paris: Braun & Co. p. 19.
- Bréban, Philbert (1878). "L'Exposition universelle de 1878". In Musée universel: revue illustrée hebdomadaire illustrée, Vol. 12. No. 345–313. Paris: A. Ballue; Brussels: A. N. Lebègue & Co. p. 329.
- Lafenestre, Georges (1880). "Ballavoine (Jules-Frédéric)". In Le Livre d'or du Salon de peinture et de sculpture: catalogue descriptif des oeuvres récompensées et des principales oeuvres hors concours. Paris: Librairie des bibliophiles. pp. 19–20.
- Véron, Théodore (1877). "Ballavoine (Jules-Frédéric)". In Dictionnaire Véron, ou mémorial de l'art et des artistes. Le salon de 1877 3e annuaire. Paris: M. Bazin. p. 55.
- Explication des ouvrages de peinture et dessins, sculpture, architecture et gravure des artistes vivants, exposés au Palais des Champs-Elysées le 12 Mai 1879. Paris: Imprimerie nationale, 1879. p. IX.
- "«Méditation», tableau de Ballavoine; gravure de Rousseau". Collection Jaquet. La Gravure sur bois. Collection de gravures extraites de périodiques et de journaux illustrés du XIXe siècle. Beaux-arts: [défets d'illustrations de périodiques]. (n.d.). p. 4.
- "Annonces. Droit de suite loi du 20 mai 1920. Liste des artistes". Journal officiel de la République française, 14 March 1921. p. 3,218.
- "La Séance de plein air". Réunion des Musées Nationaux. (15 September 2014). Retrieved 25 April 2022.
- "Naissances. V3E/N 78 (51/101)". Archives de Paris. (n.d.). Retrieved 25 April 2022.

=== Secondary sources ===
- Bellier de la Chavignerie, Émile (1887). "Ballavoine (Jules-Frédéric)". In Dictionnaire général des artistes de l'école française. Supplément et table topographique. Paris: Librairie Renouard. p. 35.
- Larousse, Pierre (1875). "Rêve". In Grand dictionnaire universel du XIXe siècle, Vol. 13. Paris: Administration du Grand dictionnaire universel. p. 1,095.
- Oliver, Valerie Cassel, ed. (2011). "Ballavoine, Jules Frédéric". Benezit Dictionary of Artists. Oxford University Press. Oxford Art Online. Retrieved 3 October 2022.
- Rothamel, Jörk (2021). "Ballavoine, Jules Frédéric". In Andreas Beyer, Bénédicte Savoy, Wolf Tegethoff (eds.). Allgemeines Künstlerlexikon Online. Berlin, New York: K. G. Saur. De Gruyter.
- Schmidt, Karl Eugen (1908). "Ballavoine, Jules". In Ulrich Thieme and Felix Becker (eds.). Allgemeines Lexikon der Bildenden Künstler von der Antike bis zur Gegenwart, Vol. 2: Antonio da Monza–Bassan. Leipzig: Wilhelm Engelmann. pp. 415–416.
- Schurr, Gérald and Cabanne, Pierre (2014). "Ballavoine, Jules". In Les Petits Maîtres de la peinture (1820–1920). Paris: Éditions de l'Amateur. p. 54.
