= Kollaa =

River in Russia

Kollaa Колласйоки, Kollaanjoki
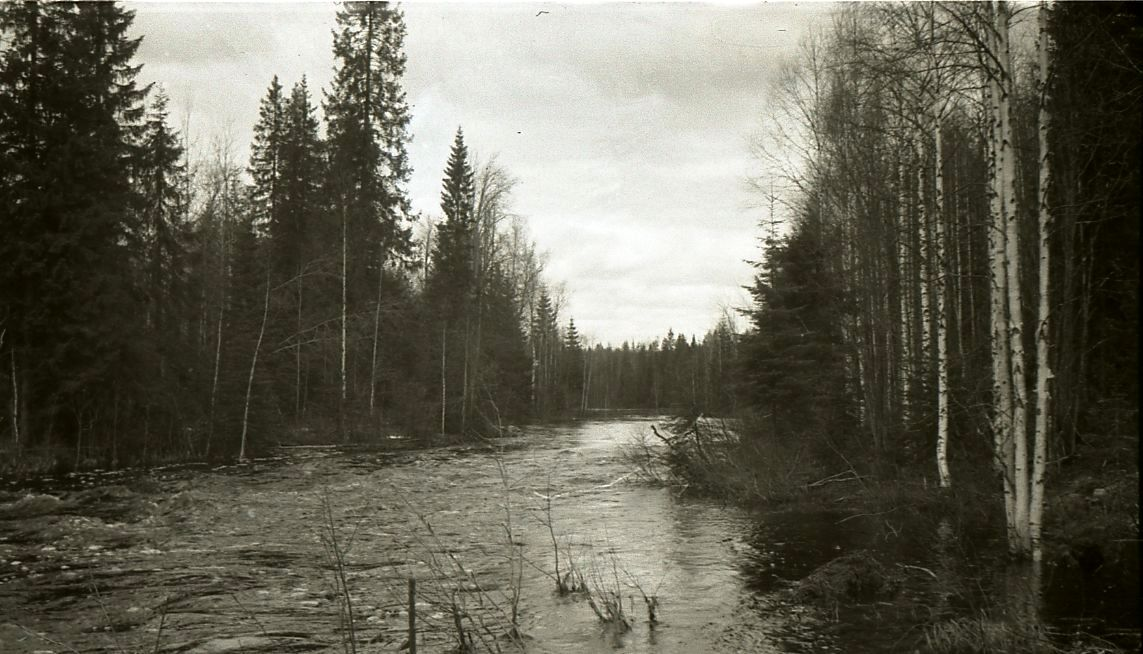
- Native name: Kollasjoki (Finnish)

Location
- Country: Russia
- Region: Republic of Karelia

Physical characteristics
- Source: Lake Kollasjärvi
  - elevation: 117 m (384 ft)
- Mouth: Lake Tulmozero
  - coordinates: 61.672°N 32.2337°E
- Length: 76 km (47 mi)

Basin features
- Progression: Lake Tulmozero→ Tulemayoki→ Lake Ladoga→ Neva→ Gulf of Finland

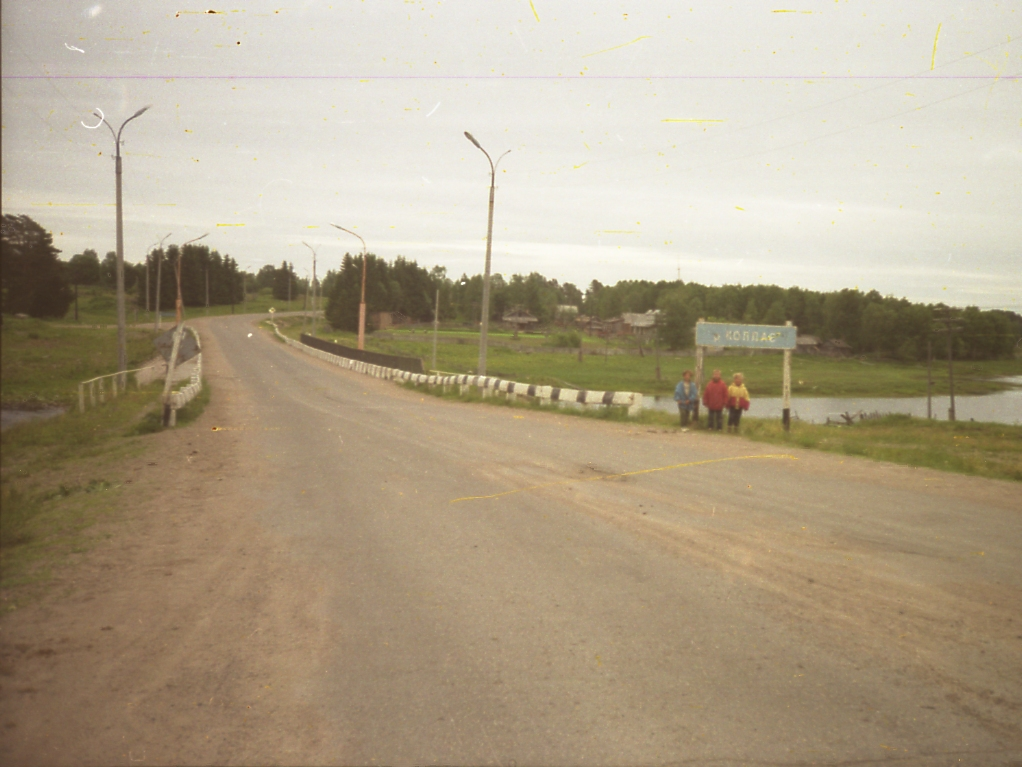
Road R21 crosses the river at Kolatselga

The Kollaa (Russian: Колласйоки, Finnish: Kollaanjoki or Kollasjoki) is a 76-kilometre (47 mi) long river in the Republic of Karelia, Russia. It starts from Lake Kollasjärvi in the Suoyarvsky District and flows to Lake Tulmozero (Finnish: Tulemajärvi) in the Pryazhinsky District.

Before World War II, the source of the river was a part of the Finnish municipality Suistamo and it flowed further through Suojärvi to Tulemajärvi on the Russian side.

== Battle ==
During the Winter War in 1939, the area was a scene of the Battle of Kollaa. The river became part of Finnish history, as the Red Army failed to break through there. A memorable quote, "Kollaa holds" (Kollaa kestää), became a legendary motto for the Finns. The river and area are associated with the exploits of the Finnish marksman Simo Häyhä, dubbed "the White Death", the gunman with the highest number of confirmed kills in any major war. Captain Aarne Juutilainen, dubbed "the Terror of Morocco", was also remarkable figure in the battle. The battle areas around the river are a preserved monument and tourist site.

The asteroid 1929 Kollaa is named after the river.
