= 6247 Amanogawa =

Main-belt asteroid

Discovery
- Discovered by: K. Endate; K. Watanabe
- Discovery site: Kitami Obs.
- Discovery date: 21 November 1990

Designations
- Named after: Amanogawa River (Japanese river)
- Alternative designations: 1990 WY_{3} · 1992 FR_{1}
- Minor planet category: main-belt · (inner) background

Orbital characteristics
- Epoch 23 March 2018 (JD 2458200.5)
- Uncertainty parameter 0
- Observation arc: 27.45 yr (10,025 d)
- Aphelion: 2.5286 AU
- Perihelion: 2.2604 AU
- Semi-major axis: 2.3945 AU
- Eccentricity: 0.0560
- Orbital period (sidereal): 3.71 yr (1,353 d)
- Mean anomaly: 168.98°
- Mean motion: 0° 15^{m} 57.6^{s} / day
- Inclination: 8.5728°
- Longitude of ascending node: 105.57°
- Argument of perihelion: 287.33°

Physical characteristics
- Mean diameter: 6.722±0.098 km 11.63 km (calculated)
- Synodic rotation period: 12.369±0.0107 h 12.38±0.02 h
- Geometric albedo: 0.057 (assumed); 0.165±0.018
- Spectral type: C (assumed); X (SDSS-MOC)
- Absolute magnitude (H): 13.2; 13.288±0.006 (R); 13.3; 13.4

6247 Amanogawa, provisional designation 1990 WY_{3}, is a background asteroid from the inner regions of the asteroid belt, approximately 7 kilometers (4 miles) in diameter. It was discovered on 21 November 1990, by Japanese amateur astronomers Kin Endate and Kazuro Watanabe at the Kitami Observatory. The X-type asteroid has a rotation period of 12.38 hours. It was named after the Amanogawa River on the island of Hokkaido, Japan.

== Orbit and classification ==
Amanogawa is a non-family asteroid from the main belt's background population. It orbits the Sun in the inner asteroid belt at a distance of 2.3–2.5 AU once every 3 years and 9 months (1,353 days; semi-major axis of 2.39 AU). Its orbit has an eccentricity of 0.06 and an inclination of 9° with respect to the ecliptic. The body's observation arc begins with a precovery at Palomar Observatory on 14 November 1990, just one week prior to its official discovery observation at Kitami.

== Physical characteristics ==
In the SDSS-based taxonomy, Amanogawa has been characterized as an X-type asteroid. It is also a generically assumed C-type asteroid.

=== Rotation period ===
In September 2008, a rotational lightcurve of Amanogawa was obtained from photometric observations at the Oakley Southern Sky Observatory and Oakley Observatory. Lightcurve analysis gave a well-defined rotation period of 12.38 hours with a brightness variation of 0.48 magnitude (U=3). In February 2014, astronomers at the Palomar Transient Factory measured a similar period of 12.369 hours and an amplitude of 0.38 magnitude in the R-band (U=2).

=== Diameter and albedo ===
According to the survey carried out by the NEOWISE mission of NASA's Wide-field Infrared Survey Explorer, Amanogawa measures 6.722 kilometers in diameter and its surface has an albedo of 0.165. The Collaborative Asteroid Lightcurve Link assumes a standard albedo for a carbonaceous asteroid of 0.057 and calculates a diameter of 11.63 kilometers based on an absolute magnitude of 13.4.

== Naming ==
This minor planet was named after the Japanese Amanogawa River that through the town of Kaminokuni on the island of Hokkaido. "Amanogawa" also means "Milky Way" in Japanese. The official naming citation was published by the Minor Planet Center on 22 February 1997 (M.P.C. 29146).
