= Kolatselga =

Kolatselga Колатсельга Kolatselgy (Karelian)
- Selo
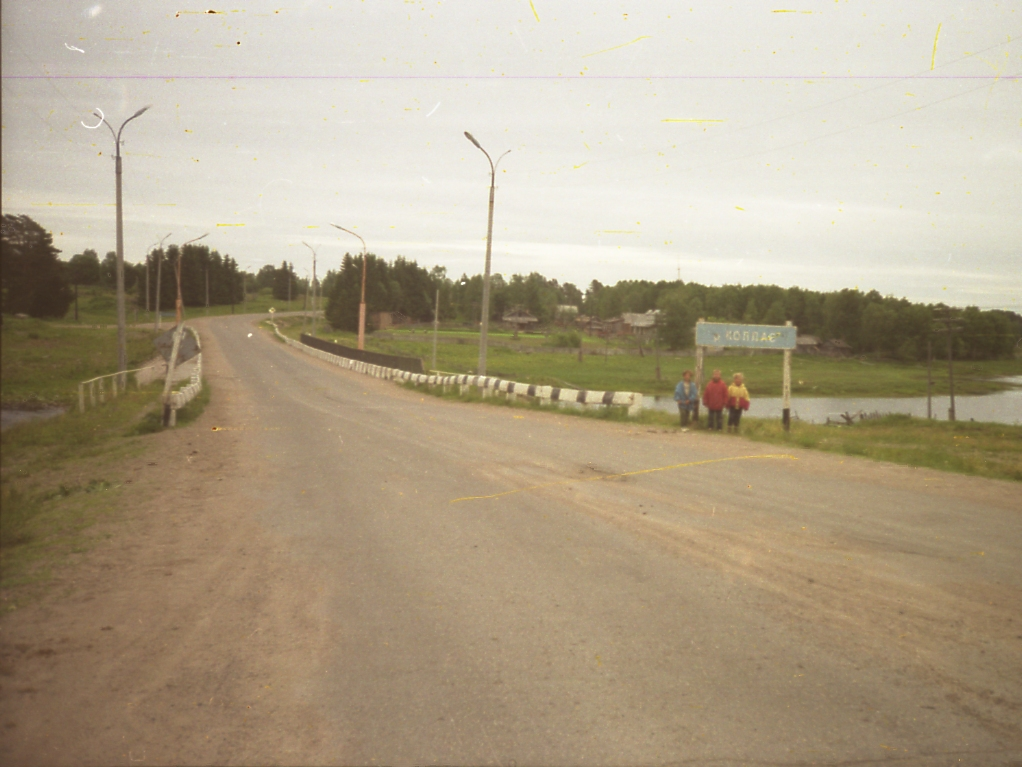
- Kollasjoki
- Interactive map of Kolatselga
- Location of Kolatselga Kolatselga (Karelia)
- Coordinates: 61°40′N 32°13′E
- Country: Russia
- Federal subject: Republic of Karelia
- Administrative district: Pryazhinsky District

Population (2010 Census)
  - Total: 114
  - Estimate (2021): 66 (−42.1%)

Municipal status
  - Municipal district: Pryazhinsky National District
  - Rural settlement: Vedlozerskoye Rural Settlement
- Time zone: UTC+3 (UTC+03:00)
- Postal code: 186148
- OKTMO ID: 86639405261

Kolatselga (Russian: Колатсельга, Karelian: Kolatselgy; Finnish: Kolatselkä) is a village within the Vedlozero rural settlement of Pryazhinsky District of the Republic of Karelia, Russia.

== General information ==
Located on the shores of Lake Tulmozero. Located at the intersection of the Kollasjoki River with the P21 motorway.

== Historical monuments ==
There are historical monuments in the village:

- The destroyed building of the Tulmozero iron smelter.
- Two mass graves of Soviet soldiers and underground workers who died during the Soviet-Finnish (1939-1940) and the Great Patriotic War. 500 people are buried in the graves, the main part of those buried are soldiers of the 7th Army of the Karelian Front. Among those buried are Hero of the Soviet Union D. I. Rakus, underground intelligence officer Tatyana Afanasyevna Ananina (1918-1942), shot by the Finnish occupiers.

== Population ==
The population in 2013 was 99.
