= 1929 Kollaa =

Vestian main-belt asteroid

Discovery
- Discovered by: Y. Väisälä
- Discovery site: Turku Obs.
- Discovery date: 20 January 1939

Designations
- Named after: Kollaa River (river in Karelia)
- Alternative designations: 1939 BS · 1939 CH; 1943 GG · 1968 BH; 1976 JF_{3}
- Minor planet category: main-belt · Vestian

Orbital characteristics
- Epoch 4 September 2017 (JD 2458000.5)
- Uncertainty parameter 0
- Observation arc: 48.64 yr (17,766 days)
- Aphelion: 2.5396 AU
- Perihelion: 2.1862 AU
- Semi-major axis: 2.3629 AU
- Eccentricity: 0.0748
- Orbital period (sidereal): 3.63 yr (1,327 days)
- Mean anomaly: 226.60°
- Mean motion: 0° 16^{m} 17.04^{s} / day
- Inclination: 7.7797°
- Longitude of ascending node: 65.429°
- Argument of perihelion: 71.220°

Physical characteristics
- Dimensions: 6.06 km (calculated); 6.71±0.34 km 7.772±0.147 km
- Synodic rotation period: 2.980±0.005 h (Note: Ryan (2007) web: rotation period 2.980±0.005 hours with a brightness amplitude of 0.22 mag. Summary figures at Collaborative Asteroid Lightcurve Link (CALL) for (1929) Kollaa from unpublished results by W. H. Ryan and E.V. Ryan, (2007).); 2.9887±0.0004 h
- Geometric albedo: 0.3855±0.0958; 0.393±0.066; 0.4 (assumed)
- Spectral type: SMASS = V · V
- Absolute magnitude (H): 12.2 · 12.50 · 12.6 · 12.64±0.32 · 12.7

1929 Kollaa, provisional designation 1939 BS, is a stony Vestian asteroid from the inner regions of the asteroid belt, approximately 7 kilometers in diameter. It was discovered by Finnish astronomer Yrjö Väisälä at Turku Observatory in Southwest Finland, on 20 January 1939. The asteroid was named after the Kollaa River in what is now Russia.

== Orbit and classification ==
Kollaa is a member of the Vesta family. Vestian asteroids have a composition akin to cumulate eucrite meteorites and are thought to have originated deep within 4 Vesta's crust, possibly from the Rheasilvia crater, a large impact crater on its southern hemisphere near the South pole, formed as a result of a subcatastrophic collision. The asteroid Vesta is the main-belt's second-most-massive body after 1 Ceres.

The asteroid orbits the Sun in the inner main-belt at a distance of 2.2–2.5 AU once every 3 years and 8 months (1,327 days). Its orbit has an eccentricity of 0.07 and an inclination of 8° with respect to the ecliptic. As no precoveries were taken, the asteroid's observation arc begins with its discovery.

== Physical characteristics ==
In the SMASS taxonomy, Kollaa is a bright V-type asteroid.

=== Lightcurves ===
It has a well-defined rotation period of 2.98 hours, derived from two rotational lightcurve analysis. In March 2004, photometric observations at the U.S. Magdalena Ridge Observatory in New Mexico rendered a period of 2.980 hours with a brightness variation of 0.20 in magnitude (U=3). In 2008 a second, concurring period was obtained by French amateur astronomer Pierre Antonini at his private Observatoire de Bédoin in France (132). It gave a period of 2.9887 hours and an amplitude 0.22 in magnitude (U=3).

=== Diameter and albedo ===
According to the surveys carried out by NASA's Wide-field Infrared Survey Explorer and its subsequent NEOWISE mission, the body measures 6.7 and 7.7 kilometers in diameter, respectively, and its surface has an albedo 0.39. while the Collaborative Asteroid Lightcurve Link assumes an albedo of 0.40 and calculates a diameter of 6.4 kilometers with an absolute magnitude of 12.7.

== Naming ==
This minor planet is named after the Kollaa River in Karelia, the focal point of violent battles during the Finnish Winter War (1939–40). The official naming citation was published by the Minor Planet Center on 1 August 1980 (M.P.C. 5450).
