= Amanogawa (river) =

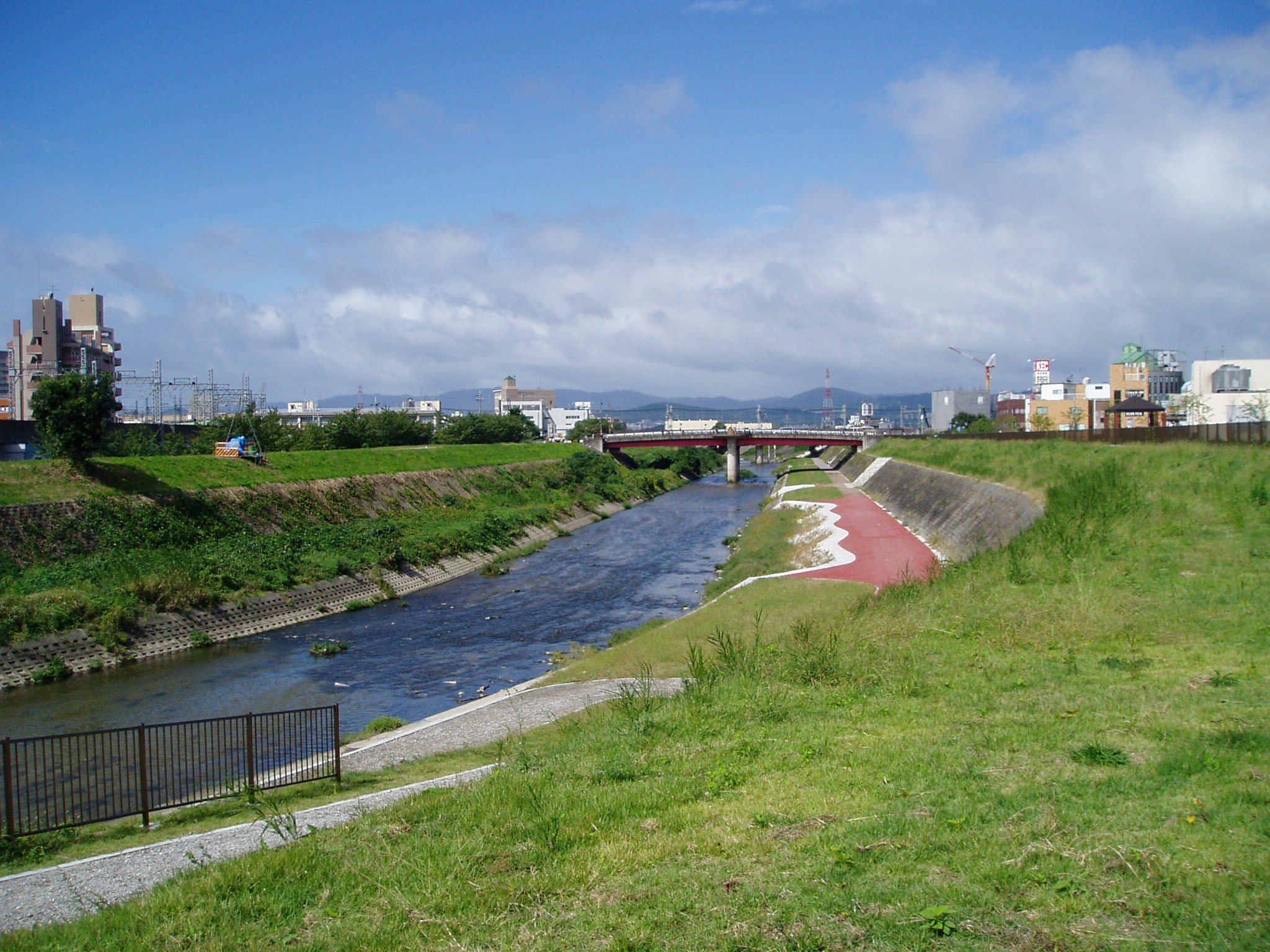

- Location within Japan
- Etymology: Heavenly River
- Native name: 天の川 (Japanese)

Location
- Country: Japan
- Prefecture: Osaka Prefecture

Physical characteristics
- Mouth
  - location: Osaka Bay
- Length: 14.9 kilometre

The Amanogawa (Japanese: 天の川), Amano-gawa or Amano is a river in Japan, which passes through Hirakata, near Osaka. The name means "heavenly river", and is also the Japanese name for the Milky Way.

The river empties into the Yodo River.
