= Jaci (river) =

River at the foot of Mount Etna, destroyed by eruptions

The Jaci or Aci (Sicilian: Ciumi di Aci or [Eastern Sicilian] Jaci; Italian: Fiume di Aci or Jaci; Latin: Acis; Ancient Greek: Ἄκις, romanized: Ákis) was a river of Sicily, Italy on the eastern coast of the island, and immediately at the foot of Mount Etna.

== History ==
It rose under a rock of lava, and had a very short course to the sea at Acireale (ancient Acium). It is celebrated on account of the mythological fable connected with its origin, which was ascribed to the blood of the youthful Acis, crushed under an enormous rock by his rival Polyphemus. It is evidently in allusion to the same story that Theocritus speaks of the "sacred waters of Acis." From this fable itself we may infer that it was a small stream gushing forth from under a rock; the extreme coldness of its waters noticed by Solinus also points to the same conclusion. There is every appearance that the town of Acium derived its name from the river. The river disappeared during the middle ages due to lava eruptions from Etna.
