= Yrjö-Koskinen =

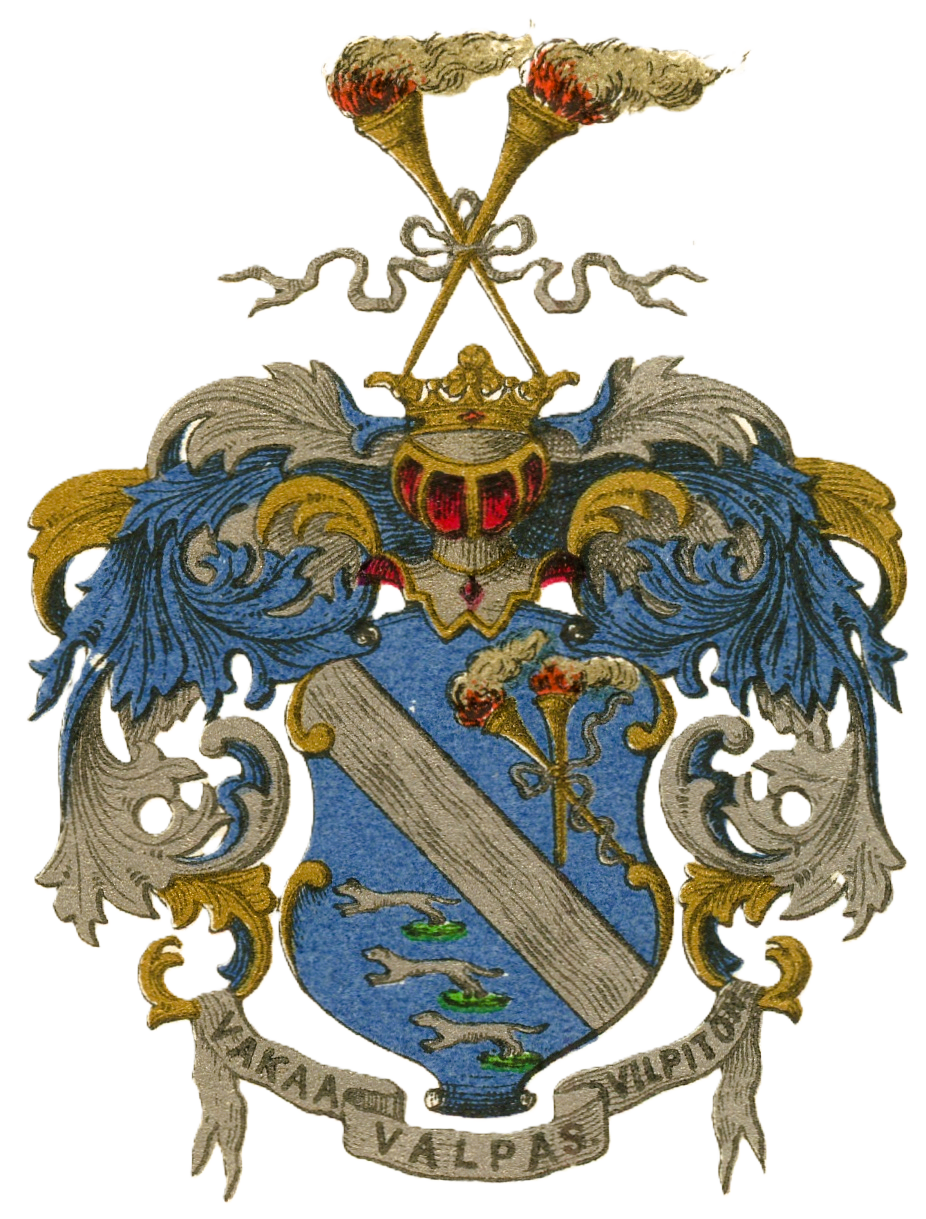
Coat of arms of the Yrjö-Koskinen family

The Yrjö-Koskinen family is a Finnish noble family of Swedish descent, formerly known as Forsman, granted noble status in 1882. Members of the family held the title of Baron.

== Notable members ==
- Baron Yrjö Sakari Yrjö-Koskinen (1830–1903) (originally known as Georg Zakarias Forsman), senator and professor, ennobled in 1882
- Sofia Theodolinda Yrjö-Koskinen, playwright, wife of Y. S. Yrjö-Koskinen
- Yrjö Yrjö-Koskinen (1854–1917), senator, elder son of Y. S. Yrjö-Koskinen
- Sakari Yrjö-Koskinen (1858–1916), rector, member of parliament, younger son of Y. S. Yrjö-Koskinen
- Iida Yrjö-Koskinen (1857–1937), member of parliament, wife of Sakari Yrjö-Koskinen
- Lauri Yrjö-Koskinen (1867–1936), landowner and politician
- Aarno Yrjö-Koskinen (1885–1951), ambassador, foreign minister, son of Yrjö Yrjö-Koskinen
- Kaarlo Juhana Yrjö-Koskinen (1930–2007), ambassador
