= Maynilo =

Maynilo Майнило
- Rural locality
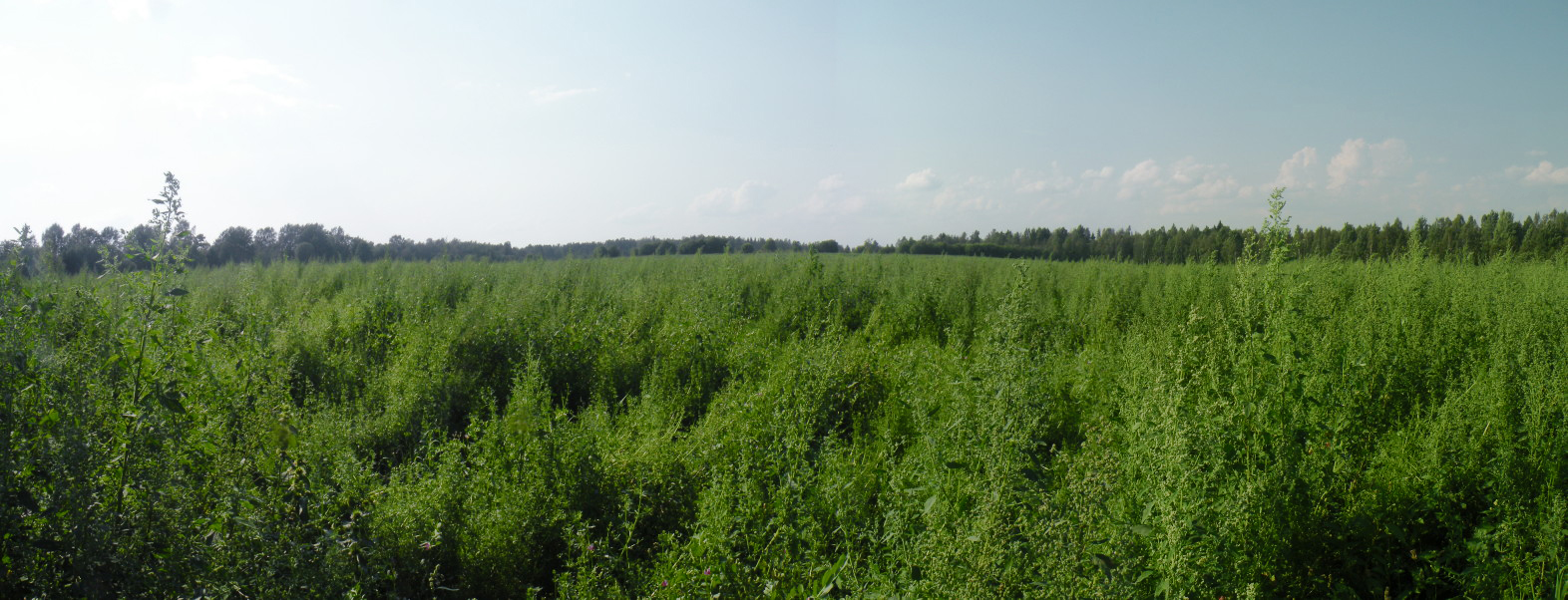
- Meadow at the pre-war Soviet–Finnish border

- Location within Leningrad Oblast Location within Russia
- Coordinates: 60.248°N 29.859°E
- Country: Russia
- Region: Leningrad Oblast
- District: Vyborgsky District
- Rural settlement: Pervomayskoye Rural Settlement

Population (2017)
  - Total: 14
- Time zone: UTC+3:00

Maynilo (Russian: Майнило, Finnish: Mainila) is a rural locality (posyolok) in the Pervomayskoye Rural Settlement of Vyborgsky District, Leningrad Oblast, Russia. As of 2017, it had an estimated population of 14.

Maynilo was first mentioned c. 1500. According to Saulo Kepsu, the name of the village is derived from an Izhorian form of the given name Manuil.

In 1848, according to Peter von Köppen, the village of Maynelova along the Sestra river had a population of 129, all of whom were Ingrian Finns of the Savakko subgroup. The villagers were members of the Lutheran parish of Beloostrov. In 1905, the village was part of the volost of Beloostrov and had a population of 186.

After Finland declared independence from Russia in 1917, the village lay on the Russian side of the national border. In the early Soviet period, Maynilovo was initially part of the Novaya Alakyulya selsoviet and, after 1931, the Krasnoostrov selsoviet, both of which were Finnish national selsoviets. All national selsoviets in the Leningrad Oblast were abolished in 1939.

The Shelling of Mainila, the incident that started the Winter War, took place in Maynilo on 26 November 1939. After the war, Maynilo was part of the selsoviet of Haapala (renamed Leninskoye in 1948), whose center had until then been part of the Finnish municipality of Terijoki.
