= Yrjö Yrjö-Koskinen =

Finnish educator, civil servant and politician (1854–1917)

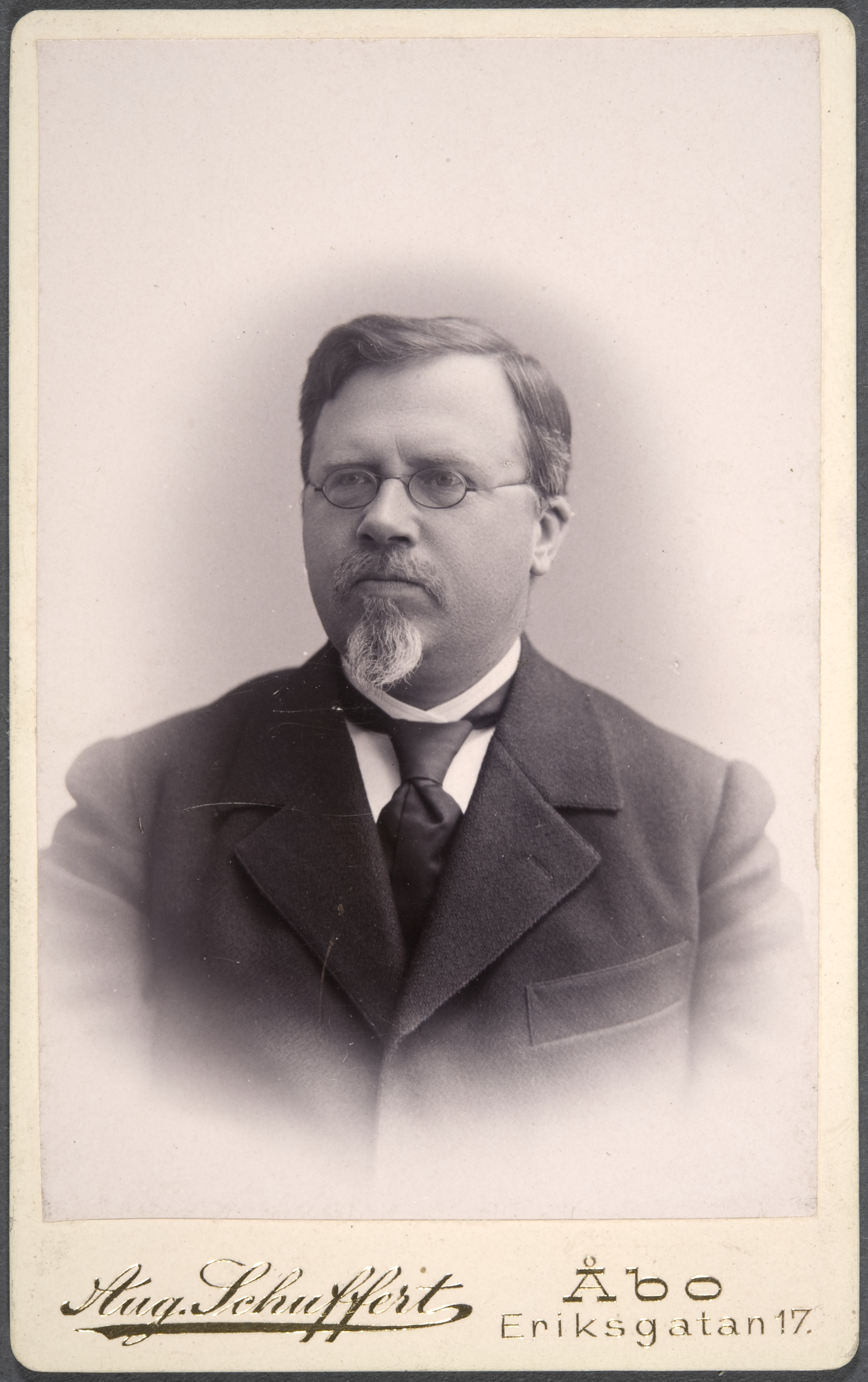
Yrjö Koskinen Yrjö-Koskinen

Baron, Active State Councillor Yrjö Koskinen (Y. K.) Yrjö-Koskinen (2 November 1854 – 12 January 1917; surname until 1882 Forsman) was a Finnish educator, civil servant and politician, born in Jakobstad. He was a member of the Diet of Finland in 1885, 1894, 1897, 1899, 1900, from 1904 to 1905 and from 1905 to 1906 and of the Parliament of Finland from 1907 to 1909 and from 1910 to 1911, representing the Finnish Party. He was a member of the Senate of Finland from 1908 to 1909. Yrjö Yrjö-Koskinen was the son of Yrjö Sakari Yrjö-Koskinen, the elder brother of Sakari Yrjö-Koskinen and the father of Aarno Yrjö-Koskinen.
