= Shelling of Mainila =

1939 false flag attack by the Soviet Union against Finland, leading to the Winter War

Coordinates: 60°15′08″N 29°51′12″E

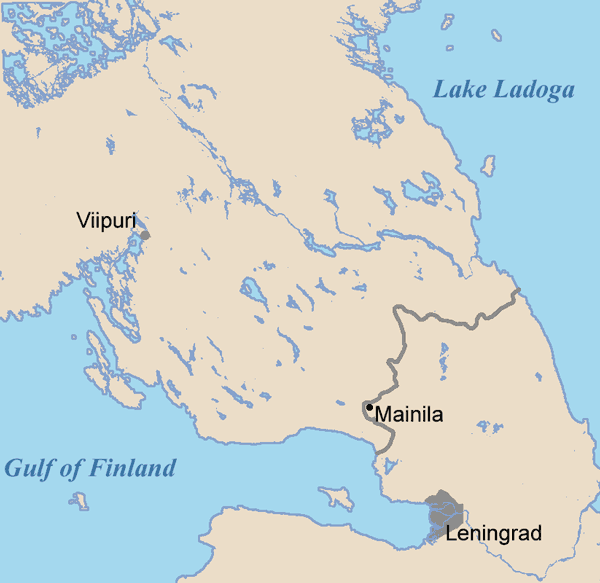
Location of Mainila on the Karelian Isthmus shown in relation to the pre-war Finnish-Soviet border

The Shelling of Mainila (Finnish: Mainilan laukaukset, Swedish: Skotten i Mainila), or the Mainila incident (Russian: Майнильский инцидент, romanized: Maynilskiy intsident), was a military incident on 26 November 1939 in which the Soviet Union's Red Army shelled the Soviet border village of Mainila (Russian: Майнило, romanized: Maynilo) near Beloostrov. The Soviet Union declared that the fire originated from Finland across the nearby border and claimed to have had losses in personnel. Through that false flag operation, the Soviet Union gained a great propaganda boost and a casus belli for launching the Winter War four days later. Historians have now concluded that the shelling of Mainila was a fabrication carried out by the Soviet NKVD state security agency.

== Background ==
The Soviet Union had signed international and mutual nonaggression treaties with Finland: the Treaty of Tartu of 1920, the Non-aggression Pact between Finland and the Soviet Union signed in 1932 and again in 1934, and further the Charter of the League of Nations. The Soviet government attempted to adhere to a tradition of legalism, and a casus belli was required for war. Earlier in the same year, Nazi Germany had staged the similar Gleiwitz incident to generate an excuse to withdraw from its nonaggression pact with Poland. Also the Soviet war games held in March 1938 and 1939 had been based on a scenario where border incidents taking place at the village of Mainila would have sparked the war.

== The incident ==
Seven shots were fired, and three Finnish observation posts detected their fall. These witnesses estimated that the shells detonated approximately 800 meters (2,600 ft) inside Soviet territory. Finland proposed a neutral investigation of the incident, but the Soviet Union refused and broke diplomatic relations with Finland on November 29. Materials in the private archives of Soviet party leader Andrei Zhdanov show that the incident was orchestrated to paint Finland as an aggressor and launch an offensive. The Finnish side denied responsibility for the attacks and identified Soviet artillery as their source—indeed, the war diaries of nearby Finnish artillery batteries show that Mainila was out of range of all of them, as they had been withdrawn to prevent such incidents. The Soviet Union then renounced the non-aggression pact with Finland and, on 30 November 1939, launched the first offensives of the Winter War.

== Aftermath ==
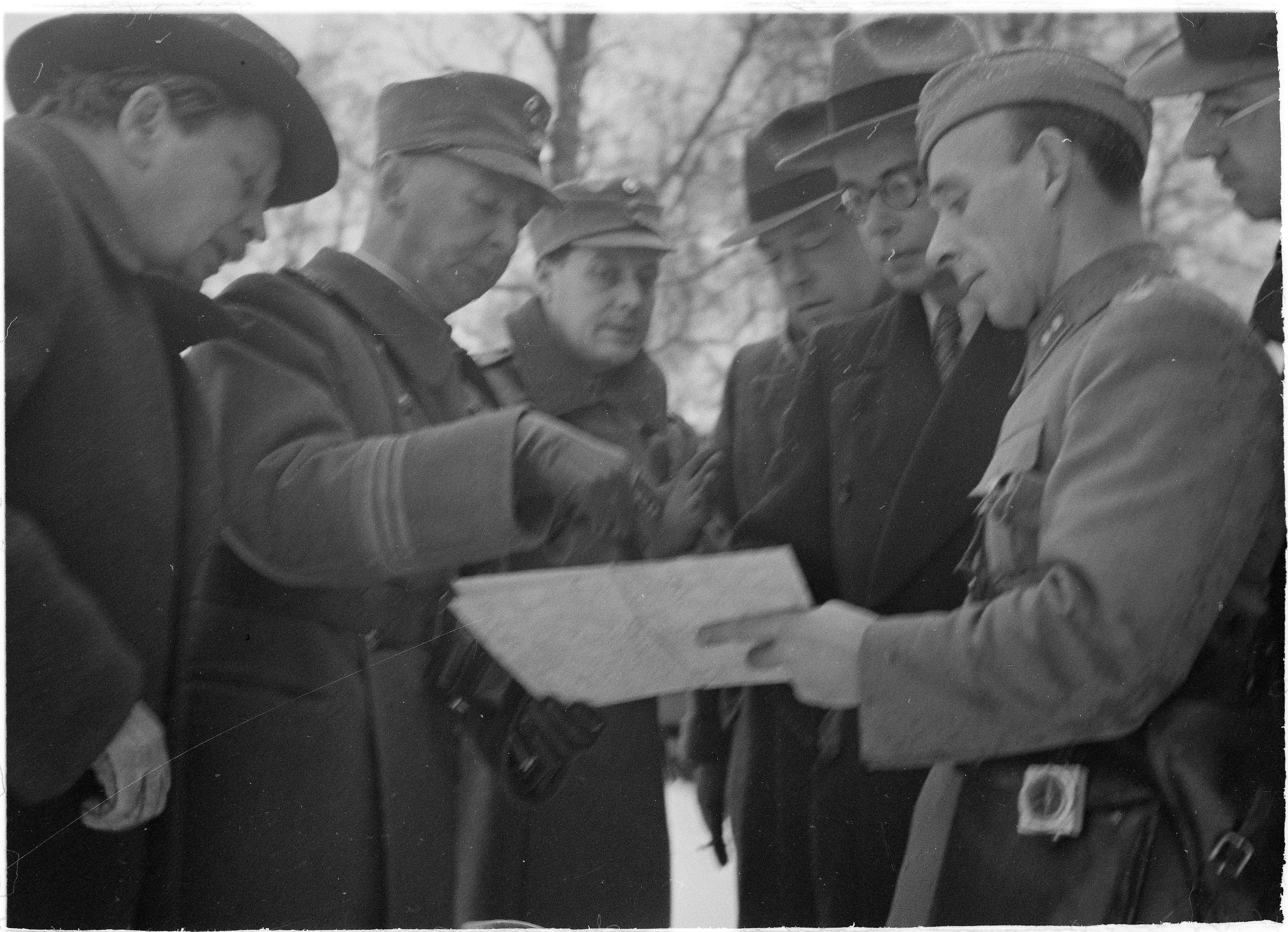
Foreign journalists in Mainila on 29 November 1939

John Gunther, an American journalist and author wrote in December 1939 that the incident "was as clumsy and obviously fabricated as all such 'incidents' have been since Mukden in 1931". The Finns conducted an immediate investigation, which concluded that no Finnish artillery or mortars could have reached the village of Mainila. Field Marshal C.G.E. Mannerheim had ordered all Finnish guns drawn back out of range. Finnish border guards testified they had heard the sound of artillery fire from the Soviet side of the border. Russian historian Pavel Aptekar analyzed declassified Soviet military documents and found that the daily reports from troops in the area did not report any losses in personnel during the time period in question, leading him to conclude that the shelling of Soviet troops was staged.

In his 1970 memoir, Soviet premier Nikita Khrushchev wrote on the start of the Winter War: "We had fired our salvo, and the Finns had replied with artillery fire of their own. De facto, the war had begun. There is, of course, another version of the facts: it's said that the Finns started shooting first and that we were compelled to shoot back. It's always like that when people start a war. They say, "You fired the first shot," or "You slapped me first, and I'm only hitting back." On 18 May 1994, Russian president Boris Yeltsin denounced the Winter War, saying it had been a war of aggression.

== 1941 Finnish shelling of Mainila ==
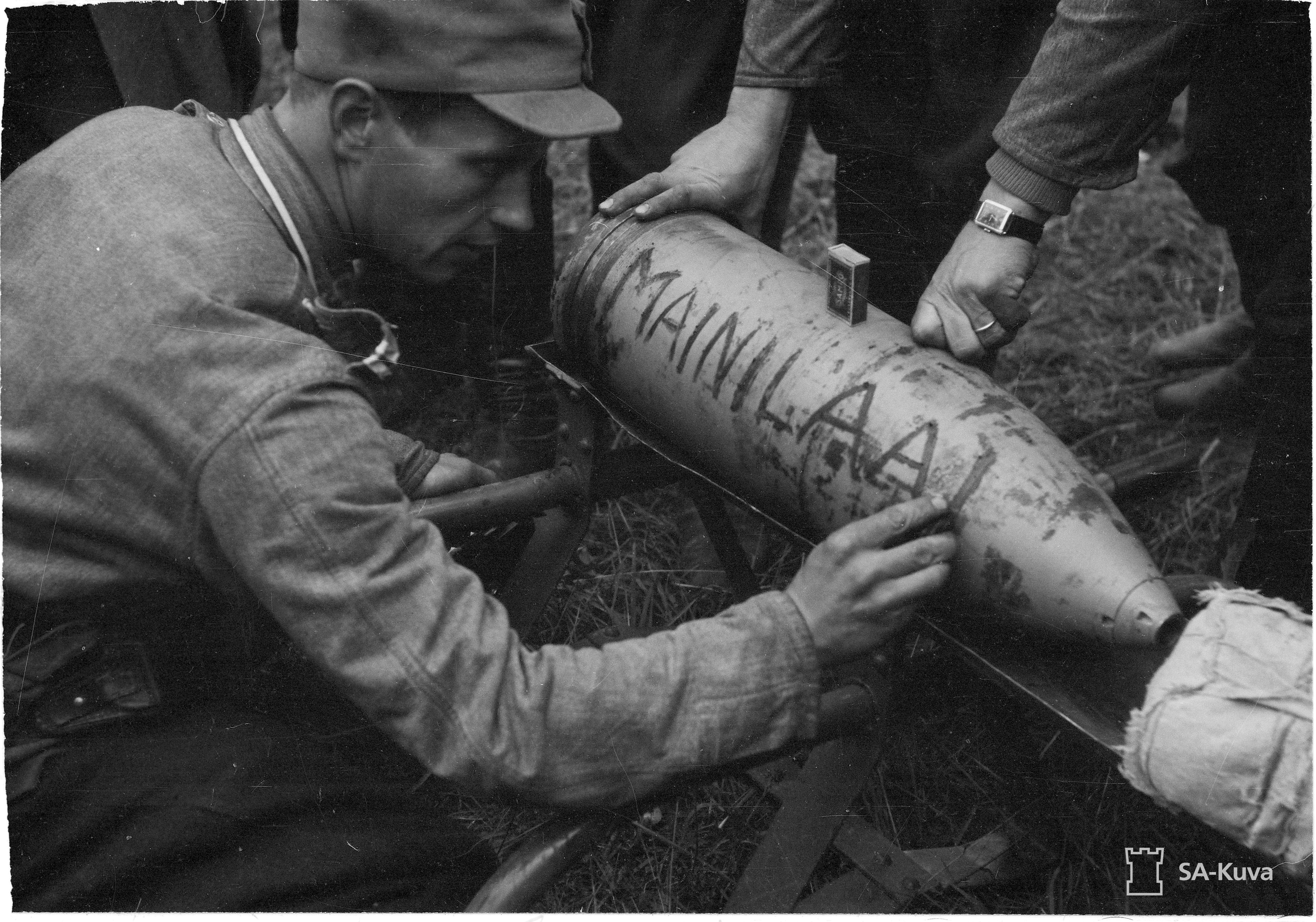
Men of the 18th Division of the Finnish Army writing an "address" on shells on 31 August 1941 before the 1941 shelling of Mainila

During the Continuation War, the 18th Division of the Finnish Army reached Rajajoki on 31 August 1941 and started preparations for taking the village of Mainila. Their division commander Colonel Pajari recognized the propaganda value and arranged for an artillery strike on the village to be witnessed by combat camera personnel, and the village was taken a couple of days later. In his report to HQ in Mikkeli, Pajari stated that "on 31st August 1941 the 18th division conducted the Shelling of Mainila."

== See also ==
- Background of the Winter War
- Gleiwitz incident
- Molotov–Ribbentrop Pact
- Mukden Incident – another false flag attack
- Operation Himmler
