= Soviet–Finnish Non-Aggression Pact =

1932 treaty between Finland and the Soviet Union

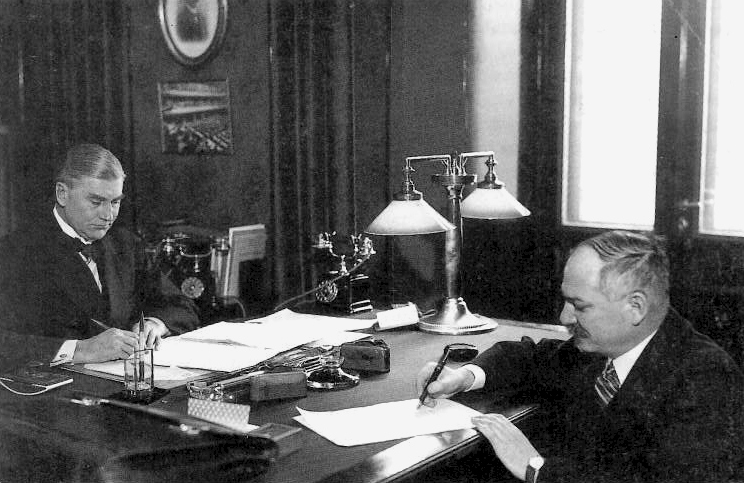
The signing of the non-aggression pact in Helsinki on 21 January 1932. On the left is Finnish Foreign Minister Aarno Yrjö-Koskinen, and on the right is Soviet Ambassador Ivan Maisky.

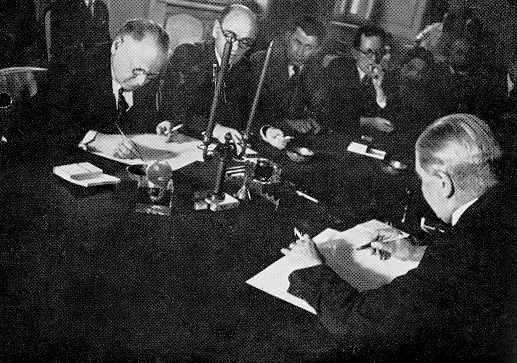
The pact was extended to 31 December 1945 in Moscow on 7 April 1934.

The Soviet–Finnish Non-Aggression Pact was a non-aggression pact that was signed in 1932 by representatives of the Soviet Union and Finland and updated on 7 April 1934.

The pact was unilaterally renounced by the Soviet Union in 1939 after it had shelled one of its villages and blamed Finland in a false-flag attack.

== Negotiations ==
The Soviet Union had started negotiations regarding non-aggression pacts with its neighbouring European countries to secure its borders during the Japanese invasion of Manchuria. The negotiations between it and Finland started last but ended first. The non-aggression pact was signed by Finnish Foreign Minister Aarno Yrjö-Koskinen and Soviet Ambassador Ivan Maisky on 22 January 1932 at the Finnish Ministry of Foreign Affairs, in Helsinki. It was ratified by the Parliament of Finland in July 1932 only after representatives of Estonia, Latvia and Lithuania had signed their own non-aggression pacts with the Soviet Union.

== Terms ==
Both Finland and the Soviet Union agreed to respect each other's borders and to stay neutral in each other's conflicts. Disputes were to be solved peacefully and neutrally. The Soviet Union proposed a ten-year period of validity in the spring of 1934 and wanted Finland, Estonia, Latvia and Lithuania to give a joint answer. Finland was the last of those four countries to agree to the pact because of slight differences in its agreements with the Soviet Union. The pact was extended to 31 December 1945 in Moscow on 7 April 1934. The extension was signed by Finnish Foreign Minister Aarno Yrjö-Koskinen and Soviet Foreign Minister Maxim Litvinov.

== Renuciation ==
The pact was renounced by the Soviet Union on 28 November 1939, two days before its invasion of Finland began. The Soviet Union claimed that Finland had shelled one of its villages, but it was later proved that the Soviets had really done the shelling in a false-flag attack.

According to Article 5 of the pact, both parties were to call for a joint commission to examine the incident. Finland tried to call one, but the Soviet Union refused.

== See also ==
- Treaty of Tartu
- Soviet–Polish Non-Aggression Pact
- Franco-Soviet Treaty of Mutual Assistance
- German–Polish declaration of non-aggression
