= Sakari Yrjö-Koskinen =

Finnish educator and politician (1858–1916)

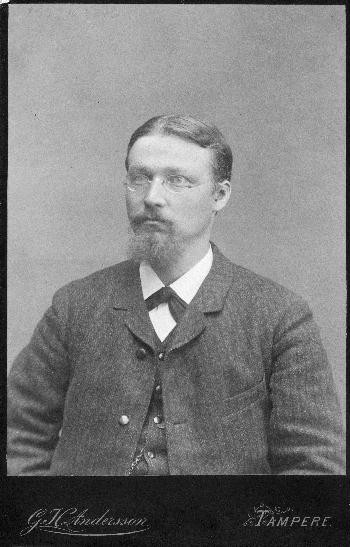

Member of the Diet of Finland
- In office 1897

Member of the Finnish Parliament for Pirkanmaa
- In office 1907–1916

Personal details
- Born: 3 October 1858 Hämeenkyrö, Finland
- Died: 10 January 1916 (aged 57) Helsinki, Finland
- Party: Finnish Party
- Spouse: Iida Yrjö-Koskinen
- Parent: Yrjö Sakari Yrjö-Koskinen (father)
- Occupation: educator

Baron Eino Sakari (E. S.) Yrjö-Koskinen (3 October 1858 – 10 January 1916; surname until 1882 Forsman) was a Finnish educator and politician, born in Hämeenkyrö. He was a member of the Diet of Finland in 1897 and of the Parliament of Finland from 1907 until his death in 1916, representing the Finnish Party. Sakari Yrjö-Koskinen was the son of Yrjö Sakari Yrjö-Koskinen and the younger brother of Yrjö Yrjö-Koskinen.
