= Aarno Yrjö-Koskinen =

Finnish politician (1885–1951)

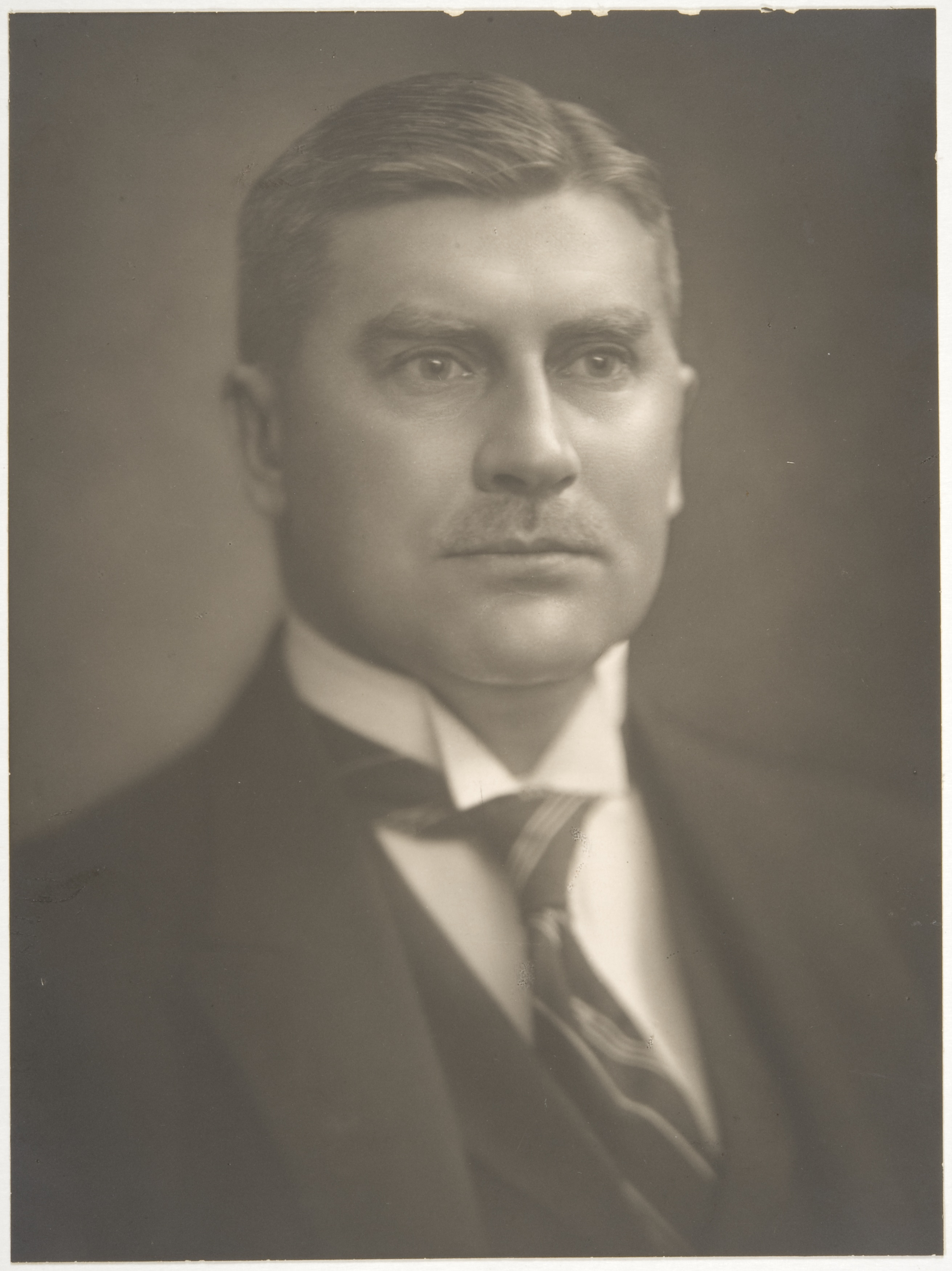

Minister of Foreign Affairs of Finland
- In office 21 March 1931 – 14 December 1932
- Prime Minister: Juho Sunila
- Preceded by: Hjalmar J. Procopé
- Succeeded by: Antti Hackzell

Finnish ambasador to the Soviet Union
- In office 1 January 1931 – 8 April 1940
- Preceded by: Pontus Artti
- Succeeded by: Juho Kusti Paasikivi

Personal details
- Born: 9 December 1885 Helsinki, Grand Duchy of Finland
- Died: 8 June 1951 (aged 65) Helsinki, Finland
- Resting place: Hietaniemi Cemetery
- Party: National Coalition Party
- Education: Imperial Alexander University
- Profession: Diplomat, civil servant

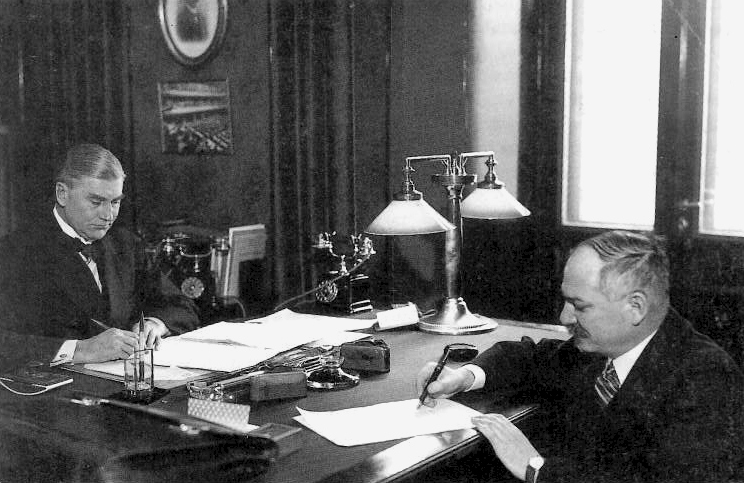
The Soviet–Finnish Non-Aggression Pact signed in Helsinki on 21 January 1932. On the left the Finnish foreign minister Aarno Yrjö-Koskinen, and on the right the Envoy of the Soviet Union in Helsinki Ivan Maisky.

Aarno Armas Sakari Yrjö-Koskinen (9 December 1885, Helsinki – 8 June 1951, Helsinki) was a Finnish politician, Envoy and freiherr. He graduated as jurist and received the title varatuomari in 1915.

After the Finnish independence in 1917, Yrjö-Koskinen served under the Ministry for Foreign Affairs as Chief of political division from 1924 and Chief of staff from 1929. He worked as an Envoy in Moscow between 1 January 1931 and 8 April 1940.

Yrjö-Koskinen also served as the Minister of Foreign Affairs between 21 March 1931 and 15 December 1932. During his ministry Yrjö-Koskinen signed on behalf of Finland the Soviet–Finnish Non-Aggression Pact with the Soviet Union. At beginning of the Winter War he moved from Moscow to the Finnish embassy in Ankara. Yrjö-Koskinen served in Turkey till 1950, and yet a small time in The Hague, the Netherlands.

Yrjö-Koskinen's father was the Finnish senator Yrjö Yrjö-Koskinen and grandfather was senator and historian Yrjö Sakari Yrjö-Koskinen.

Political offices
Preceded by Hjalmar Procopé	Foreign Minister of Finland; 1931–1932	Succeeded by Antti Hackzell
