= Ivan Maisky =

Soviet diplomat (1884–1975)

- Иван Майский
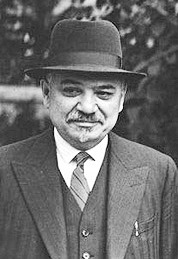
- Maisky in 1941

Soviet ambassador to the United Kingdom
- In office 15 October 1932 – 12 August 1943
- Preceded by: Grigory Sokolnikov
- Succeeded by: Fedor Gusev

Personal details
- Born: 19 January 1884 Kirillov, Russian Empire
- Died: 3 September 1975 (aged 91) Moscow, RSFSR
- Party: Communist Party of the Soviet Union
- Education: Ludwig-Maximilians-Universität München
- Profession: Diplomat, civil servant

Ivan Mikhailovich Maisky (Russian: Ива́н Миха́йлович Ма́йский; 19 January 1884 – 3 September 1975) was a Soviet diplomat, historian and politician who served as the Soviet Union's ambassador to the United Kingdom from 1932 to 1943, including much of the period of the Second World War.

== Early career ==
Ivan Maisky was born Jan Lachowiecki in a nobleman's castle in Kirillov, near Nizhny Novgorod, where his father was working as a private tutor. His father was a Polish Jew who was a convert to Orthodox Christianity; his mother was Russian. He spent his childhood in Omsk, where his father worked as a military doctor.

Maisky's youth was very strongly influenced by the humanism of the Russian intelligentsia, and his favorite authors as a young man were William Shakespeare, Friedrich Schiller, Heinrich Heine and Lord Byron. Maisky's values were shaped by growing up in an atheist, bookish and intellectual family who read the works of Alexander Herzen and Nikolay Chernyshevsky. Like much of the Russian intelligentsia, the Maisky family were opposed to the social order of Imperial Russia and saw serving "the people" as the highest virtue.

As a student at St. Petersburg University, he was profoundly influenced by the writings of Sidney and Beatrice Webb. While at university, he wrote poetry with his first poem being "I Wish To Be a Great Thunderstorm". In 1902, he was arrested for his political activities, and sent back to Omsk under police surveillance. In 1903 Maisky joined the Menshevik faction of the Russian Social Democratic Labour Party. In January 1906 he was arrested for his part in the 1905 revolution and deported to Tobolsk. His sentence was later commuted and he was allowed to immigrate to Munich, where he obtained a degree in economics at the Ludwig-Maximilians-Universität München.

In November 1912, Maisky moved to London and shared a house in Golders Green with Maxim Litvinov and Georgy Chicherin. As his English improved his circle of friends expanded to include George Bernard Shaw, H. G. Wells and Beatrice Webb. Beatrice Webb wrote that he was "one of the most open minded of Marxists, and is fully aware of the misfits in Marxian terminology—scholastic and dogmatic. But then he has lived abroad among infidels and philistines and his mind has been perhaps slightly contaminated by the foreign sophistical agnostic outlook on the closed universe of the Moscow Marxians". After the outbreak of war in 1914, he supported the Menshevik Internationalists, who were opposed to the war in a passive manner, acting as their main representative at a socialist conference in London in February 1915. This caused friction in his relationship with Litvinov, a Bolshevik, who supported Lenin's policy line of 'revolutionary defeatism', namely that the Bolsheviks should work actively for Russia's defeat as the best way of bringing about a revolution.

Maisky returned to Russia after the February Revolution, and served as deputy minister for labour in the provisional government of Alexander Kerensky. He opposed the Bolshevik Revolution, and as the Russian Civil War began, he moved to Samara. In July 1918, became minister for labor in the provisional government, known as the Komuch, who backed armed resistance to the Bolsheviks, for which he was expelled from the Menshevik party. He had to flee to Mongolia when Admiral Kolchak imposed a military dictatorship in Siberia in 1919. In Mongolia, he wrote a letter to Anatoly Lunacharsky praising the "boldness and originality" of the Bolsheviks, as compared with the "virtuous but talentless" Mensheviks, and on Lunacharsky's recommendation was allowed to join the Bolshevik party, and posted to Omsk as head of the Siberian section of Gosplan.

In January 1922, Maisky moved to Moscow as head of the press department of the People's Commissariat for Foreign Affairs (Narkomindel), now headed by Chicherin and Litvinov, where he met Agnia Skripina, his third wife, but was later posted to Leningrad, where, in January 1924, he was appointed chief editor of the literary journal Zvezda. Under his editorship, the magazine was the only major publication in the Soviet Union not controlled by the Russian Association of Proletarian Writers (RAPP) to encourage 'proletarian' literature, and have a representative of their movement on its board, while tolerating a range of critical opinion. Maisky personally tried to adopt a middle position between RAPP and their main opponent, Aleksandr Voronsky.

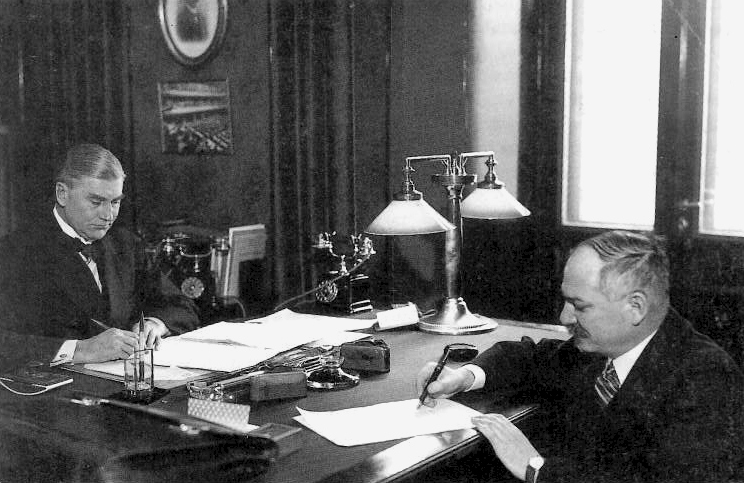
The signing of the Soviet–Finnish Non-Aggression Pact in Helsinki on 21 January 1932. On the left the Finnish foreign minister Aarno Yrjö-Koskinen; on the right the Envoy of the Soviet Union in Helsinki Ivan Maisky.

== Diplomatic career ==
In 1925, Maisky was appointed counselor at the Soviet embassy in London, where he served during the turbulence of the Zinoviev letter, and the General Strike, acting up as de facto ambassador with the sudden death of the ambassador, Leonid Krasin, until he was forced to leave when Britain severed diplomatic relations with the USSR in May 1927. He was counsellor at the Soviet embassy in Tokyo in 1927–29. In April 1929, he became the Soviet Envoy to Finland.

== Arrival in London ==
In October 1932 he returned to London as the official Soviet ambassador to the Court of St James's, as the post was titled. He held it until 1943. The First Five Year Plan had been launched in 1928 intended to make the Soviet Union industrially and hence militarily self-sufficient, and as such Maisky's duties in London were at first primarily economic. The British cabinet minister whom Maisky negotiated the most was the Chancellor of the Exchequer, Neville Chamberlain, who told Maisky that his nation was the "most unfriendly country in the world" from the British viewpoint and he was not inclined to grant British trade credits to permit the exports of British machinery to assist with the First Five Year Plan. Chamberlain came to detest Maisky, whom he saw as sly trickster who never said what he meant and never meant what he said. In a letter to his sister Ida on 19 November 1932, Chamberlain condemned Maisky as difficult and dishonest, feelings that he was to retain when became prime minister in 1937.

Maisky cultivated a close relationship with the left-wing British intelligentsia. Some of Maisky's close friends in London included the economist John Maynard Keynes, the writer H.G. Wells and the playwright George Bernard Shaw. Maisky always saw his mission in London as a way to win over British public opinion to favoring closer ties with the Soviet Union.

The Australian historian Sheila Fitzpatrick wrote: "Ivan Maisky was the epitome of the cosmopolitan intellectual whom Stalin and his team both despised and envied, and on top of that, a former Menshevik. A gregarious man, once in London he quickly grasped the mores of the English upper classes and established an extraordinary network of contacts." Maisky's circle of friends included a collection of politicians, businessmen, and intellectuals such as Anthony Eden, David Lloyd George, Winston Churchill, Ramsay MacDonald, Lord Beaverbrook, Sidney Webb, Beatrice Webb and Lady Astor.

Shortly after arriving in London, Maisky wrote: "An ambassador without excellent personal contacts is not worthy of the name". Maisky reported to Litvinov that his aim in London was "extending as widely as possible the series of visits which diplomatic etiquette imposes on a newly appointed ambassador, and in doing so to include not only the narrow circle of persons connected with the Foreign Office but also a number of members of the government, prominent politicians, people of the City and representatives of the cultural world". Beatrice Webb described Maisky as "not a fanatical Marxist" but as a man who takes "a broad view' and sees "the fanatical metaphysics and repression of today" as "temporary, brought about by past horrors and the low level of culture out of which the revolution started".

== Advocate of collective security ==
Starting in 1934 when the Soviet Union joined the League of Nations, the proclaimed policy of the Soviet government was support for collective security under the banner of the League of Nations against aggression. The major foreign policy-related fear of Moscow was of facing a two-front war with Germany attacking in Europe and Japan attacking in Asia. Maxim Litvinov, the Foreign Commissar from 1930 to 1939 favored a policy of creating a bloc of states meant to deter aggression in both Europe and Asia, and felt the League's policy of collective security was the ideal means for forming such a bloc. The policy of supporting collective security under the League was in effect was a roundabout way of supporting the international system established after World War in Europe and Asia (which the Soviets had opposed until then) without actually saying so.

Maisky's task in London was to enlist British support for this policy. Maisky argued to the Foreign Office that both Japan and Germany were aggressive powers out to challenge the international order in Asia and Europe respectively, and that Britain should co-operate with the Soviet Union in upholding the international order against the "revisionist" powers. The same policy of resistance to fascist aggression under the League's collective security principles tended to be embraced by British anti-appeasers such as Winston Churchill as a way of defending the international order created by the Treaty of Versailles. That treaty was widely viewed by British public opinion in the interwar period as too harsh towards Germany, and insofar as Nazi foreign policy was aimed at revising its terms, British public opinion was broadly supportive of such efforts until March 1939.

While ambassador, Maisky addressed as many British audiences as possible in order to break through the air of hostility towards the Soviet Union at the beginning of the 1930s, a task which Litvinov "encouraged Maisky to undertake in every way possible". Maisky was such an Anglophile that he wept at the funeral of King George V in 1936, which astonished many.

Robert Vansittart, a senior civil servant in the Foreign Office, arranged a dinner at his home at which Maisky first met Winston Churchill. Later, after a state banquet in honour of King Leopold of Belgium, in the presence of King George VI and of Joachim von Ribbentrop, Churchill made a point of being seen to have a long conversation with Maisky. Maisky took to cultivating the Canadian-born Media mogul Lord Beaverbrook. Lord Beaverbrook was the owner of a chain of newspapers that took a populist right-wing line, the most successful of which was the Daily Express.

Reflecting his Canadian origins, Beaverbrook believed in strengthening Britain's ties with the Commonwealth. He favored an isolationist line with regard to Europe, and therefore tended to support appeasement. However, Beaverbrook stated in a letter to Maisky in 1936 that he had a "friendly attitude" towards Stalin, and promised Maisky that "nothing shall be done or said by any newspaper controlled by me which is likely to disturb your tenure of office". Despite his support for "empire isolationism" and appeasement, Beaverbrook tended to take a fawning tone in his letters to Maisky and often called Stalin "your Great Leader". By contrast, the appeasers tended to dislike Maisky. Chamberlain called him a "revolting but clever little Jew."

A close collaborator of Maxim Litvinov, Maisky was an active member and the Soviet envoy to the Committee of Non-Intervention during the Spanish Civil War. The Non-Intervention Committee, which met in London, was mostly made up of the various ambassadors in London. Both Joachim von Ribbentrop, the German ambassador in London, and Dino Grandi, the Italian ambassador in London, did their best to sabotage the Non-Intervention Committee as both Germany and Italy had intervened in the Spanish Civil War by sending forces to fight alongside the Spanish Nationalists against the Spanish Republic.

At the first meeting of the Non-Intervention Committee on 9 September 1936, Maisky justified the Soviet intervention in the Spanish Civil War under the grounds that Germany and Italy had intervened in the war first. Maisky in his speech before the Committee stated that the Soviet Union would only observe the principles of the Non-Intervention Committee as much as the other powers represented in the Non-Intervention Committee did. Ribbentrop often visited Germany and during his absence from London, the chief German delegate on the committee was Prince Otto Christian Archibald von Bismarck. The Non-Intervention Committee became a farce and a political theater as Maisky traded insults with Grandi, Ribbentrop and Bismarck for the benefit of the journalists present over which power was intervening the most in Spain.

Maisky's position became increasingly difficult as the British government committed itself to a policy of appeasement, and he was unable to get clear instructions about Soviet policy. Maisky was close to a number of anti-appeasement MPs such as Churchill and the National Labour MP Harold Nicolson. Maisky was a leading figure in a loose collection of public figures who opposed appeasement, which included not only Churchill, Nicolson and his wife Lady Vita Sackville-West, but also Robert Boothby; Brendan Bracken and the Czechoslovak minister-plenipotentiary Jan Masaryk. A favourite meeting place for them was the Soviet embassy, which Churchill's son Randolph Churchill called "a grim Victorian mansion in Kensington Palace Gardens", but Maisky was a popular host who was generous in filling the glasses of his guests with white wine, red wine, sherry, vodka, and Curaçao. Despite the nature of the parties hosted by Maisky, he himself would only drink water.

The friendship between Maisky and Churchill surprised many. During the Russian Civil War, Churchill as the War Secretary in Lloyd George's government had been the leading supporter of the Whites, and consistently pressed for Britain to intervene more on the White side, much to the dismay of Lloyd George who privately favored a Red victory under the cynical grounds that Russia would be a weaker power under Red rule than under White rule. During the Russian Civil War, the British were by far the largest supporters of the White movement as the British contributed more arms to the Whites than all other nations combined, which was mostly due to Churchill. Given this background, many were surprised to see Churchill working with Maisky for a de facto Anglo-Soviet alliance.

Churchill justified his support for a League-based collective security foreign policy, which meant a de facto Anglo-Soviet alliance, on the grounds of realpolitik. As he told Maisky: "Today, the greatest menace to the British empire is German Nazism, with its ideal of Berlin's global hegemony. That is why at the present time, I spare no effort in the struggle against Hitler." However, he went on to say if the "fascist menace" ended to be replaced once more with the "communist menace", then "I would raise the banner of struggle against you once more". In April 1936, Maisky wrote in his diary that Churchill had told him "We would be complete idiots were we to deny help to the Soviet Union at present out of a hypothetical danger of socialism which might threaten our children and grandchildren."

He was well informed about the state of British politics, reporting that Chamberlain via his close friend, the government's Chief Industrial Adviser, Sir Horace Wilson, had constructed an alternative Foreign Office to by-pass the Foreign Office as he noted that there were differences of opinion between the prime minister and the Foreign Secretary Anthony Eden. Maisky wrote that Chamberlain had found Eden "to be a much tougher nut than the PM had expected." In February 1938, Eden resigned in protest following serious differences of opinion with Chamberlain about the policy to be pursued towards Italy. Eden was replaced as Foreign Secretary by Lord Halifax.

On 6 August 1938, Maisky reported to Moscow that he had met Masaryk, who lashed out at the Foreign Secretary, Lord Halifax, charging that the British were applying strong pressure on Czechoslovakia "to make the maximum number of concessions to the Sudeten Germans". Masaryk complained to Maisky that Halifax was not being "even-handed" as he constantly pressured the Czechoslovak government to make more and more concessions to Konrad Henlein while not applying pressure to Henlein to make any concessions.

On 8 August 1938, Maisky met with Lancelot Oliphant, the assistant permanent undersecretary for foreign affairs, where the Soviet ambassador stated that "all the actions of British diplomacy in Czechoslovakia were directed not at bridling aggression, but rather bridling the victims of aggression". Oliphant responded by stating that his government was committed to being "even-handed" in finding a solution that would be equally acceptable to both sides, through he admitted that many people shared Maisky's views of his government's policy. A week later, Maisky met with Lord Halifax, when he attacked Halifax for his government's "weak and shortsighted" policy as he accused the British on putting all the pressure for concessions on President Edvard Beneš of Czechoslovakia and none on Adolf Hitler. Much to Maisky's surprise, Halifax did not seek to defend his government's policy, instead falling silent.

After meeting Maisky earlier that day, Nicolson wrote in his diary on 26 August 1938: "if Maisky can be induced to promise Russian support if we take a strong line on Czechoslovakia, the weak will of the Prime Minister may be strengthened". During the Sudetenland crisis, Maisky together with Masaryk were in close contact with Clement Attlee, the leader of the Labour Party, which was the Official Opposition to the Conservative-dominated National Government. Much of the information which Attlee used in his speeches in the House of Commons during the crisis was supplied by Maisky and Masaryk.

On 3 September 1938, Maisky met with Charles Corbin, the French ambassador in London. Corbin complained at length to Maisky about the attitude of the Chamberlain government to the Sudetenland crisis, charging that the vague and evasive statements about what Britain might do if Germany invaded Czechoslovakia were making war more likely. Corbin informed Maisky that the Deuxième Bureau had intelligence to the effect that Hitler was convinced that Britain would not intervene if the crisis should lead to war. Corbin concluded by telling Maisky that France would declare war if Germany invaded Czechoslovakia. The next day, Maisky leaked to Churchill a private statement from Litvinov that the Soviet Union would honor its alliance with Czechoslovakia if France declared war.

After learning of the Berchtesgaden summit between Chamberlain and Hitler that ended with the agreement that the Sudetenland would "go home to the Reich", Maisky expressed much anger at the French Premier Édouard Daladier and Foreign Minister Georges Bonnet for not opposing the results of the Berchtesgaden summit more. Maisky believed the Franco-Soviet alliance of 1935 was effectively null and void as he privately declared that the alliance with France "is not worth a twopence". On 22 September 1938, another Anglo-German summit took place in Bad Godesberg, where Hitler rejected the Anglo-French plan to cede the Sudetenland after 1 October 1938 and demanded that Germany take possession of the Sudetenland before 1 October 1938, a demand that Chamberlain rejected.

In the last days of September 1938, Europe was on the brink of war. On 26 September 1938, the Foreign Office issued a statement warning that if Germany invaded Czechoslovakia, then both Britain and the Soviet Union would intervene. To resolve the crisis, it was announced on 28 September that an emergency summit would be held in Munich on 30 to be attended by Hitler, Chamberlain, Mussolini and Daladier. Maisky reported to Moscow: "In the air, it feels like Chamberlain is preparing for a new capitulation". On 29 September, Halifax told Maisky that Chamberlain had agreed to go to the Munich summit without consulting Daladier and did not want the Soviet government to be represented at the Munich conference. The Munich conference ended the crisis in a compromise with the Sudetenland to go to Germany, but 1 October. After the Munich agreement, Maisky reported to Moscow: "The League of Nations and collective security are dead".

In November 1938, Maisky told Charles Theodore Te Water, the South African high commissioner in London, about his "unutterable disgust with the Chamberlain policy" and stated his fears that the Munich Agreement of 30 September 1938 was a start of a four-power alliance of Britain, Italy, France and Germany meant to isolate the Soviet Union.

== The Danzig crisis ==
In early March 1939, Maisky reported with surprise to Moscow that Chamberlain had unexpectedly attended a reception at the Soviet embassy and had spoken to him in a civil tone, which he took as a sign that Britain was suddenly interested in better Anglo-Soviet relations. Maisky attributed the new interest in improving Anglo-Soviet relations to the Sino-Japanese war as he noted that both the Soviet Union and Britain had a vested interest in ensuring that Japan did not conquer China, which would elevate Japan to the status of an Asian superpower that would inevitably attack both their respective nations. Both the USSR and the United Kingdom had supported the Kuomintang regime with military and economic aid, which caused tensions with Japan.

In the summer of 1938, a border war had broken out along the border of the Soviet Union with the Japanese sham state of Manchukuo, and Maisky attached much importance towards having Britain as a counterweight to Japan. A further factor was the violently anti-British campaign launched by the German media in October 1938, which did not augur well for better Anglo-German relations. However, Maisky tended to put the worse possible gloss on Chamberlain's foreign policy in his reports to Litvinov and he argued that Chamberlain was still ultimately committed to an Anglo-German entente. He argued that Chamberlain wanted better Anglo-Soviet relations at least in part as a bargaining ploy with the Germans.

On 8 March 1939, Maisky had lunch with Rab Butler and Robert Hudson, which ended with him telling them as Hudson reported that "he was quite convinced that we, the British empire, were unable to stand up against German aggression, even with the assistance of France, unless we had the collaboration and help of Russia". Hudson reported that he had told Maisky that he believed that if matters came to war Britain would prevail against Germany with or without Soviet assistance.

Maisky gave a very different account of the same meeting in his report to Litvinov with his account stressing that Hudson had told him that he wanted the British empire to continue and was open to co-operation with the Soviet Union in both Europe and Asia as a way to deter the Axis states from further aggression. Maisky in his report to Litvinov wrote: "Personally Hudson would desire very that this orientation moved on the line London-Paris-Moscow. He is an ambitious politician, but I do not think Hudson could take the general line which he developed in today's discussion without the sanction of Chamberlain". Butler recorded Maisky as saying that what Hudson had just said was "too good to be true", a remark that he excluded from his report to Litvinov.

On 9 March 1939, Maisky reported that he had lunch with Lord Beaverbrook who told him in an "off-the-record" conversation that Chamberlain was disillusioned with Hitler, who had displayed flagrant bad faith ever since the Munich Agreement. The virulent British-bashing campaign in the German media was a further sign that the Reich was not interested in better Anglo-German relations. Maisky stated that Beaverbrook had told him that Chamberlain did not want a war with Germany, but saw no hope of a "solid friendship with Germany", making him interested in having the Soviet Union as a counterbalance to the Reich. Maisky quoted Butler and Captain Basil Liddel Hart, the defense correspondent of The Times, as making similar remarks. Just when Maisky saw some hope of better Anglo-Soviet relations, on 10 March 1939, Stalin-who rarely spoke in public-gave a speech in Moscow in which he warned ominously that the Soviet Union "would not pull chestnuts out of the fire" for others, which was the first indication that he was moving away from the League-based collective security foreign policy that he advocated ever since 1934.

On 29 March 1939, Sir Alexander Cadogan, the Permanent Undersecretary at the Foreign Office, told Maisky that Britain was going to issue a "guarantee" of Poland. Cadogan further told Maisky that the Poles did not want any help from the Soviet Union, and Chamberlain was aiming at a "peace front" to consist of Britain, France, Poland and Romania to counter German expansionism in Eastern Europe. Maisky reported: "I listened with great astonishment to Cadogan, knowing of the English secular dislike of firm commitments and on the European continent in particular". When Maisky asked Cadogan point-blank "Let's say that tomorrow Germany attacks Poland, will England in this case declare war on Germany?", Cadogan answered in the affirmative. Maisky broke out laughing and told Cadogan: "Because your new plan, if it is generally realized, which I am far from believing, would represent something like a revolution in the traditional foreign policy of Great Britain, and here, as it is well known, they do not like revolutions".

On 31 March 1939, Chamberlain announced the famous "guarantee" of Poland, stating Britain would go to war if the independence of Poland was threatened. Maisky was not impressed with the "guarantee", noting that it only applied to the independence of Poland, which left open the possibility of the Free City of Danzig or even the Polish corridor and Upper Silesia being returned to Germany. On 11 April 1939, Halifax told Maisky that Britain was also going to issue "guarantees" of Romania and Greece as well. Maisky objected to the British approach of bilateral "guarantees" and told him that his government preferred a multilateral agreement amongst the nations that were members of the League of Nations to protect the peace. On 13 April 1939, Maisky was informed that Stalin himself wanted him to take "a more reserved position" in his talks with the Foreign Office as he felt that Maisky came across as too eager for an agreement. The same cable stated: "We also consider inappropriate your critique of English policy. You should be guided by our direct instructions and not by articles from our press, which may permit to itself greater liberties than an official Soviet representative". On 13 April 1939, Britain issued the "guarantees" of Romania and Greece.

The British historian D.C. Watt wrote that Maisky was an ineffective ambassador in the sense that he preferred to ally himself with opponents of the Chamberlain government rather than with Chamberlain, a man whom he detested. Watt wrote that what Maisky should have done as ambassador was:

"...have been to do his utmost to convince the Conservative cabinet of Soviet military strength and determination, of what the Soviets could and would do to oppose Hitler. But this would have meant befriending and cultivating men whom he, the eternal café-revolutionary regarded as beyond cultivation. He preferred to intrigue, to "leak" to sympathetic journalists, to agitate and organise political pressure against them. And then he complained of the lack of confidence obtaining in Anglo-Soviet relations. Lost in admiration at his own skill in agitation, snobbishly proud of the half-great-was-men he had been able to organise into his schemes, delighted with his powers in penetrating the anti-establishment (which is in Britain so much a part of the establishment as to cause real radicals to talk of a mutual conspiracy), he failed to see that he was juggling with a collection of political nulls and minuses and that his own folly was working on and multiplying that of the British authorities with whom he had to deal".

Watt wrote that some of Maisky's friends such as Lloyd George had long ceased to be politically relevant in the manner that Maisky felt that he was. Lloyd George was a disgraced former prime minister with a reputation for deviousness who continued to sit as a Liberal MP almost up to his death in 1945 with delusions of one day becoming prime minister again. Watt argued that much of Chamberlain's dislike and distrust of Maisky was well warranted as the Soviet ambassador was all too willing to intrigue with Chamberlain's domestic enemies against him. However, Watt concluded that Maisky was a "sad, even a tragic figure still, this epitome of the British image of a Soviet diplomatist, with his 'sad Tatar eyes', longing always for an Anglo-Soviet rapprochement".

After Litvinov was dismissed in May 1939, Maisky was almost the last exponent of a pact with Britain and France against Germany still in post, and was effectively prevented from speaking in public. Maisky stated: "Far from all the leading comrades' (including presumably Molotov) "realised the value of such speeches". Maisky was deeply involved in the talks for the proposed "peace front" of 1939 that was intended to deter Germany from invading Poland. The slowness of the Chamberlain government in responding to the Soviet offers to have the Soviet Union take part in the "peace front" did much to undermine Maisky's standing in Moscow and gave the impression that Chamberlain was not serious about including the Soviet Union in the "peace front".

The Soviet offer of 18 April 1939 to have the Soviet Union join the "peace front" only received a British reply on 6 May 1939. Despite his concerns about Chamberlain, Maisky believed that British public opinion would ultimately force Chamberlain to make an alliance with the Soviet Union as he noted in a dispatch on 10 May 1939 that a recent public poll showed that 87% of the British people wanted an alliance with Moscow. On 17 May 1939, Vansittart met with Maisky to offer Anglo-Soviet staff talks. On 19 May 1939, Maisky met again with Vansittart to tell him that he received word from Molotov that Moscow would only accept a full military alliance with Britain and France, and the offer of staff talks was insufficient. Maisky had drawn Chamberlain's ire at this time due to a report from MI5 that Maisky was in contact with anti-appeasement British journalists and leaking to them information that it was the British government which was stalling about forming an Anglo-French-Soviet alliance intended to deter Germany from invading Poland.

During the debates in the House of Commons in May 1939, Chamberlain continued to insist upon his opposition to an alliance with the Soviet Union as he maintained that the most Britain would do was to open staff talks with the Soviets and would only sign an alliance if Germany invaded Poland. Maisky had intensely briefed Churchill on the geopolitics of Eastern Europe and during the debates in the House of Commons on 20 May 1939 and again on 21 May, Churchill was described as inflicting a series of savage verbal blows on Chamberlain and his ministers over the issue. Churchill argued that Chamberlain's approach was completely backward as signing an alliance only after Germany invaded Poland was defeating the entire purpose of deterrence diplomacy, which was to prevent Germany from invading Poland at all. Churchill argued that the better eastern alliance partner for Britain was the Soviet Union, which had a larger military, a larger industrial base and a greater population than Poland.

The debates in the House of Commons influenced British public opinion and Chamberlain was increasingly forced to accept that Britain would have to open talks with the Soviet Union for an alliance. On 21 May 1939, Maisky told Halifax that the aim of the peace front was to prevent the Danzig crisis from ending in war. Maisky stated that best way of achieving that aim was "by organising such a combination of forces that Germany would not dare to attack". Maisky maintained: "Herr Hitler is not a fool and would never enter upon a war which he was bound to lose...The only thing he understands is force". Maisky believed that the stalling over the "peace front" was because the British government did want "to burn its bridges to Hitler and Mussolini".

The talks for an Anglo-French-Soviet "peace front" to deter Germany from invading Poland as the Danzig crisis continued to heat up proved to very difficult . A major problem turned out to the issue of the Baltic states and the Soviet definition of "indirect aggression", which to British ears sounded very much like a proposal for Soviet interference in the internal affairs of the Baltic states. On 12 June 1939, Maisky met with Halifax where the two clashed over the definition of "indirect aggression", though Maisky's account of the meeting was far more positive than Halifax's. On 23 June 1939, Maisky had a difficult meeting with Halifax who accused Molotov of "absolute inflexibility". Maisky in turn stated the Soviet government should not have stated its "irreducible minimum" before opening the talks as he accused the British of demanding too many concessions.

Maisky also wanted the proposed "peace front" to protect the three Baltic states of Estonia, Latvia, and Lithuania regardless of whether those states wanted it or not. Maisky used as a parallel the Monroe declaration that the United States would not permit European states to conquer Latin America, saying that just as the United States did not consult the Latin American states, that the same principle should apply to the states of Eastern Europe Maisky ended by saying that protecting Poland was not enough for his government. Maisky advised that Halifax should fly to Moscow to personally see Molotov, a suggestion that Halifax rejected.

On 10 July 1939, Maisky reported to Moscow that he did not feel that Chamberlain was serious about including the Soviet Union in the "peace front" and still had hopes of resolving the Danzig crisis by working out a Munich-type deal under which the Free City of Danzig would "go home to the Reich". In support of this thesis, Maisky noted that Chamberlain had refused to include anti-appeasement Conservative MPs like Churchill and Eden in the cabinet. Maisky reported that Chamberlain "intensely dislikes and fears Churchill", the British politician most open to including the Soviet Union in the projected "peace front".

Another issue in the "peace front" talks was the Soviet demand that France and Britain sign a military convention first, to be followed by an alliance. In July 1939, it was announced that an Anglo-French military mission under Admiral Sir Reginald Plunket-Drax-Ernle-Erle and General Joseph Doumenc would go to Moscow to negotiate the military convention. The military mission was to travel to Leningrad on a slow merchant ship which moved at only 13 knots per hour, the SS City of Exeter, after Lord Halifax vetoed sending the military mission on a Royal Navy cruiser or a destroyer as he felt it would be too much of a provocation to Germany to send a British warship into the Baltic Sea. When Maisky asked to meet Admiral Drax, Halifax told Drax that he should only meet Maisky "if you can bear it". When Maisky asked Drax why he was taking a slow-moving ship instead of an airplane to Moscow, Drax claimed that a ship was needed because of all the excess baggage he was taking with him to Moscow, a claim that Maisky did not believe.

Maisky wrote in a report to Moscow: "I could not believe my ears. Europe is beginning to burn under our feet, and the Anglo-French military mission are going to Moscow on a slow freighter. Staggering. Chamberlain is still up to his tricks. He does not need a tripartite pact, he needs negotiations on a pact, in order to sell more dearly this card to Hitler". Despite his concerns about the "slow boat to Russia" as the City of Exeter came to be known, Maisky still felt confident as he wrote: "Slowly, but irrepressibly, with zigzags, setbacks, failures, Anglo-Soviet relations are improving. From the Metro-Vickers affair, we have come to the journey of the military mission to Moscow!"

Maisky believed that the anti-appeasement politicians such as Churchill would eventually rally public opinion and force Chamberlain to forge a "peace front" with the Soviet Union. He was privately critical of the decision of his government to sign the non-aggression pact with Germany on 23 August 1939. Maisky believed that both Stalin and Molotov were too impatient for an agreement to keep the Soviet Union out of another world war, and should have given Churchill more time. Maisky was privately confused by the volte-face represented by the non-aggression pact with Germany as he wrote in his diary: "Our policy obviously represents a kind of sudden reversal, the reasoning behind which is for the present still not entirely clear to me".

== World War Two ==
After the outbreak of World War II, Maisky dealt with a number of crises including intense British hostility towards the Soviets as a result of the Winter War with Finland. During the Winter War, Maisky worked to prevent Anglo-Soviet relations from being stressed too much. Maisky was taken greatly by surprise by the swift German conquest of Poland as he expected the Poles to last much longer. In a dispatch to Moscow, Maisky wrote in French "La Pologne est foutue!" ("Poland is fucked!"). Maisky compared Anglo-Soviet relations to a "taut string", saying the more tensions placed on the string, the more likely it will break.

Maisky reported the Winter War was the most serious source of stress and "the sooner this situation is brought to a satisfactory conclusion, the better the chances Anglo-Soviet relations can survive the present crisis". Maisky met with Butler to tell him: "It's essential that those who are responsible for the big decisions keep cool heads". In February 1940, Butler told Maisky that his government wanted to "save Finland", but not to the extent of going to war with the Soviet Union. Maisky wanted to "localise" the Winter War, and objected to Butler's plans for British military aid to Finland, which he felt would achieve the precise opposite. In response, Molotov ordered Maisky to inform Butler that the Soviet Union was open to talks with Finland and would not invade either Sweden or Norway provided that those states remained neutral.

A passionate Anglophile who enjoyed his posting in London, Maisky was reprimanded by Molotov in April 1940 for having "gone too native" with the complaint being made that he liked the British too much. Maisky must have been heartened when he visited one of his favorite restaurants in London at the time of the British withdrawal from Dunkirk. The proprietor's wife was in charge of the restaurant. When Maisky enquired about the whereabouts of the proprietor, she replied he was at Dunkirk, having gone in one of the small private boats which had sailed there in extremely dangerous conditions to assist the evacuation of troops, in response to a UK government appeal. Maisky was amazed when the proprietor's wife said that he had 'gone to save the boys from the Germans'. Maisky's reaction was 'It would not be easy to conquer such a people'.

Maisky reported to Moscow in the summer of 1940 that British morale was holding well and that: "There growing [here] a stubborn will, a cold British hatred and determination to fight to the end". In July 1940, Churchill told Maisky at a meeting at 10 Downing Street: "The fate of Paris does not await London". However, Maisky reported "the danger is very great" that Germany might still win the war. In private, Maisky shared Churchill's belief that if the Reich defeated Britain, then Germany would turn east and invade the Soviet Union, which led to hope that Britain would still somehow win the war.

In 1941, after the German invasion of the Soviet Union, Maisky was responsible for the normalisation of relations with the Western Allies. Maisky wrote in his diary that in the immediate aftermath of Operation Barbarossa that Stalin expected Britain to ally with Germany, writing that the Kremlin "believed that the British fleet was steaming up the North Sea for joint attack with Hitler on Leningrad and Kronstadt." Maisky reported correctly to Moscow that Churchill was not interested in peace with Germany. However, Maisky was frustrated by Churchill's unlimited faith in the power of strategic bombing to win the war; he wrote in his diary that Churchill had promised him that the Royal Air Force would "bomb Germany mercilessly...In the end we will overwhelm Germany with bombs. We will break the morale of the population." Most notably, Churchill was unwilling to have the British Army land in France to open up a second front, as he contended that Bomber Command was capable of winning the war alone, an assessment of airpower that Maisky did not share.

On 5 July 1941, Maisky met with General Władysław Sikorski, the premier of the Polish government-in-exile based in London, to discuss resuming Polish-Soviet diplomatic relations. At the time of the meeting, Operation Barbarossa was going well for the Reich and the Wehrmacht had advanced deep into the Soviet Union. Sikorski believed that there was a strong possibility that the Soviet Union might be defeated in 1941, and paradoxically this gave Maisky the upper hand in his talks. Sikorski's main interest was in freeing the Poles imprisoned in the Soviet Union in order to raise an army and as such, he wanted to achieve this before the Soviet Union was possibly defeated. Sikorski invited Maisky to see him at the Rubens Hotel, where the Polish government-in-exile was based, a plan that the British vetoed. Instead, Maisky and Sikorski met on the "neutral ground" of Cadogan's office at the Foreign Office.

Sikorski wanted the Soviets to renounce the 1939 non-aggression pact; resume diplomatic relations and free all of the Polish Army POWs in Soviet captivity, demands which Maisky rejected. On 11 July 1941, Maisky met again with Sikorski in the office of the Foreign Secretary, Anthony Eden, where he argued fiercely about the precise number of Polish POWs in the Soviet Union. Sikorski claimed there were 10,000 Polish officers and 180,000 other ranks in Soviet camps while Maisky stated there were only 10,000 Polish POWs in total. Maisky also rejected Sikorski's demand for the 1921 frontier created by the Treaty of Riga to be the post-war Polish-Soviet frontier, saying that his government wanted the 1939 frontiers. The talks dragged out owing to the difficulties Maisky had with communicating to his superiors in the Narkomindel as it took days for messages to and from Moscow to arrive. The breakthrough in the talks was achieved by Sir Stafford Cripps, the British ambassador in Moscow and a Labour MP on the extreme left of his party, who on 27 July 1941 met with Stalin in the Kremlin who agreed that all of the Poles imprisoned in the Soviet Union would be freed. On 30 July 1941, Maisky and Sikorski signed an agreement at the Foreign Office with Eden watching in front of the British media.

Among other pacts, Maisky signed the Sikorski–Mayski agreement of 1941, which declared the Treaty of Non-Aggression Between Germany and the Union of Soviet Socialist Republics null and void. It also normalised relations between the Soviet Union and the Polish government-in-exile and allowed for hundreds of thousands of Poles to be released from Soviet prisoner of war camps.

In the summer of 1941, Maisky learned via a German Communist émigré living in London, Jürgen Kuczynski, that another German Communist émigré, Klaus Fuchs, was engaged in the British Tube Alloys atomic bomb project. Kuczynski told Maisky that Fuchs would almost certainly spy for the Soviet Union if he was asked to do so, which led Maisky to decide to recruit him as a spy. As Maisky greatly disliked the NKVD rezident at the London embassy, Ivan Chichayev, he decided to leave the recruitment to the GRU rezident Ivan Sklyarov, who in turn assigned the task to his secretary, Semyon Kremer.

In August 1941, when Kuczynski visited the embassy, he was met by Maisky who introduced him to Kremer and told him to ensure that Kremer met Fuchs in an inconspicuous place where neither the agents of MI5 nor the Special Branch of Scotland Yard would be likely to notice the meeting. Maisky later wrote: "I am quite clear that Fuchs never came to the embassy. We agreed via Dr. Kuczynski how and where to meet, and did so on a quiet street in west London at night. I took great care in preparing for the meeting and kept checking for surveillance on my way there". On 8 August 1941, Kremer met with Fuchs, who agreed immediately to share the secrets of the Tube Alloys project with the GRU, saying that he felt it was a moral necessity for the Soviet Union to have an atomic bomb.

On 16 October 1941, a new government was formed in Tokyo with the prime minister being General Hideki Tojo, a Japanese ultra-nationalist whose appointment as prime minister was taken at the time as presaging war, but against whom was an open question. There were two schools of thought in the Japanese government, the "strike north" school of thought which favored having Japan invade the Soviet Union, a prospect made enticing by the fact that the Soviets were fully engaged against the German invasion, and the "strike south" school of thought, which favored taking advantage of the fact that the British were engaged against Germany to seize the British colonies in Asia. Tojo had long served in the Kwantung Army which occupied Manchuria and was known to be a Russophobe. Maisky believed that Tojo belonged to the "strike north" school of thought. As such, Maisky met with the Foreign Secretary Anthony Eden on 17 October 1941, strongly urging the British government to issue a statement warning against a Japanese invasion of Siberia. Maisky also urged Eden to continue with their build-up of forces in Asia meant to deter the Japanese from "striking south", arguing that the build-up of forces in Malaya, Singapore and Hong Kong together with the dispatch of a Royal Navy battle-squadron to Singapore were helpful to the Soviet Union as a means of deterring Japan.

During these years in London, he reassured Joseph Stalin that Britain had no interest in signing a separate peace with Germany. Maisky was also pressuring Britain to open a second front against the Germans in Northern France. He maintained close contact with Winston Churchill and Anthony Eden and personally visited the Foreign Office every day to get the latest news.

In July 1943, Maisky was recalled to Moscow 'for consultations'. That was, in fact, the end of his career as a diplomat. Maxim Litvinov was recalled to Moscow at the same time. Both men were awarded the rank of Deputy Minister for Foreign Affairs, but in Maisky's case particularly the title meant almost nothing. It is unclear why Stalin recalled them. Various theories are set out in J Holroyd-Doveton's biography of Maxim Litvinov. The official reason, announced by Molotov, was that their recall was necessitated by the need for their advice in Moscow. There was a dearth in the Soviet government of men who would have the breadth of knowledge and experience which would qualify them to advise Stalin on his relations with the US and Britain. Maisky believed they were recalled because of Churchill's letter of 5 May 1943 informing Stalin of the postponement of the Second Front until the spring of 1944. Maisky's wife agreed, as she told Jock Balfour's wife that her husband was recalled because Maisky failed to obtain a Second Front.

Maisky led a number of commissions planning possible Soviet strategies for ending the war and for the immediate post-war world. Maisky's commission focused particularly on the dismemberment of Germany, heavy reparations (including forced labor), severe punishment of war criminals, and long-term Soviet occupation. He also recommended maintaining a "viable Poland," albeit with significantly modified borders. In terms of post-war planning, Maisky envisioned a Europe with "one strong land power, the USSR, and only one strong sea power, Britain." His concerns about what he perceived as American ideological hostility led him to see Britain as a more viable long-term partner because he believed they would be more conservative going into the post-war world. He anticipated a struggle between the two, which would push Britain closer to the Soviet Union.

Unlike Litvinov and Gromyko, who also participated in the commission, Maisky foresaw the greatest danger to the Soviet Union would be US technology plus Chinese human numbers spearheaded against the USSR. The possibility of a war between Communist China and the Soviet Union might have seemed an attractive proposition to the US and her allies.

Maisky joined Soviet delegations to the conferences in Yalta and Potsdam.

== Arrest and release ==
After the Potsdam conference, Maisky was relieved of responsibility for reparations, and not given another assignment until March 1946, when he was made part of a team drawing up a diplomatic dictionary. At his own request, he was admitted to the Soviet Academy of Sciences to concentrate on studying history. He was sacked from the foreign ministry in January 1947, and was arrested on 19 February 1953, during the anti-semitic purge that peaked with the announcement of the so-called Doctors' plot. In custody, fearing that he might be tortured, he 'confessed' to having been recruited as a spy while he was stationed in Tokyo, and had then been recruited by Winston Churchill to spy for the UK.

He was saved from the threat of execution by Stalin's death, in March, when Lavrentiy Beria seized back control of the Ministry of State Security (MGB) and renounced the Doctors' plot as a fabrication. But when Maisky was brought in front of MGB General Pytor Fedotov, who had been instructed to investigate Maisky's unlawful arrest, he feared a trap, refused to believe that Stalin was dead, and persisted with his story that he had been a spy. He did not back down until he had been put in a rest home, reunited with his wife, and shown film of Stalin's funeral.

After a face to face meeting with Beria, Maisky was appointed Chairman of the Society for Cultural Relations with Foreign Countries – seemingly as part of a manoeuvre by Beria to wrest control of foreign policy from Molotov, who had regained his former position as foreign minister, and whose antagonism to Maisky was well known. As a result, Maisky was rearrested after Beria's fall from office in June 1953. This time, he refused to confess, and at his trial, in June 1955, was sentenced to the comparatively light term of six years in exile. He was very soon granted clemency, and was released on 22 July 1955, when the new Soviet leader, Nikita Khrushchev, was due to meet Anthony Eden in Geneva.

== Later years ==
After his release, Maisky went back to work in the Academy of Sciences, and was allowed to publish four volumes of memoirs. In 1960 he was fully rehabilitated. In 1966 Maisky signed the so-called "Letter of 25" Soviet writers, scientists and cultural figures, addressed to Leonid Brezhnev and expressing opposition to a possible rehabilitation of Stalin.

However he remained loyal to Leonid Brezhnev and refused to have any sympathy with the dissidents of the late Soviet period. When, in 1968, Maxim Litvinov's grandson Pavel Litvinov with fellow students demonstrated against the Soviet invasion of Czechoslovakia, Maisky telephoned Maxim Litvinov's daughter Tanya who confirmed that it was true. Maisky was so shocked that he refused to have any further contact with the Litvinovs.

== Works ==
- Social and Economic Planning in the USSR. (Anglo-Russian Parliamentary Committee, 1935)
- Soviet Foreign Policy. (Anglo-Russian Parliamentary Committee, 1936)
- Economic Development of the USSR and Soviet Foreign Policy. (Anglo-Russian Parliamentary Committee, 1936)
- Progress within the USSR and the Present International Situation. (Anglo-Russian Parliamentary Committee, 1937)
- Soviet Youth: Its Training and Opportunities. (Anglo-Russian Parliamentary Committee, 1938)
- Soviet–Polish Relations. (Soviet War News, 1943)
- Before the Storm. (Hutchinson, 1944)
- Journey into the Past. (Hutchinson, 1962)
- Who Helped Hitler? (Hutchinson, 1964)
- Spanish Notebooks. (Hutchinson, 1966)
- Memoirs of A Soviet Ambassador: The War, 1939–1943. (Hutchinson, 1967)
- The Munich Drama. (Novosti, 1978)
- The Maisky Diaries: The Wartime Revelations of Stalin's Ambassador in London. (Yale University Press, 2016)
- The Complete Maisky Diaries. (in three volumes) (Yale University Press, 2017)
