= Theodolinda Hahnsson =

Finnish writer and translator

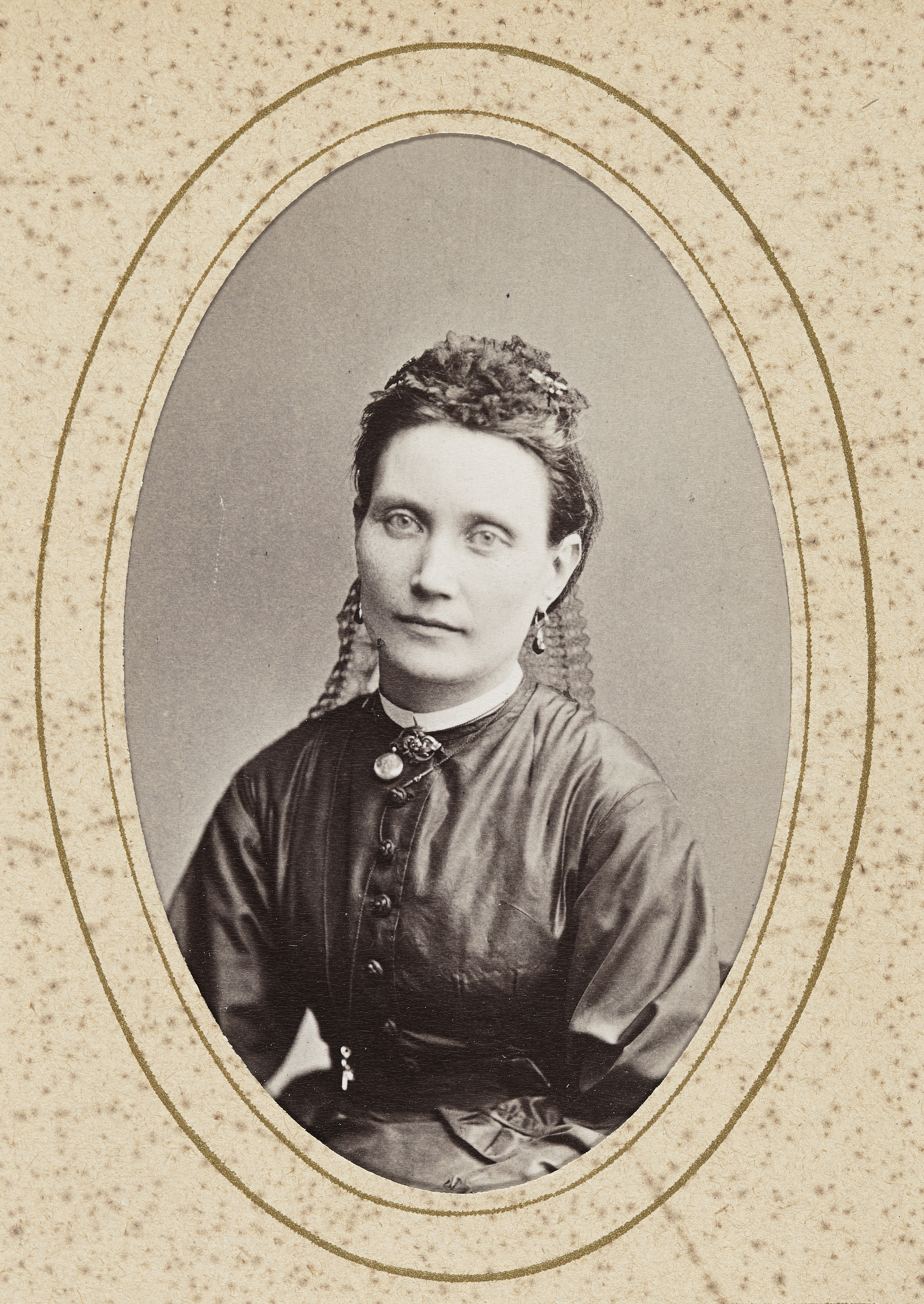
- Born: Sofia Theodolinda Limón; 1 February 1838; Tyrvää, Satakunta, Finland
- Died: 20 April 1919 (aged 81); Helsinki, Finland
- Other names: Theodolinda Yrjö-Koskinen
- Occupation(s): Author, translator
- Years active: 1869–1917
- Spouses: Johan Arvid Hahnsson, Yrjö Sakari Yrjö-Koskinen
- Children: Hannu Haahti, Hilja Maria Sofia, Hilja Haahti
- Parents: Karl Magnus Limón (father); Maria Kristina Mollin (mother)

Sofia Theodolinda Hahnsson (née Limón; 1 February 1838 – 20 April 1919) was a Finnish writer and translator. She is the first known female author to write in Finnish. She was a significant figure in the literary society of Hämeenlinna. She had published several popular short stories, novels, and social plays, some of which appeared in newspapers.

== Life ==
Theodolinda was born on 1 February 1838, in Tyrvää, Satakunta, Finland. She was the daughter of pastor Karl Magnus Limón, and his wife Maria Kristina Mollin. She did not attend academic schooling, but was homeschooled by her father. She was married to Johan Adrian Hahnsson in 1864, and moved with his family to Hämeenlinna in 1871 when he got a teaching post at a school in the city. She had a daughter, Hilja Haahti née Hahnsson, who would also become a writer. Upon the death of her husband in 1888, Theodolinda moved to Helsinki in 1892 and married Senator Yrjö Sakari Yrjö-Koskinen. She then published under her second married name of Theodolinda Yrjö-Koskinen. Theodolinda Hahnsson died on 20 April 1919, in Helsinki.

== Writing ==
Theodolinda's writing represented a romantic idealism tinted with Christianity and patriotism. Her writings also raised social issues such as poverty, and the power of the father in deciding the marriage of the daughter. She is best known for her 1887 novel Huutolaiset, where she describes the lives of two girls caught in the vendue Huutolaisuus system of auctioning the poor out to families. She was most active during the 1870s and 1880s with her writing. After her second marriage, she did translations.

== Selected works ==
- Ainoa hetki: Kolmi-näytöksinen näytelmä [The only moment: A three-act play] (in Finnish). 1873.
- Haapakallio: Idyllin-tapainen kuvaelma Hämeenlinnasta [Aspen Rock: An idyllic-like depiction of Hämeenlinna] (in Finnish). 1869.
- Huutolaiset [Shouters] (in Finnish). 1887.
- Kotikuusen kuiskehia [Wheat spruce frames] (in Finnish). 1884.
- Mäkelän Liisu (in Finnish). 1880.
- Kaksi [Two] (in Finnish). 1893.
- Joululahjat [Christmas presents] (in Finnish). 1891.

== Bibliography ==
- Forsman, Jaakko; Havu, I; Salovaara, Hannes; Setälä, Vilho; Wecksell, J. A (1927). Pieni tietosanakirja. 3 3 (in Finnish). Helsinki: Otava. p. 1439–1440. OCLC 247630283.
- Pynsent, Robert B.; Kanikova, Sonia I. (1993). Reader's Encyclopedia of Eastern European Literature. HarperCollins. ISBN 978-0-06-270007-0.
- Lappalainen, Päivi; Rojola, Lea (2007). Women's Voices: Female Authors and Feminist Criticism in the Finnish Literary Tradition. Finnish Literature Society. ISBN 978-951-746-760-5.
- Godenhjelm, Bernard Fredrik (1896). Handbook of the History of Finnish Literature. Butler.
