= Yrjö Sakari Yrjö-Koskinen =

Finland-Swedish politician and historian (1830–1903)

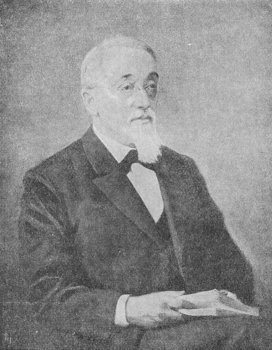
Yrjö Koskinen

Baron Yrjö Sakari Yrjö-Koskinen (born Georg Zacharias Forsman; author name Yrjö Koskinen; 10 December 1830 in Vaasa – 13 November 1903 in Helsinki) was a Finnish historian, politician, publicist and senator. He was professor of history at the University of Helsinki and a leading figure in the Fennoman movement, succeeding Johan Vilhelm Snellman as the foremost spokesman of Finnish-nationalist politics and serving as chairman of the Finnish Party. A Finland Swede by background, he belonged to the clerical Forsman family of Swedish origin, and he fennicized his name to Yrjö Sakari Yrjö-Koskinen upon his ennoblement in 1884. He was raised to baronial rank in 1897. His second wife was the Finnish author Theodolinda Hahnsson.

He is buried in the Hietaniemi Cemetery in Helsinki.

== Background and education ==
Yrjö-Koskinen was born in Vaasa into the Swedish-speaking Forsman family, a clerical family of Swedish origin. His father, Georg Jakob Forsman, was a teacher in Vaasa and later vicar in Hämeenkyrö (Tavastkyro). Although raised entirely in Swedish, he was inspired during his school years by Snellman's newspaper Saima and began to study Finnish on his own, continuing his studies in spoken Finnish in Hämeenkyrö under the guidance of a local woman known as "Pirtti-Anni". He later famously remarked that learning Finnish had felt "like a descent into hell", yet went on to demand the same effort of other educated Swedish-speakers.

He matriculated at the Imperial Alexander University in Helsinki in 1847 and earned his master's degree in 1853 with history as his main subject. His doctoral dissertation (1858) treated the outbreak of the Cudgel War in Ostrobothnia.

== Historian ==
Yrjö-Koskinen was appointed professor of general history at the University of Helsinki in 1863, and through an exchange of chairs moved in 1876 to the chair of Finnish, Russian and Nordic history. His research focused on the Cudgel War, the Greater Wrath, Göran Magnus Sprengtporten, and the prehistory and medieval period of Finland.

His main work, Oppikirja Suomen kansan historiassa ("Textbook in the History of the Finnish People", 1869–1873), applied a Finnish-nationalist perspective inspired by Snellman and Hegel to the history of Finland. In Yrjö-Koskinen's view, the centuries of Swedish rule had constituted a prolonged suppression and discrimination of the Finnish nation; in this spirit, Fennoman historians set out to rewrite the whole of Finnish history. His 1857 study of settlement in Ostrobothnia long remained influential, as did his thesis that the birkarls who taxed the Sámi were peasants from Tavastia. His contemporaries debated his hypotheses vigorously, and some historians considered them both tendentious and excessively shaped by his political commitments.

== Publicist and politician ==
Yrjö-Koskinen was active as a journalist and publicist for half a century, founding or editing several newspapers that became leading voices of the Finnish Party, including Helsingin Uutiset (1863), Kirjallinen kuukauslehti (which he edited for nearly half a century), Uusi Suometar (1869), and the Swedish-language Morgonbladet (1872) directed at Swedish-speaking supporters of the Fennoman cause. In the newspaper Suometar on 17 August 1864 he coined the term valtioyö ("state night") for the constitutional hiatus in Finnish history between 1809 and 1863, when the Diet of Finland did not convene.

He represented the clergy in the Diet of Finland in 1872, 1877–1878 and 1882, and from 1885 sat among the nobility. His intervention was decisive in securing a settlement favourable to Finland of the conscription law of 1877–1878.

Appointed to the Senate in 1882, Yrjö-Koskinen served from 1885 to 1899 as head of the Ecclesiastical Affairs Expedition, the senate department responsible for schools and culture. Under his fifteen-year tenure as effectively minister of education, the number of elementary schools rose from 667 to 1,650 and the number of pupils from about 40,000 to nearly 100,000; the number of Finnish-language secondary schools (lyceums) grew from three to fifteen, and Finnish-language girls' schools from none to seven. The school district decree of 1898 secured the long-term future of the elementary school system.

As leader of the Finnish Party, Yrjö-Koskinen was a conservative who advocated close cooperation with the Russian authorities in order to advance the Finnish-language cause. During the constitutional crises at the turn of the twentieth century, marked by the Russification of Finland, he sought to keep the administration in Finnish hands in order to safeguard the survival of the Finnish nation. This line, which also entailed a sharpening of the language conflict with the Swedish-speaking minority, was condemned by opponents as a policy of acquiescence and split the Finnish Party into the Old Finns and the Young Finns.

In February 1899 Yrjö-Koskinen voted in the Senate in favour of promulgating the February Manifesto, by which Tsar Nicholas II curtailed Finnish autonomy. He subsequently requested release from the Senate, and his public political career was effectively over.

== Personal life ==
Yrjö-Koskinen was the son of the Reverend Georg Jakob Forsman and Anna Lovisa Ebeling. In 1854 he married Sofia Fransiska Friberg, whom he had become engaged to while studying Finnish in Hämeenkyrö. After her death in 1895 he married, in 1896, the author Theodolinda Hahnsson (née Limón), the widow of a lector. He was the brother of Jakob Oskar Forsman.
