= Dilger =

Dilger is a surname. Notable people with the surname include:

- Anton Dilger (1884–1918), German-American physician
- Hubert Dilger (1836–1911), decorated German immigrant in the Union Army during the American Civil War
- Ken Dilger (born 1971), retired American football player
- Max Dilger (born 1989), German Speedway racer
- Mike Dilger (born 1966), British ecologist and natural history presenter
