= Germany–Soviet Union relations (1918–1941) =

Germany–Soviet Union (1918–1941) relations
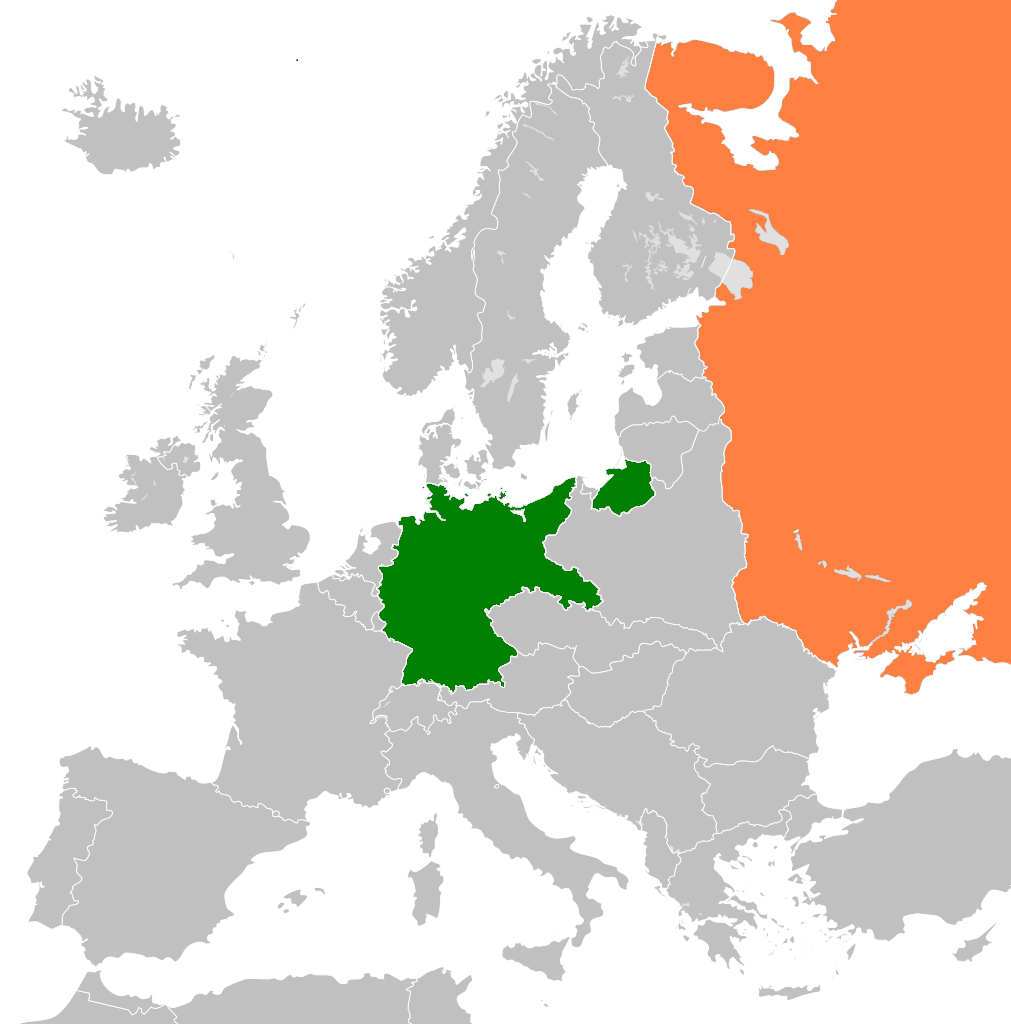

- Germany: Soviet Union

Nazi Germany–Soviet Union (1918–1941) relations
- Germany: Soviet Union

German–Soviet relations date to the aftermath of the First World War. The Treaty of Brest-Litovsk, dictated by Germany ended hostilities between Russia and Germany; it was signed on March 3, 1918. A few months later, the German ambassador to Moscow, Wilhelm von Mirbach, was shot dead by Russian Left Socialist-Revolutionaries in an attempt to incite a new war between Russia and Germany. The entire Soviet embassy under Adolph Joffe was deported from Germany on November 6, 1918, for their active support of the German Revolution. Karl Radek also illegally supported communist subversive activities in Weimar Germany in 1919.

From the outset, both states sought to overturn the new order that was established by the victors of World War I. Germany, laboring under onerous reparations and stung by the collective responsibility provisions of the Treaty of Versailles, was a defeated nation in constant turmoil. This and the Russian Civil War made both Germany and the Soviets into international outcasts, and their resulting rapprochement during the interbellum was a natural convergence. At the same time, the dynamics of their relationship was shaped by both a lack of trust and the respective governments' fears of its partner's breaking out of diplomatic isolation and turning towards the French Third Republic (which at the time was thought to possess the greatest military strength in Europe) and the Second Polish Republic, its ally. The countries' economic relationship dwindled in 1933, when Adolf Hitler came to power and created Nazi Germany; however, the relationships restarted in the end of 1930s, culminating with the Molotov–Ribbentrop Pact of 1939 and several trade agreements.

Few questions concerning the causes of World War II are more controversial and ideologically loaded than the issue of the policies of the Soviet Union under Joseph Stalin towards Nazi Germany between the Nazi seizure of power and the German invasion of the USSR on June 22, 1941. A variety of competing and contradictory theses exist, including: that the Soviet leadership actively sought another great war in Europe to further weaken the capitalist nations; that the USSR pursued a purely defensive policy; or that the USSR tried to avoid becoming entangled in a war, both because Soviet leaders did not feel that they had the military capabilities to conduct strategic operations at that time, and to avoid, in paraphrasing Stalin's words to the 18th Party Congress on March 10, 1939, "pulling other nations' (the UK and France's) chestnuts out of the fire."

== The Soviet Union and Weimar Germany ==
=== Revolution and end of World War I ===
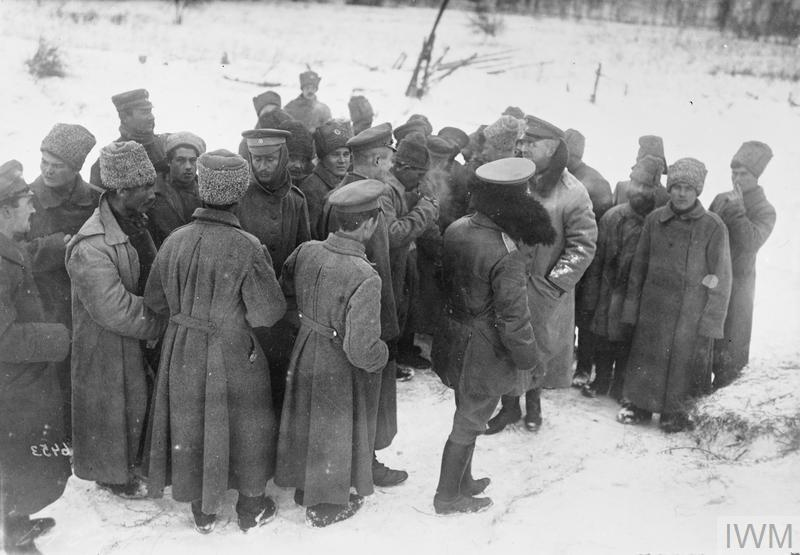
German and Bolshevik troops fraternizing in the area of the Yaselda River, February 1918

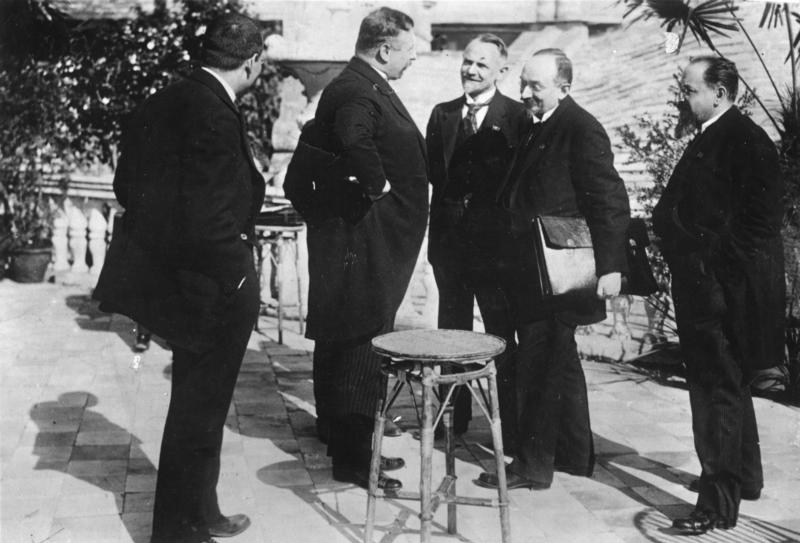
Treaty of Rapallo, Joseph Wirth with Leonid Krasin, Georgy Chicherin and Adolf Joffe, 1922

The outcome of the First World War was disastrous for both Germany's future and for the Russian Soviet Federative Socialist Republic. During the war, the Bolsheviks struggled for survival, and Vladimir Lenin had no option except to recognize the independence of Finland, Estonia, Latvia, Lithuania and Poland. Moreover, facing a German military advance, Lenin and Leon Trotsky were forced to enter into the Treaty of Brest-Litovsk, which ceded large swathes of western Russian territory to the German Empire. On 11 November 1918, the Germans signed an armistice with the Allies, ending the First World War on the Western Front. After Germany's collapse, British, French and Japanese troops intervened in the Russian Civil War.

Initially, the Soviet leadership hoped for a successful socialist revolution in Germany as part of the "world revolution". However, the attempts to set up soviet-style republics in Germany were local and short-lived (Bavaria: 25 days; Bremen: 26 days; Würzburg: 3 days) or failed altogether (such as the Spartacist uprising). Subsequently, the Bolsheviks became embroiled in the Soviet war with Poland of 1919–1920. Because Poland was a traditional enemy of Germany (see e.g. Silesian Uprisings), and because the Soviet state was also isolated internationally, the Soviet government began to seek a closer relationship with Germany and therefore adopted a much less hostile attitude towards Germany. This line was consistently pursued under People's Commissar for Foreign Affairs Georgy Chicherin and Soviet Ambassador Nikolay Krestinsky. Other Soviet representatives instrumental in the negotiations were Karl Radek, Leonid Krasin, Christian Rakovsky, Victor Kopp and Adolph Joffe.

In the 1920s, many in the leadership of Weimar Germany, who felt humiliated by the conditions that the Treaty of Versailles had imposed after their defeat in the First World War (especially General Hans von Seeckt, chief of the Reichswehr), were interested in cooperation with the Soviet Union, both in order to avert any threat from the Second Polish Republic, backed by the French Third Republic, and to prevent any possible Soviet-British alliance. The specific German aims were the full rearmament of the Reichswehr, which was explicitly prohibited by the Treaty of Versailles, and an alliance against Poland. It is unknown exactly when the first contacts between von Seeckt and the Soviets took place, but it could have been as early as 1919–1921, or possibly even before the signing of the Treaty of Versailles.

On April 16, 1920, Victor Kopp, the RSFSR's special representative to Berlin, asked at the German Foreign Office whether "there was any possibility of combining the German and the Red Army for a joint war on Poland". This was yet another event at the start of military cooperation between the two countries, which ended before the German invasion of the Soviet Union on June 22, 1941.

By early 1921, a special group in the Reichswehr Ministry devoted to Soviet affairs, Sondergruppe R, had been created.

Weimar Germany's army had been limited to 100,000 men by the Treaty of Versailles, which also forbade the Germans to have aircraft, tanks, submarines, heavy artillery, poison gas, anti-tank weapons or many anti-aircraft guns. A team of inspectors from the League of Nations patrolled many German factories and workshops to ensure that these weapons were not being manufactured.

=== Treaty of Rapallo 1922 and secret military cooperation ===
The Treaty of Rapallo between Weimar Germany and Soviet Russia was signed by German Foreign Minister Walther Rathenau and his Soviet colleague Georgy Chicherin on April 16, 1922, during the Genoa Economic Conference, annulling all mutual claims, restoring full diplomatic relations, and establishing the beginnings of close trade relationships, which made Weimar Germany the main trading and diplomatic partner of the Soviet Union.

Rumors of a secret military supplement to the treaty soon spread. However, for a long time the consensus was that those rumors were wrong, and that Soviet-German military negotiations were independent of Rapallo and kept secret from the German Foreign Ministry for some time. This point of view was later challenged. On November 5, 1922, six other Soviet republics, which would soon join the Soviet Union, agreed to adhere to the Treaty of Rapallo as well.

The Soviets offered Weimar Germany facilities deep inside the USSR for building and testing arms and for military training, well away from Treaty inspectors' eyes. In return, the Soviets asked for access to German technical developments, and for assistance in creating a Red Army General Staff.

The first German officers went to Soviet Russia for these purposes in March 1922. One month later, Junkers began building aircraft at Fili, outside Moscow, in violation of Versailles. The joint factory built Junkers' most recent all-metal designs. Soviet aircraft designers learned new techniques at the factory, such as Andrei Tupolev and Pavel Sukhoi. After the factory was turned over to Soviet use, Soviet adaptations of the Junker bombers were manufactured there, such as the Tupolev TB-1 and Tupolev TB-3.

The great artillery manufacturer Krupp was soon active in the south of the USSR, near Rostov-on-Don. In 1925, a flying school was established near Lipetsk (Lipetsk fighter-pilot school) to train the first pilots for the future Luftwaffe. Since 1926, the Reichswehr had been able to use a tank school at Kazan (Kama tank school) and a chemical weapons facility in Saratov Oblast (Tomka gas test site). In turn, the Red Army gained access to these training facilities, as well as military technology and theory from Weimar Germany.

The Soviets offered submarine-building facilities at a port on the Black Sea, but this was not taken up. The Kriegsmarine did take up a later offer of a base near Murmansk, where German vessels could hide from the British. During the Cold War, this base at Polyarnyy (which had been built especially for the Germans) became the largest weapons store in the world.

==== Documentation ====
Most of the documents pertaining to secret German-Soviet military cooperation were systematically destroyed in Germany. The Polish and French intelligence communities of the 1920s were remarkably well-informed regarding the cooperation. This did not, however, have any immediate effect upon German relations with other European powers. After World War II, the papers of General Hans von Seeckt and memoirs of other German officers became available, and after the dissolution of the Soviet Union, a handful of Soviet documents regarding this were published.

=== Relations in the 1920s ===
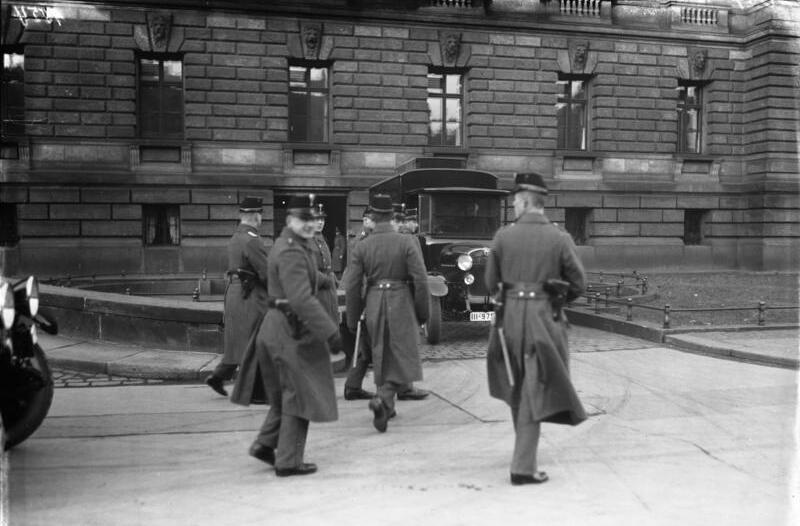
Cheka Trial in Leipzig, 1925

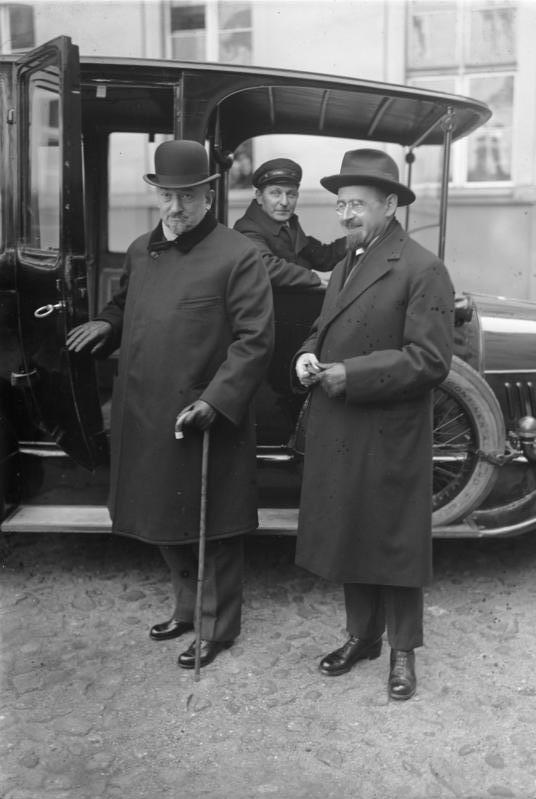
Georgy Chicherin and Nikolai Krestinsky in Berlin, 1925

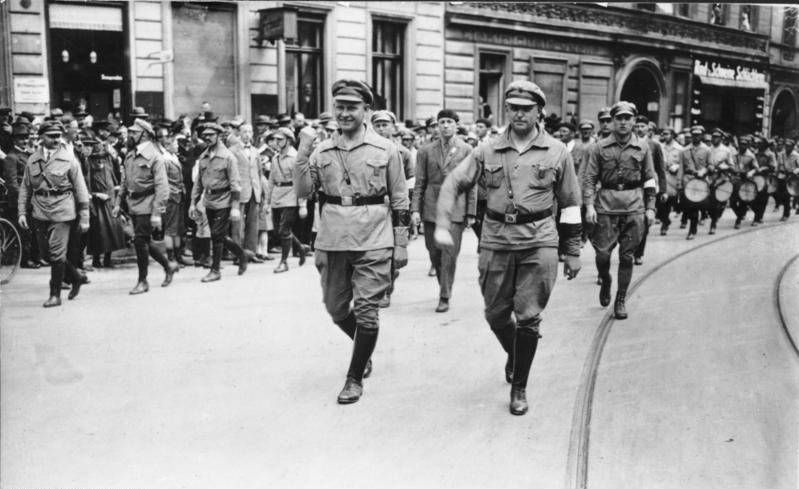
Ernst Thälmann and Willy Leow leading a demonstration of the Rotfrontkämpferbund in Berlin, 1927

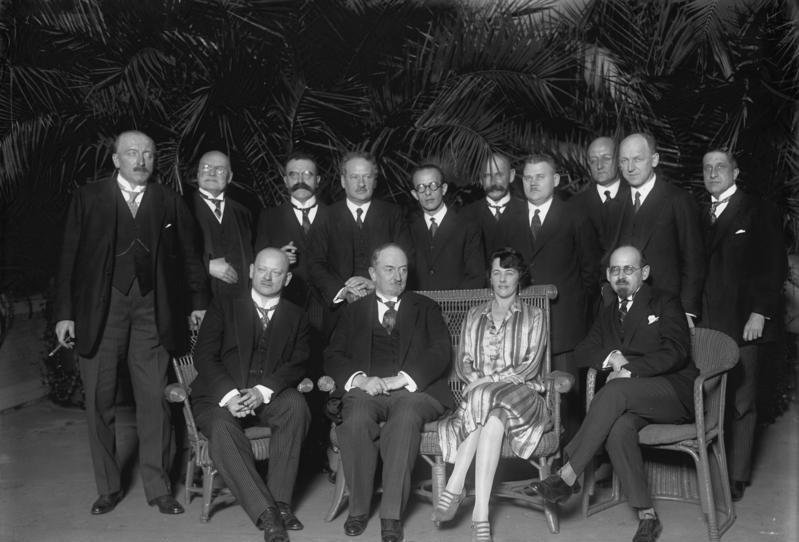
Gustav Stresemann, Georgy Chicherin, Mrs. Stresemann and Nikolai Krestinsky in Berlin, 1928

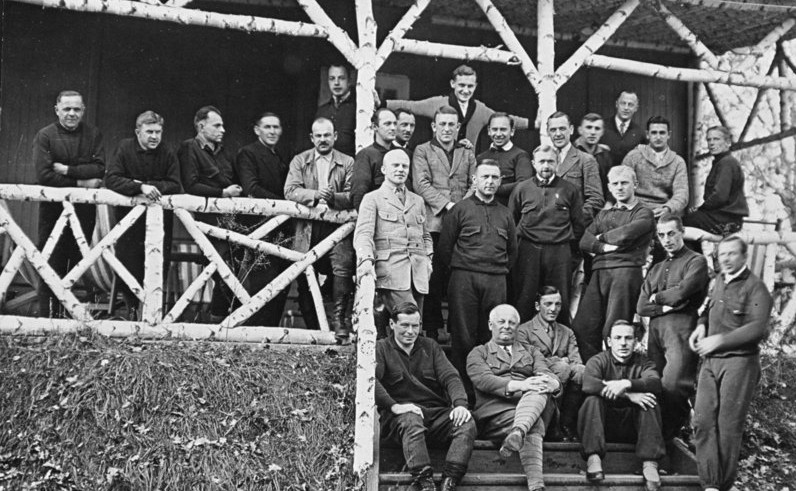
German staff at Tomka chemical weapons facility, Soviet Union, 1928

=== Trade ===
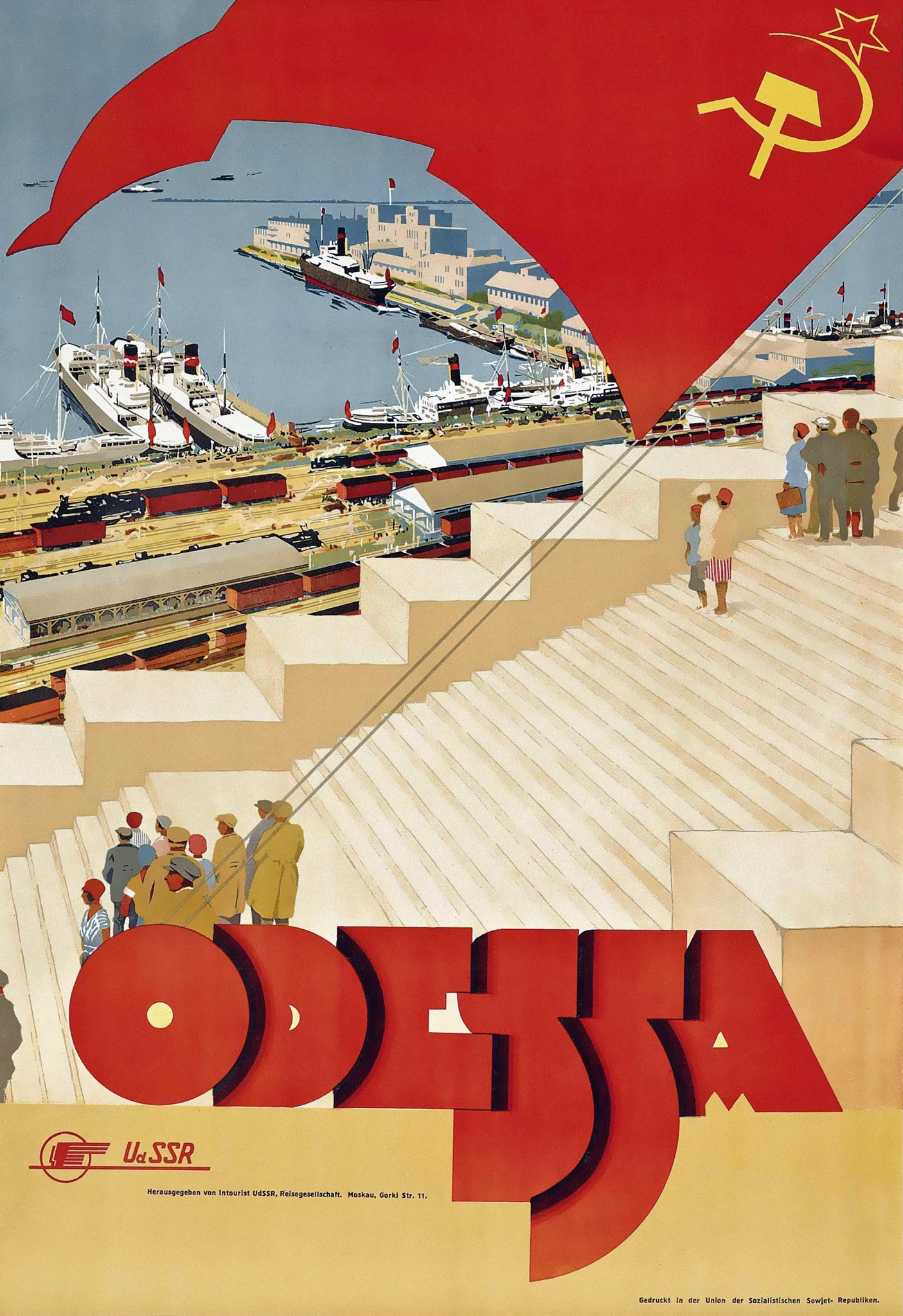
1930 tourism poster by Intourist encouraging Germans to visit Odessa

Since the late nineteenth century, Germany, which has few natural resources, had relied heavily upon Russian imports of raw materials. Before World War I, Germany imported 1.5 billion ℛ︁ℳ︁ of raw materials and other goods per year from Russia. This fell after World War I, but after trade agreements signed between the two countries in the mid-1920s, trade had increased to 433 million ℛ︁ℳ︁ per year by 1927. In the late 1920s, Germany helped Soviet industry begin to modernize, and to assist in the establishment of tank production facilities at the Leningrad Bolshevik Factory and the Kharkov Locomotive Factory.

Germany's fear of international isolation due to a possible Soviet rapprochement with France, the main German adversary, was a key factor in the acceleration of economic negotiations. On October 12, 1925, a commercial agreement between the two nations was concluded.

=== Plans for Poland ===
Alongside Soviet Russia's military and economic assistance, there was also political backing for Germany's aspirations. On July 19, 1920, Victor Kopp told the German Foreign Office that Soviet Russia wanted "a common frontier with Germany, south of Lithuania, approximately on a line with Białystok". In other words, Poland was to be partitioned once again. These promptings were repeated over the years, with the Soviets always anxious to stress that ideological differences between the two governments were of no account; all that mattered was that the two countries were pursuing the same foreign policy objectives.

On December 4, 1924, Victor Kopp, worried that the expected admission of Germany to the League of Nations (Germany was finally admitted to the League in 1926) was an anti-Soviet move, offered German Ambassador Ulrich Graf von Brockdorff-Rantzau to cooperate against the Second Polish Republic, and secret negotiations were sanctioned. However, the Weimar Republic rejected any venture into war.

=== Diplomatic relations ===
By 1919, both Germany and Russia were pariah nations in the eyes of democratic leaders. Both were excluded from major conferences and were deeply distrusted. The effect was to bring Moscow and Berlin closer together, most notably at Rapallo. German diplomats worried at the revolutionary nature of the Soviet Union, but were reassured by Lenin's New Economic Policy that seem to restore a semblance of capitalism. Berlin officials concluded that their policy of engagement was a success. However, in 1927 Berlin realized that the Comintern, and Stalin, did not reflect a retreat from revolutionary Marxist–Leninism.

In 1925, Germany broke its diplomatic isolation and took part in the Locarno Treaties with France and Belgium, undertaking not to attack them. The Soviet Union saw western European détente as potentially deepening its own political isolation in Europe, in particular by diminishing Soviet-German relationships. As Germany became less dependent on the Soviet Union, it became more unwilling to tolerate subversive Comintern interference: in 1925, several members of Rote Hilfe, a Communist Party organization, were tried for treason in Leipzig in what was known as the Cheka Trial.

On April 24, 1926, Weimar Germany and the Soviet Union concluded another treaty (Treaty of Berlin (1926)), declaring the parties' adherence to the Treaty of Rapallo and neutrality for five years. The treaty was signed by German Foreign Minister Gustav Stresemann and Soviet ambassador Nikolay Krestinsky. The treaty was perceived as an imminent threat by Poland (which contributed to the success of the May Coup in Warsaw), and with caution by other European states regarding its possible effect upon Germany's obligations as a party to the Locarno Agreements. France also voiced concerns in this regard in the context of Germany's expected membership in the League of Nations.

=== Third Period ===
In 1928, the 9th Plenum of the Executive Committee of the Communist International and its 6th Congress in Moscow favored Stalin's program over the line pursued by Comintern Secretary General Nikolay Bukharin. Unlike Bukharin, Stalin believed that a deep crisis in western capitalism was imminent, and he denounced the cooperation of international communist parties with social democratic movements, labelling them as social fascists, and insisted on a far stricter subordination of international communist parties to the Comintern, that is, to Soviet leadership. This was known as the Third Period. The policy of the Communist Party of Germany (KPD) under Ernst Thälmann was altered accordingly. The relatively independent KPD of the early 1920s almost completely subordinated itself to the Soviet Union.

Stalin's order that the German Communist party must never again vote with the Social Democrats coincided with his agreement, in December 1928, with what was termed the 'Union of Industrialists'. Under this agreement the Union of Industrialists agreed to provide the Soviet Union with an up-to-date armaments industry and the industrial base to support it, on two conditions:

Firstly, they required paying in hard currency or in goods, not in Soviet rubles. Stalin desperately wanted their weapons, including anti-aircraft guns, howitzers, anti-tank guns, machine guns etc., but he was critically short of money. As Russia had been a major wheat exporter before the First World War, he decided to expel his recalcitrant kulak peasant farmers to the wastes of Siberia and create huge collective farms on their land like the 50,000 hectare farm that Krupp had created in the North Caucasus. Thus, in 1930 and 1931, a huge deluge of Soviet wheat at slave labour prices flooded unsuspecting world markets, where surpluses already prevailed, thereby causing poverty and distress to North American farmers. However, Stalin secured the precious foreign currency to pay for German armaments.

Yet the Union of Industrialists were not only interested in cash for their weapons, they wanted a political concession. They feared the arrival of socialism in Germany and were irate at the KPD and the SPD objecting to providing funds for the development of new armored cruisers. Stalin would have had no compunction about ordering the German Communists to change sides if it suited his purpose. He had negotiated with the German armaments makers throughout the summer of 1928 and was determined to modernize his armed forces. From 1929 onwards, therefore, the Communists voted faithfully with the far right DNVP and Hitler's NSDAP in the Reichstag despite fighting them in the streets.

Relying on the foreign affairs doctrine pursued by the Soviet leadership in the 1920s, in his report of the Central Committee to the Congress of the All-Union Communist Party (b) on June 27, 1930, Joseph Stalin welcomed the international destabilization and rise of political extremism among the capitalist powers.

=== Early 1930s ===
The most intensive period of Soviet military collaboration with Weimar Germany was 1930–1932. On June 24, 1931, an extension of the 1926 Berlin Treaty was signed, though it was not until 1933 that it was ratified by the Reichstag due to internal political struggles. Some Soviet mistrust arose during the Lausanne Conference of 1932, when it was rumored that German Chancellor Franz von Papen had offered French Prime Minister Édouard Herriot a military alliance. The Soviets were also quick to develop their own relations with France and its main ally, Poland. This culminated in the conclusion of the Soviet-Polish Non-Aggression Pact on July 25, 1932, and the Soviet-French non-aggression pact on November 29, 1932.

The conflict between the KPD and the SPD fundamentally contributed to the ease with which Hitler's government replaced the Weimar Republic with the Third Reich. It is, however, disputed whether Hitler's seizure of power came as a surprise to the USSR. One author has claimed that Stalin accepted and even facilitated Hitler's rise in order to foster an inter-imperialist war, a theory dismissed by others.

During this period, trade between Germany and the Soviet Union declined as the more isolationist Stalinist regime asserted its power and as the abandonment of post-World War I military control decreased Germany's reliance on Soviet imports, such that Soviet imports fell to 223 million ℛ︁ℳ︁ by 1934.

=== Persecution of ethnic Germans in the Soviet Union ===
The USSR had a large population of ethnic Germans, especially in the Volga German Autonomous Soviet Socialist Republic, who were distrusted and persecuted by Stalin from 1928 to 1948. They were relatively well-educated, and at first, class factors played a major role, giving way after 1933 to ethnic links to the dreaded Nazi German regime as the chief criterion. Taxes escalated after the Operation Barbarossa. Some settlements were permanently banished to the east of the Urals.

== Nazi Germany and the Soviet Union before World War II ==
German documents pertaining to Soviet-German relations were captured by the American and British armies in 1945, and published by the U.S. Department of State shortly thereafter. In the Soviet Union and Russia, including in official speeches and historiography, Nazi Germany has generally been referred to as Fascist Germany (Russian: фашистская Германия) from 1933 until today.

=== Initial relations after Hitler's election ===
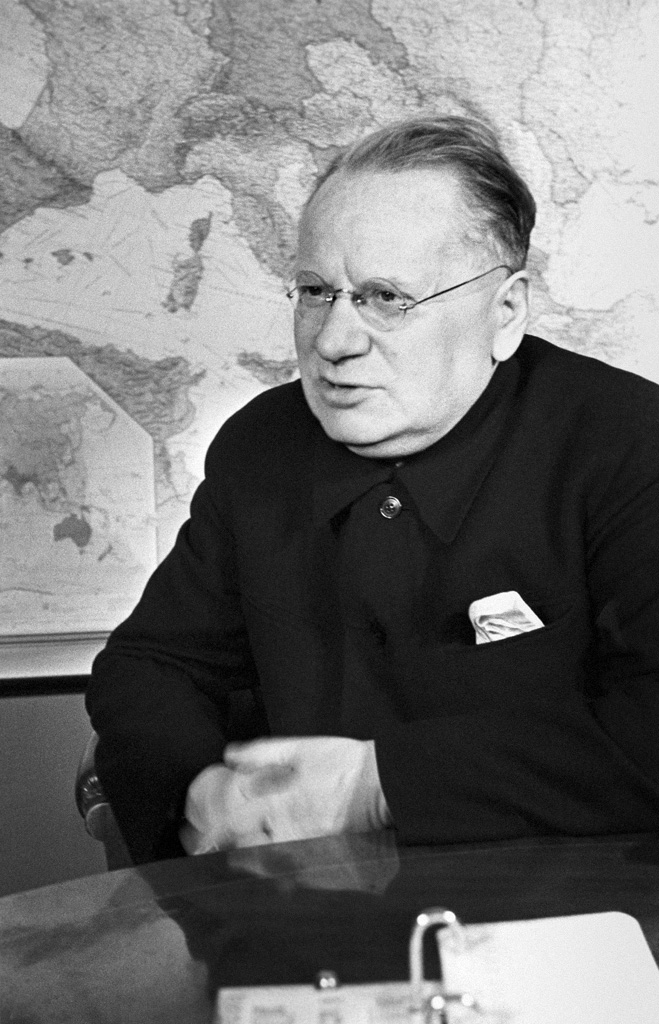
Maxim Litvinov considered Nazi Germany to be the greatest threat to the Soviet Union.

After Adolf Hitler came to power on January 30, 1933, he began the suppression of the Communist Party of Germany. The Nazis took police measures against Soviet trade missions, companies, press representatives, and individual citizens in Germany. They also launched an anti-Soviet propaganda campaign coupled with a lack of good will in diplomatic relations, although the German Foreign Ministry under Konstantin von Neurath (foreign minister from 1932 to 1938) was vigorously opposed to the impending breakup. The second volume of Hitler's programmatic Mein Kampf (which first appeared in 1926) called for Lebensraum (living space for the German nation) in the east (mentioning Russia specifically), and, in keeping with his world view, portrayed the Communists as Jews (see also Jewish Bolshevism) who were destroying a great nation.

Moscow's reaction to these steps of Berlin was initially restrained, with the exception of several tentative attacks on the new German government in the Soviet press. However, as the heavy-handed anti-Soviet actions of the German government continued unabated, the Soviets unleashed their own propaganda campaign against the Nazis, but by May the possibility of conflict appeared to have receded. The 1931 extension of the Berlin Treaty was ratified in Germany on May 5. In August 1933, Molotov assured German ambassador Herbert von Dirksen that Soviet-German relations would depend exclusively on the attitude of Germany towards the Soviet Union. However, Reichswehr access to the three military training and testing sites (Lipetsk, Kama, and Tomka) was abruptly terminated by the Soviet Union in August–September 1933. Political understanding between the Soviet Union and Nazi Germany was finally broken by the German-Polish Non-Aggression Pact of January 26, 1934, between Nazi Germany and the Second Polish Republic.

Maxim Litvinov, who had been People's Commissar for Foreign Affairs (Foreign Minister of the USSR) since 1930, considered Nazi Germany to be the greatest threat to the Soviet Union. However, as the Red Army was perceived as not strong enough, and the USSR sought to avoid becoming embroiled in a general European war, he began pursuing a policy of collective security, trying to contain Nazi Germany via cooperation with the League of Nations and the Western Powers. The Soviet attitude towards the League of Nations and international peace had changed. In 1933–34 the Soviet Union was diplomatically recognized for the first time by Spain, the United States, Hungary, Czechoslovakia, Romania, and Bulgaria, and ultimately joined the League of Nations in September 1934. It is often argued that the change in Soviet foreign policy happened around 1933–34, and that it was triggered by Hitler's assumption of power. However, the Soviet turn towards the French Third Republic in 1932, discussed above, could also have been a part of the policy change.

Hermann Rauschning in his 1940 book Hitler Speaks: A Series of Political Conversations With Adolf Hitler on His Real Aims 1934 records Adolf Hitler as speaking of an inescapable battle against both Pan-Slavism and Neo-Slavism. The authenticity of the book is controversial: some historians, such as Wolfgang Hänel, claim that the book is a fabrication, whereas others, such as Richard Steigmann-Gall, Ian Kershaw and Hugh Trevor-Roper, have avoided using it as a reference due to its questionable authenticity. Rauschning records Hitler as saying of the Slavs:

We cannot in any way evade the final battle between German race ideals and pan-Slav mass ideals. Here yawns the eternal abyss which no political interests can bridge. We must win the victory of German race-consciousness over the masses eternally fated to serve and obey. We alone can conquer the great continental space, and it will be done by us singly and alone, not through a pact with Moscow. We shall take this struggle upon us. It would open to us the door to permanent mastery of the world. That doesn't mean that I will refuse to walk part of the road with the Russians, if that will help us. But it will be only in order to return the more swiftly to our true aims.

— Adolf Hitler (1934)

Historian Eric D. Weitz discussed the areas of collaboration between the regimes in which hundreds of German citizens, the majority of whom were Communists, had been handed over to the Gestapo from Stalin's administration. Weitz also stated that a higher proportion of the KPD Politburo members had died in the Soviet Union than in Nazi Germany.

=== Relations in the mid-1930s ===
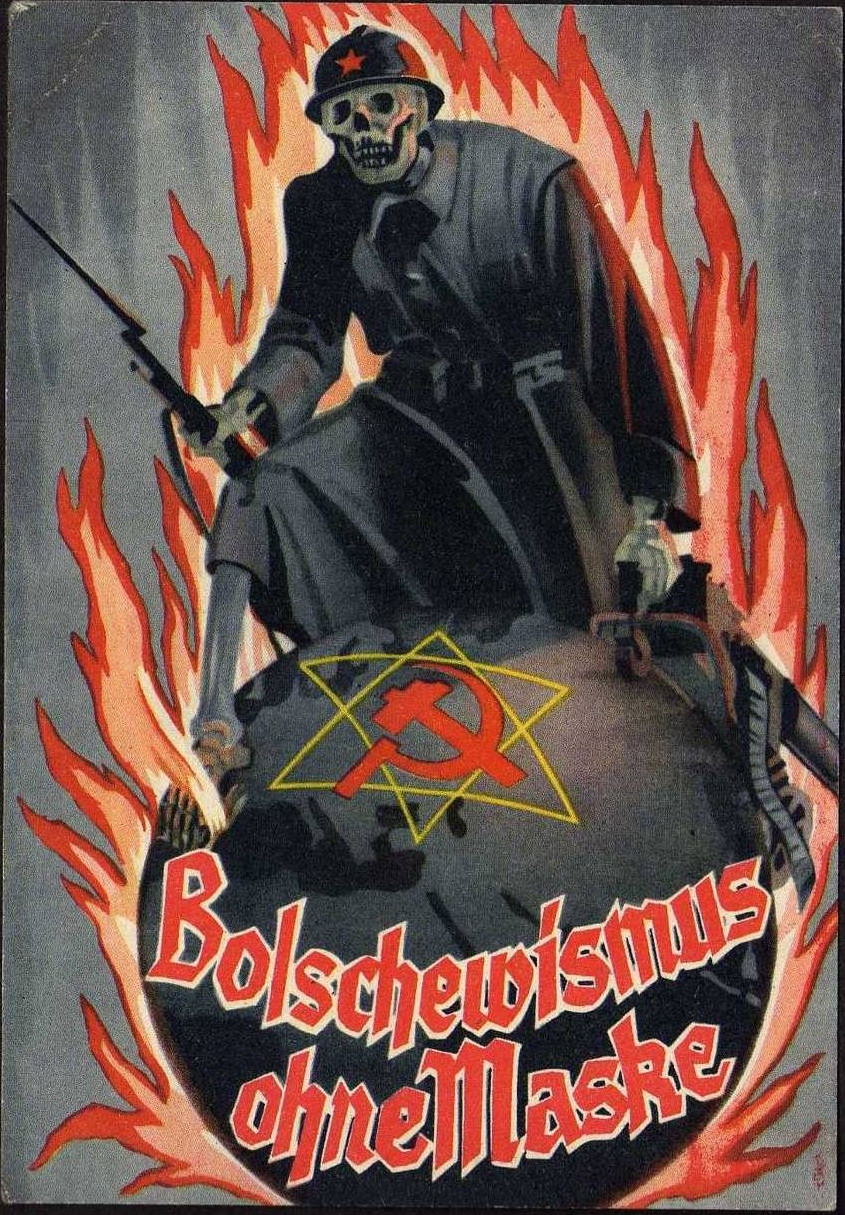
Anti-Soviet propaganda poster in Nazi Germany, 1939

On May 2, 1935, France and the USSR signed a five-year Franco-Soviet Treaty of Mutual Assistance. France's ratification of the treaty provided one of the reasons why Hitler remilitarized the Rhineland on March 7, 1936.

The 7th World Congress of the Comintern in 1935 officially endorsed the Popular Front strategy of forming broad alliances with parties willing to oppose fascism – Communist parties had started pursuing this policy from 1934. Also in 1935, at the 7th Congress of Soviets (in a study in contradiction), Molotov stressed the need for good relations with Berlin.

On November 25, 1936, Nazi Germany and Imperial Japan concluded the Anti-Comintern Pact, which Fascist Italy joined in 1937. (Although Italy had already signed the Italo-Soviet Pact in 1933) Economically, the Soviet Union made repeated efforts to reestablish closer contacts with Germany in the mid-1930s. The Soviet Union chiefly sought to repay debts from earlier trade with raw materials, while Germany sought to rearm. The two countries signed a credit agreement in 1935. By 1936, crises in the supply of raw materials and foodstuffs forced Hitler to decree a Four Year Plan for rearmament "without regard to costs". However, despite those issues, Hitler rebuffed the Soviet Union's attempts to seek closer political ties to Germany along with an additional credit agreement.

Litvinov's strategy faced ideological and political obstacles. The ruling Conservatives in the United Kingdom, whose National Government dominated the House of Commons from 1931 onwards, continued to regard the Soviet Union as no less of a threat than Nazi Germany (some saw the USSR as the greater threat). At the same time, as the Soviet Union underwent upheavals in the midst of the Great Purge of 1934–1940, the West or even Western leftists did not perceive it as a potentially valuable ally.

Further complicating matters, the purge of the People's Commissariat for Foreign Affairs forced the Soviet Union to close down quite a number of embassies abroad. At the same time, the purges made the signing of an economic deal with Germany less likely: they disrupted the already confused Soviet administrative structure necessary for negotiations and thus prompted Hitler to regard the Soviets as militarily weak.

=== Spanish Civil War ===
The Nationalists led by General Francisco Franco defeated the Republican government for control of Spain in a very bloody civil war, 1936–1939. Germany sent in elite air and tank units to the Nationalist forces; and Italy sent in several combat divisions. The Soviet Union sent military and political advisors, and sold munitions in support of the "Loyalist," or Republican, side. The Comintern helped Communist parties around the world send in volunteers to the International Brigades that fought for the Republican forces. The other major powers were neutral.

=== Collective security failures ===
Litvinov's policy of containing Germany via collective security failed utterly with the conclusion of the Munich Agreement on September 29, 1938, when Britain and France favored self-determination of the Sudetenland Germans over Czechoslovakia's territorial integrity, disregarding the Soviet position. However, it is still disputed whether, even before Munich, the Soviet Union would actually have fulfilled its guarantees to Czechoslovakia, in the case of an actual German invasion resisted by France.

In April 1939, Litvinov launched the tripartite alliance negotiations with the new British and French ambassadors, (William Seeds, assisted by William Strang, and Paul-Emile Naggiar), in an attempt to contain Germany. However, they were constantly dragged out and proceeded with major delays.

The Western powers believed that war could still be avoided and the USSR, much weakened by the purges, could not act as a main military participant. The USSR more or less disagreed with them on both issues, approaching the negotiations with caution because of the traditional hostility of the capitalist powers. The Soviet Union also engaged in secret talks with Nazi Germany, while conducting official ones with United Kingdom and France. From the beginning of the negotiations with France and Britain, the Soviets demanded that Finland be included in the Soviet sphere of influence.

== Molotov–Ribbentrop Pact ==
=== 1939 needs and discussions ===
By the late 1930s, because a German autarkic economic approach or an alliance with Britain was impossible, closer relations with the Soviet Union were necessary, if not just for economic reasons alone. Germany lacked oil, and could only supply 25 percent of its own needs, leaving Germany 2 million tons short a year and a staggering 10 million tons below planned mobilization totals, while the Soviet Union was required for numerous key other raw materials, such as ores (including iron and manganese), rubber and food fat and oils. While Soviet imports into Germany had fallen to 52.8 million ℛ︁ℳ︁ in 1937, massive armament production increases and critical raw material shortages caused Germany to turn to reverse their prior attitude, pushing forward economic talks in early 1939.

On May 3, 1939, Litvinov was dismissed and Vyacheslav Molotov, who had strained relations with Litvinov, was not of Jewish origin (unlike Litvinov), and had always been in favour of neutrality towards Germany, was put in charge of foreign affairs. The Foreign Affairs Commissariat was purged of Litvinov's supporters and Jews. All this could well have purely internal reasons, but it could also be a signal to Germany that the era of anti-German collective security was past, or a signal to the British and French that Moscow should be taken more seriously in the tripartite alliance negotiations and that it was ready for arrangements without the old baggage of collective security, or even both.

The reshuffle was warily perceived by Germany as an opportunity.

It is sometimes argued that Molotov continued the talks with Britain and France to stimulate the Germans into making an offer of a non-aggression treaty and that the triple alliance failed because of the Soviet determination to conclude a pact with Germany. Another point of view is that the Soviet's pursuit of a triple alliance was sincere and that the Soviet government turned to Germany only when an alliance with the Western powers proved impossible.

Additional factors that drove the Soviet Union towards a rapprochement with Germany might be the signing of a non-aggression pact between Germany, Latvia and Estonia on June 7, 1939 and the threat from Imperial Japan in the East, as evidenced by the Battle of Khalkhin Gol (May 11 – September 16, 1939). Molotov suggested that the Japanese attack might have been inspired by Germany in order to hinder the conclusion of the tripartite alliance.

In July, open Soviet–German trade negotiations were under way. In late July and early August, talks between the parties turned to a potential deal, but Soviet negotiators made clear that an economic deal must first be worked out. After Germany had scheduled its invasion of Poland on August 25, and prepared for the resulting war with France, German war planners estimated that a British naval blockade would further exacerbate critical German raw material shortages for which the Soviet Union was the only potential supplier.

Then, on August 3, German Foreign Minister Joachim Ribbentrop outlined a plan in which Germany and the Soviet Union would agree to nonintervention in each other's affairs and would renounce measures aimed at the other's vital interests and that "there was no problem between the Baltic and the Black Sea that could not be solved between the two of us." The Germans stated that "there is one common element in the ideology of Germany, Italy and the Soviet Union: opposition to the capitalist democracies of the West", and explained that their prior hostility toward Soviet Bolshevism had subsided with the changes in the Comintern and with the Soviet renunciation of a world revolution.

=== Pact and commercial deal signings ===
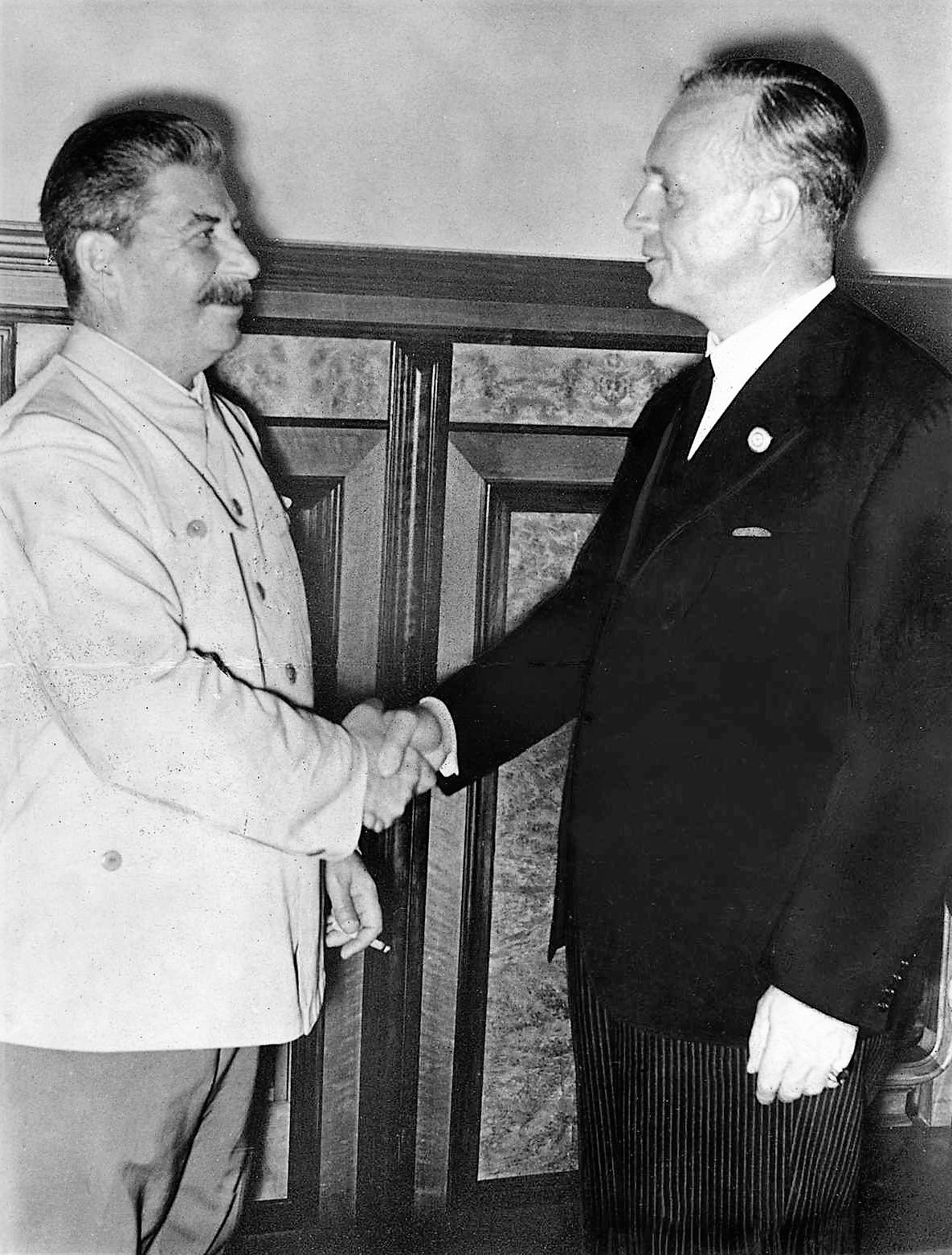
Stalin welcoming Ribbentrop in the Kremlin, August 23, 1939

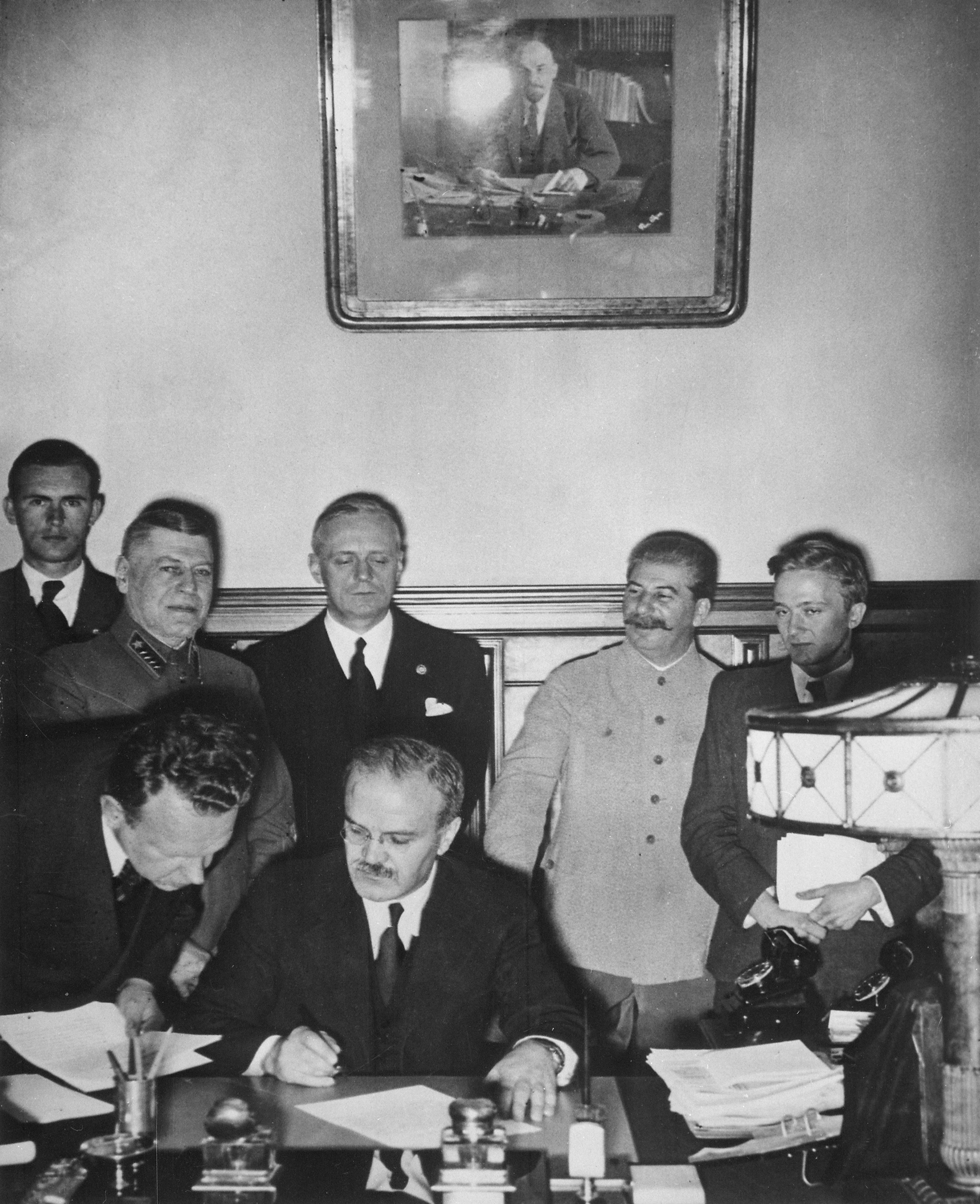
Signing of the German-Soviet Boundary and Friendship Treaty. Joseph Stalin is the second from the right, smiling.

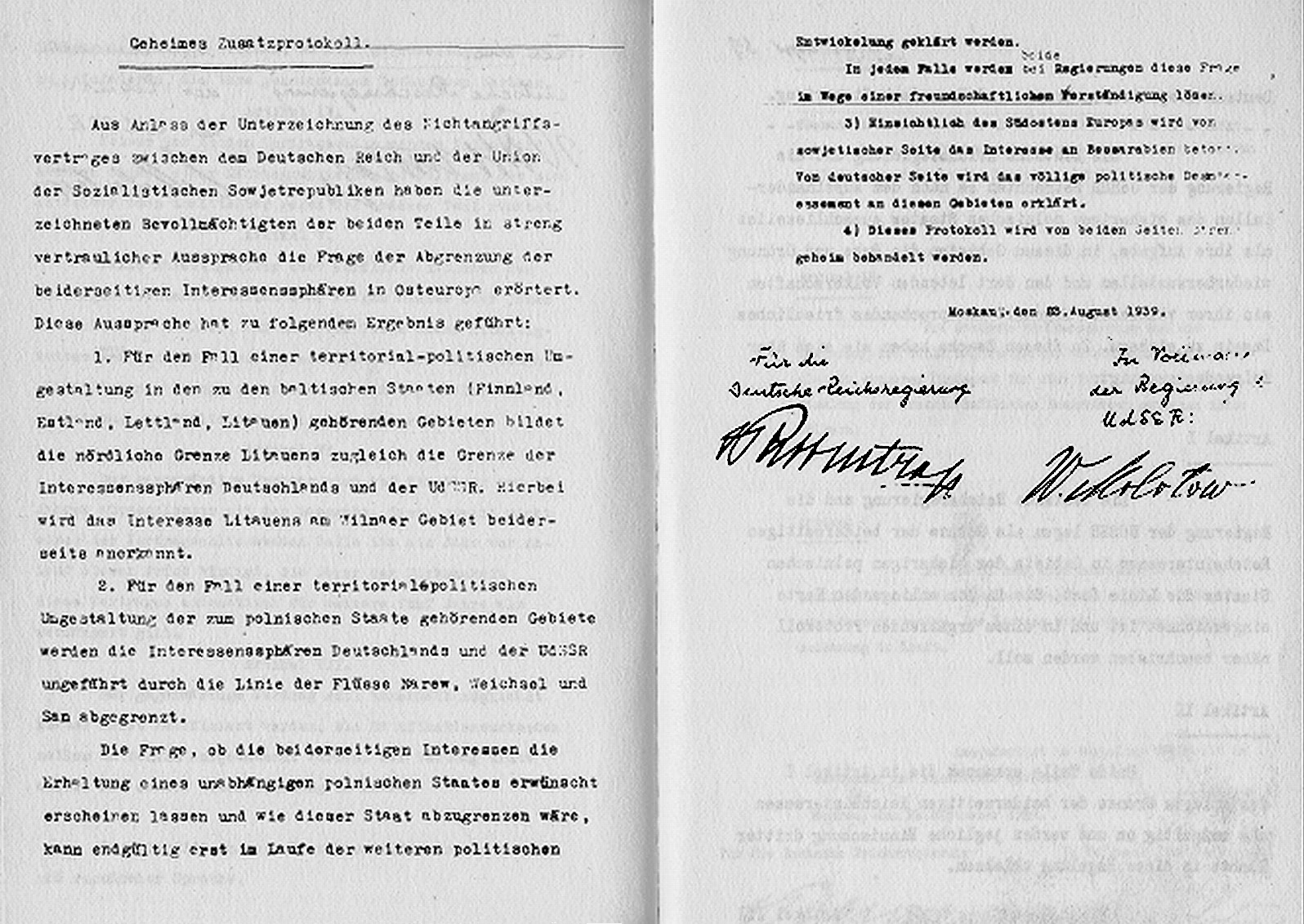
Signatures on the secret protocol

Planned and actual divisions of Europe, according to the Molotov–Ribbentrop Pact, with later adjustments

By August 10, the countries had worked out the last minor technical details to make all but final their economic arrangement, but the Soviets delayed signing that agreement for almost ten days until they were sure that they had reached a political agreement with Germany. The Soviet ambassador explained to German officials that the Soviets had begun their British negotiations "without much enthusiasm" at a time when they felt Germany would not "come to an understanding", and the parallel talks with the British could not be simply broken off when they had been initiated after 'mature consideration.' Meanwhile, every internal German military and economic study had argued that Germany was doomed to defeat without at least Soviet neutrality.

On August 19, the German–Soviet Commercial Agreement (1939) was reached. The agreement covered "current" business, which entailed a Soviet obligation to deliver 180 million ℛ︁ℳ︁ in raw materials in response to German orders, while Germany would allow the Soviets to order 120 million ℛ︁ℳ︁ for German industrial goods. Under the agreement, Germany also granted the Soviet Union a merchandise credit of 200 million ℛ︁ℳ︁ over 7 years to buy German manufactured goods at an extremely favorable interest rate.

On August 22 the secret political negotiations were revealed when German newspapers announced that the Soviet Union and Nazi Germany were about to conclude a non-aggression pact, and that the Soviet Union's prolonged negotiations regarding a Triple Alliance with France and Britain had been suspended. The Soviets blamed on the Western powers their reluctance to take the Soviet Union's military assistance seriously and to acknowledge the Soviet right to cross Poland and Romania, if necessary against their will, and furthermore their failure to send representatives with more importance and clearly defined powers and to resolve the disagreement over the notion of "indirect aggression".

On August 23, 1939, a German delegation headed by Foreign Minister Joachim von Ribbentrop arrived to Moscow, and in the following night, the Molotov–Ribbentrop Pact was signed by him and his Soviet colleague Vyacheslav Molotov, in the presence of Soviet leader Joseph Stalin. The ten-year pact of non-aggression declared both parties' continued adherence to the Treaty of Berlin (1926), but the pact was also supplemented by a secret additional protocol, which divided Eastern Europe into German and Soviet zones of influence:

1. In the event of a territorial and political rearrangement in the areas belonging to the Baltic States (Finland, Estonia, Latvia, Lithuania), the northern boundary of Lithuania shall represent the boundary of the spheres of influence of Germany and the U.S.S.R. In this connection the interest of Lithuania in the Vilna area is recognized by each party.

2. In the event of a territorial and political rearrangement of the areas belonging to the Polish state the spheres of influence of Germany and the U.S.S.R. shall be bounded approximately by the line of the rivers Narew, Vistula, and San.

The question of whether the interests of both parties make desirable the maintenance of an independent Polish state and how such a state should be bounded can only be definitely determined in the course of further political developments.

In any event both Governments will resolve this question by means of a friendly agreement.

3. With regard to Southeastern Europe attention is called by the Soviet side to its interest in Bessarabia. The German side declares its complete political disinterestedness in these areas.

The secret protocol shall be treated by both parties as strictly secret.

Though the parties denied its existence, the protocol was rumored to exist from the very beginning.

The news of the Pact, which was announced by Pravda and Izvestia on August 24, was met with utter shock and surprise by government leaders and media worldwide, most of whom were aware of only the British-French-Soviet negotiations, which had taken place for months. British and French negotiators, who were in Moscow negotiating what they thought would be the military part of an alliance with the Soviet Union, were told "no useful purpose can be served in continuing the conversation." On August 25, Hitler told the British ambassador to Berlin that the pact with the Soviets freed Germany from the prospect of a two front war, thereby changing the strategic situation from that which had prevailed in World War I, and that therefore Britain should accept his demands regarding Poland. However, Hitler was surprised when Britain signed a mutual-assistance treaty with Poland that day, causing Hitler to delay the planned August 26 invasion of western Poland.

The pact was ratified by the Supreme Soviet of the Soviet Union on August 31, 1939.

== World War II ==
=== German invasion of western Poland ===
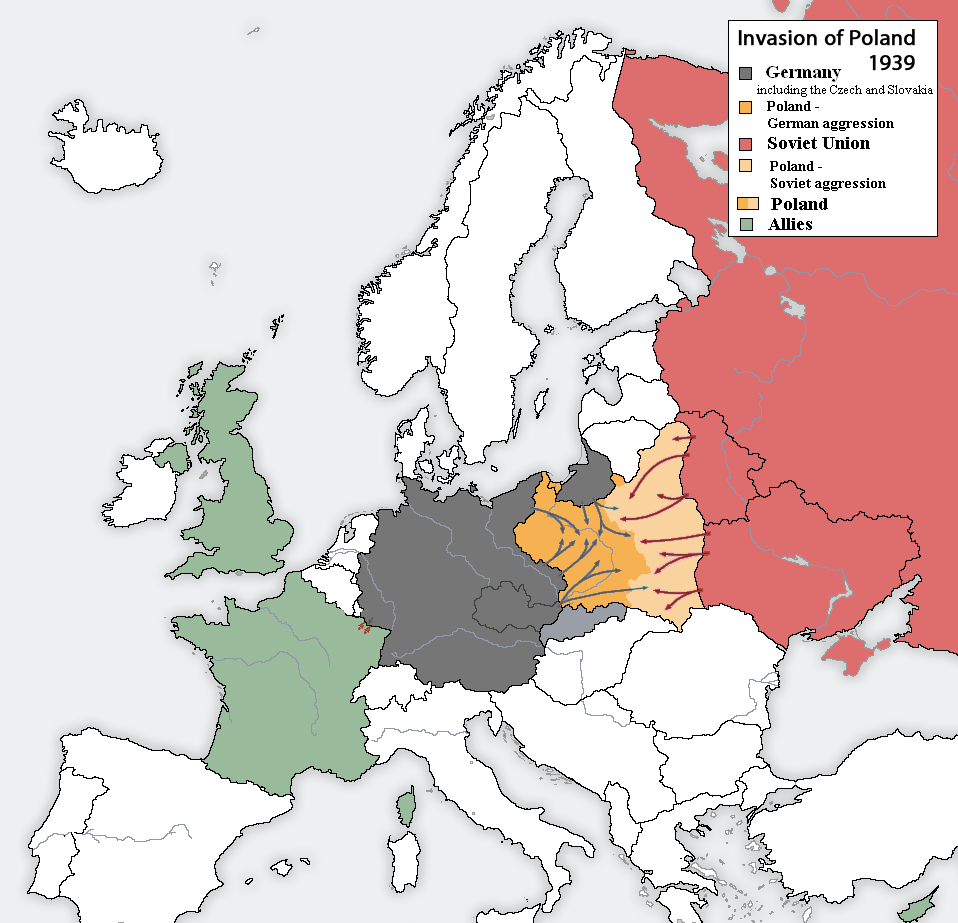
Invasion of Poland: Germany (grey), the Soviet Union (red) and the European allies of Poland (green)

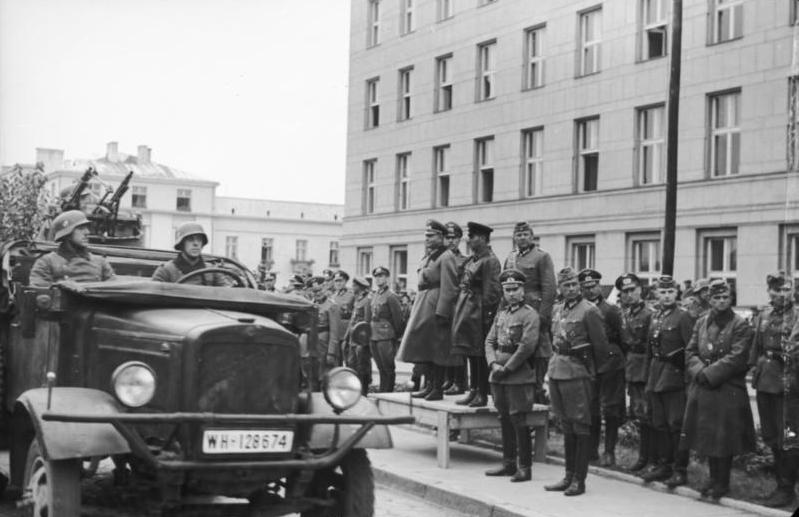
German General Heinz Guderian and Soviet Combrig Semyon Krivoshein holding a joint victory parade in Brest, September 23, 1939

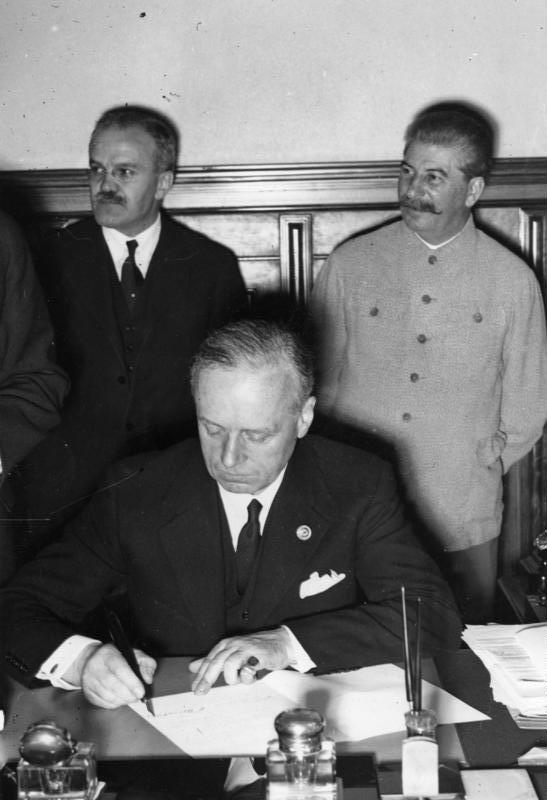
Molotov, Stalin and Ribbentrop signing the German–Soviet Boundary and Friendship Treaty, Moscow, September 1939

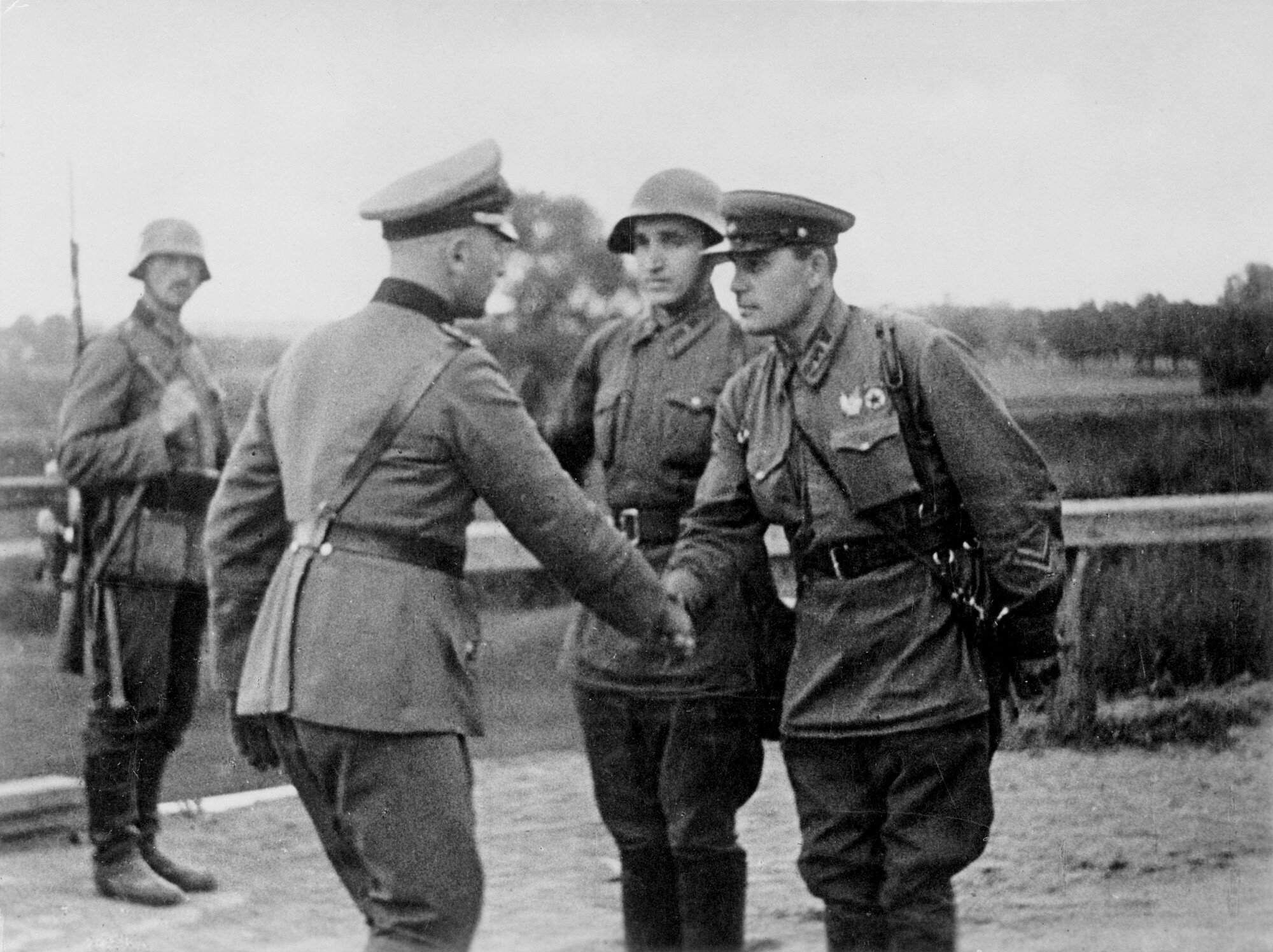
German and Soviet officer shaking hands in September 1939, following the invasion of Poland

A week after having signed the Molotov–Ribbentrop Pact, on September 1, 1939, Nazi Germany invaded its zone of influence in Poland. On September 3, the United Kingdom, Australia, New Zealand and France, fulfilling their obligations to the Second Polish Republic, declared war on Germany. The Second World War broke out in Europe.

On September 4, as Britain blockaded Germany at sea, German cargo ships heading towards German ports were diverted to the Soviet Arctic port of Murmansk. On September 8 the Soviet side agreed to pass it by railway to the Soviet Baltic Sea port of Leningrad. At the same time the Soviet Union refused to allow a Polish transit through its territory citing the threat of being drawn into war on September 5.

Von der Schulenburg reported to Berlin that attacks on the conduct of Germany in the Soviet press had ceased completely and the portrayal of events in the field of foreign politics largely coincided with the German point of view, while anti-German literature had been removed from the trade.

On September 7 Stalin once again outlined a new line for the Comintern that was now based on the idea that the war was an inter-imperialist conflict and hence there was no reason for the working class to side with Britain, France, or Poland against Germany, thus departing from the Comintern's anti-fascist popular front policy of 1934–1939. He labeled Poland as a fascist state oppressing Belarusians and Ukrainians.

German diplomats had urged the Soviet Union to intervene against Poland from the east since the beginning of the war, but the Soviet Union was reluctant to intervene as Warsaw had not yet fallen. The Soviet decision to invade that part of eastern of Poland which had earlier been agreed as the Soviet zone of influence was communicated to the German ambassador Friedrich Werner von der Schulenburg on September 9, but the actual invasion was delayed for more than a week. The Polish intelligence became aware of the Soviet plans around September 12.

=== Soviet invasion of eastern Poland ===
On September 17 the Soviet Union finally entered the Polish territories that had been granted to it by the secret protocol of non-aggression pact from the east. As the pretexts to justify their actions, the Soviets cited the collapse of the Second Polish Republic and they claimed that they were trying to help the Belarusian and Ukrainian people. The Soviet invasion is usually considered direct result of the pact, although the revisionist school contends that this was not the case and that the Soviet decision was taken a few weeks later. The Soviet move was denounced by Britain and France, but they did not intervene. In an exchange of captured Polish territories in compliance with the terms of the protocol, already on September 17 the Red Army and Wehrmacht held a joint military parade in Brest; occupation of the city was then transferred by Germany to the Soviet troops. In the following battles with the rest of the Second Polish Republic's army, the Soviet Union occupied the territories roughly corresponding to its sphere of interests, as defined in the secret additional protocol to the Molotov–Ribbentrop Pact.

The territory of Poland had been completely occupied by the two powers by October 6, and the Polish state was liquidated. In early November the Supreme Soviet of the Soviet Union annexed the occupied territories and the Soviet Union shared a common border with Nazi Germany, the Nazi-occupied Polish territories and Lithuania for the first time. After the invasion, cooperation between Germany and the Soviet Union was visible, for example, in the four Gestapo–NKVD conferences, where the occupying powers discussed plans for dealing with the Polish resistance movement, for the further destruction of Poland, and which enabled both parties to exchange Polish prisoners of interest prior to the signing of German–Soviet Boundary and Friendship Treaty in Moscow in the presence of Joseph Stalin. The cooperation between Gestapo and NKVD continued, resulting in further exchanges of prisoners, among them Margarete Buber-Neumann, Alexander Weissberg-Cybulski, Betty Olberg and Max Zucker.

=== Amendment of the Secret Protocols ===
On September 25, when Hitler was still going to proceed to Lithuania, the Soviet Union proposed to renegotiate the spheres of interest. On September 28, 1939, in Moscow Molotov and Ribbentrop signed the German–Soviet Boundary and Friendship Treaty, determining the boundary of their respective national interests in the territory of the former Polish state. In a secret supplementary protocol to the treaty the spheres of interest outside Poland were renegotiated, and in exchange for some already captured portions of the Polish territory Germany acknowledged still independent Lithuania part of the Soviet zone.

=== Expanded commercial pact ===
Germany and the Soviet Union entered an intricate trade pact on February 11, 1940, that was over four times larger than the one the two countries had signed in August 1939. The trade pact helped Germany to surmount a British blockade of Germany. In the first year, Germany received one million tons of cereals, half a million tons of wheat, 900,000 tons of oil, 100,000 tons of cotton, 500,000 tons of phosphates and considerable amounts of other vital raw materials, along with the transit of one million tons of soybeans from Manchukuo. These and other supplies were being transported through Soviet and occupied Polish territories, and this allowed Nazi Germany to circumvent the British naval blockade. The Soviets were to receive a naval cruiser, the plans to the battleship Bismarck, heavy naval guns, other naval gear and thirty of Germany's latest warplanes, including the Bf 109 fighter, Bf 110 fighter and Ju 88 bomber. The Soviets would also receive oil and electric equipment, locomotives, turbines, generators, diesel engines, ships, machine tools and samples of Germany artillery, tanks, explosives, chemical-warfare equipment and other items. The Soviet Navy also helped Germany to avoid British naval blockades by providing a submarine base, Basis Nord, in the Russian Far North near Murmansk. This also provided a refueling and maintenance location, and a takeoff point for raids and attacks on shipping.

=== Soviet war with Finland ===
The last negotiations with Finland had been initiated by the Soviet side as part of its collective security policy in April 1938, and aimed to reach an understanding and to secure a favorable Finnish position in case of a German attack on the Soviet Union through Finnish territory, but this had proven futile due to the Finnish reluctance to break its neutrality, and negotiations ended in April 1939, shortly before Litvinov's dismissal. On October 13, 1939, new negotiations started in Moscow, and the Soviet Union (represented by Stalin, Molotov, and Vladimir Potyomkin) presented Finland with proposals including a mutual assistance pact, the lease of the military base of Hanko, and the cession of a 70 km-deep area on the Karelian Isthmus located immediately to the north of the city of Leningrad to the Soviet Union, in exchange for border lands further to the north. Finland, however, refused to accept the offer, withdrew from negotiations on November 7, 1939, and continued preparations for a possible Soviet invasion.

On November 26, the Soviet Union staged the shelling of Mainila near the border, accused Finnish troops of the provocation and requesting their withdrawal. In turn, on November 27 Finland requested a withdrawal of troops of both nations from the border area. On November 28, the Soviet Union denounced the 1932 Soviet–Finnish Non-Aggression Pact, and on November 29 broke off diplomatic relations with Finland. On November 30, 1939, forces of the USSR under the command of Kliment Voroshilov attacked Finland in what became known as the Winter War, starting with the invasion of Finnish Karelia and bombing civilian boroughs of Helsinki. On December 1, 1939, the puppet socialist government of the Finnish Democratic Republic was established under the auspices of the Soviet Union in the border town of Terijoki. On December 14 the Soviet Union was expelled from the League of Nations for waging a war of aggression. After presiding over the disastrous start of the campaign, and a disproportionally heavy death toll of Red Army soldiers, Voroshilov was replaced by Semyon Timoshenko as the commander of the front on January 7, 1940 (and four months later as People's Commissar for Defense). In mid-February, 1940, Soviet troops finally managed to break through the Mannerheim Line, and Finland sought an armistice.

The Moscow Peace Treaty was signed on March 12, 1940, and at noon the following day the fighting ended. Finland ceded the Karelian Isthmus and Ladoga Karelia, part of Salla and Kalastajasaarento, and leased the Hanko naval base to the USSR, but remained a neutral state, albeit increasingly leaning toward Germany (see Interim Peace).

The consequences of the conflict were multiple: Although the Soviet Union gained new territories, the war pushed neutral Finland towards an accommodation with Nazi Germany. Furthermore, the invasion had revealed the striking military weaknesses of the Red Army. This prompted the Soviet Union to reorganize its military forces, but it also dealt yet another blow to the international prestige of the USSR.

As a result of having suffered disproportionately high losses compared to the Finnish troops — despite a fourfold Soviet superiority in troops and nearly absolute superiority in heavy weapons and aircraft — the Red Army appeared to be an easy target, which contributed to Hitler's decision to plan an attack against the Soviet Union. Soviet official casualty counts in the war exceeded 200,000, while Soviet Premier Nikita Khrushchev later claimed the casualties may have been one million.

=== Soviets take the three Baltic countries ===
From the beginning, there was tension over the Soviets' moves in Estonia, Latvia and Lithuania, which were in the Soviet sphere of influence. All three governments were presented with Stalin's ultimatums threatening with war, and had no other choice but to sign a so-called "Treaty of defence and mutual assistance" which permitted the Soviet Union to establish a number of military bases on their soil. Nazi Germany advised them to accept the conditions. The three Baltic countries acceded to the Soviet demands and signed the "mutual assistance treaties" on September 28, October 5, and October 10, 1939, respectively (for 10 years for Estonia and Latvia and 15 years for Lithuania). The tension included the internment of a Polish Navy submarine crew in the Orzeł incident. On October 18, October 29, and November 3, 1939, the first Soviet troops moved into the military bases in Estonia, Latvia, and Lithuania under the treaties.

The Soviet Union had expressed discontent with the three Baltic countries' leaning toward Britain and France, and the so-called Baltic Entente of 1934, which could have ostensibly been reoriented toward Germany, and later used it to accuse the Baltic governments of a violation of the "mutual assistance treaties" of the autumn of 1939. On May 25, 1940, after several Soviet soldiers had allegedly disappeared from Soviet garrisons in Lithuania, Molotov accused the city of Kaunas of provocations. On June 14, People's Commissar of Defence Timoshenko ordered a complete blockade of Estonia, Latvia, and Lithuania. The Soviet air force shot down a Finnish passenger plane Kaleva heading from Tallinn towards Helsinki. Shortly before midnight, Molotov presented Lithuania with a ten-hour ultimatum, demanding the replacement of the Lithuanian government with a pro-Soviet one and free access for additional Soviet troops, threatening the country with immediate occupation otherwise.

Lithuanian President Antanas Smetona insisted on armed resistance, but was not supported by the military leadership, so Lithuania acceded to the ultimatum. The government was reshuffled and additional Soviet troops entered Lithuania. Vladimir Dekanozov was sent to Kaunas as the Soviet special envoy. The following night, Smetona fled to Germany (and later to Switzerland, and then to the United States). On June 16, Molotov presented similar ultimatums to Latvia and Estonia, citing Soviet concerns over the Baltic Entente, and they acceded as well. At the same time, the Wehrmacht started concentrating along the Lithuanian border.

In mid-June 1940, when international attention was focused on the German invasion of France, Soviet NKVD troops raided border posts in Lithuania, Estonia and Latvia. State administrations were liquidated and replaced by Soviet cadres; as a result, 34,250 Latvians, 75,000 Lithuanians and almost 60,000 Estonians were deported or killed. Elections were held with single pro-Soviet candidates listed for many positions, with resulting peoples assemblies immediately requested admission into the USSR, which was granted by the Soviet Union.

=== Soviet occupation of Bessarabia and Northern Bukovina ===
With France no longer in a position to be the guarantor of the status quo in Eastern Europe, and the Third Reich pushing Romania to make concessions to the Soviet Union, the Romanian government gave in, following Italy's counsel and Vichy France's recent example.

=== August tensions ===
The Finnish and Baltic invasions caused a deterioration of relations between Germany and the Soviet Union. Because of tensions caused by these invasions, Germany's falling behind in deliveries of goods, and Stalin's worries that Hitler's war with the West might end quickly after France signed an armistice, in August 1940, the Soviet Union briefly suspended its deliveries under the German-Soviet Commercial Agreement. The suspension created significant resource problems for Germany. By the end of August, relations improved again.

=== Soviet negotiations regarding joining the Axis ===
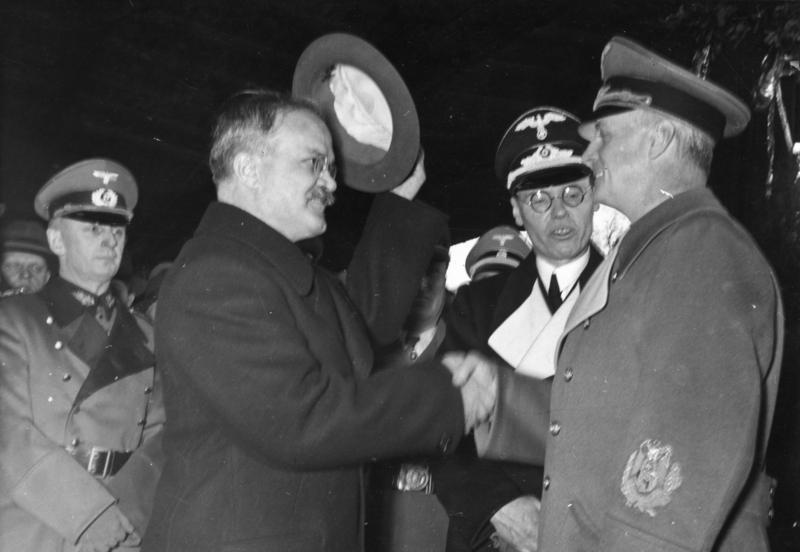
Joachim von Ribbentrop welcoming Vyacheslav Molotov in Berlin, November 1940

After Germany entered a Tripartite Pact with Japan and Italy, in October 1940, Ribbentrop wrote to Stalin about "the historical mission of the Four Powers – the Soviet Union, Italy, Japan and Germany – to adopt a long range-policy and to direct the future development of their peoples into the right channels by delimitation of their interests in a worldwide scale." Stalin replied, referencing entering an agreement regarding a "permanent basis" for their "mutual interests." Stalin sent Molotov to Berlin to negotiate the terms for the Soviet Union to join the Axis powers and potentially enjoy the spoils of the pact.

Ribbentrop asked Molotov to sign another secret protocol with the statement: "The focal point of the territorial aspirations of the Soviet Union would presumably be centered south of the territory of the Soviet Union in the direction of the Indian Ocean." Molotov took the position that he could not take a "definite stand" on this without Stalin's agreement. In response to a written German draft four powers agreement, Stalin presented a written counterproposal, including the Soviets joining the four power Axis if Germany foreclosed acting in the Soviet's sphere of influence. Germany never responded to the counterproposal.

=== January 1941 Border and Commercial Agreement ===
On January 10, 1941, Germany and the Soviet Union signed an agreement that settled several ongoing issues. The agreement formally set the border between Germany and the Soviet Union between the Igorka river and the Baltic Sea, It extended trade regulation of the 1940 German–Soviet Commercial Agreement until August 1, 1942, increased deliveries above the levels of year one of that agreement, settled trading rights in the Baltics and Bessarabia, calculated the compensation for German property interests in the Baltic States now occupied by the Soviets and other issues. It also covered the migration to Germany within two and a half months of ethnic Germans and German citizens in Soviet-held Baltic territories, and the migration to the Soviet Union of Baltic and "White Russian" "nationals" in German-held territories. Secret protocols in the new agreement stated that Germany would renounce its claims to one piece of Lithuanian territory in the "Secret Additional Protocols" of the German–Soviet Boundary and Friendship Treaty and would be paid 7.5 million dollars (31.5 million ℛ︁ℳ︁).

The agreements provided the USSR with new weapons, while in return it provided Germany with a million tons of feed grains, nine hundred thousand tons of oil, half a million tons of phosphate, half a million tons of iron ore, plus chromium and other raw materials.

=== Mid-1941 relations ===
In an effort to demonstrate peaceful intentions toward Germany, on April 13, 1941, the Soviets signed a neutrality pact with Axis power Japan. While Stalin had little faith in Japan's commitment to neutrality, he felt that the pact was important for its political symbolism, to reinforce a public affection for Germany.

Stalin felt that there was a growing split in German circles about whether Germany should initiate a war with the Soviet Union. Stalin did not know that Hitler had been secretly discussing an invasion of the Soviet Union since the summer of 1940, and that Hitler had ordered his military in late 1940 to prepare for war in the east regardless of the parties' talks of a potential Soviet entry as a fourth Axis power.

On 1 May 1941, German military delegation, including Ernst August Köstring and Hans Krebs, attended the Soviet military parade in Moscow in honour of International Workers' Day.

=== Further development ===
During 1940, Nazi Germany pursued its conquest of western Europe: On April 9, 1940, Germany invaded Denmark and Norway. On May 15, the Netherlands capitulated. By June 2, Germany had occupied Belgium. On June 14, Wehrmacht entered Paris. On June 22, France surrendered.

The British historians Alan S. Milward and W. Medicott show that Nazi Germany — unlike Imperial Germany — was prepared only for a short war (Blitzkrieg). According to Andreas Hillgruber, without the necessary supplies from the USSR and strategic security in the East, Germany could not have succeeded in the West. Had the Soviet Union joined the Anglo-French blockade, the German war economy would have soon collapsed. If Germany had been forced to rely on its own raw materials as of September 1939, those resources would have lasted a mere 9 to 12 months.

According to Mr. Rapoport, "one of Stalin's first gifts to the Nazis was to turn over some 600 German Communists, most of them Jews, to the Gestapo at Brest-Litovsk in German-occupied Poland." The Soviets also offered support to the Nazis in official statements: Joseph Stalin himself emphasized that it was the Anglo-French alliance that had attacked Germany, not the other way around, and Molotov claimed that Germany had made peace efforts, which had been turned down by 'Anglo-French imperialists'.

By invading Poland and annexing the Baltic States, Nazi Germany and the Soviet Union eliminated the buffer states between them and magnified the threat of war.

== Volksdeutsche in the Soviet Union ==
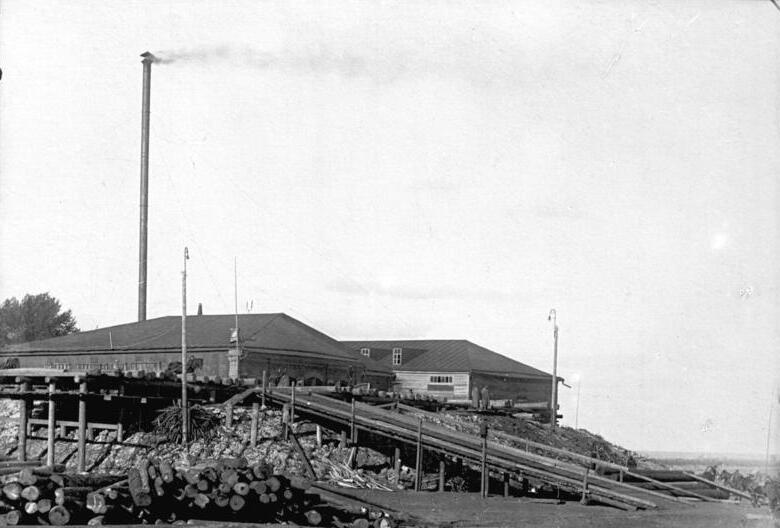
A sawmill in Pokrovsk, the capital of the Volga German ASSR, 1928

Ethnic Germans in the Soviet Union of the 1920s enjoyed a certain degree of cultural autonomy, there were 8 national districts in Ukraine as well as a number in Russia proper and one each in Georgia and Azerbaijan and Volga German Autonomous Soviet Socialist Republic (Volga German ASSR), schools and newspapers, in compliance with the policy of national delimitation in the Soviet Union.

In September 1929, discontented with the reintroduction of coercive grain requisitions and collectivization of agriculture, several thousand Soviet peasants of German descent (mostly Mennonites) convened in Moscow, demanding exit visas to emigrate to Canada, provoking a significant political scandal in Germany, which soured German–Soviet relations. The charity "Brothers in Need" was established in Germany to raise money for the Soviet Germans, President Paul von Hindenburg himself donated 200,000 ℛ︁ℳ︁ of his own money for that purpose. The Soviet government first permitted 5,461 Germans to emigrate, but then deported the remaining 9,730 back to their original places of residence. However, throughout 1930, efforts were still being made by the Soviet government to increase the number and quality of German national institutions in the Soviet Union.

The first mass arrests and show trials specifically targeting Soviet Germans (those who were considered counter-revolutionaries) occurred in the Soviet Union during the 1933 Ukrainian terror. However, with the Central Committee of the All-Union Communist Party (b)'s decree of November 5, 1934, the domestic anti-German campaign assumed all-union dimensions.

In 1933–1934, a campaign was launched in Germany to help Soviet Volksdeutsche during the famine by sending food packets and money.

Deeply concerned over cross-border ethnic ties of national minorities (such as Germans, Poles, Finns), in 1934 the Soviet Union decided to create a new border security zone along its western border, and in 1935–1937 potentially disloyal nationalities (including German) were mostly (albeit not completely) deported from this strip of land to the inner parts of the Soviet Union by NKVD. German national institutions were gradually abolished.

In 1937–1938 NKVD conducted mass operations "for the destruction of espionage and sabotage contingents" (known as National operations of NKVD) among diaspora nationalities against both Soviet and foreign citizens (resulting in arrest and usually execution), including an NKVD campaign against Germans, in fact indiscriminately targeting national minorities during the Great Terror. Concurrently all German and other diaspora national districts and schools in the Soviet Union except the Volga German ASSR and German schools within that republic were abolished.

The Soviet government had made a prior decision to evacuate the entire population of German origin in case of German invasion, which was immediately implemented after the actual invasion by forcibly transferring 1.2 million citizens of German origin from European Russia to Siberia and Soviet Central Asia.

== Aftermath ==
=== Hitler breaks the Pact ===
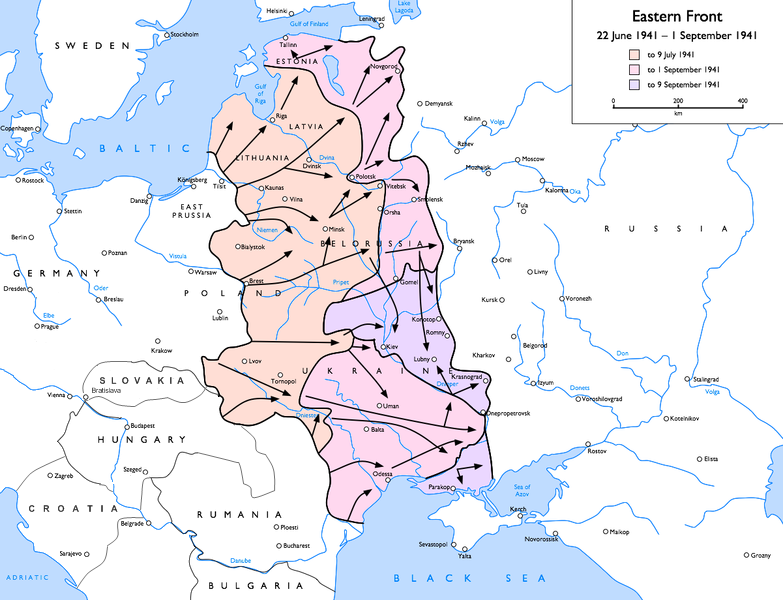
German advances during Operation Barbarossa, 1941-06-22 to 1941-09-09

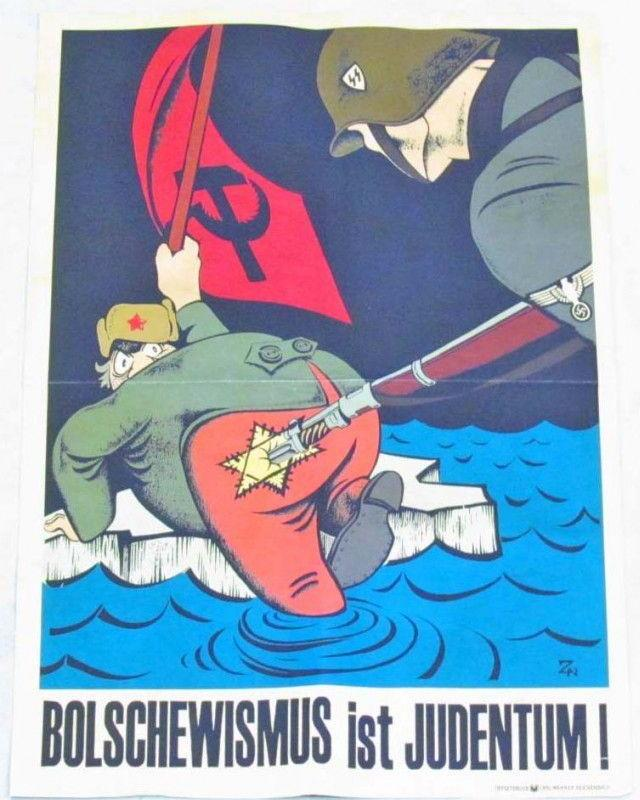
Anti-Soviet, antisemitic propaganda poster in Nazi Germany

Nazi Germany terminated the Molotov–Ribbentrop Pact with its invasion of the Soviet Union in Operation Barbarossa on June 22, 1941. After the launch of the invasion, the territories that had been gained by the Soviet Union as a result of the Molotov–Ribbentrop Pact were lost in a matter of weeks. In the three weeks following the breaking of the Pact, the Soviet Union attempted to defend itself against vast German advances; in the process, the Soviet Union suffered 750,000 casualties, and lost 10,000 tanks and 4,000 aircraft. Within six months, the Soviet military had suffered 4.3 million casualties and the Germans had captured three million Soviet prisoners, two million of which would die in German captivity by February 1942. German forces had advanced 1,050 miles (1,690 kilometers), and maintained a linearly-measured front of 1,900 miles (3,058 kilometers).

=== Denial of the Secret Protocol's existence by the Soviet Union ===
German officials found a microfilmed copy of the secret protocols of the Molotov–Ribbentrop Pact in 1945 and provided it to the United States Armed Forces. Despite publication of the recovered copy in western media, for decades it was the official policy of the Soviet Union to deny the existence of the secret protocol.

After the Baltic Way demonstrations of August 23, 1989, a Soviet commission concluded in December 1989 that the protocol had existed. In 1992, only after the dissolution of the Soviet Union, the document itself was declassified.

=== Post-war commentary regarding the timing of rapprochement ===
After the war, historians have argued about the start of German–Soviet rapprochement. There are many conflicting points of view in historiography as to when the Soviet side began to seek rapprochement and when the secret political negotiations started.

Some scholars argue that for a long time the collective security doctrine was a sincere and unanimous position of the Soviet leadership, pursuing a purely defensive line, whereas others contend that from the very beginning the Soviet Union intended to cooperate with Nazi Germany, collective security being merely tactical counter to some unfriendly German moves. However, perhaps Moscow sought to avoid a great war in Europe because it was not strong enough to fight an offensive war; but there was much disagreement over the policy between Litvinov and Molotov about how to attain that goal, and Stalin alternated between their positions, initially pursuing both contradictory lines simultaneously quite early and abandoning collective security only at some point in 1939.

Nazi Germany started its quest for a pact with the Soviet Union at some point in the spring of 1939 in order to prevent an English–Soviet–French alliance and to secure Soviet neutrality in a future Polish–German war.

Some argue that the rapprochement could start as early as in 1935–1936, when Soviet trade representative in Berlin David Kandelaki made attempts at political negotiations on behalf of Stalin and Molotov, behind Litvinov's back. Molotov's speech to the Central Executive Committee of the Supreme Soviet in January 1936 is usually taken to mark this change of policy. Thus, Litvinov's anti-German line did not enjoy unanimous support by the Soviet leadership long before his dismissal. Walter Krivitsky, an NKVD agent, who defected in the Netherlands in 1937, reported in his memoires in 1938 that already then Stalin had sought better relations with Germany. According to other historians, these were merely responses to German overtures for détente.

It is also possible that the change of foreign policy occurred in 1938, after the Munich Agreement, which became the final defeat of Litvinov's anti-German policy of collective security, which was marked by the reported remark about an inevitable fourth partition of Poland made by Litvinov's deputy Vladimir Potemkin in a conversation with French ambassador Robert Coulondre shortly thereafter.

The turn towards Germany could also have been made in early 1939, marked by Stalin's speech to the 18th Congress of the Communist Party of the Soviet Union in March 1939, shortly after the German occupation of Czechoslovakia, when he warned that the Western democracies were trying to provoke a conflict between Germany and the Soviet Union and declared the Soviet Union's non-involvement in inter-capitalist quarrels, which is sometimes considered to have been a signal to Berlin.

According to others, the first sign of a German–Soviet political détente was the conversation between Soviet ambassador Aleksey Merekalov and Ernst von Weizsäcker, State Secretary in the German Foreign Ministry, on April 17, 1939, when the former hinted at possible improvement of the relations. This was followed by a series of perceived German signals of goodwill and the replacement of Litvinov with Molotov. According to Geoffrey Roberts, recently released documents from the Soviet diplomatic files show that western historians have been mistaken in assuming that the Merekalov–Weiszäcker meeting of April 1939 was the occasion for Soviet signals of a desire for détente with Nazi Germany. His point of view, supported by Derek Watson and Jonathan Haslam, is that it was not until the end of July 1939 – August 1939 that the policy change occurred and that it was a consequence rather than a cause of the breakdown of the Anglo–Soviet–French triple alliance negotiations. It must have been clear to Molotov and Stalin in August 1939, that an agreement with Germany avoided an immediate war with that country and could satisfy Soviet territorial ambitions in eastern Poland, Estonia, Latvia, Lithuania, Finland, and Bessarabia; whereas an alliance with Britain and France offered no territorial gains and risked a war with Germany in which the USSR was most likely to bear the brunt of a German attack.

== Soviet ambassadors (chargés) to Berlin ==
- Adolf Ioffe (1918)
- Nikolay Krestinsky (1921–1930)
- Lev Khinchuk (1930–1934)
- Yakov Surits (1934–1937)
- Konstantin Yurenev (1937)
- Alexey Merekalov (1938–1939)
- Georgy Astakhov (1939)
- Alexander Shkvartsev (1939–1940)
- Vladimir Dekanozov (1940–1941)

== German ambassadors to Moscow ==
- Wilhelm Mirbach (1918)
- Karl Helfferich
- Kurt Wiedenfeld
- Ulrich Graf von Brockdorff-Rantzau (1922–1928)
- Herbert von Dirksen (1928–1933)
- Rudolf Nadolny (1933–1934)
- Friedrich Werner von der Schulenburg (1934–1941)

== See also ==
- Foreign relations of the Soviet Union
- Germany–Russia relations
- International relations (1919–1939)
- Timeline of the Molotov–Ribbentrop Pact
- Treaty of Berlin (August 27, 1918)
