= London negotiations (1939) =

London negotiations is the term used in Soviet historiography for talks between representatives of the United Kingdom and Nazi Germany held between June and August 1939. They took place alongside the Moscow negotiations between the Soviet Union, Britain and France. The contacts included the July meetings of Helmuth Wohlthat with Horace Wilson and Robert Hudson.

The talks explored a comprehensive Anglo-German agreement on political, military and economic questions. Press reports of a possible British loan to Germany provoked controversy, and Neville Chamberlain denied that the government had proposed such a loan. The authority of the participants and the significance of their proposals have been disputed by historians. The official Soviet account attributed the failure of the Moscow negotiations and the subsequent conclusion of the German–Soviet non-aggression pact to the Anglo-German contacts.

== Negotiations ==
=== Background ===
At a cabinet meeting on 3 May 1939, Chamberlain expressed a wish to resume Anglo-German economic negotiations, which had been interrupted by the German occupation of Czechoslovakia.

=== Wohlthat's visit ===
Wohlthat, an official in Hermann Göring's Four Year Plan organisation, visited London as the German representative to an international whaling conference. He met Wilson on 18 July and Hudson on 20 July. The historian Helmut Metzmacher questions whether a reported second meeting with Wilson on 21 July took place. The German ambassador, Herbert von Dirksen, supported Wohlthat's contacts.

=== Proposals ===
In his memoirs, Ivan Maisky described Wohlthat's attendance at the whaling conference as the ostensible reason for a visit during which he met Hudson and Wilson. Maisky drew on Dirksen's account of the discussions. According to Dirksen's report of 21 July:

- Hudson invited Wohlthat to meet him and outlined plans for Anglo-German cooperation in world markets, with a division between British and German spheres of interest.
- Wohlthat also met Wilson at Wilson's invitation. In two conversations, Wilson outlined the aim of reaching "the broadest possible Anglo-German agreement". This would include an Anglo-German non-aggression pact, a pact on non-interference and the division of spheres of influence, an arms limitation treaty, and agreements on German participation in the exploitation of colonies and on mutual financial assistance. When Wohlthat asked whether other questions could be added to the agenda, Wilson replied: "The Führer need only take a sheet of paper and list the questions that interest him; the British government would be prepared to discuss them." Wilson also requested the appointment of a representative with full powers to negotiate Anglo-German cooperation. According to Dirksen, "Sir Horace Wilson explicitly told Mr Wohlthat that the conclusion of a non-aggression pact [with Germany] would enable Britain to free itself from its commitment to Poland." Wilson offered to arrange a meeting with Chamberlain so that Wohlthat could satisfy himself that Chamberlain supported Wilson's programme, but Wohlthat declined.

The economic proposals, as described by Alice Teichova, envisaged cooperation in obtaining raw materials and food, exporting industrial goods and investing capital abroad. The Soviet Union, China and European colonial territories were treated as potential areas for investment and markets for British, German and American heavy industry. A European trust for the development and exploitation of Africa was also proposed.

=== Buxton–Kordt conversation ===
On 29 July 1939, the former Labour MP Charles Roden Buxton met privately with Theodor Kordt, a counsellor at the German embassy in London. Buxton outlined a plan for an Anglo-German agreement, while stating that he spoke neither for the Labour Party nor for the British government.

According to Kordt's memorandum, Buxton proposed that Britain recognise German spheres of interest in Eastern and Southeastern Europe in exchange for German non-interference in the British Empire. Britain would withdraw its guarantees to states within the German sphere, end its negotiations with the Soviet Union, and encourage France to abandon its Soviet alliance and its ties in Southeastern Europe. In return, Germany would commit to European cooperation, some future autonomy for Bohemia and Moravia, and a general reduction of armaments.

Kordt thought that Buxton's proposals reflected ideas held by Wilson and Chamberlain, although Buxton was evasive when asked if he had discussed them with government ministers. Metzmacher questioned whether Buxton had acted on behalf of the government or obtained his plan from Wilson.

=== August contacts ===
According to Vilnis Sipols, Wilson outlined the British proposals to the German ambassador in London on 3 August. The programme envisaged:

1. An Anglo-German agreement renouncing the use of force.
2. A declaration that Germany would not interfere in the affairs of the British Empire and that Britain would not interfere in those of "Greater Germany".
3. Revision of the provisions of the Treaty of Versailles concerning colonies and mandated territories.

== Press reaction ==
Reports of the discussions appeared in the British press on 22 July. They included claims of a proposed £1 billion loan to Germany and provoked an international controversy. Herbert Reginbogin also attributed the communication of a loan offer to Ernest Tennant, a founder of the Anglo-German Fellowship, who conveyed it to Joachim von Ribbentrop. In France, L'Intransigeant, La Journée industrielle and the Radical-Socialist La République defended the discussions and argued that the proposals had some merit.

=== Chamberlain's explanation ===
In the House of Commons on 24 July, Chamberlain denied that the government had proposed a loan to Germany. He described Hudson's discussion with Wohlthat as a personal conversation, said that the Cabinet had known nothing of it, and stated that the government did not intend to initiate negotiations of that kind. He acknowledged that Wilson had also seen Wohlthat, but said that Wilson had not discussed the matters raised by Hudson.

According to Scott Newton, when reports of the talks leaked to the press, Chamberlain was evasive about Wilson's discussions and stated that Hudson had acted on his own initiative.

== Soviet and German reactions ==
On 22 July, the Soviet press reported the resumption of German–Soviet negotiations on trade and credit. Bernd Martin argued that the disclosures about the London talks alarmed the Soviet leadership and encouraged it to seek an agreement with Germany to avoid encirclement. Lothar Kettenacker interpreted the Wohlthat–Hudson contacts as reinforcing Soviet suspicions that capitalist interests in London and Berlin were cooperating to prepare another Munich agreement.

According to Lev Bezymensky, Soviet military intelligence recorded a statement on 7 August by Alfred Gerstenberg, the German air attaché in Poland. Gerstenberg reportedly said that Hitler had decided on war with Poland that year and that Wohlthat's visit had convinced him that Britain would remain neutral.

== Historical interpretations ==
=== Soviet interpretations ===
According to Soviet historians, the British proposals envisaged a division of spheres of influence with Germany. They would recognise German interests in Eastern and Southeastern Europe and British rights in its colonies, while placing the Soviet Union and China within a joint sphere of Anglo-German "cooperation". These accounts also described discussions about revising the Treaty of Versailles of 1919 to allow Germany to participate in the exploitation of an "African colonial zone".

In this account, Britain also proposed a non-aggression pact that would entail withdrawing its existing guarantees, including those given to Poland. Soviet diplomats viewed the London negotiations as an attempt to redirect German aggression towards the Soviet Union and the countries of Eastern Europe. In the Soviet interpretation, the talks failed because of the deep differences between Germany and Britain.

Maisky recalled that, in the summer of 1939, Soviet diplomats "did not yet know the details of the secret negotiations between Britain and Hitler's Germany". The Soviet authorities subsequently captured Dirksen's private archive during the war and published documents from it in support of their interpretation of the pre-war talks.

=== Western interpretations ===
Historians have differed over the significance of the British proposals. Alastair Parker regarded them as serious. Donald Watt, by contrast, considered this episode the most susceptible to misinterpretation of all those immediately preceding the war. He argued that the proposals, if any had been made, were unauthorised. Watt interpreted Dirksen's records as expressing Dirksen's own position rather than Wilson's. Scott Newton noted that Wilson's own record of a later conversation with Dirksen indicated that Adolf Hitler had shown considerable interest in Wohlthat's report.

Helmut Metzmacher interpreted the British approach as a continuation of Chamberlain's appeasement policy. He regarded Wilson as acting with Chamberlain's backing and argued that Wohlthat acted on his own initiative. Alfred Kube disputed the suggestion that Wohlthat had acted independently of Göring, pointing to Göring's discussion of a similar programme with Axel Wenner-Gren on 25 May 1939. Dietrich Eichholtz criticised Metzmacher's treatment as an uncritical defence of the talks and of Wohlthat.

Metzmacher also endorsed Teichova's suggestion that the British participants had placed only abbreviated or altered records in the official files. Teichova interpreted the economic proposals as an attempt to defend Britain's position against German and American competition by creating a military and economic bloc that could reach an accommodation with the United States and serve as a barrier to communism.

Reginbogin regarded the proposals as an almost megalomaniacal scheme to divide world markets between Britain, Germany and the United States. He saw them as a continuation of earlier initiatives, including the Anglo-German Payments Agreement and the Düsseldorf Agreement. Bernd-Jürgen Wendt rejected the portrayal of the talks as a mysterious conspiracy that had emerged from the contemporary polemics in Britain and Germany.

Rainer F. Schmidt interpreted the talks as a British form of non-aggression agreement with Germany, intended to preserve peace and resolve disputes. He distinguished this from an expansionist arrangement based on subjugation and exploitation, and argued that the talks failed because Hitler sought acceptance of a war of conquest in Eastern Europe.

In his memoirs, published in 1972, Gladwyn Jebb criticised the contacts as an example of excessive appeasement. He argued that they had made the Soviet government suspicious, discouraged Poland and led Germany to believe that Britain was willing to buy peace.

== Sources ==
- Adamthwaite, Anthony (1977). France and the Coming of the Second World War, 1936–1939. London: Frank Cass.
- Adamthwaite, Anthony (1990). "Großbritannien und das Herannahen des Krieges" [Britain and the Approach of War]. In Hildebrand, Klaus; Schmädeke, Jürgen; Zernack, Klaus (eds.). 1939 – An der Schwelle zum Weltkrieg: Die Entfesselung des Zweiten Weltkrieges und das internationale System [1939 – On the Threshold of World War: The Unleashing of the Second World War and the International System] (in German). Berlin and New York.
- Besymenski, Lew (2002). Stalin und Hitler: Das Pokerspiel der Diktatoren [Stalin and Hitler: The Dictators' Poker Game] (in German). Berlin: Aufbau Verlag.
- Documents and Materials Relating to the Eve of the Second World War. Vol. II: Dirksen Papers (1938–1939). Moscow: Foreign Languages Publishing House. 1948.
- Eichholtz, Dietrich (1999) [1969]. Geschichte der deutschen Kriegswirtschaft 1939–1945 [History of the German War Economy, 1939–1945] (PDF) (in German). Vol. 1: 1939–1941 (3 ed.). Munich: K. G. Saur.
- "Herr Wohltat's Visit (Conversations)". Hansard. UK Parliament. 24 July 1939. HC Deb, vol. 350, cols. 1025–1028.
- Hofer, Walther (1964). Die Diktatur Hitlers [Hitler's Dictatorship] (in German). Konstanz.
- Hofer, Walther; Reginbogin, Herbert R. (2001). Hitler, der Westen und die Schweiz: 1936–1945 [Hitler, the West and Switzerland: 1936–1945] (in German). Zürich: Verlag Neue Zürcher Zeitung.
- Kettenacker, Lothar (1979). "Die Diplomatie der Ohnmacht: Die gescheiterte Friedensstrategie der britischen Regierung vor Ausbruch des Zweiten Weltkrieges" [The Diplomacy of Powerlessness: The British Government's Failed Peace Strategy Before the Outbreak of the Second World War]. In Benz, Wolfgang; Graml, Hermann (eds.). Sommer 1939: Die Großmächte und der Europäische Krieg [Summer 1939: The Great Powers and the European War] (in German). Stuttgart.
- Kube, Alfred (1986). Pour le Mérite und Hakenkreuz: Hermann Göring im Dritten Reich [Pour le Mérite and the Swastika: Hermann Göring in the Third Reich] (in German). Munich.
- Maisky, I. M. (1987). Воспоминания советского дипломата (1925–1945 годы) [Memoirs of a Soviet Diplomat (1925–1945)] (in Russian). Mezhdunarodnye otnosheniya.
- Martin, Bernd (1989). Weltmacht oder Niedergang? [World Power or Decline?] (in German). Darmstadt.
- Metzmacher, Helmut (1966). "Deutsch-englische Ausgleichsbemühungen im Sommer 1939" [Anglo-German Efforts to Reach an Accommodation in the Summer of 1939] (PDF). Vierteljahrshefte für Zeitgeschichte (in German). 14 (4): 369–412.
- Newton, Scott (1996). Profits of Peace: The Political Economy of Anglo-German Appeasement. Oxford University Press.
- Schmidt, Rainer F. (2002). Die Aussenpolitik des Dritten Reiches [The Foreign Policy of the Third Reich] (in German). Stuttgart.
- Sipols, V. Ya. (1979). Дипломатическая борьба накануне второй мировой войны [Diplomatic Struggle on the Eve of the Second World War] (in Russian). Moscow: Mezhdunarodnye otnosheniya.
- Teichova, Alice (1959). "Die geheimen britisch-deutschen Ausgleichsversuche am Vorabend des zweiten Weltkrieges" [Secret British–German Attempts to Reach an Accommodation on the Eve of the Second World War]. Zeitschrift für Geschichtswissenschaft (in German) (4).
- Wendt, Bernd-Jürgen (1971). Economic Appeasement (in German). Düsseldorf.
