= Sterławki Wielkie =

- Village
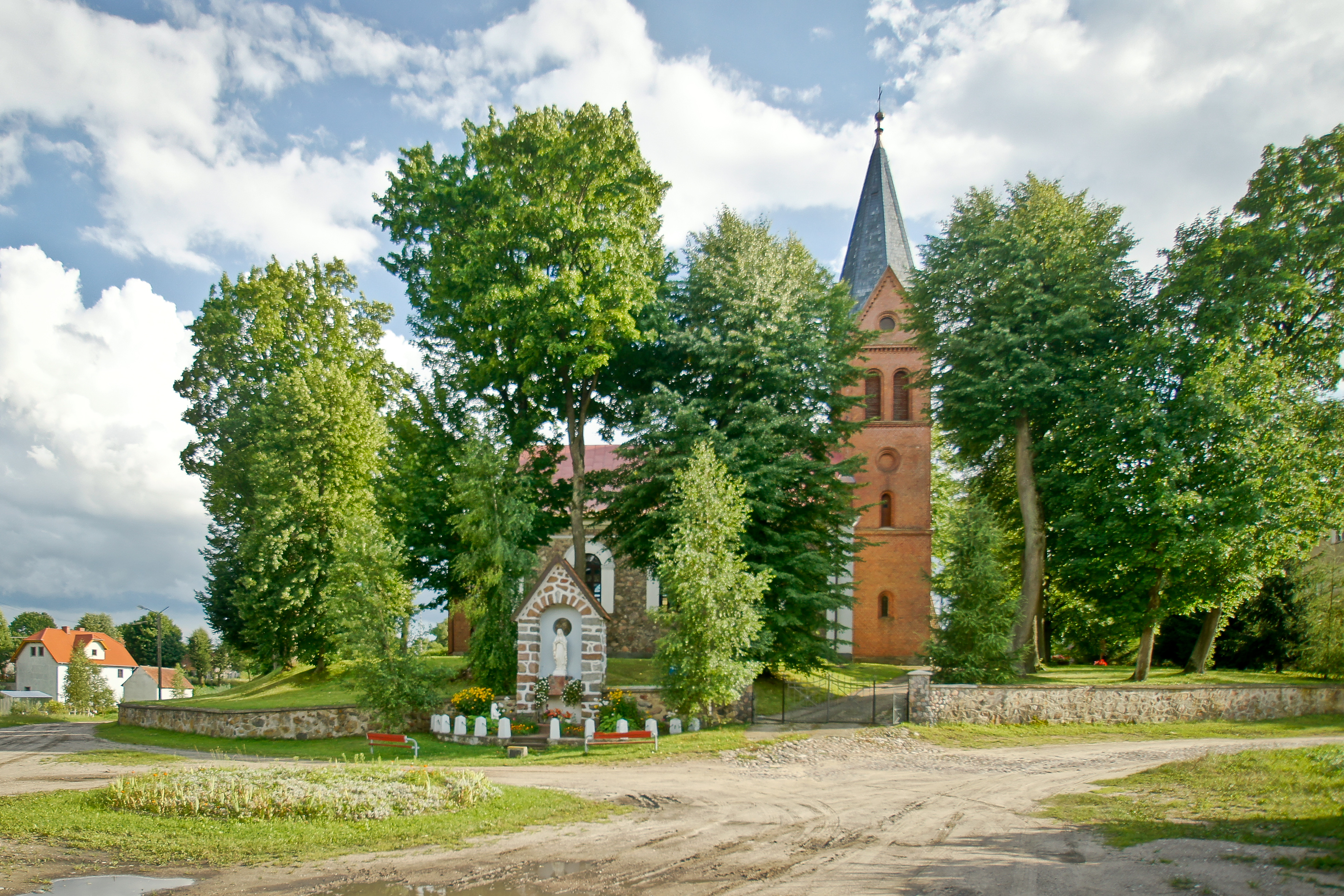
- The Church of Divine Providence (1832)

- Location within Poland
- Coordinates: 54°1′N 21°35′E
- Country: Poland
- Voivodeship: Warmian-Masurian
- County: Giżycko
- Gmina: Ryn

Sterławki Wielkie [stɛrˈwafki ˈvjɛlkʲɛ] is a village in the administrative district of Gmina Ryn, within Giżycko County, Warmian-Masurian Voivodeship, in northeastern Poland.

== History ==
Groß Stürlack was founded in 1387 by the Teutonic Knights (German Order). The town was burned down during an invasion of East Prussia by the Crimean Tatars in 1656, but was recovered by the Germans in 1661.

By 1811 Groß Stürlack was a village numbering 48 houses with a population of 411. In 1874 it became a German administrative town (Amtsdorf) belonging to the district of Lötzen (now Giżycko, Poland), which it remained until the border changes of 1945.

In 1910, four years before the outbreak of World War I, Groß Stürlack was home to 877 residents. After the war, on July 11, 1920, the East Prussian plebiscite, mandated by the Versailles Treaty, was held in the District of Allenstein (now Olzstyn). District-wide results were 1,480 votes for Germany and 1 (one) vote for Poland. In Groß Stürlack, 700 votes were cast for remaining in Germany, none for joining Poland.

Eight years later, the neighboring village of Adlig Stürlack (Polish: Sterławki Szlacheckie) was annexed to Groß Stürlack, and by 1933 the town's population had risen to 941.

After World War II, southern East Prussia was assigned to Poland under border changes promulgated at the Potsdam Conference in July–August 1945. The name Groß Stürlack was rendered in Polish as Sterławki Wielkie, remaining German residents were expelled, and Polish settlers eventually replaced them. Sterławki Wielkie has been part of the Polish Warmian-Masurian Voivodeship since 1988.

== Notable residents ==
- Rudolf Nadolny (1873-1953), German diplomat
- Heinz-Günter Wittmann (1927–1990), German biochemist
