= Rudolf Nadolny =

German diplomat and military officer

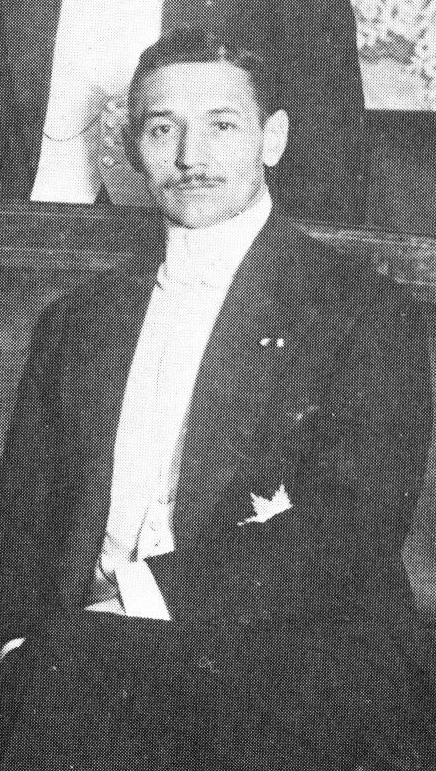
- Nadolny in 1917

German ambassador to the Soviet Union
- In office October 1933 – 16 June 1934
- Chancellor: Adolf Hitler
- Preceded by: Herbert von Dirksen
- Succeeded by: Friedrich-Werner Graf von der Schulenburg

German ambassador to Turkey
- In office May 1924 – October 1933
- President: Friedrich Ebert; Paul von Hindenburg
- Preceded by: Johann Heinrich von Bernstorff (1918)
- Succeeded by: Hans von Rosenberg

Personal details
- Born: 12 July 1873 Groß Stürlack, East Prussia, Germany (now Sterławki Wielkie, Poland)
- Died: 18 May 1953 (aged 79) Düsseldorf-Benrath, West Germany
- Children: Burkard Nadolny
- Occupation: Diplomat

Rudolf Nadolny (12 July 1873 – 18 May 1953) was a military intelligence officer under German Foreign Office cover. During the First World War, he worked in a branch of the German General Staff that experimented in biological warfare. He was the German Ambassador to Turkey (1924-1933) and the Soviet Union (1933-1934) and the head of the German delegation at the World Disarmament Conference (1932-1933). He sought to pursue close relations between the Weimar Republic and the Soviet Union. Nadolny left the diplomatic service in opposition to Hitler's policy towards the Soviets.

== Early life and career ==
Nadolny was born in Groß Stürlack, East Prussia (now Sterławki Wielkie, Poland) to Heinrich (1847–1944) and Agnes Nadolny, née Trinker (1847–1910). His father's family had been landowners in East Prussia since the 14th century. His mother's ancestors were Protestant exiles from Salzburg.

Nadolny passed his Abitur at the gymnasium (school) of Rastenburg in 1892 and studied law at the University of Königsberg. Nadolny joined the German diplomatic service in 1902 and was deployed in St. Petersburg in 1903 to 1907 in which he witnessed the Russian Revolution of 1905 and the Russo-Japanese War. Nadolny was then sent to Persia, Bosnia and Albania.

== First World War ==
During the First World War, Nadolny led a political section of the German General Staff, the so-called Sektion Politik Berlin des Generalstabs. The group was responsible for acts of sabotage by using explosives and biological warfare. In 1915, Nadolny shipped cultures of anthrax and glanders, a horse disease that is also deadly to humans, to the German embassy in Romania to use them to target animals traded with the Russian Empire. The operation lasted until August 1916. Bacteria used by Nadolny were prepared in Berlin, and from there, Nadolny sent out the biological agents to Spain, the United States, Argentina and Romania It was Nadolny who sent the infamous Anton Dilger to the still-neutral United States, where Dilger engaged in one of the first acts of state sponsored bioterrorism in the 20th century,

In July 1916, he became the German chargé d'affaires in Persia but returned to Germany in November 1917 to serve as the acting head of the Eastern Department of the German Foreign Office. As such, Nadolny took part in the negotiations that led to the Treaty of Brest-Litovsk.

== Interwar era ==
After the end of the First World War, Nadolny was the Foreign Office's representative in the Office of the German President. From January 1920, he led the German legation in Stockholm and became the German ambassador to Turkey in May 1924. During the interwar era, Nadolny wrote that out of mixing of German and "Slavic" blood, a new species and race would be born, an "East-Elbian" race, and he attacked the Czechoslovak national leader Jan Masaryk for criticising the "Prussian Spirit". Nadolny claimed claiming that Czechs were only relatives of Prussians.

In November 1928, after the death of Ulrich von Brockdorff-Rantzau, the German ambassador in Moscow, Nadolny applied for this post, but his efforts were vetoed by Gustav Stresemann, who appointed Herbert von Dirksen instead. From February 1932 to October 1933, Nadolny was the head of the German delegation at the World Disarmament Conference in Geneva. In the spring of 1932, when General Kurt von Schleicher brought down the government of Heinrich Brüning and had his friend Franz von Papen appointed chancellor, Nadolny was of the three men to be interviewed by Scheicher as a possible foreign minister for the Papen government. The other two men interviewed to be Foreign Minister were Baron Leopold von Hoesch, the German ambassador to France, and Baron Konstantin von Neurath, the German ambassador to the United Kingdom. Ultimately, Neurath was chosen by Schleicher to be the foreign minister in the "Cabinet of the President's Friends", as the Papen government was known, and he never forgot that Nadolny was disappointed that he did not get the portfolio that he had greatly wanted. Neurath stayed on as Foreign Minister and served in the Papen, Schleicher and Hitler governments until 4 February 1938, he was sacked by Hitler. Nadolny became the German ambassador to the Soviet Union in October 1933. Neurath, who saw Nadolny as a rival, and knew of Hitler's anti-Soviet inclinations and Nadolny's advocacy of better relations with the Soviet Union, gave him the Moscow appointment to ruin his career. Nadolny's attempts to enhance German–Soviet relations on the basis of the Treaty of Rapallo (1922) were largely unsuccessful as it contradicted Hitler's policy. Nadolny believed in 1933 that it was feasible for Nazi Germany to annex Polish territories in Pomerania in exchange for promising Lithuanian Memel to the Poles

Nadolny argued against the 1934 German–Polish Non-Aggression Pact because of its influence on German–Soviet relations and urged "decent treatment" of Soviet ambassador Maxim Litvinov "even if he is Jewish". In a conference with Hitler, Nadolny pointed out that in his view close ties with the Soviets were of essential interest, but Hitler rejected any compromise with Bolshevism. However, even Nadolny admitted that a totally-friendly relationship with Russia was impossible. The meeting, which was described as a "stormy one", ended with Hitler declaring the conversation finished; Nadolny answered that "the conversation had just begun".

On another occasion, he addressed Hitler as "Herr Reichskanzler", as opposed to the common "Mein Führer", and he refused to use the Nazi salute. Nadolny resigned on 16 June 1934 and worked as an administrator of an estate.

== Second World War ==
During the Second World War, he served as a captain and later major at the High Command of the Wehrmacht and on the staff of Admiral Wilhelm Canaris.

== Postwar ==
In 1945 Nadolny, who had no compromising Nazi Party affiliation, became the president of the German Red Cross and was active in the Society for German reunification and the "German Unity Association. With the growing tensions between the Western Allies and the Soviets, Nadolny was sometimes seen as a Soviet agent and was generally mistrusted.

During the Blockade of Berlin in 1948 to 1949, Nadolny moved to West Germany. He died in 1953 in Düsseldorf.

== Family ==
Nadolny married Änny Matthiessen (1882–1977) in 1905. Burkard Nadolny (1905–68) was their son and Sten Nadolny their grandson.

Diplomatic posts
Preceded by Johann Heinrich von Bernstorff (- 1918)	German Ambassador to Turkey; 1924–1933	Succeeded by Frederic von Rosenberg
Preceded by Herbert von Dirksen	German Ambassador to the Soviet Union; 1933–1934	Succeeded by Friedrich Werner von der Schulenburg
