= Treaty of Berlin (1926) =

Agreement between Germany and the Soviet Union

The Treaty of Berlin (German–Soviet Neutrality and Nonaggression Pact) was a treaty signed on 24 April 1926 under which Germany and the Soviet Union pledged neutrality in the event of an attack on the other by a third party for five years. The treaty reaffirmed the German–Soviet Treaty of Rapallo (1922).

Ratifications for the treaty were exchanged in Berlin on 29 June 1926, and it went into effect on the same day. The treaty was registered in League of Nations Treaty Series on 3 August 1926. It was renewed by additional protocol signed on 24 June 1931, ratified on 5 May 1933. The additional protocol was registered in League of Nations Treaty Series on 15 February 1935.

== Reactions ==
In Germany, the treaty was compared with Bismarck's famous Reinsurance Treaty with Russia in 1887. The votes to endorse the treaty in the Foreign Committee of the Reichstag had been unanimous, a first for the Weimar Republic.

1. German Chancellor Wilhelm Marx: "intent to adapt German-Russian relationship established at Rapallo to new political situation created by the Locarno treaties".
2. Weimar Republic Foreign Minister Gustav Stresemann: "the idea of combining this Locarno policy with a consolidation of our relations with Russia".
3. Soviet Diplomat Maxim Litvinov: "amplification of the Rapallo Treaty".

== Text ==
The German Government and the Government of the Union of Socialist Soviet Republics,

Being desirous of doing all in their power to promote the maintenance of general peace,

Being convinced that the interests of the German people and the peoples of the Government of the Union of Socialist Soviet Republics demand constant and trustful co- operation,

Having agreed to strengthen the friendly relations existing between them by means of a special Treaty have agreed upon the following provisions:

Article 1
The relations between Germany and the Government of the Union of Socialist Soviet Republics shall continue to be based on the Treaty of Rapallo.

The German Government and the Government of the Union of Socialist Soviet Republics will maintain friendly contact in order to promote an understanding with regard to all political and economic questions jointly affecting their two countries.

Article 2
Should one of the Contracting Parties, despite its peaceful attitude, be attacked by one or more third Powers, the other Contracting Party shall observe neutrality for the whole of the duration of the conflict.
Article 3
If on the occasion of a conflict of the nature mentioned in Article 2, or at a time when neither of the Contracting Parties is engaged in warlike operations, a coalition is formed between third Powers with a view to the economic or financial boycott of either of the Contracting Parties, the other Contracting Party undertakes not to adhere to such coalition.
Article 4
The present Treaty shall be ratified and the instruments of ratification shall be exchanged at Berlin.
It shall enter into force on the date of the exchange of the instruments of ratification and shall remain in force for five years. The two Contracting Parties shall confer in good time before the expiration of this period with regard to the future development of their political relations.
In faith whereof the plenipotentiaries have signed the present Treaty.

Signed: Herr Stresemann
Signed: M Krestinski

== Aftermath ==
In June 1926, German banks granted the Soviets credits to the total amount of 300 million marks "thanks to the cooperation of the German Government". Interest was fixed at 9.4% per annum. In October 1926, the Soviet government invited a notable group of Reichstag deputies to Moscow. Georgy Chicherin, visited Berlin at December 1926 and remarked on the improvement of the present German-Soviet relations compared to 1925.

From then on, however, there was a slow decline in relations, with a complete breakdown reached a few months after Hitler's 1933 rise to power.Prolongations of the Treaty were signed on 24 June 1931, and in the same year, German banks granted the Soviet Union 300 million marks′ worth of additional credits for purchasing German industrial goods.

== See also ==
- Germany–Soviet Union relations, 1918–1941

== Sources ==
=== Articles ===
- Crozier, Andrew J. (1997). "The Failed Peace". The causes of the Second World War. Blackwell Publishers. p. 67. ISBN 978-0-631-18601-4.
- Tucker, Robert C. (1992). "The Diplomacy of Rapprochement with Germany". Stalin in power: the revolution from above, 1928–1941 (reprint ed.). W.W. Norton & Company. p. 227. ISBN 978-0-393-30869-3.
- Moss, Walter (2005). "Soviet Foreign Policy, 1917–1941". A history of Russia. Vol. 2 (2nd ed.). Anthem Press. p. 284. ISBN 978-1-84331-034-1.

=== Books ===
- Akten zur deutschen auswärtigen Politik 1918–1945. Serie B, 1925–1933
- Документы внешней политики СССР. Том 9. 1 января – 31 декабря 1926 г. – М.: Политиздат, 1965
