= Heinz-Günter Wittmann =

German biochemist

- Born: 16 January 1927; Groß Stürlack, East Prussia, Weimar Germany, today Sterławki Wielkie, Poland
- Died: 31 March 1990 (aged 63); Berlin, Germany
- Citizenship: German
- Known for: Biochemistry
- Awards: Sir Hans Krebs Medal (1975)
- Scientific career
- Fields: Biochemistry
- Workplaces: Max Planck Institute for Biochemistry Max Planck Institute for Molecular Genetics
- Doctoral advisor: Georg Melchers

Heinz-Günter Wittmann (16 January 1927 – 31 March 1990) was a German biochemist known for his research in ribosomes.
