= Anton Dilger =

German-American medical doctor

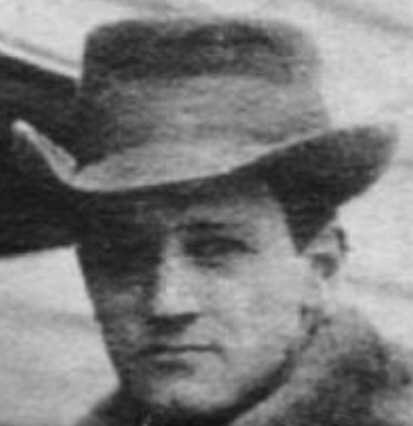
- Dilger, before 1918
- Born: 13 February 1884; Front Royal, Virginia, United States
- Died: 17 October 1918 (aged 34); Madrid, Spain
- Education: University of Heidelberg
- Scientific career
- Fields: Biology

Anton Casimir Dilger (13 February 1884 – 17 October 1918) was a German-American medical doctor and a main actor in the German biological warfare sabotage program during World War I. Dilger eventually fled to Madrid, Spain, where he died during the 1918 flu pandemic.

== Early life and career ==
Dilger was born in Front Royal, Virginia, to which his parents had moved from Ohio in the decades after the American Civil War. He was educated in Germany after he had gone there at the age of nine. He attended Gymnasium in Bensheim and trained as a physician in Heidelberg and Munich. He later worked for the University of Heidelberg surgical clinic while he researched his doctoral dissertation. His dissertation involved growing animal cells in tissue culture at which he was unsuccessful. He received his doctorate summa cum laude in 1912.

Anton Dilger was the son of Captain Hubert Dilger, a decorated artillerist in the Union Army during the American Civil War, awarded the Medal of Honor for his exploits during the Battle of Chancellorsville (1863). His grandfather was anatomist Friedrich Tiedemann (1781–1861), who was the Director of the Institute of Anatomy at Heidelberg University. Dilger was also the cousin of Generalmajor Hubert Lamey (1896-1981), the commander of the 118 Jager Division, as well as General der Kavallerie, Carl-Erik Koehler (1895–1958), the commander of the 20th Army Corps.

There are reports that Dilger served as a surgeon in the Bulgarian Army during the Balkan Wars (1912–1913), that he served in the U.S. Army Medical Corps, that he carried the rank of colonel in the Imperial German Army Medical Corps, and that he directed hospitals for the German Red Cross. None of the reports is substantiated.

== World War I ==
When World War I began, Dilger was in Germany, but he returned to the United States in 1915 with cultures of anthrax and glanders with the intention of biological sabotage on behalf of the German government's biological sabotage officer, Rudolf Nadolny. The U.S. was still neutral, but Germany wanted to prevent neutral countries from supplying Allied forces with livestock, and the fact that Dilger had a U.S. passport from 1908 onwards made it easy for him to travel to and from the U.S. Along with his brother Carl, Dilger established a laboratory in the Chevy Chase district north of Washington, DC, in which cultures of the causative agents of anthrax and glanders (Bacillus anthracis and Burkholderia mallei) were produced. A 1941 report revealed that the bacteria were to be painted onto the nostrils of horses.

In the U.S., Baltimore stevedores, who were at first recruited by German officers to plant incendiary devices among ships and wharves, were eventually given bottles of liquid culture with orders to infect horses near Van Cortland Park. The stevedores claimed to have done the deed with rubber gloves and needles.

The U.S. biological sabotage program is thought to have ended sometime in late 1916 after which Anton returned to Germany. Upon his return to the U.S., Dilger found himself under suspicion of being a German agent by the Federal Bureau of Investigation and fled to Mexico, where he used the surname "Delmar."

== Sabotage program ==
The United States was the only target of German biological sabotage to which Dilger traveled personally, but Romania, Norway, Spain, and South America were all wartime targets of the program. Dilger was the only known individual with the required medical knowledge to have presided over the program in Germany even if he was not directly involved in each country. The methods of infecting livestock became more advanced as the war progressed and went from crude needles to capillary tubes of bacterial culture hidden inside sugar cubes.

The effects of the German effort to sabotage the neutral support of Allied countries is unknown. Since reports were made of disease outbreaks among livestock, it is not known whether the cultures used were pathogenic or even viable. Certainly, the amateurish method by which the U.S. stevedores infected horses would have given rise to accidents, but none was reported. That alone is cause for suspicion among researchers of the cultures used. Indeed, in the treaties signed in the wake of World War I, no specific provisions were made for the prohibition of biological warfare; it is presumed officials either did not know about the German effort or did not consider it a serious threat.

His relative Jürgen Schöfer, Ph.D., now writes about biosafety in science magazines.
