= Triple alliance negotiations =

1939 Soviet-UK-France anti-Nazi talks

The Triple alliance negotiations (in Russian historiography, Moscow negotiations of 1939, Russian: Московские переговоры 1939 года) were held in Moscow in April − August of 1939 with the goal of creating a Soviet-Western triple alliance (USSR, Great Britain, France) for collective security against the Axis powers. Throughout the negotiations, the Soviet diplomats (Maxim Litvinov and, later, Vyacheslav Molotov) were concentrated on building a war-fighting coalition. By mid-August of 1939, USSR became convinced that the discussions are at a dead end, opted to accept the German overtures instead, and in a week had signed the Molotov-Ribbentrop pact. The negotiations can be considered a pivotal point on the road to the Second World War, a missed opportunity of an alliance that could have contained Germany at a much lower cost than the one ultimately paid by all three countries.

== Background ==
Between 1933 and 1939, Soviet Union was trying to build alliances in order to counteract the Axis expansionism. These efforts included mutual assistance treaties with France and Czechoslovakia (1935), military aid to Spanish Republicans and Chinese Nationalists, support for Czechs in 1938. The Soviet policies in this area were opportunistic, lacked the overall plan, and were conducted as reaction to proposals put forward by other states.

The decision by the West to abandon its policy of appeasement was prompted by rumors that, after takeover of Czechoslovakia, Hitler is aiming for Romania. On 18 March 1939 Britain had inquired about a response of USSR in case of an attack on Romania. After witnessing the Western pursuit of appeasement for five years, the Soviet response was initially tepid, with Litvinov convinced that Britain and France have no other options and will eventually come to the negotiating table with concrete proposals for an alliance. The change in the attitude of USSR came in mid-April and was spurred by signing of the German–Romanian Treaty on 23 March 1939, with USSR concerned that it will precipitate German military buildup on the Black Sea and along the border with Soviet Union, security guarantees issued by France and Britain for Greece and Romania on 13 April, and the French proposal to amend the Franco-Soviet treaty of 1935.

The sides viewed the contemporary state of international relations in dramatically different ways:

- Britain and France thought that the war with Germany can be avoided. At the same time, they dismissed the Soviet warfighting potential and considered USSR exclusively as a supply base in a war of attrition;
- USSR considered the war almost inevitable and Polish army as no match for the Germans.

When compared to Britain, France, who needed military assistance on land, was more eager to reach an agreement and better understood the danger of the alternative, potential cooperation between Germany and the USSR.

== Soviet choice between alliance with the West and Germany ==
Throughout most of negotiations, the alliance with Britain and France was the preferred solution for the USSR: for example, on 28 June 1939 Molotov rejected the Schulenburg's call for better Soviet-German relations, and on 1 July Pravda published an article emphasizing the British determination to resist aggression. The atmosphere became much worse by 17 July, possibly due to Germany suggesting the German-Soviet trade agreement and Neville Chamberlain rejecting an idea of a pact with the Soviet Union.

As late as July 1939, the Western negotiators discounted the chance of USSR reaching an understanding with Hitler, Britain considered reports of Soviets exploring this option as a negotiation ploy. Only on 29 July, Molotov had authorized the Soviet ambassador in Berlin, Astakhov, to signal that his country was ready for improved relations with Germany.

== First drafts ==
On the evening of 17 April, Litvinov had summoned the British ambassador William Seeds from a theater and presented him with a Soviet plan of a triple alliance. The objective of USSR was to establish from the outset of negotiations the need for mutual, binding, reciprocal obligations that would lead to an effective military alliance. Soviet diplomats were still skeptical about the seriousness of their Western counterparts, and their position was reinforced by the French counter-proposal received on 25 April that was so lopsided that Litvinov called it "humiliating" and "a mockery" (a "corrected" French draft, submitted on 29 April, was little better, still leaving out the defense of Baltic states). Britain did not reply at all.

== Molotov taking over ==
In the first days of May Molotov took over the reins of Soviet foreign policy. Litvinov's departure did not cause any changes in the USSR relations with Germany, as Molotov pursued the triple alliance negotiations "with the utmost vigor". His first initiative, on 10 May, was to soften Poland's opposition to the proposed Soviet-Western alliance. Since by that time Poland and Romania already received the guarantees from the West, USSR no longer needed an agreement to force Britain and France to go to war in case of Hitler attacking Poland, the Soviet interest in this aspect of agreement diminished. However, the perspectives of Hitler attacking Soviet Union through Baltic states became more worrisome with the Germany's occupation of Memel in March 1939.

Between May and July 1939, Molotov had partially succeeded in bringing the agreement close to the original Soviet proposal. However, he failed to persuade his Western counterparts to accept critical Soviet demands of a watertight, even if on paper, guarantee of Anglo-French assistance if the war first breaks between USSR and Germany, and military cooperation from the European allies of the West, like Poland.

Ambassador Seeds was unimpressed with the change of interlocutor, he noted that "Litvinov’s disappearance means chiefly the loss of an admirable technician or perhaps shock-absorber", while complaining later that Molotov "seemed to be either blindly acting on instructions or incapable of understanding" and had "rather foolish cunning of the type of the peasant".

== Negotiations ==
The first British response on 8 May restated the original plan of unilateral declaration by the USSR of intent to support Britain and France if they entered a war against Germany as a result of helping Poland. The Soviet diplomats decided not to reject the proposal outright (judging that it was not a final offer), but countered on 14 May with an aide-memoire restating the basic principles of the USSR position. Attempts to resolve the issues in London between the Soviet ambassador Maisky and British under-secretary Vansittart on 16−17 May failed. The new Anglo-French draft delivered on 27 May included waiting for deliberations at the League of Nations before taking action, a non-starter for the USSR ("a mere scrap of paper" as assistance would not come immediately). Attempts by Seeds and the French chargé d’affaires in Moscow Jean Payart to persuade Molotov that the text about the involvement of the League of Nations was added for purely public relations purposes initially failed. The draft also only covered countries that asked for assistance, thus effectively excluding the Baltic states.

The Soviet counter-proposal of 2 June referred to the principles of the League of Nations, but did not tie in with its procedures. The list of covered countries included Latvia, Estonia, Finland, Greece, Turkey, Romania, Poland, and Belgium. This ran against the British (and, to some extent, French) rejection of the idea of security guarantees issued to states that did not want them. The Western negotiators suggested a compromise general formulation not mentioning covered states explicitly, but this proposal was rejected by the USSR on June 10. Soviet concerns were driven by non-aggression treaties with Germany inked by Latvia and Estonia on June 7 (see German–Latvian Non-Aggression Pact and German–Estonian Non-Aggression Pact) and fear of the German takeover of the Baltics. The signing of these agreements eventually played an important role in convincing the USSR to go for a deal with Germany upon the collapse of the Moscow negotiations.

The British-French proposal on 15 June included a mechanism for consultations if the country menaced by Germany was unwilling to ask for assistance. In this case, mutual consultations would be required before activating the guarantee. The proposal was immediately rejected by the Soviets as it ignored the USSR's position that immediate action would be needed in case of a German threat to the Baltic states. Instead, the Soviets suggested limiting the pact to just a direct attack by Germany on any of the signatories.

The Western powers were concerned about being drawn into a war with Germany triggered by unilateral actions taken by the USSR in the Baltics without a cause that the West would consider justified. Therefore, the next proposal on 21 May still required an explicit threat to the security of one of the signatories before any action was taken with respect to third parties. This proposal was rejected by the Soviets the next day as substantially the same as the previous one. From the perspective of the USSR, the reluctance of the West to unambiguously guarantee the security of the Baltic states was an invitation for Hitler to attack the Soviet Union through this door.

The USSR correctly calculated that Britain and France would yield on the Baltic states due to their need for Soviet assistance in Poland and Romania. The new Western draft on 1 July agreed that all countries would have the same guarantee, but added Holland, Switzerland, and Luxembourg to the list. Arguing that the first two countries broke off diplomatic relations with the USSR, the Soviets proposed on 3 July to remove these countries from the list. At the same time, a concept of "indirect aggression" was introduced to counteract possible Fascist takeovers patterned on the 1938 Austrian Anschluss referendum (which is how the events actually unfolded later in Bulgaria and Romania). The issue of indirect aggression was met with understanding from Britain and France, although the exact definitions were being hammered out for weeks.

On 17 July, the Soviet negotiators learned that their assumption of a single agreement covering both political and military issues was wrong, and the Anglo-French diplomats insisted on signing the political agreement first, with negotiations on the military arrangements to follow. The military agreement was very important to the USSR due to its previous experience with the Franco-Soviet Treaty of Mutual Assistance, signed in 1935, where France did not follow through on the promise to sign a related military convention. After objections, Britain and France agreed with the position of the USSR on 23 July. Molotov had suggested that the military negotiations start immediately in Moscow.

=== Military negotiations ===
The circumstances of military negotiations were immediately problematic, with the West sending low-ranking negotiators that had no power to make decisions on the spot (for example, admiral Drax, the head of the British delegation, had no written powers to negotiate whatsoever), at the same time their positions back home allowed them to potentially stay in Moscow for a very long time. On the Soviet side, the discussions were headed by Kliment Voroshilov, the Commissar of Defense formally authorized to sign the agreement. The Western delegations were sent on a slow merchant ship, and arrived in Leningrad only on 9 August. The crucial military issue for discussion was the ability for the Red Army to pass through Poland and Romania in order to fight the Germans, with Soviets trying to secure such permission for years previously as a military supplement to the Franco-Soviet pact.

The problem of passage surfaced very quickly once the talks started on 12 August, with Voroshilov asking a blunt question, "would the Red Army be allowed to cross into Poland and Rumania in the event of the German aggression?" The Franco-British response was that, once under attack, these countries would allow Red Army in, and, in any case, USSR should negotiate with Poles and Romanians directly. Voroshilov responded that these countries were allies of Britain and France, thus the persuasion was up to Paris and London.

=== Collapse ===
The military discussions collapsed quickly. After getting no definite response on the question of passage, Voroshilov suggested an adjournment on 17 August while the Anglo-French negotiators were awaiting a response from their capitals. After pleading from the other side, Voroshilov agreed to resume the talks on 21 August, only to get no definite answer yet again. The talks were adjourned sine die on the same day and were not resumed.

== Outcome and its effects ==
Soviets considered a solid military alliance with the Western countries against Hitler to be "natural" and beneficial to both sides. The commitment of USSR to reaching the agreement was limited by the deep distrust of the West dating back to the generally adversarial state of relations after the Russian Revolution of 1917. Contributing to this lack of trust were the West's policies of appeasement of Hitler and rejection of Soviet proposals for collective security throughout the 1930s, as well as the slow and obstructionist approach of the West to the Moscow negotiations themselves. As A.J.P. Taylor had remarked:

If British diplomacy seriously aspired to alliance with Soviet Russia in 1939, then the negotiations towards this end were the most incompetent transactions since Lord North lost the American colonies …

From Moscow's point of view, the behavior of Anglo-French diplomacy could only be explained by the desire to use the negotiations as a tool to drag USSR into a war with Germany with Britain and France benefitting from standing on the sidelines. While this position can be characterized as "paranoia", its pessimistism is also shared by multiple historians in the West. After all, despite the utter failure of the Munich Agreement, no personnel changes were made among Western diplomats, and lord Halifax, the British foreign secretary, was set against a mutual assistance pact.

The outcome of negotiations arguably precipitated the events leading to the Second World War:

- a German attack on Poland became certain;
- elites in both Britain and France opted for the Phoney War policies;
- USSR turned to accommodation with Hitler and territorial expansion.

An anti-Hitler coalition that was forced onto previously unwilling participants in 1941, after Germany's attack on Soviet Union, lacked the voluntary character of the one envisioned during the Moscow negotiations of 1939, and was created under much more difficult circumstances, greatly increasing the cost of defeating Hitler to all three countries. The reinforced tradition of mistrust between the USSR and the West directly fed into the Cold War.

== See also ==
- London negotiations (1939)

== Works cited ==
- Roberts, Geoffrey (1996). "The Alliance that Failed: Moscow and the Triple Alliance Negotiations, 1939". European History Quarterly. 26 (3): 383–414. doi:10.1177/026569149602600303. ISSN 0265-6914.
- Watson, Derek (2000). "Molotov's Apprenticeship in Foreign Policy: The Triple Alliance Negotiations in 1939". Europe-Asia Studies. 52 (4). Taylor & Francis, Ltd., University of Glasgow: 695–722. doi:10.1080/713663077. ISSN 0966-8136. JSTOR 153322.
