= Technology during World War II =

Role and use of available technology in World War II

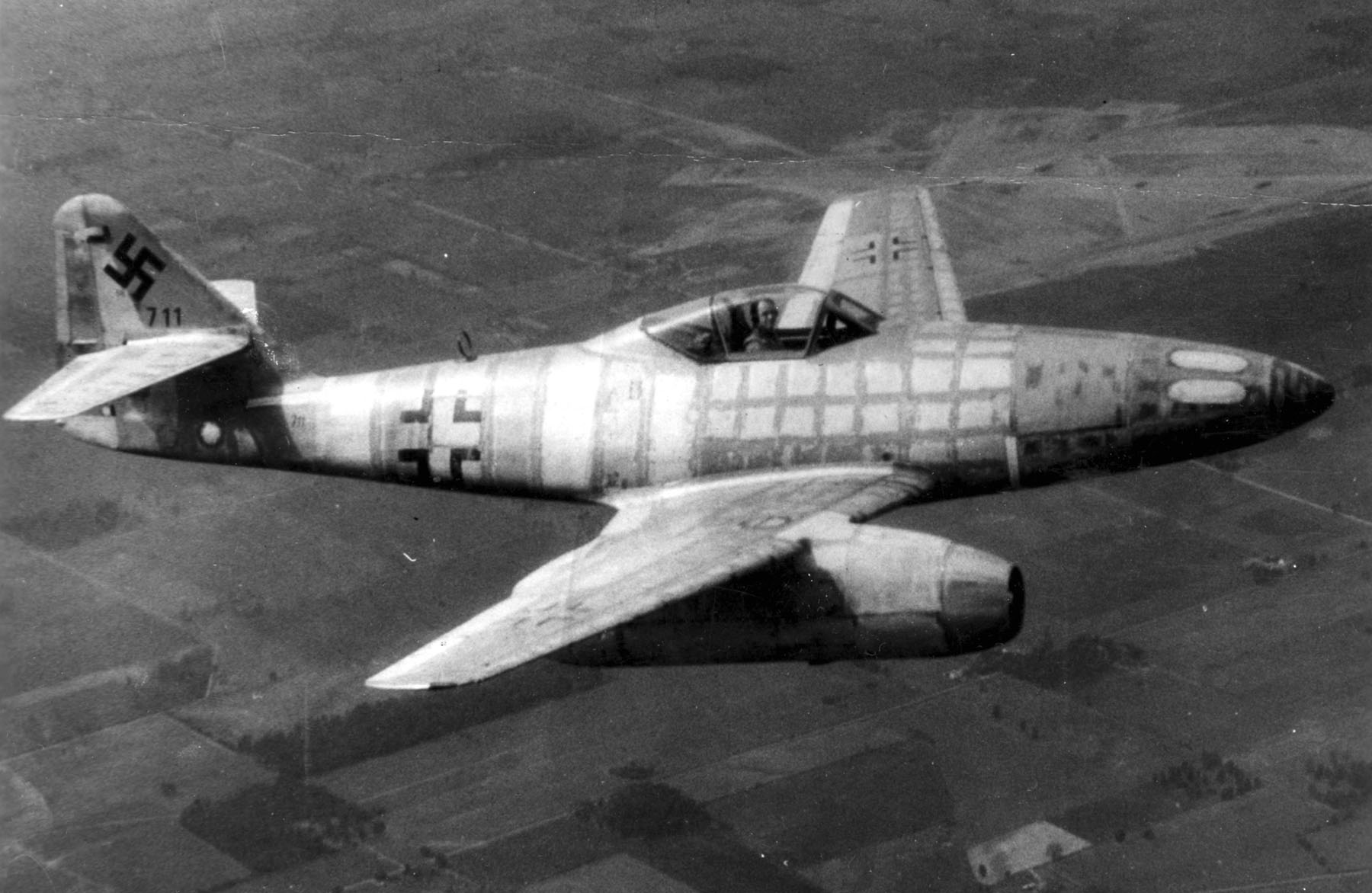
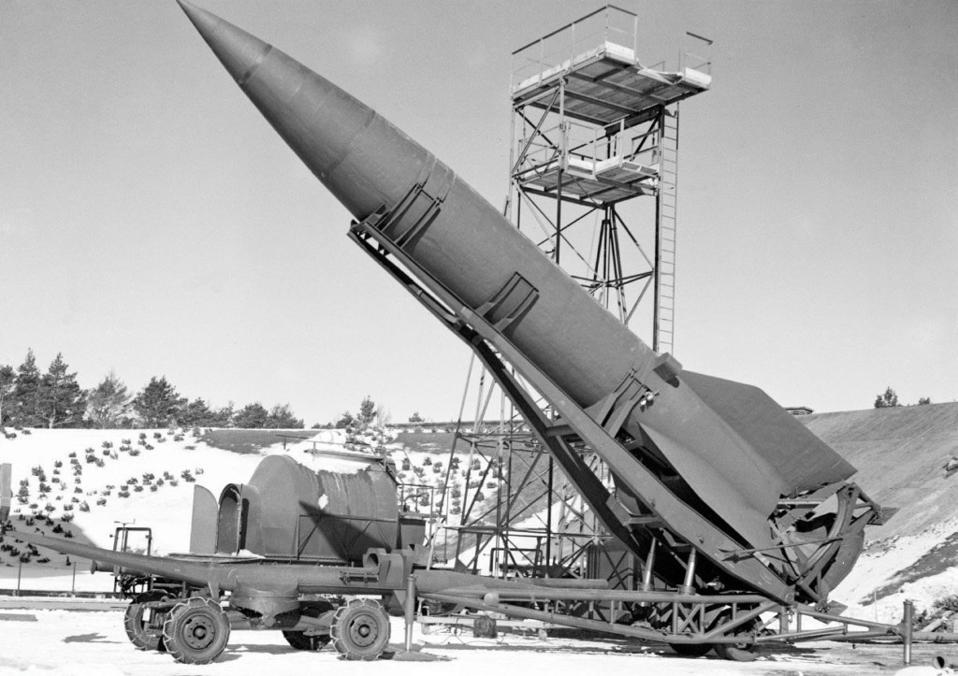
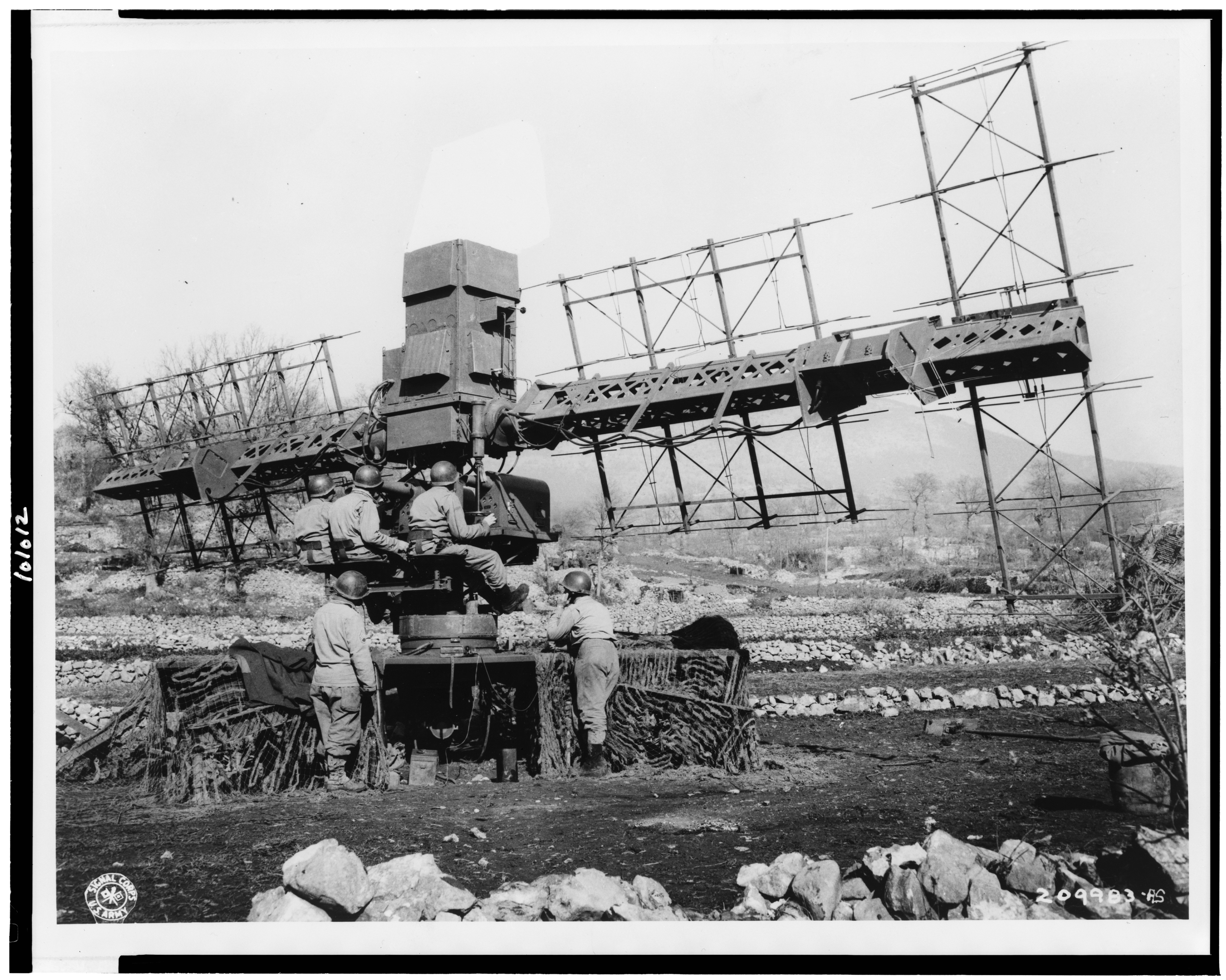
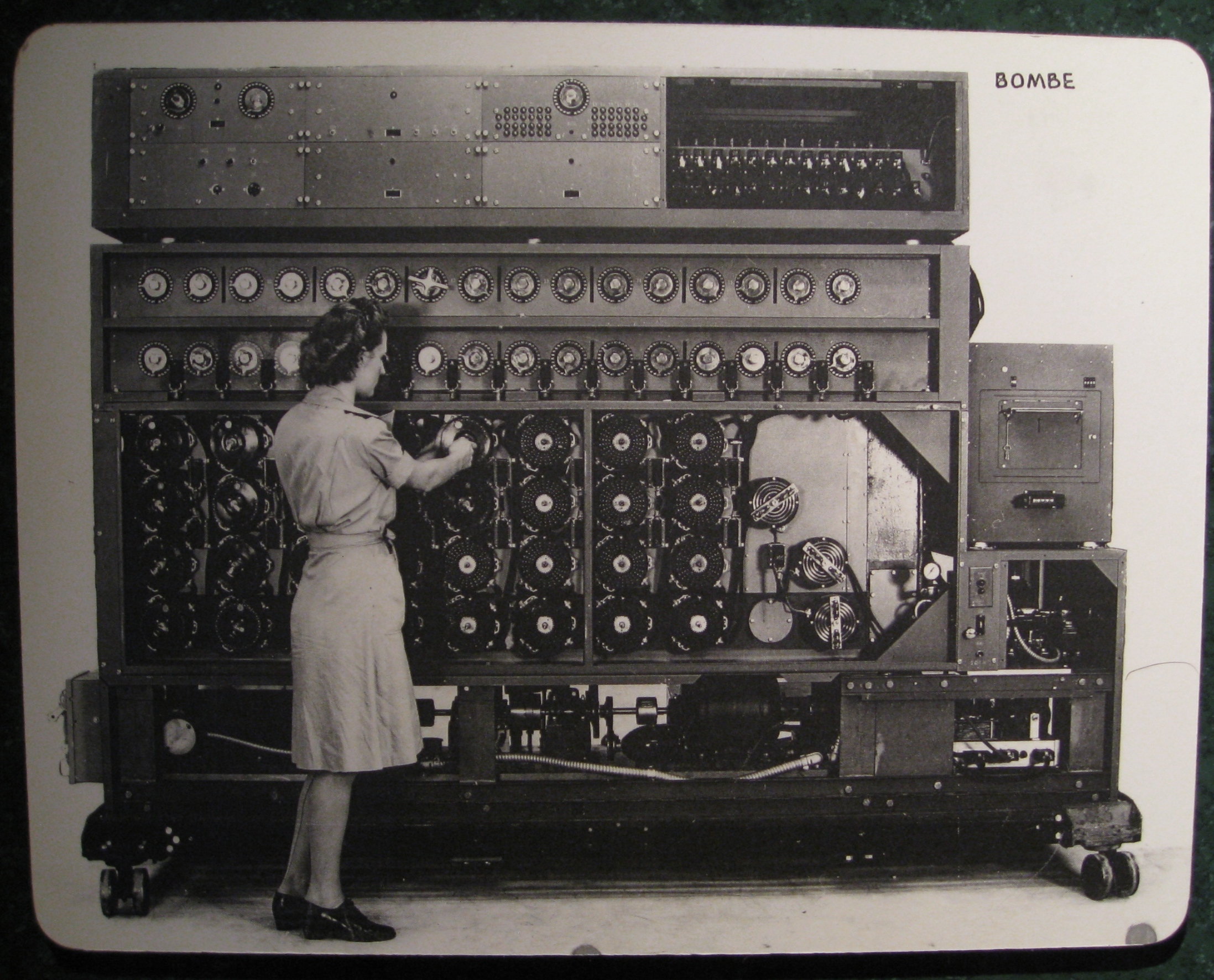
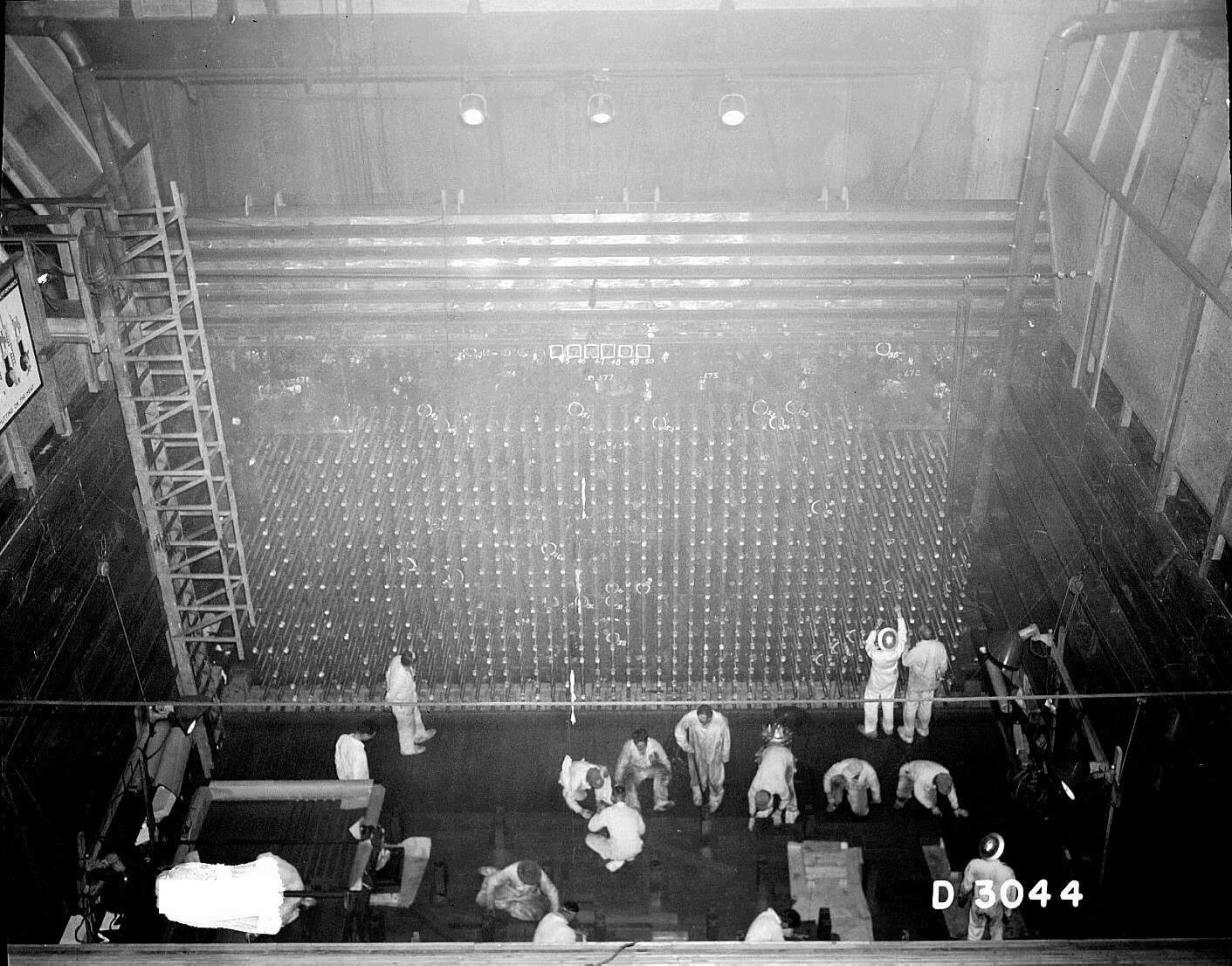
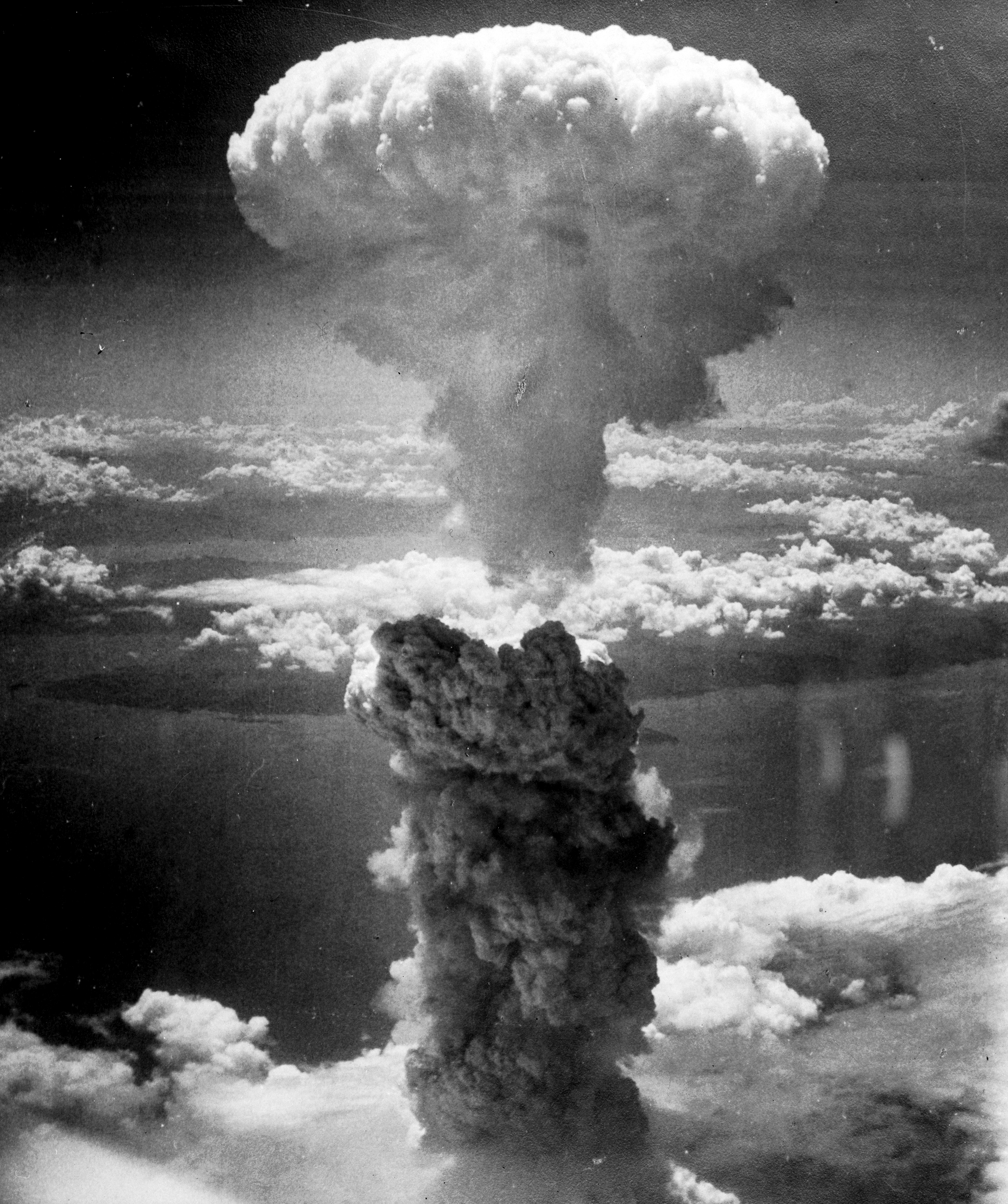
From top, left to right
- Messerschmitt Me 262, one of many jet aircraft developed during the war
- The V-2 short-range ballistic missile, a major advance in rocketry
- The SCR-268; radar was first widely deployed during the war
- The bombe, a cryptanalytic machine used by the Allies to break the Enigma code
- The B Reactor, nuclear reactors were first developed by the Allied Manhattan Project
- The bombing of Nagasaki; nuclear weapons were the aim of the Manhattan Project

Technology played a significant role in World War II. Some of the technologies used during the war were developed during the interwar years of the 1920s and 1930s. Many were developed in response to needs and lessons learned during the war, and others were beginning their development as the war ended. Wars often have major effects on peacetime technologies, but World War II had a profound and lasting effect on many everyday technologies and devices that are used today. Technology played an unprecedented role in the conduct of World War II and had a critical impact on its outcome.

Many types of technology were customized for military use, and major developments occurred across several fields including:

- Weaponry: ships, vehicles, submarines, aircraft, tanks, artillery, small arms; and biological, chemical, and atomic weapons
- Logistical support: vehicles necessary for transporting soldiers and supplies, such as trains, trucks, tanks, ships, and aircraft
- Communications and intelligence: devices used for remote sensing, navigation, communication, cryptography and espionage
- Medicine: surgical innovations, chemical medicines, and techniques
- Rocketry: guided missiles, medium-range ballistic missiles, and unmanned combat aerial vehicles

Military weapons technology experienced rapid advances during World War II, and over six years there was a disorientating rate of change in combat in everything from aircraft to small arms. Indeed, the war began with most armies using some technology that had changed little from that of World War I, and in some cases, had remained unchanged since the 19th century. For instance cavalry, trenches, and World War I-era battleships were normal in 1940, but six years later, armies around the world had developed jet aircraft, ballistic missiles, and even atomic weapons in the case of the United States.

World War II was the first war where military operations often targeted the research efforts of the enemy. This included the exfiltration of Niels Bohr from German-occupied Denmark to Britain in 1943; the sabotage of Norwegian heavy water production; and the bombing of Peenemunde. Military operations were also conducted to obtain intelligence on the enemy's technology; for example, the Bruneval Raid for German radar and Operation Most III for the German V-2.

== Interwar Period ==
In August 1919 the British Ten Year Rule declared the government should not expect another war within ten years. Consequently, they conducted very little military R&D. In contrast, Germany and the Soviet Union were dissatisfied powers who, for different reasons, cooperated with each other on military R&D. The Soviets offered Weimar Germany facilities deep inside the USSR for building and testing arms and for military training, well away from Treaty inspectors' eyes. In return, they asked for access to German technical developments, and for assistance in creating the Red Army General Staff.

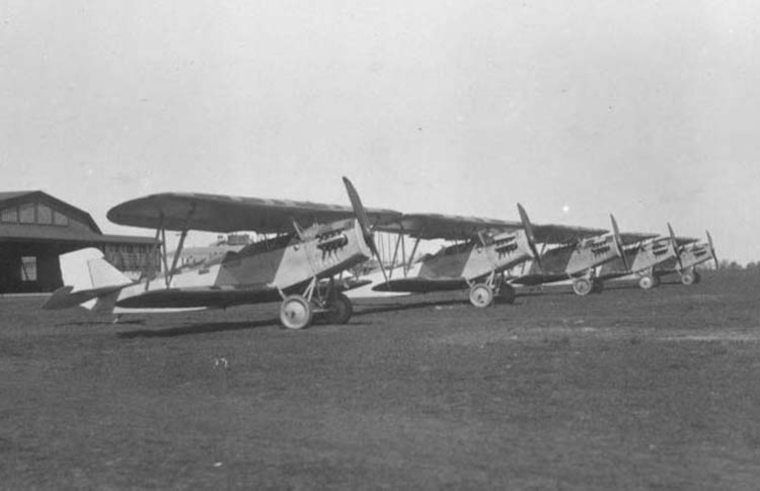
Heinkel HD 17 training planes at Lipetsk

The great artillery manufacturer Krupp was soon active in the south of the USSR, near Rostov-on-Don. In 1925, the Lipetsk fighter-pilot school was established near Lipetsk to train the first pilots for the future Luftwaffe. Since 1926, the Reichswehr used the Kama tank school in Kazan, and tested chemical weapons at the Tomka gas test site in Saratov Oblast. In turn, the Red Army gained access to these training facilities, as well as military technology and theory from Weimar Germany.

In the late 1920s, Germany helped the Soviet industry begin to modernize and to assist in the establishment of tank production facilities at the Leningrad Bolshevik Factory and the Kharkiv Locomotive Factory. This cooperation would break down when Hitler rose to power in 1933. The failure of the World Disarmament Conference marked the beginnings of the arms race leading to war.

In France the lesson of World War I was translated into the Maginot Line which was supposed to hold a line at the border with Germany. The Maginot Line did achieve its political objective of ensuring that any German invasion had to go through Belgium, ensuring that France would have Britain as a military ally. France and Russia had more, and much better, tanks than Germany at the outbreak of their hostilities in 1940. As in World War I, the French generals expected that armour would mostly serve to help infantry break the static trench lines and storm machine gun nests. They thus spread the armour among their infantry divisions, ignoring the new German doctrine of blitzkrieg based on fast, coordinated movement using concentrated armour attacks, against which the only effective defense was mobile anti-tank guns, as the old infantry antitank rifles were ineffective against the new medium and heavy tanks.

Air power was a major concern of Germany and Britain between the wars. The trade in aircraft engines continued, with Britain selling hundreds of its best to German firms – which used them in the first generation of aircraft and much improved them for use in later German aircraft. These new inventions led the way to major success for the Germans in World War II.

Germany was at the forefront of internal combustion engine development. The laboratory of Ludwig Prandtl at University of Göttingen was the world center of aerodynamics and fluid dynamics in general, until its dispersal after the Allied victory. This contributed to the German development of jet aircraft and of submarines with improved underwater performance. Meanwhile, the RAF secretly developed the Chain Home radar and Dowding system for defending against enemy planes.

Induced nuclear fission was discovered in Germany in 1939 by Otto Hahn (and expatriate Jews in Sweden), but many of the scientists needed to develop nuclear power had already been lost, due to Nazi anti-Jewish and anti-intellectual policies.

Science has long been relevant to military technology and scientific contributions have often been decisive. As Ian Jacob, the wartime military secretary of Winston Churchill, famously remarked on the influx of refugee scientists (including 19 Nobel laureates), "the Allies won the [Second World] War because our German scientists were better than their German scientists".

== Allied cooperation ==
The Allies of World War II cooperated extensively in the development and manufacture of existing and new technologies to support military operations and intelligence gathering during the Second World War. There were various ways in which the allies cooperated, including the American Lend-Lease scheme and hybrid weapons such as the Sherman Firefly as well as the British Tube Alloys nuclear weapons research project which was absorbed into the American-led Manhattan Project. Several technologies invented in Britain proved critical to the military and were widely manufactured by the Allies during the Second World War.

The origin of the cooperation stemmed from a 1940 visit by the Aeronautical Research Committee chairman Henry Tizard that arranged to transfer U.K. military technology to the U.S. in case of the successful invasion of the U.K. that Hitler was planning as Operation Sea Lion. Tizard led a British technical mission, known as the Tizard Mission, containing details and examples of British technological developments in fields such as radar, jet propulsion and also the early British research into the atomic bomb. One of the devices brought to the U.S. by the Mission, the resonant cavity magnetron, was later described as "the most valuable cargo ever brought to our shores".

== Vehicles ==
The best jet fighters at the end of the war easily outflew any of the leading aircraft of 1939, such as the Spitfire Mark I. The early war bombers that caused such carnage would almost all have been shot down in 1945, many by radar-aimed, proximity fuse-detonated anti-aircraft fire, just as the 1941 "invincible fighter", the Zero, had by 1944 become the "turkey" of the "Marianas Turkey Shoot". The best late-war tanks, such as the Soviet JS-3 heavy tank or the German Panther medium tank, handily outclassed the best tanks of 1939 such as Panzer IIIs. In the navy the battleship, long seen as the dominant element of sea power, was displaced by the greater range and striking power of the aircraft carrier. The chaotic importance of amphibious landings stimulated the Western Allies to develop the Higgins boat, a primary troop landing craft; the DUKW, a six-wheel-drive amphibious truck, amphibious tanks to enable beach landing attacks and Landing Ship, Tanks to land tanks on beaches. Increased organization and coordination of amphibious assaults coupled with the resources necessary to sustain them caused the complexity of planning to increase by orders of magnitude, thus requiring formal systematization giving rise to what has become the modern management methodology of project management by which almost all modern engineering, construction and software developments are organized.

=== Aircraft ===
In the Western European Theatre of World War II, air power became crucial throughout the war, both in tactical and strategic operations (respectively, battlefield and long-range). Superior German aircraft, aided by ongoing introduction of design and technology innovations, allowed the German armies to overrun Western Europe with great speed in 1940, assisted by lack of Allied aircraft, which in any case lagged in design and technical development during the slump in research investment after the Great Depression.

Since the end of World War I, the French Air Force had been badly neglected, as military leaders preferred to spend money on ground armies and static fortifications to fight another World War I-style war. As a result, by 1940, the French Air Force had only 1562 planes and was together with 1070 RAF planes facing 5,638 Luftwaffe fighters and fighter-bombers. Most French airfields were located in north-east France, and were quickly overrun in the early stages of the campaign. The Royal Air Force of the United Kingdom possessed some very advanced fighter planes, such as Spitfires and Hurricanes, but these were not useful for attacking ground troops on a battlefield, and the small number of planes dispatched to France with the British Expeditionary Force were destroyed fairly quickly. Subsequently, the Luftwaffe was able to achieve air superiority over France in 1940, giving the German military an immense advantage in terms of reconnaissance and intelligence.

German aircraft rapidly achieved air superiority over France in early 1940, allowing the Luftwaffe to begin a campaign of strategic bombing against British cities. Utilizing France's airfields near the English Channel the Germans were able to launch raids on London and other cities during the Blitz, with varying degrees of success.

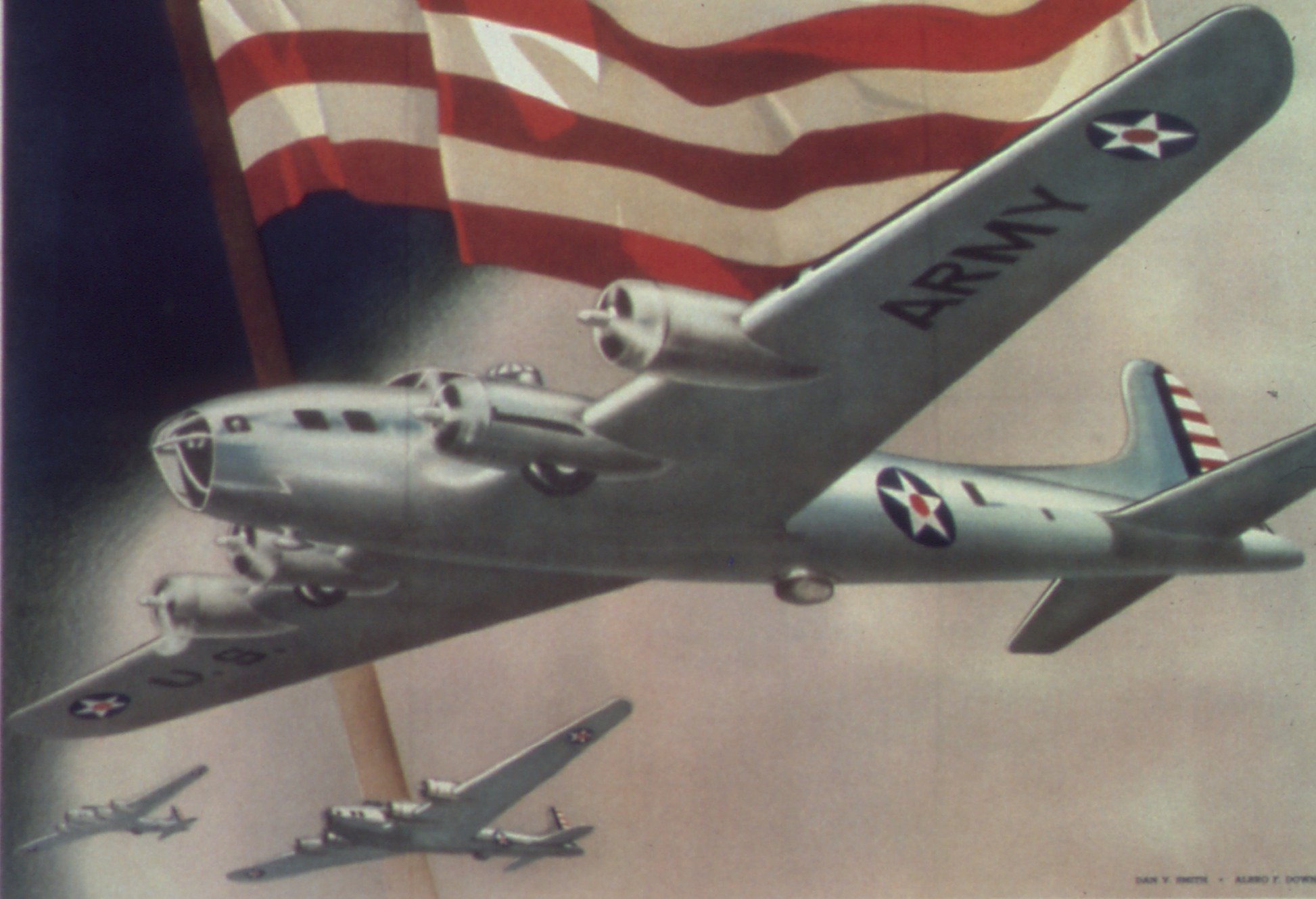
"Keep 'em Flying' is Our Battle Cry! First Class Men Needed." National Archives and Records Administration, en:National Archives at College Park

After World War I, the concept of massed aerial bombing—"The bomber will always get through"—had become very popular with politicians and military leaders seeking an alternative to the carnage of trench warfare, and as a result, the air forces of Britain, France, and Germany had developed fleets of bomber planes to enable this (France's bomber wing was severely neglected, whilst Germany's bombers were developed in secret as they were explicitly forbidden by the Treaty of Versailles).

Air warfare of World War II began with the bombing of Shanghai by the Imperial Japanese Navy on January 28, 1932, and August 1937. The bombings during the Spanish Civil War (1936–1939), further demonstrated the power of strategic bombing, and so air forces in Europe and the United States came to view bomber aircraft as extremely powerful weapons which, in theory, could bomb an enemy nation into submission on their own. The resulting fear of bombers triggered major developments in aircraft technology.

The Spanish Civil War had proved that tactical dive-bombing using Stukas was a very efficient way of destroying enemy troops concentrations, and so resources and money had been devoted to the development of smaller bomber craft. As a result, the Luftwaffe was forced to attack London in 1940 with heavily overloaded Heinkel and Dornier medium bombers, and even with the unsuitable Junkers Ju 87. These bombers were painfully slow—engineers had been unable to develop sufficiently large piston aircraft engines (those that were produced tended to explode through extreme overheating), and so the bombers used for the Battle of Britain were woefully undersized. As German bombers had not been designed for long-range strategic missions, they lacked sufficient defenses. The Messerschmitt Bf 109 fighter escorts had not been equipped to carry enough fuel to guard the bombers on both the outbound and return journeys, and the longer-range Bf 110s could be outmaneuvered by the short-range British fighters. (A bizarre feature of the war was how long it took to conceive of the Drop tank.) The air defense was well organized and equipped with effective radar that survived the bombing. As a result, German bombers were shot down in large numbers, and were unable to inflict enough damage on cities and military-industrial targets to force Britain out of the war in 1940 or to prepare for the planned invasion. Nazi Germany put into production only one large, long-range strategic bomber (the Heinkel He 177 Greif, with many delays and problems), while the America Bomber concept resulted only in prototypes.

British long-range bomber planes such as the Short Stirling had been designed before 1939 for strategic flights and given a large armament, but their technology still suffered from numerous flaws. The smaller and shorter ranged Bristol Blenheim, the RAF's most-used bomber, was defended by only one hydraulically operated machine-gun turret, which was soon revealed to be incapable of defending against squadrons of German fighter planes. American bomber planes such as the B-17 Flying Fortress had been built before the war as the only adequate long-range bombers in the world, designed to patrol the long American coastlines. With six machine-gun turrets providing 360° cover, the B-17s were still vulnerable without fighter protection even when used in large formations.

Despite the abilities of Allied bombers, though, Germany was not quickly crippled by Allied Strategic bombing during World War II. Accuracy was poor and Allied airmen frequently could not find their targets at night. The bombs used by the Allies were very technologically advanced devices, and mass production meant that the precision bombs were often made sloppily and so failed to explode. German industrial production actually rose continuously. Significantly, the bomber offensive kept the revolutionary Type XXI U-Boat from entering service during the war. Moreover, Allied air raids had a serious propaganda impact on the German government, all prompting Germany to begin serious development of air defense technology—in the form of fighter planes.

The practical jet aircraft age began just before the start of the war with the development of the Heinkel He 178, the first true turbojet. Late in the war, the Germans brought in the first operational Jetfighter, the Messerschmitt Me 262(Me 262). However, despite their seeming technological edge, German jets were often hampered by technical problems, such as short engine lives, with the Me 262 having an estimated operating life of just ten hours before failing. German jets were also overwhelmed by Allied air superiority, frequently being destroyed on or near the airstrip. The first and only operational Allied jet fighter of the war, the British Gloster Meteor, saw combat against German V-1 flying bombs but did not significantly distinguish from top-line, late-war piston-driven aircraft.

Aircraft saw rapid and broad development during the war to meet the demands of aerial combat and address lessons learned from combat experience. From the open cockpit airplane to the sleek jet fighter, many different types were employed, often designed for very specific missions. Aircraft were used in anti-submarine warfare against German U-boats, by the Germans to mine shipping lanes and by the Japanese against previously formidable Royal Navy battleships such as HMS Prince of Wales (53).

During the war the Germans produced various glide bombs, which were the first "smart" weapons; the V-1 flying bomb, which was the first cruise missile weapon; and the V-2 rocket, the first ballistic missile weapon. The latter of these was the first step into the space age as its trajectory took it through the stratosphere, higher and faster than any aircraft. This later led to the development of the Intercontinental ballistic missile (ICBM). Wernher von Braun led the V-2 development team and later emigrated to the United States where he contributed to the development of the Saturn V rocket, which took men to the moon in 1969.

==== Fuel ====
The Axis countries had serious shortages of petroleum from which to make liquid fuel. The Allies had much more petroleum production. Germany, long before the war, developed a process to make synthetic fuel from coal. Synthesis factories were principal targets of the Oil Campaign of World War II.

The USA added tetra ethyl lead to its aviation fuel, with which it supplied Britain and other Allies. This octane enhancing additive allowed higher compression ratios, allowing higher efficiency, giving more speed and range to Allied Airplanes, and reducing the cooling load.

=== Land vehicles ===
The Treaty of Versailles had imposed severe restrictions upon Germany constructing vehicles for military purposes, and so throughout the 1920s and 1930s, German arms manufacturers and the Wehrmacht had begun secretly developing tanks. As these vehicles were produced in secret, their technical specifications and battlefield potentials were largely unknown to the European Allies until the war actually began.

French and British Generals believed that a future war with Germany would be fought under very similar conditions as those of 1914–1918. Both invested in thickly armoured, heavily armed vehicles designed to cross shell-damaged ground and trenches under fire. At the same time the British also developed faster but lightly armoured Cruiser tanks to range behind the enemy lines.

Only a handful of French tanks had radios, and these often broke as the tank lurched over uneven ground. German tanks were, on the contrary, all equipped with radios, allowing them to communicate with one another throughout battles, whilst French tank commanders could rarely contact other vehicles.

The Matilda Mk I tanks of the British Army were also designed for infantry support and were protected by thick armour. This suited trench warfare, but made the tanks painfully slow in open battles. Their light armament was usually unable to inflict serious damage on German vehicles. The exposed caterpillar tracks were easily broken by gunfire, and the Matilda tanks had a tendency to incinerate their crews if hit, as the petrol tanks were located on the top of the hull. By contrast the Infantry tank Matilda II fielded in lesser numbers was largely invulnerable to German gunfire and its gun was able to punch through the German tanks. However French and British tanks were at a disadvantage compared to the air supported German armoured assaults, and a lack of armoured support contributed significantly to the rapid Allied collapse in 1940.

World War II marked the first full-scale war where mechanization played a significant role. Most nations did not begin the war equipped for this. Even the vaunted German Panzer forces relied heavily on non-motorised support and flank units in large operations. While Germany recognized and demonstrated the value of concentrated use of mechanized forces, they never had these units in enough quantity to supplant traditional units. However, the British also saw the value in mechanization. For them it was a way to enhance an otherwise limited manpower reserve. America as well sought to create a mechanized army. For the United States, it was not so much a matter of limited troops, but instead a strong industrial base that could afford such equipment on a great scale.

The most visible vehicles were the tanks of World War II, forming the armored spearhead of mechanized warfare. Their impressive firepower and armor made them the premier fighting machine of ground warfare. However, the large number of trucks and lighter vehicles that kept the infantry, artillery, and others moving were massive undertakings also.

=== Ships ===
Naval warfare changed dramatically during World War II, with the ascent of the aircraft carrier to the premier vessel of the fleet, and the impact of increasingly capable submarines on the course of the war. The development of new ships during the war was somewhat limited due to the protracted time period needed for production, but important developments were often retrofitted to older vessels. Advanced German submarine types came into service too late and after nearly all the experienced crews had been lost.

In addition to aircraft carriers, its assisting counterpart of destroyers were advanced as well. From the Imperial Japanese Navy, the Fubuki-class destroyer was introduced. The Fubuki class set a new standard not only for Japanese vessels, but for destroyers around the world. At a time when British and American destroyers had changed little from their un-turreted, single-gun mounts and light weaponry, the Japanese destroyers were bigger, more powerfully armed, and faster than any similar class of vessel in the other fleets. The Japanese destroyers of World War II are said to be the world's first modern destroyer.

The German U-boats were used primarily for stopping/destroying the resources from the United States and Canada coming across the Atlantic. Submarines were critical in the Pacific Ocean as well as in the Atlantic Ocean. Advances in submarine technology included the snorkel. Japanese defenses against Allied submarines were ineffective. Much of the merchant fleet of the Empire of Japan, needed to supply its scattered forces and bring supplies such as petroleum and food back to the Japanese archipelago, was sunk. Among the warships sunk by submarines was the war's largest aircraft carrier, the Shinano.

The Kriegsmarine introduced the pocket battleship to get around constraints imposed by the Treaty of Versailles. Innovations included the use of diesel engines, and welded rather than riveted hulls.

The most important shipboard advances were in the field of anti-submarine warfare. Driven by the desperate necessity of keeping Britain supplied, technologies for the detection and destruction of submarines was advanced at high priority. The use of ASDIC (SONAR) became widespread and so did the installation of shipboard and airborne radar. The Allies Ultra code breaking allowed convoys to be steered around German U-boat wolfpacks.

== Weapons ==
The actual weapons (guns, mortars, artillery, bombs, and other devices) were as diverse as the participants and objectives. A large array were developed during the war to meet specific needs that arose, but many traced their early development to prior to World War II. Torpedoes began to use magnetic detonators; compass-directed, programmed and even acoustic guidance systems; and improved propulsion. Fire-control systems continued to develop for ships' guns and came into use for torpedoes and anti-aircraft fire. Human torpedoes and the Hedgehog were also developed.

- Armoured vehicles: The tank destroyer, specialist tanks for combat engineering including mine clearing flail tanks, flame tank, and amphibious designs
- Aircraft: glide bombs – the first "smart bombs", such as the Fritz X anti-shipping missile, had wire or radio remote control; the world's first jet fighter (Messerschmitt Me 262) and jet bomber (Arado 234), the world's first operational military helicopters (Flettner Fl 282), the world's first rocket-powered fighter (Messerschmitt 163)
- Missiles: The pulse jet-powered V-1 flying bomb was the world's first cruise missile, Rockets progressed enormously: V-2 rocket, Katyusha rocket artillery and air-launched rockets.
- Specialised bombs: cluster bombs, blockbuster bombs, bouncing bombs, and bunker busters.
- Specialised warheads: high-explosive anti-tank (HEAT), and high-explosive squash head (HESH) for anti-armour and anti-fortification use.
- Proximity fuze for shells, bombs and rockets. This fuze is designed to detonate an explosive automatically when close enough to the target to destroy it, so a direct hit is not required and time/place of closest approach does not need to be estimated. Some torpedoes and mines used a magnetic pistol, a sort of proximity fuze that was not perfected during the war.
- Guided weapons (by radio or trailing wires): glide bombs, crawling bombs and rockets – the precursors of today's precision-guided munitions existed between 1942 and 1945, in the German Fritz X and Henschel Hs 293 anti-ship ordnance designs, which along with the American Azon, were all MCLOS radio-guided ordnance designs in World War II service.
- Self-guiding weapons: torpedoes (sound-seeking, compass-guided and looping), V1 missile (compass- and timer-guided), and the U.S. Navy's Bat air-launched anti-ship glide ordnance, using active radar homing for the first time anywhere.
- Aiming devices for bombs, torpedoes, artillery and machine guns, using special purpose mechanical and electronic analog and (perhaps) digital "computers". The mechanical analog Norden bomb sight is a well-known example.
- The first generation of nerve agents was invented and produced in Germany. Although a relatively large quantity was stockpiled by Germany, it was not deployed.
- Napalm was developed, but did not see wide use until the Korean War
- Plastic explosives like Nobel 808, Hexoplast 75, Compositions C and C2

=== Small arms development ===
New production methods for weapons such as stamping, riveting, and welding came into being to produce the number of arms needed. Design and production methods had advanced enough to manufacture weapons of reasonable reliability such as the PPSh-41, PPS-42, Sten, Beretta Model 38, MP 40, M3 Grease Gun, Gewehr 43, Thompson submachine gun and the M1 Garand rifle. Other weapons commonly found during World War II include the American Browning Automatic Rifle (BAR), M1 Carbine Rifle, and the Colt M1911 A-1 pistol; the Japanese Type 11 light machine gun, the Type 96 light machine gun, and the Arisaka bolt-action rifles all were significant weapons used during the war.

World War II saw the establishment of the reliable semi-automatic rifle, such as the American M1 Garand and, more importantly, of the first widely used assault rifles, named after the German sturmgewehrs of the late war. Earlier renditions that hinted at this idea were that of the employment of the Browning Automatic Rifle and 1916 Fedorov Avtomat in a walking fire tactic in which men would advance on the enemy position showering it with a hail of bullets. The Germans first developed the FG 42 for its paratroopers in the assault and later the Sturmgewehr 44 (StG 44), the world's first assault rifle, firing an intermediate cartridge; the FG 42's use of a full-powered rifle cartridge made it difficult to control.

Developments in machine gun technology culminated in the Maschinengewehr 42 (MG42) which was of an advanced design unmatched at the time. It spurred post-war development on both sides of the upcoming Cold War and is still used by some armies to this day including the German Bundeswehr's MG 3. The Heckler & Koch G3, and many other Heckler & Koch designs, came from its system of operation. The United States military meshed the operating system of the FG 42 with the belt feed system of the MG42 to create the M60 machine gun used in the Vietnam War.

Despite being overshadowed by self-loading/automatic rifles and sub-machine guns, bolt-action rifles remained the mainstay infantry weapon of many nations during World War II. When the United States entered World War II, there were not enough M1 Garand rifles available to American forces which forced the US to start producing more M1903 rifles in order to act as a "stop gap" measure until sufficient quantities of M1 Garands were produced.

During the conflict, many new models of bolt-action rifle were produced as a result of lessons learned from the First World War, with the designs of a number of bolt-action infantry rifles being modified in order to speed production and to make the rifles more compact and easier to handle. Examples include the German Mauser Kar98k, the British Lee–Enfield No.4, and the Springfield M1903A3. During the course of World War II, bolt-action rifles and carbines were modified even further to meet new forms of warfare the armies of certain nations faced e.g. urban warfare and jungle warfare. Examples include the Soviet Mosin–Nagant M1944 carbine, developed by the Soviets as a result of the Red Army's experiences with urban warfare e.g. the Battle of Stalingrad, and the British Lee–Enfield No.5 carbine, developed for British and Commonwealth forces fighting the Japanese in South-East Asia and the Pacific.

When World War II ended in 1945, the small arms that were used in the conflict still saw action in the hands of the armed forces of various nations and guerrilla movements during and after the Cold War era. Nations like the Soviet Union and the United States provided many surplus World War II-era small arms to a number of nations and political movements during the Cold War era as a pretext to providing more modern infantry weapons.

=== Atomic bomb ===
The discovery of nuclear fission by German chemists Otto Hahn and Fritz Strassmann in 1938, and its theoretical explanation by Lise Meitner and Otto Frisch, made the development of an atomic bomb a theoretical possibility. The prospect that a German atomic bomb project would develop one first alarmed scientists who were refugees from Nazi Germany and other fascist countries. In Britain, Frisch and Rudolf Peierls, working under Mark Oliphant at the University of Birmingham, made a breakthrough investigating the critical mass of uranium-235 in June 1939. Their calculations indicated that it was within an order of magnitude of 10 kilograms (22 lb), which was small enough to be carried by a bomber of the day. Their March 1940 Frisch–Peierls memorandum prompted the creation of the MAUD Committee to investigate. A directorate known as Tube Alloys was established in the Department of Scientific and Industrial Research under Wallace Akers to pursue the development of an atomic bomb.

In July 1940, Britain offered to give the United States access to its scientific research, and the Tizard Mission's John Cockcroft briefed American scientists on British developments. He discovered that although an American atomic bomb project already existed, it was smaller than the British, and not as far advanced. Oliphant flew to the United States in late August 1941 and spoke persuasively to Ernest O. Lawrence and other key American physicists about the feasibility and potential power of an atomic bomb.

Between 1942 and 1946, the American project was under the direction of Brigadier General Leslie R. Groves Jr. of the United States Army Corps of Engineers. The Army component of the project was designated the "Manhattan District" as its first headquarters were in Manhattan; this name gradually superseded the official codename, Development of Substitute Materials, for the entire project. The British and American projects were merged with the Quebec Agreement in August 1943, and a British mission joined Manhattan Project's sites in the United States. The Manhattan Project began modestly, but grew to employ nearly 130,000 people at its peak. Due to high turnover, over 500,000 people worked on the project. Three entire secret cities were built at Oak Ridge, Tennessee, Richland, Washington, and Los Alamos, New Mexico. The Manhattan Project cost nearly US$2 billion (equivalent to about $28 billion in 2025). Over 90 percent of the cost was for building factories and to produce fissile material, with less than 10 percent for development and production of the weapons. It was the second most expensive weapons project undertaken by the United States in World War II, behind only the Boeing B-29 Superfortress bomber.

The fissile Uranium-235 isotope makes up only 0.7 percent of natural uranium. Because it is chemically identical to the most common isotope, uranium-238, and has almost the same mass, separating the two proved challenging. Three methods were employed for uranium enrichment: electromagnetic, gaseous and thermal. This work was carried out at the Clinton Engineer Works at Oak Ridge, Tennessee. In parallel was an effort to produce plutonium, which was theorised to also be fissile, and could be produced by the nuclear transmutation of uranium in a nuclear reactor. The feasibility of a nuclear reactor was demonstrated in 1942 at the Manhattan Project's Metallurgical Laboratory at the University of Chicago with the start up of Chicago Pile-1. A pilot reactor, the X-10 Graphite Reactor, was constructed at the Clinton Engineer Works, and three production reactors were built at the Hanford Engineer Works in Washington state.

Work on weapon design was carried out by Project Y at Los Alamos under the direction of Robert Oppenheimer. The Manhattan Project pursued the development of two types of atomic bombs concurrently: a relatively simple gun-type fission weapon known as Thin Man and a more complex implosion-type nuclear weapon known as Fat Man. The gun-type design proved impractical to use with plutonium, so effort was concentrated on the implosion design. A simpler gun-type called Little Boy was then developed that used highly enriched uranium. Atomic bombs were then employed against the Japan in August 1945.

The German nuclear weapon project failed for a variety of reasons, most notably insufficient resources, time, and a lack of official interest in a project unlikely to yield results before the war ended. The leading nuclear physicist in Germany was Werner Heisenberg. Other key figures in the German project included Manfred von Ardenne, Walther Bothe, Kurt Diebner and Otto Hahn. The Japanese nuclear weapon program also floundered due to lack of resources despite gaining interest from the government.

== Electronics, communications and intelligence ==
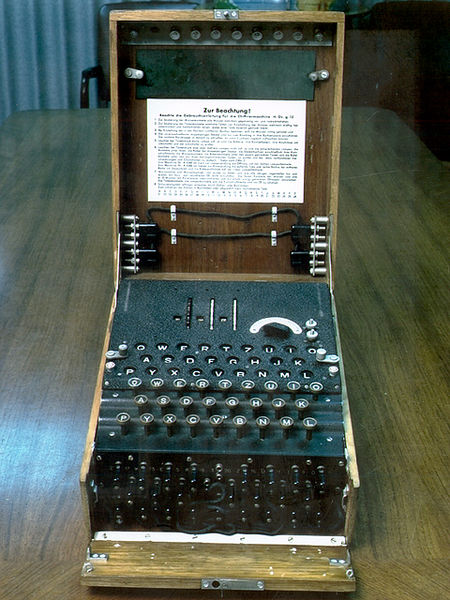
German Enigma encryption machine

Electronics rose to prominence quickly. Blitzkrieg was highly effective early in the war, with all German tanks having a radio. Enemy forces quickly learned from their defeats, discarded their obsolete tactics, and installed radios.

Combat Information Centers on ships and aircraft established networked computing, later essential to civilian life. While prior to the war few electronic devices were seen as important to war, by the middle of the war instruments such as the radar and ASDIC (sonar) had become invaluable. Germany started the war ahead in some aspects of radar, but lost ground to research and development of the cavity magnetron in Britain and to later work at the "Radiation Laboratory" of the Massachusetts Institute of Technology. Half of the German theoretical physicists were Jewish and had emigrated or otherwise been lost to Germany long before WW II started.

Equipment designed for communications and the interception of communications became critical. World War II cryptography became an important application, and the newly developed machine ciphers, mostly rotor machines, were widespread. By the end of 1940, the Germans had broken most American and all British military ciphers except the Enigma-based Typex.

The Germans in turn widely relied on their own variants of the Enigma coding machine for encrypting operations communications, and Lorenz cipher for strategic messages. The British developed a new method for decoding Enigma benefiting from information given to Britain by the Polish Cipher Bureau, which had been decoding early versions of Enigma before the war. Later, they also accomplished the cryptanalysis of the Lorenz cipher. The meticulous work of code breakers based at Britain's Bletchley Park played a crucial role in the final defeat of Germany.

German radio intelligence operations during World War II were extensive. The intercept part of signals intelligence was for the most part successful but success in cryptanalysis depended in large part on loose discipline in enemy radio operations.

Americans also used electronic computers for equations, such as battlefield equations, ballistics, and more. The Electronic Numerical Integrator and Computer (ENIAC) machine was the first general purpose computer, built in 1945. Previously, human computers would spend hours solving these equations. However, there were not enough mathematicians to handle the many ballistic equations that needed to be solved. The resulting Von Neumann architecture later became the basis of general-purpose computers.

== Rocketry ==
Rocketry was used greatly in World War II. There were many different inventions and advances in rocketry, such as the following.

The V-1, which is also known as the buzz bomb. This automatic aircraft would be known as a "cruise missile" today. The V-1 was developed at Peenemünde Army Research Center by the Nazi German Luftwaffe during the Second World War. During initial development it was known by the codename "Cherry Stone". The first of the so-called Vergeltungswaffen series designed for terror bombing of London, the V-1 was fired from launch facilities along the French (Pas-de-Calais) and Dutch coasts. The first V-1 was launched at London on 13 June 1944, one week after (and prompted by) the successful Allied landings in Europe. At its peak, more than one hundred V-1s a day were fired at south-east England, 9,521 in total, decreasing in number as sites were overrun until October 1944, when the last V-1 site in range of Britain was overrun by Allied forces. After this, the V-1s were directed at the port of Antwerp and other targets in Belgium, with 2,448 V-1s being launched. The attacks stopped when the last launch site was overrun on 29 March 1945.

The V-2 (German: Vergeltungswaffe 2, "Retribution Weapon 2"), technical name Aggregat-4 (A-4), was the world's first long-range guided ballistic missile. The missile with liquid-propellant rocket engine was developed during the Second World War in Germany as a "vengeance weapon", designed to attack Allied cities as retaliation for the Allied bombings of German cities. The V-2 rocket was also the first artificial object to cross the boundary of space.

These two rocketry advances took the lives of many civilians in London during 1944 and 1945.

== Medicine ==
Penicillin was first developed, mass-produced and used during the war. The widespread use of mepacrine (Atabrine) for the prevention of malaria, sulfanilamide, blood plasma, and morphine were also among the chief wartime medical advancements. Advances in the treatment of burns, including the use of skin grafts, mass immunization for tetanus and improvements in gas masks also took place during the war. The use of metal plates to help heal fractures began during the war.

== See also ==
- Military invention
- Military funding of science
- Military production during World War II
- List of equipment used in World War II
- List of ships of the Second World War
- List of aircraft of World War II
