= Albatros L 65 =

L 65
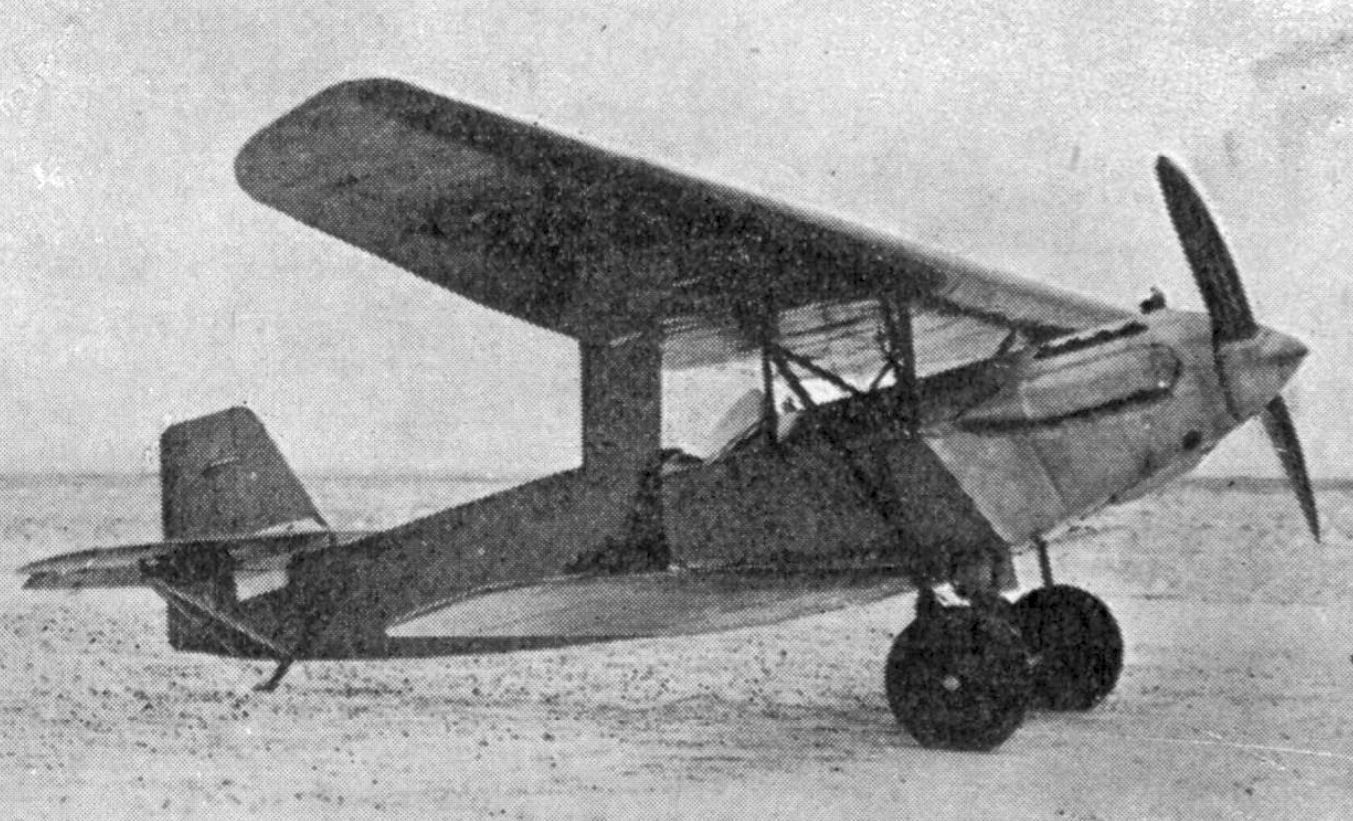
- Memel A.F.G.1

General information
- Type: Reconnaissance aircraft
- Manufacturer: Albatros Flugzeugwerke
- Number built: 2

History
- First flight: 1925

The Albatros L 65 was a German two-seat reconnaissance fighter biplane first flown in 1925.

== Design and development ==
Under the Treaty of Versailles, military aircraft production was restricted in Germany, so Albatros Flugzeugwerke established a subsidiary to build the L 65 in Lithuania. This company was named Allgemeine Flug-Gesellschaft (A.F.G.) Memel, hence the L 65 was also known as the Memel A.F.G.1 (Memel being the German name for the city of Klaipėda).

The L 65 had a single-bay, staggered biplane configuration and was constructed of wood with a plywood skin. The wings were braced by interplane I-struts of broad aerofoil cross-section. Two prototypes were built, the first powered by a 340 kW (450 hp) water-cooled 12-cylinder "broad-arrow" Napier Lion engine; the second had its first flight in 1926 and had a 421 kW (565 hp) version of the Lion. The second prototype underwent evaluation by the Reichswehr to equip the clandestine training school at Lipetsk, but the Heinkel HD 17 was selected instead and no further aircraft were produced.

== Specifications (L 65, second prototype) ==
General characteristics

- Crew: two, pilot and observer
- Length: 7.58 m (24 ft 10 in)
- Wingspan: 12.40 m (40 ft 8 in)
- Height: 3.38 m (11 ft 1 in)
- Wing area: 27.8 m^{2} (299 sq ft)
- Empty weight: 1,260 kg (2,780 lb)
- Gross weight: 1,840 kg (4,060 lb)
- Powerplant: 1 × Napier Lion XI , 420 kW (565 hp)

Performance

- Maximum speed: 240 km/h (150 mph, 130 kn)
- Range: 600 km (370 mi, 320 nmi)
- Service ceiling: 6,200 m (20,400 ft)
- Rate of climb: 5.9 m/s (1,160 ft/min)

Armament

- 1 × fixed, forward-firing 7.92 mm (.312 in) machine gun
- 1 × flexible 7.92 mm (.312 in) machine gun for observer
