= Treaty of Rapallo =

Treaty of Rapallo may refer to:

- Treaty of Rapallo (1920), an agreement between the Kingdom of Italy and the Kingdom of Serbs, Croats and Slovenes
- Treaty of Rapallo (1922), an agreement between the German Reich and Soviet Russia
