= Yakov Fishman =

Yakov Fishman may refer to:

- Yakov Moiseevich Fishman (1887-1961), Russian politician and revolutionary
- Yakov Leybovich Fishman (1913–1983), chief rabbi of Moscow
