= Heinkel HD 17 =

Aircraft

HD 17
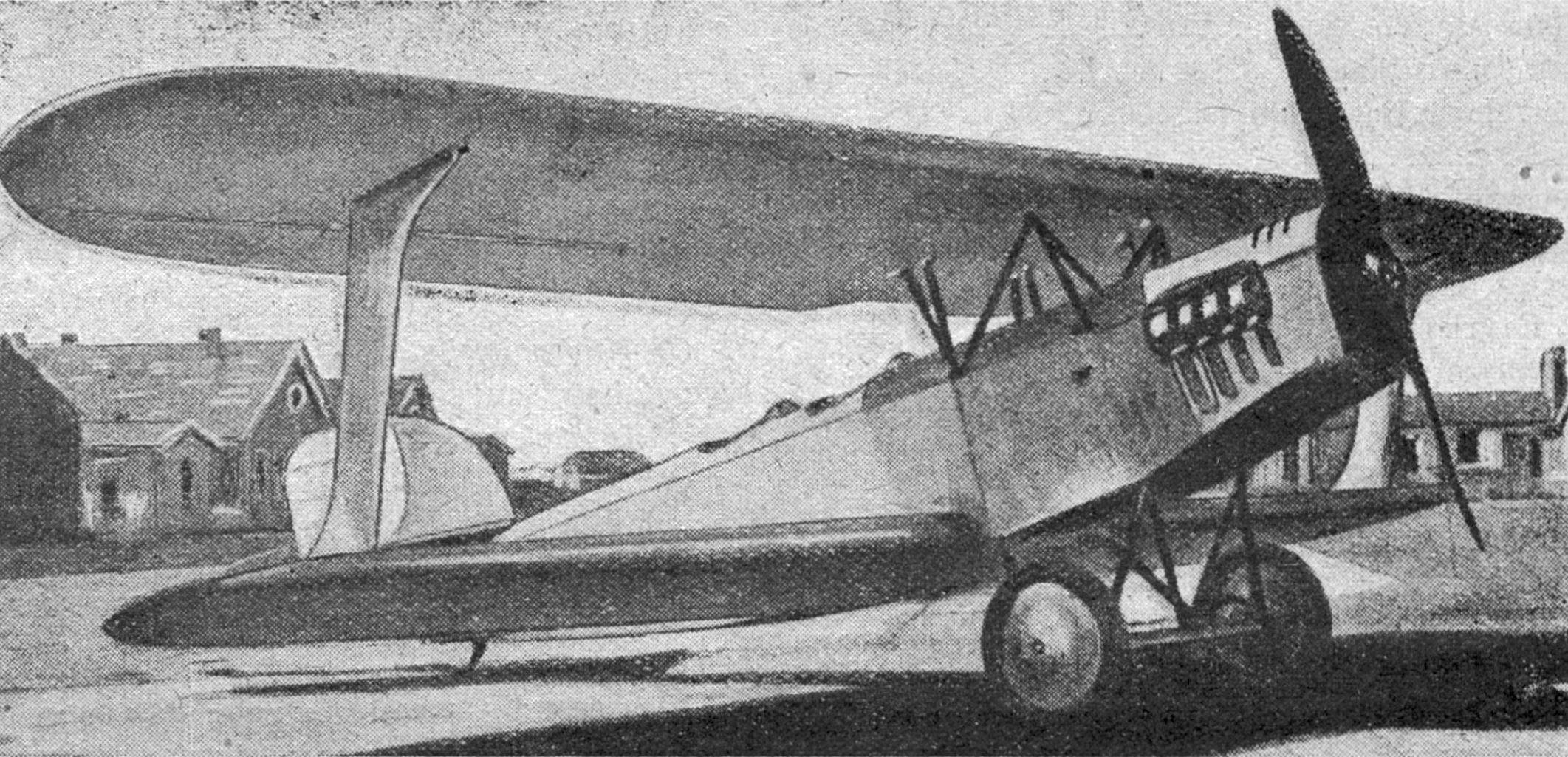
- Cox-Klemin CO-1 P-377

General information
- Type: Reconnaissance aircraft
- National origin: German-Swiss
- Manufacturer: Svenska Aero AB
- Designer: Ernst Heinkel
- Primary user: Reichswehr

History
- First flight: 1924

The Heinkel HD 17 was a military reconnaissance aircraft produced in Germany in the late 1920s.

== Design ==
The Heinkel HD 17 was a conventional single-bay biplane with strongly staggered wings of unequal span braced with N-type interplane struts. The pilot and observer sat in tandem, open cockpits, and the main units of the fixed, tailskid undercarriage were linked by a cross-axle.

== Operational history ==
The Heinkel HD 17 first flew in 1924. In 1926, it was evaluated by the Reichswehr to equip the secret aviation training school at Lipetsk, and was selected in favour of the competing Albatros L 65. Seven aircraft were purchased and used briefly for training until replaced by more modern designs.

Two Heinkel HD 17s were evaluated in 1924 by the US Army Air Service, being modified by Cox-Klemin to use a Napier Lion and Liberty 12 respectively. Designated by Cox-Klemin as CO-1 and CO-2 respectively (Project numbers P-377 and P-379 were allocated respectively), these planes had no provisions for military equipment during evaluation tests, but were rejected by the USAAS and returned to Cox-Klemin.

== Specifications (CO-1) ==
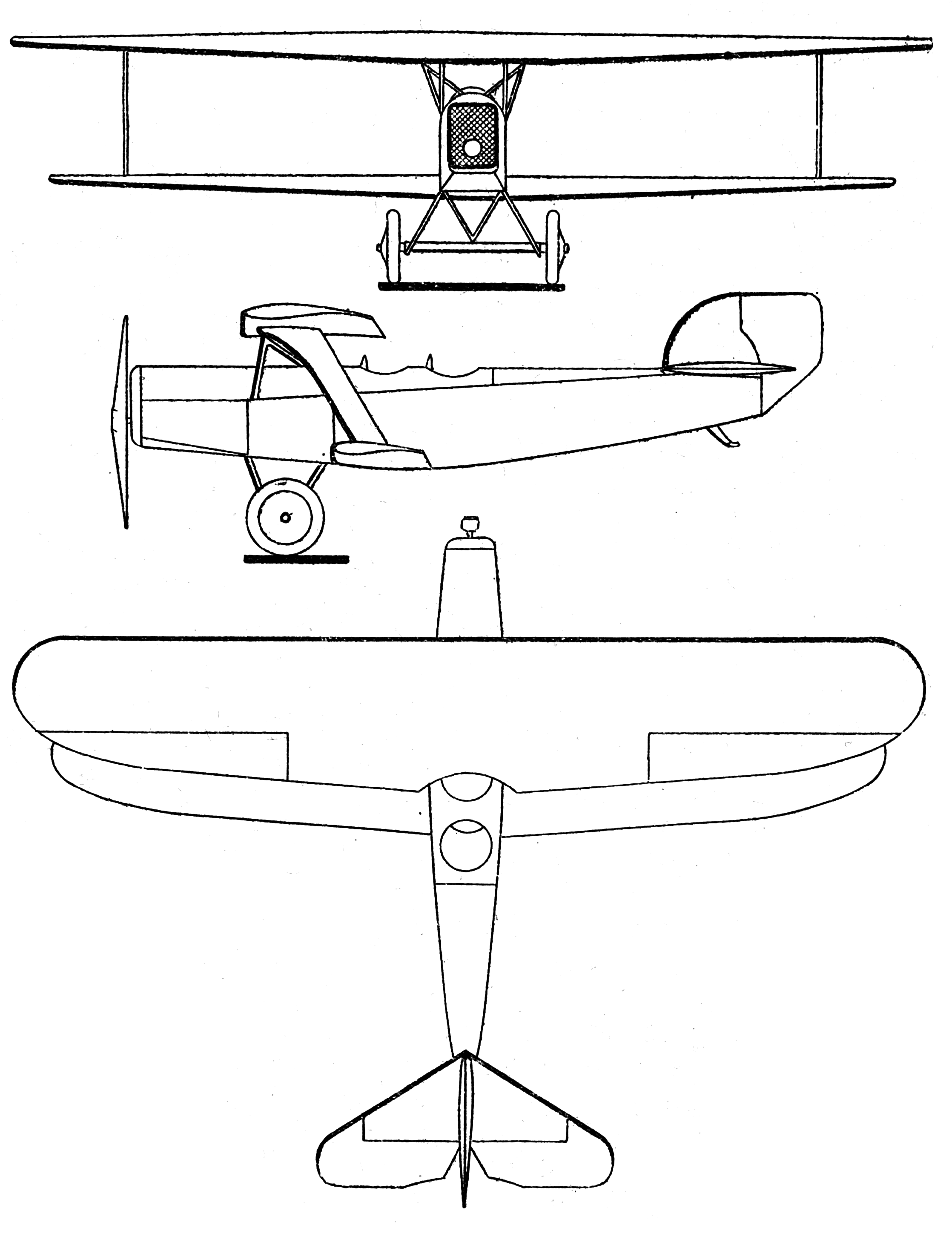
Heinkel HD 17 3-view drawing from Les Ailes January 7, 1926

Data from Les Ailes, December 1925

General characteristics

- Crew: Two
- Length: 9.48 m (31 ft 1 in)
- Upper wingspan: 12.40 m (40 ft 8 in)
- Lower wingspan: 11.40 m (37 ft 5 in)
- Height: 3.30 m (10 ft 10 in)
- Wing area: 38 m^{2} (410 sq ft)
- Empty weight: 1,350 kg (2,976 lb)
- Gross weight: 2,050 kg (4,519 lb)
- Powerplant: 1 × Napier Lion water-cooled W-12, 340 kW (450 hp)
- Propellers: 2-bladed

Performance

- Maximum speed: 240 km/h (150 mph, 130 kn)
- Time to altitude: 8 min to 2,000 m (6,600 ft)
