= Ernst Volckheim =

German military officer

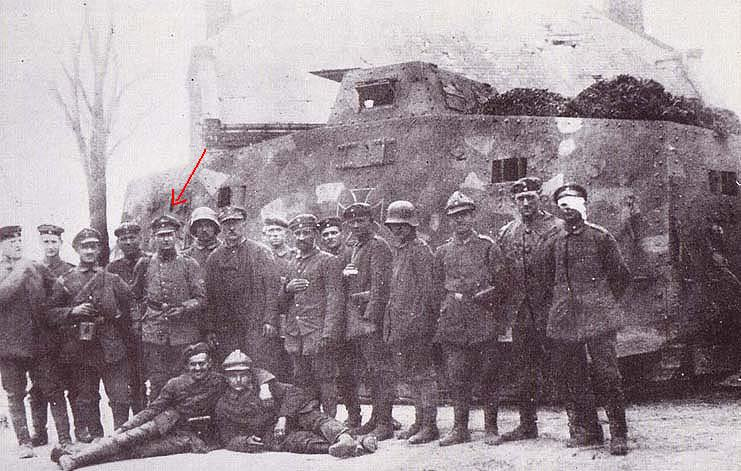
- Ernst Volckheim (arrow) with the crew of A7V tank "Alter Fritz", 1918
- Born: 11 April 1898; Bornheim, Germany
- Died: 1 September 1962 (aged 64); Germany
- Military career
- Allegiance: German Empire: Kingdom of Prussia; Weimar Republic; Nazi Germany
- Branch: Imperial German Army: Prussian Army; Reichsheer; German Army
- Service years: 1915–1945
- Rank: Colonel (Oberst)
- Commands: Oberkommando des Heeres; Panzer-Abteilung 40
- Conflicts: World War I: First Battle of Villers-Bretonneux; World War II

Ernst Volckheim (11 April 1898 – 1 September 1962) was one of the founders of armored and mechanized warfare. A German officer in the First and Second World War, Volkheim rose to the rank of colonel, during World War II in the German Army. Little known outside of professional military and historical circles, Volckheim is considered the foremost military academic influence on German tank war proponent, Heinz Guderian, because both Volckheim's teaching as well as his 1924 professional military articles place him as one of the very earliest theorists of armored warfare and the use of German armored formations including independent tank corps.

== Life ==
Ernst Volckheim joined the Prussian Army in 1915 as a war volunteer and in 1916 he was commissioned as a lieutenant. In 1917 he was given command of a machine gun company and served on the Western Front during the First World War. In April, 1918, as a member of the imperial tank corps, Volckheim fought in the First Battle of Villers-Bretonneux and won the tank battle's armor insignia. Shortly before the end of the war he was severely wounded.

At the end of World War I, Volckheim joined the newly established Reichswehr, and served as a lieutenant in the Kraftfahrtruppe. With his transfer to an inspector of transport troops in 1923, Volckheim also began his theoretical work on the use of armored vehicles as an element of combat leadership. In 1925, Volckheim, still a young lieutenant, was ordered to the officer school in Dresden and there began to teach armored combat theory and operational concepts including in the use of motorized troops. Between 1923 and 1927, he published numerous articles and books on the subject of armored combat in the military journal, Militär Wochenblatt. (Military Weekly). This work caught the attention of retired General Konstantin Altrock, the publisher of the Militär Wochenblatt. Soon after, Volckheim became the magazine's editor in chief and frequent contributor to the monthly magazine. From 1932 to 1933, Volckheim was a tactics instructor, training Soviet military exchange officer instructors at the secret German-Soviet tank school "Kama" in Kazan. There, Volckheim both lectured and gained practical experience with tanks and motorized warfare. In the late 1930s, he worked on the development of the guiding principles of armored combat doctrine for the newly developed and still largely secret German armored forces.

== Influence on Heinz Guderian ==
While the much better known German officer, General Heinz Guderian would claim by the 1930s to be the "Father of Blitzkrieg", and give Volckheim only passing credit, this claim has been challenged in modern times by such military historians as James S. Corum as a gross self-exaggeration. In fact, Guderian's actual publications before 1936 were relatively few in number, and historians such as Corum have claimed that they did not address questions of fundamental armored combat doctrine. Guderian's famous book, Achtung Panzer was an influential early publication on armored warfare, and while forcefully written, when compared to Volckheim's early writings, Guderian's book was not particularly original. Modern historians now see Guderian's true inspiration for German armored doctrine to be the largely unsung Volckheim. Guderian made only passing mention of Volckheim in his memoirs. Nevertheless, no matter how much Volckheim's ideas directly influenced Guderian, Guderian's much higher rank as a general officer and consequent influence within both Army and Nazi Party circles, it would be Guderian who would become one of the driving forces in both the development and wider acceptance of the possibilities of armored and mechanized forces in the German Army.

== World War II ==
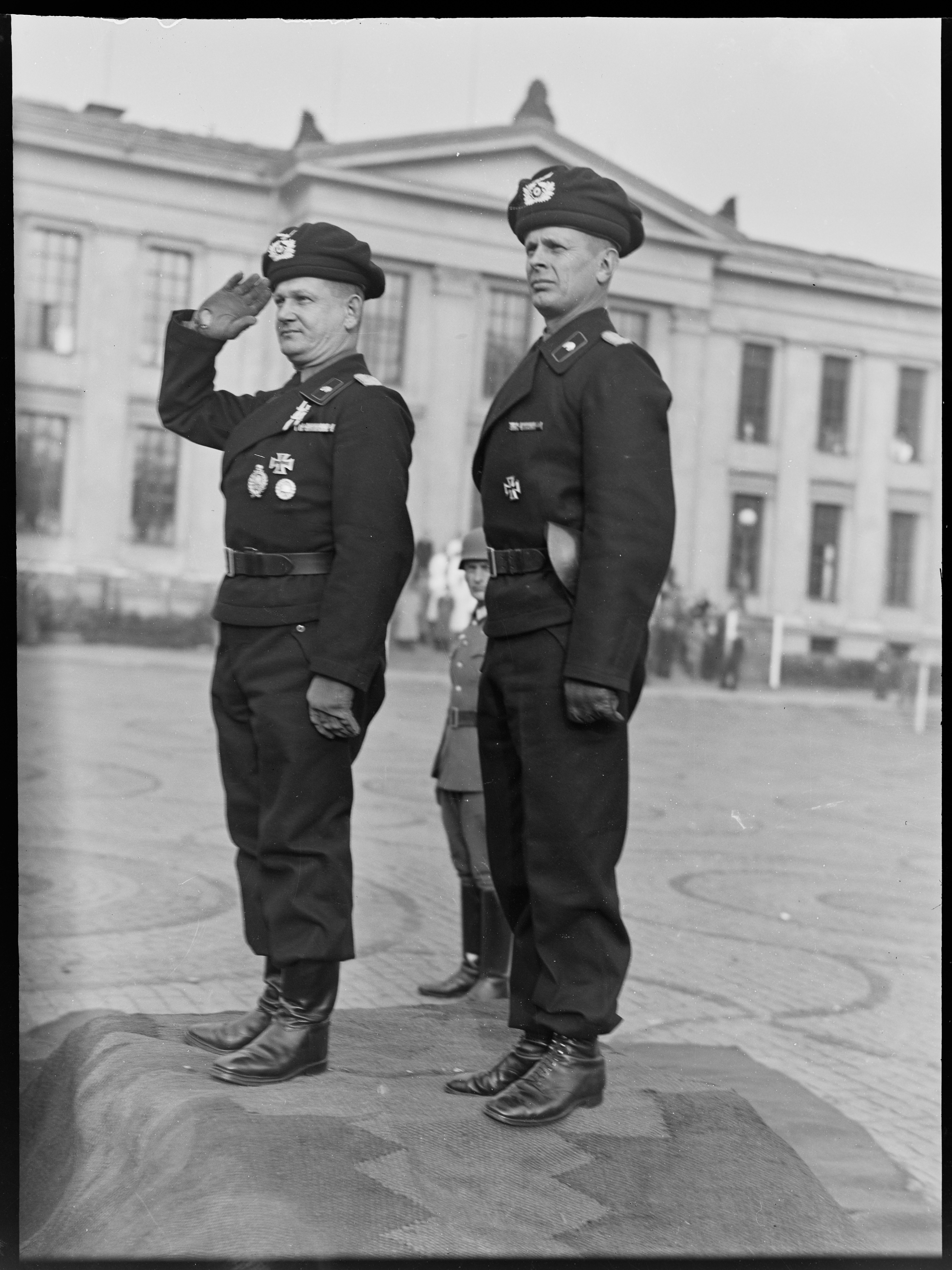
Lieutenant Colonel Ernst Volckheim (to the left) dressed in black Panzer uniform saluting parading troops of Panzer-Abteilung z.b.V. 40 in Oslo, Norway on October 1st, 1940. Photo: Riksarkivet (National Archives of Norway)

At the onset of World War II, Lieutenant Colonel Volckheim served on the staff of the 1st Panzer Division (Wehrmacht) and subsequently commanded the 40th Armored Battalion (Panzer-Abteilung z.b.V. 40) in Norway in 1940. In 1941, he was given command of the armored troops school in Wünsdorf near Berlin.

He was subsequently assigned to the General Staff, where he participated in the planning and execution of the secret tank operations and its tactics.

== Awards ==
- Iron Cross of 1914, 1st and 2nd class
- Clasp to the Iron Cross, 1st and 2nd Class
- Tank Memorial Badge
- Wound Badge (1918) in Silver
- Honour Cross of the World War 1914/1918 (Ehrenkreuz für Frontkämpfer)
- Panzer Badge in Silver
- Wehrmacht Long Service Award (Wehrmacht-Dienstauszeichnung)

== Works ==
=== Books ===
- Ernst Volckheim: Die deutschen Kampfwagen im Weltkriege (German Tanks in the World War), Berlin 1923; later republished under Ernst Volckheim: Deutsche Kampfwagen greifen an! Erlebnisse eines Kampfwagenführers an der Westfront 1918 (German Tanks Attack! - Experiences of a tank commander on the Western front in 1918), Berlin 1937.
- Ernst Volckheim: Der Kampfwagen in der heutigen Kriegführung (Tanks in Today's Warfare), Berlin 1924.
- Ernst Volckheim: Der Kampfwagen und Abwehr dagegen (The Tank and Anti-tank Defenses), Berlin, 1925.

=== Articles ===
- Ernst Volckheim: "Über Kampfwagen im Bewegungskrieg" (On tanks in maneuver warfare), Military Maneuver, August 3, 1924, Berlin.
- Ernst Volckheim: "Kampfwagenverwendung im Bewegungskrieg" (The use of tanks in maneuver warfare), Military Maneuver, August 10, 1924, Berlin.
- Ernst Volckheim: "Raupen oder Räderantrieb bei Kampfwagen" (Propelling tanks with tracks or wheels), Military Maneuver, August 5, 1924, Berlin.
- Ernst Volckheim: "Die deutsche Panzerwaffe" (The German armored force), with Georg Wetzell (editors), German Army Magazine. Berlin, 1939, p. 293-338.
