= Treaty of Rapallo (1922) =

Treaty re-establishing diplomatic and military relations between Russia and Germany

Coordinates: 44°20′10″N 9°13′10″E

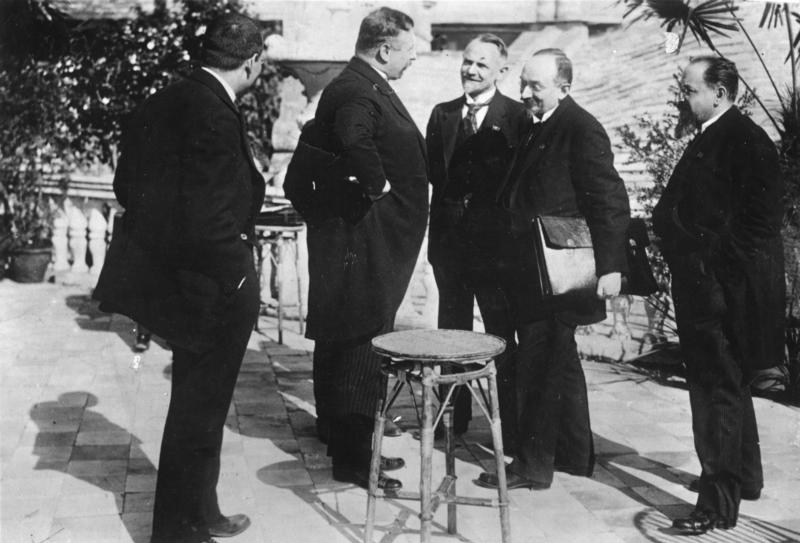
- Chancellor of Germany Joseph Wirth (second from left) with Leonid Krasin, Georgi Chicherin and Adolph Joffe from the Russian delegation
- Type: Bilateral treaty
- Signed: 16 April 1922
- Location: Rapallo, Italy
- Signatories: Walther Rathenau; Georgy Chicherin
- Parties: Germany; Russian SFSR
- Ratifiers: Germany Soviet Russia

The Treaty of Rapallo was an agreement signed on 16 April 1922 between Germany and Russia under which both renounced all territorial and financial claims against each other and opened friendly diplomatic relations. The treaty was negotiated by Russian foreign minister Georgi Chicherin and German foreign minister Walther Rathenau. It was a major victory for Russia especially and also Germany, and a major disappointment to France and the United Kingdom. The term "spirit of Rapallo" was used for an improvement in friendly relations between Germany and Russia.

The treaty was signed in Rapallo, Italy. Ratifications were exchanged in Berlin on 31 January 1923, and registered in League of Nations Treaty Series on 19 September 1923. The treaty did not include any military provisions, but secret military co-operation was already scheduled between Germany and Russia, which was a violation of the Treaty of Versailles.

A supplementary agreement, signed in Berlin on 5 November, extended the treaty to cover Germany's relations with the other Soviet republics: Armenia, Azerbaijan, Byelorussia, Georgia, and Ukraine. Ratifications were exchanged in Berlin on 26 October 1923, and the supplementary protocol was registered in League of Nations Treaty Series on 18 July 1924. The agreement was reaffirmed by the Treaty of Berlin in 1926.

== Background ==
Both Germany and Russia were left vulnerable after the end of the First World War. Germany had lost the war and become diplomatically isolated, and the postwar Treaty of Versailles led to German disarmament and the cession of German territories, including all her colonies. Russia had left the war in 1917 because of the Bolshevik Revolution and ceded many of its western territories to Germany at the Treaty of Brest-Litovsk. After Germany's defeat in the war in 1918, the territory was transformed into a number of new independent states, including Poland. Like Germany, Russia was left diplomatically isolated, as its transition to communist rule had led to the loss of western allies as "the policies pursued by the victors, especially France, left no alternative to Germany but to move closer to Russia".

Germany initially hoped to pursue peaceful changes to the Treaty of Versailles, and its main territorial goal was to reclaim certain portions of western Poland. An initially-conciliatory posture failed in 1919, which led Germany to institute an economic blockade of Poland in January 1920. The effort to force changes also failed and led to severe losses for German businessmen. Those failures led Germany to look for other alternatives, which reached their most extreme form in the proposal of Hans von Seeckt, the commander of the Reichswehr (German military), who suggested for Germany and Russia to conclude an alliance for a joint invasion of Poland and then a war on France. His proposals did not have much impact on official policy, but the general idea of seeking closer cooperation with Russia began to gain currency among a number of groups, including German businessmen who saw market opportunities there.

Like Germany, Russia hoped to make territorial gains at Poland's expense but was left without an effective means of doing so. In early 1919, the Polish–Soviet War had broken out over border disputes. After initial Russian victories, the Poles counterattacked successfully, and a compromise peace was reached in March 1921, which left Soviet desires for border revision largely unfulfilled. The war also left the Russians even further isolated from Britain and France.

The common isolation and interest in revision in Poland led to a natural sympathy between Russia and Germany. At the Tenth Party Conference in 1921, the Russians settled on a policy of pursuing opportunities for trade with the Western powers, which could supply badly needed industrial materials:

Germany and Russia were rapidly moving closer together because each could use what the other had to offer. Russia needed Germany's skilled, now idle industrial workers, its engineers, and general knowledge of advanced industrial methods. For Germany, Russia provided an outlet for its energies, a market for its products, and a source of raw materials.

The joint German–Russian concerns first led to the signing in May 1921 of a treaty under which Germany recognised the Soviet regime as the only legitimate government of Russia and agreed to suspend relations with all other Russian groups that still claimed power. The treaty paved the way for future German–Russian co-operation.

== Negotiations ==
=== Meeting in Genoa ===
British Prime Minister David Lloyd George and French Prime Minister Aristide Briand feared that the terms of the 1919 Treaty of Versailles were too harsh on Germany, would prevent its full economic recovery and would hurt all of Europe. Both men needed a diplomatic victory to secure their shaky political status. They called a new international "Economic and Financial Conference" of 34 nations in the Italian city of Genoa in April 1922. All the major countries were invited, but the United States refused to attend. Also not invited were the two pariah nations of Germany and Soviet Russia; in the latter, Communists had recently won a civil war.

Lloyd George, excessively confident in his own diplomatic skills, brought along no senior members from the British Foreign Office. To his consternation, there was a change in the French government. The new prime minister, Raymond Poincaré, was aggressively hostile to Germany. He felt that the terms of the reparations demanded of Germany were not harsh enough and would allow an economic recovery for France's great enemy. Poincaré replaced Lloyd George's ideas with a scheme to hurt Germany and planned to work with the Russians, who had not been represented at Versailles but were allowed to ask for reparations. Before 1917, Western European financial interests had made heavy loans and investments in Tsarist Russia, which the new communist regime refused to honour. Because of that refusal to pay the old debts, Russia was economically and politically isolated from the rest of the world. Poincaré's scheme, which was kept secret from the Germans, would involve an entirely-new round of financial reparations to be paid by Germany to the Russians, and in turn, the Russians would use that money to pay off those old debts. Russia's leader, Vladimir Lenin, had reversed earlier plans to organize anticapitalist revolutions across Europe and now sought a peaceful interlude of economic development. His New Economic Policy would necessitate extensive trade with the outside world. However Lenin was in poor health and left Russian foreign policy to Georgy Chicherin.

Russia had already started collaboration with a German military in a project so secret that the German civilian government and diplomats did not know about it, but it made Moscow much more favourable toward a friendly deal with Germany. Furthermore France was trying to impose strict controls on Russian trade. In the German government, attitudes were split between the "Easterners", who wanted closer ties with Russia and included many diplomats and the socialists, and the "Westerners", who gave priority to normalising relations with Britain and France. Foreign Minister Walther Rathenau, the head of the German delegation, was a committed Westerner but was open to argument.

=== Meeting in Rapallo ===
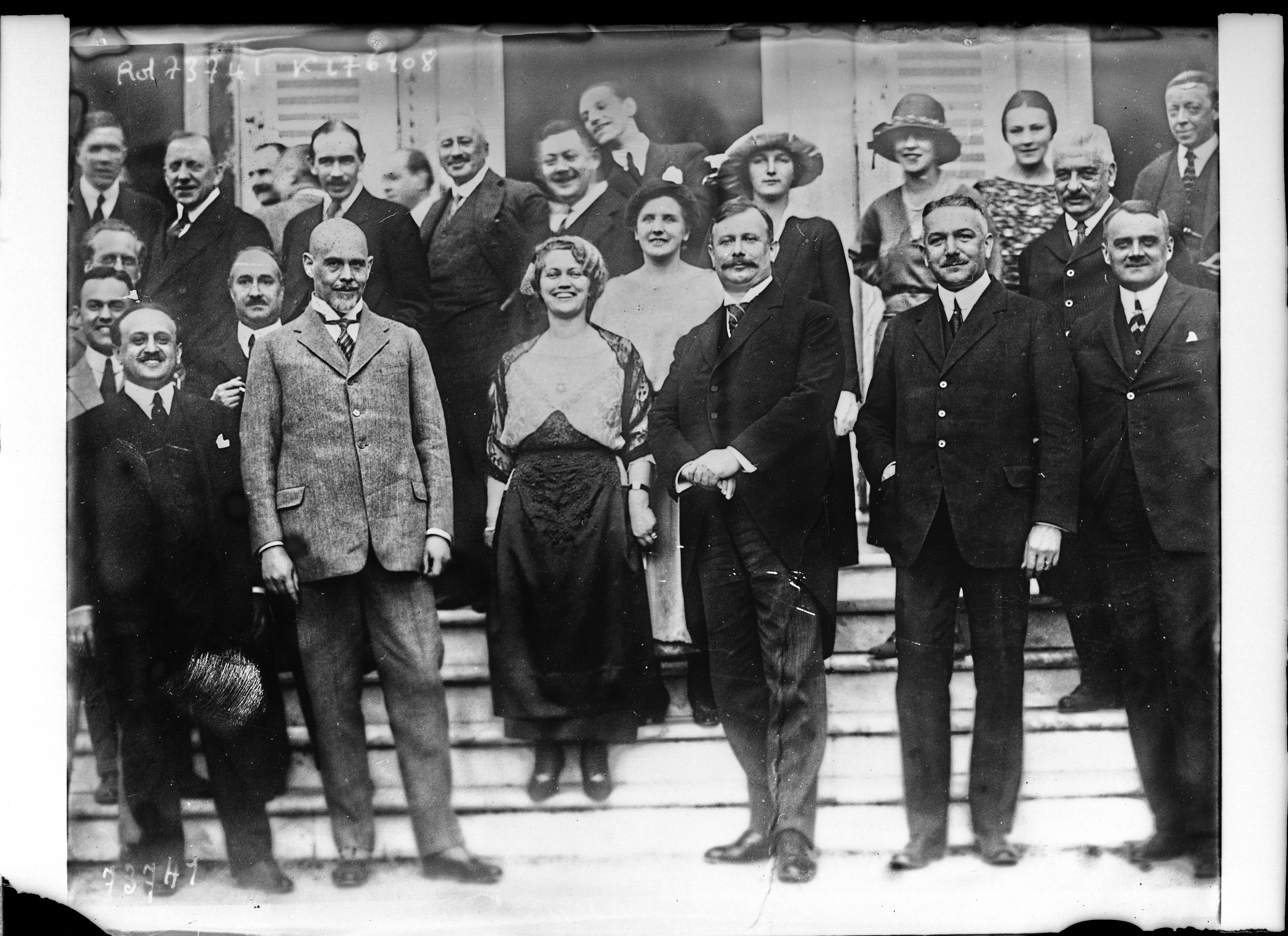
German delegation to the Genoa Conference, At the front is Walter Rathenau (second from the left) and Joseph Wirth (third from the right)

While the main conference was dragging on in Genoa, the Russian and the German delegations secretly met at Rapallo, a nearby small resort city, and quickly signed a treaty involving mutual diplomatic recognition, cancellation of debts owed in each direction and pledges to increase economic ties.

The Rapallo Treaty provided diplomatic cover for military cooperation, which was kept top secret, and allowed Germany to rebuild its military arsenal in Russia with the establishment of a flying school at Lipetsk, the building of a chemical weapons plant at Volsk, a tank school near Kazan, two factories for the production of tanks near Moscow and Rostov-on-Don and joint battlefield manoeuvres. In return, Russian officers could be trained undercover in German military academies. The military entente was underpinned by a trading agreement whereby German banks offered credit lines to Russia to buy military and industrial machinery and supplies, and Russia could export vast quantities of grain.

The Rapallo Treaty was a stunning surprise. Its news caused the collapse of the main conference at Genoa. Lloyd George and Poincaré denounced the treaty vehemently.

== Text of agreement ==
The German Government, represented by Dr Walther Rathenau, Minister of State, and the Government of the Russian Socialist Federal Soviet Republic, represented by M. Tchitcherin, People's Commissary, have agreed upon the following provisions:

Article 1
The two Governments are agreed that the arrangements arrived at between the German Reich and the Russian Socialist Federal Soviet Republic, with regard to questions dating from the period of war between Germany and Russia, shall be definitely settled upon the following basis:

[a] The German Reich and the Russian Socialist Federal Soviet Republic mutually agree to waive their claims for compensation for expenditure incurred on account of the war, and also for war damages, that is to say, any damages which may have been suffered by them and by their nationals in war zones on account of military measures, including all requisitions in enemy country. Both Parties likewise agree to forgo compensation for any civilian damages, which may have been suffered by the nationals of the one Party on account of so-called exceptional war measures or on account of emergency measures carried out by the other Party.

[b] Legal relations in public and private matters arising out of the state of war, including the question of the treatment of trading vessels which have fallen into the hands of either Party, shall be settled on a basis of reciprocity.

[c] Germany and Russia mutually agree to waive their claims for compensation for expenditure incurred by either party on behalf of prisoners of war. Furthermore, the German Government agrees to forgo compensation within regard to the expenditure incurred by it on behalf of members of the Red Army interned in Germany. The Russian Government agrees to forgo the restitution of the proceeds of the sale carried out in Germany of the army stores brought into Germany by the interned members of the Red Army mentioned above.

Article 2
Germany waives all claims against Russia which may have arisen through the application, up to the present, of the laws and measures of the Russian Socialist Federal Soviet Republic to German nationals or their private rights and the rights of the German Reich and states, and also claims which may have arisen owing to any other measures taken by the Russian Socialist Federal Soviet Republic or by their agents against German nationals or the private rights, on condition that the government of the Russian Socialist Federal Soviet Republic does not satisfy claims for compensation of a similar nature made by a third Party.

Article 3
Diplomatic and consular relations between the German Reich and the Russian Socialist Federal Soviet Republic shall be resumed immediately. The conditions for the admission of the Consuls of both Parties shall be determined by means of a special agreement.

Article 4
Both Governments have furthermore agreed that the establishment of the legal status of those nationals of the one Party, which live within the territory of the other Party, and the general regulation of mutual, commercial and economic relations, shall be effected on the principle of the most favoured nation. This principle shall, however, not apply to the privileges and facilities which the Russian Socialist Federal Soviet Republic may grant to a Soviet Republic or to any State which in the past formed part of the former Russian Empire.

Article 5
The two Governments shall co-operate in a spirit of mutual goodwill in meeting the economic needs of both countries. In the event of a fundamental settlement of the above question on an international basis, an exchange of opinions shall previously take place between the two Governments. The German Government, having lately been informed of the proposed agreements of private firms, declares its readiness to give all possible support to these arrangements and to facilitate their being carried into effect.

Article 6
Articles 1[b] and 4 of this Agreement shall come into force on the day of ratification, and the remaining provisions shall come into force immediately.
Original text done in duplicate at Rapallo on 16 April 1922

Signed: Rathenau

Signed: Tchitcherin

== Text of Supplementary Agreement 5 November 1922 ==
The plenipotentiary of the German Government, namely Freiherr Adolf Georg von Maltzan, Permanent Under-Secretary for Foreign Affairs; the plenipotentiary of the Socialist Soviet Republic of Ukraine, namely, Herr Waldemar Aussem, Member of the Central Executive Committee for all Ukraine, and also the plenipotentiary of the Government of the Socialist Soviet Republic of White Russia, the Socialist Soviet Republic of Georgia, the Socialist Soviet Republic of Azerbaijan, the Socialist Soviet Republic of Armenia, and the Republic of the Far East, namely Herr Nikolaus Krestinski, plenipotentiary and Ambassador of the Russian Socialist Soviet Republic in Berlin; having communicated their full powers, which were found in good and due form, agreed to the following provisions:

Article 1

The Treaty signed at Rapallo, on 16 April 1922, between the German Reich and the Russian Socialist Soviet Republic shall apply, mutatis mutandis, to the relations between the German Reich, on the one hand, and;

[1] the Socialist Soviet Republic of Ukraine;

[2] the Socialist Soviet Republic of White Russia;

[3] the Socialist Soviet Republic of Georgia;

[4] the Socialist Soviet Republic of Azerbaijan;

[5] the Socialist Soviet Republic of Armenia, and;

[6] the Republic of the Far East, — hereinafter referred to as States allied the R S F S R — on the other hand. As regards Article 2 of the Treaty of Rapallo, this shall be valid for the application down to 16 April 1922, of the laws and measures specified therein.

Article 2

The German Government and the Government of the Socialist Soviet Republic of Ukraine are agreed that the determination and the settlement of such claims as may have arisen in favour either of the German Government or of the Government of Ukraine since the conclusion of the state of war between Germany and Ukraine during the period in which German troops were present in Ukraine shall be reserved.

Article 3

All nationals of one of the Contracting Parties who are resident on the territory of the other Party shall enjoy complete legal protection of their persons in conformity with international law and the general laws of the country of residence.

Nationals of the German Reich who enter the territory of the States allied to the RSFSR in conformity with the passport regulations, or who are at present resident there, shall be granted inviolability in respect of all property taken with them and of all property acquired on the territory of the States allied with the RSFSR provided that the acquisition and employment of that property is in accordance with the laws of the State of residence or with specific agreements made with the competent authorities of that State. The exportation of property acquired in the State allied to the RSFSR shall, unless otherwise provided for in special agreements, be governed by the laws and regulations of the State allied to the RSFSR.

Article 4

The Governments of the States allied with the RSFSR shall be entitled to establish, at places in Germany where they have diplomatic representatives or one of their consular agents, national trade offices which shall have the same legal status as the Russian trade delegation in Germany. In this case they shall recognise as binding upon themselves all legal acts performed either by the director of their trade office or by officials invested by him with full powers, provided that such officials act in accordance with the full powers granted to them.

Article 5

In order to facilitate economic relations between the German Reich on the one hand, and the States allied with the RSFSR on the other hand, the following principles have been laid down:

[1] All agreements concluded between nationals of the German Reich, German legal persons, or German firms on the one hand, and the Governments of the States allied with the RSFSR, or their national trade offices mentioned in Article 4, or individuals, legal persons, or firms belonging to those states, on the other hand, and also the economic effects of such agreements, shall be dealt with according to the laws of the State in which they were concluded and shall be subject to the jurisdiction of that State. This provision shall not apply to agreements which were concluded before the coming into force of the present Treaty.

[2] The agreements mentioned under [1] may contain an arbitration clause. Provision may also be made in such agreements for bringing them under the jurisdiction of one of the contracting States.

Article 6

The States allied with the RSFSR shall allow persons who possessed German nationality but have since lost it, and also their wives and children, to leave the country, provided that proof is forthcoming that they are transferring their residence to Germany.

Article 7

The delegations of both Parties and all persons employed in connection therewith shall refrain from any agitation or propaganda against the Government and national institutions of the country in which they reside.

Article 8

This Treaty may, as regards the above Articles 3 to 6, and also as regards the corresponding application of Article 4 of the Treaty of Rapallo, be denounced on three months notice being given.

Such denunciation may be notified by Germany to any one of the States allied with the RSFSR to take effect only for her relations with that State and, conversely, by any one of these States to Germany, to take effect only for relations between that single State and Germany.

If the Treaty thus denounced is not replaced by a commercial treaty, the Governments concerned shall be entitled, on the expiration of the period of notice, to appoint a commission of five members for the purpose of liquidating such business transactions as have already been commenced. The members of the commission shall be regarded as representatives of a nondiplomatic character and shall liquidate all transactions at the latest within six months after the expiry of this Treaty.

Article 9

This Treaty shall be ratified. Special instruments of ratification shall be exchanged between Germany on the one hand, and each one of the States allied with the RSFSR on the other hand. Immediately the exchange is made, the Treaty shall enter into force as between the States taking part in the exchange.

Done on 5 November 1922

Signed: Maltzan

Signed: W. Aussem

Signed: N. Krestinski

== Legacy ==
Over the next century, the term "Rapallo" came to have very different lessons for different groups of concerned observers and scholars. In Britain and France and the smaller nations of Europe, it became the symbol of a sinister German–Soviet conspiracy to control Europe, a theory underscored by the 1939 Molotov–Ribbentrop Pact, a non-aggression pact between Nazi Germany and the Soviet Union and a key event in the run-up to the outbreak of the Second World War in Europe.

For Germany, “Rapallo” symbolized a hopeful independent foreign policy of cleverly playing off Eastern and Western Europe so that the defeated nation could escape harsh repression. For the Soviet Union, “Rapallo” was the first great Communist diplomatic triumph, showed how the weaker nation could use pacifism to outmanoeuvre bourgeois enemies and gave the underdog regime an opportunity for normal diplomatic and commercial relations while it secretly built up military prowess.

== See also ==
- International relations (1919–1939)
- Germany–Soviet Union relations, 1918–1941
- Treaty of Berlin (August 27, 1918)
