= Fokker D.XIII =

1920s Dutch fighter aircraft

D.XIII
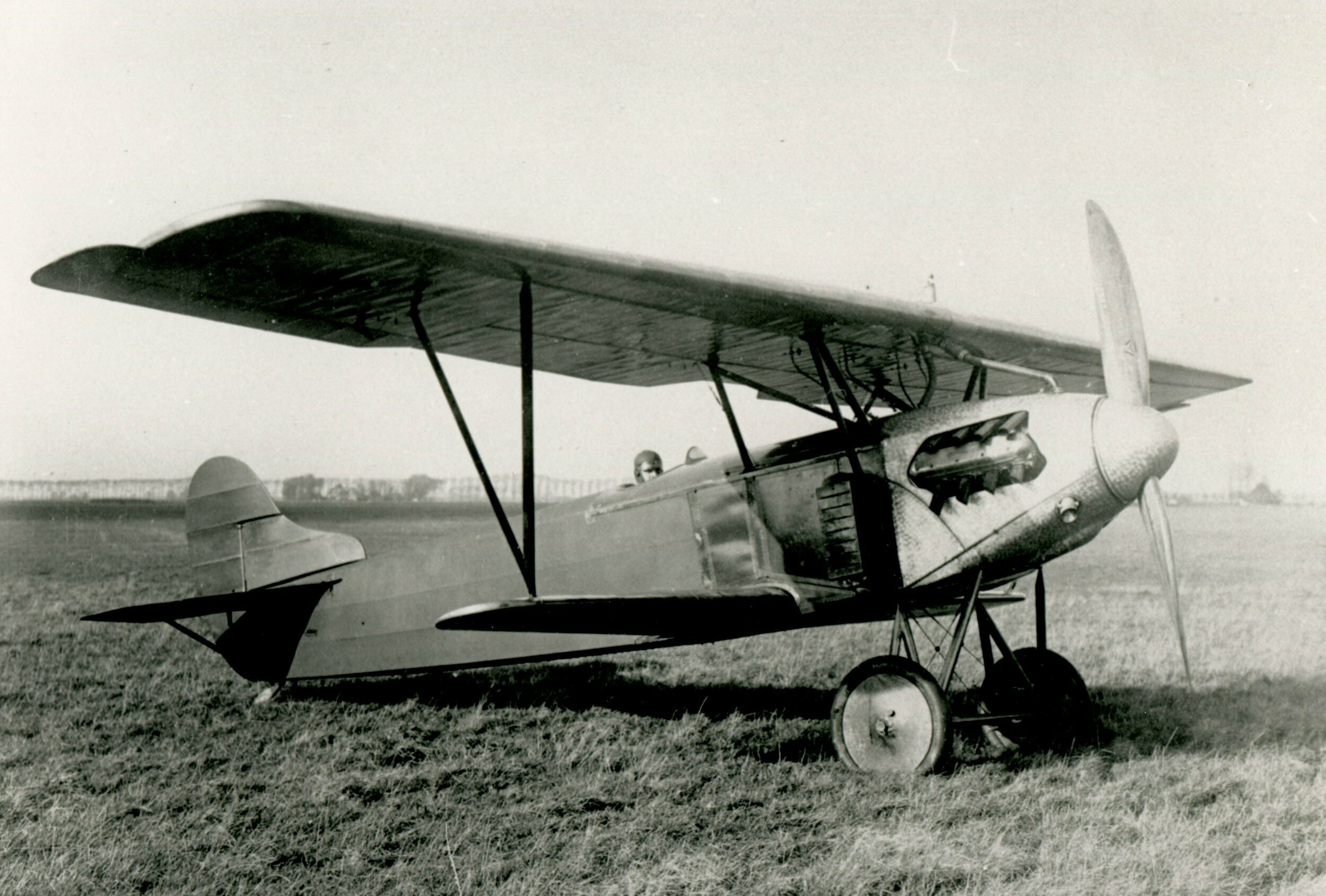

General information
- Type: Fighter
- Manufacturer: Fokker
- Primary user: Reichswehr
- Number built: 53

History
- First flight: 12 September 1924

The Fokker D.XIII was a fighter aircraft produced in the Netherlands in the mid-1920s. It was a development of the Fokker D.XI with a new powerplant and considerably refined aerodynamics, and had been designed to meet the requirements of the clandestine flying school operated by the German Army at Lipetsk in the Soviet Union. Like its predecessor, it was a conventional single-bay sesquiplane with staggered wings braced by V-struts. The pilot sat in an open cockpit and the undercarriage was of fixed, tailskid type. The wings were made of wood and skinned with plywood, and the fuselage was built up of welded steel tube with fabric covering.

On 16 July 1925, one of the early examples of a production aircraft was used to set four new world airspeed records: the airspeed record for carrying a 500 kg/1,102 lb payload (265.7 km/h or 165.7 mph), the record for carrying the same payload over a distance of 200 km (264.2 km/h or 164.7 mph), at the same time setting the same records for carrying a 250 kg (551 lb) payload.

Under the cover of a fictitious order from Argentina, the German Army purchased 50 aircraft and arranged to have them transported to Lipetsk via Stettin and Leningrad. There, they equipped the flying school throughout its existence until the German abandonment of the programme in 1933. At that point, the 30 remaining aircraft (including two that had been purchased separately from the original batch) were handed over to the Soviet Air Force.

== Operators ==
Weimar Republic

- Reichswehr
  - Wissenschaftliche Versuchs- und Prüfanstalt für Luftfahrzeuge, Lipetsk

Soviet Union

- Soviet Air Force

== Specifications ==
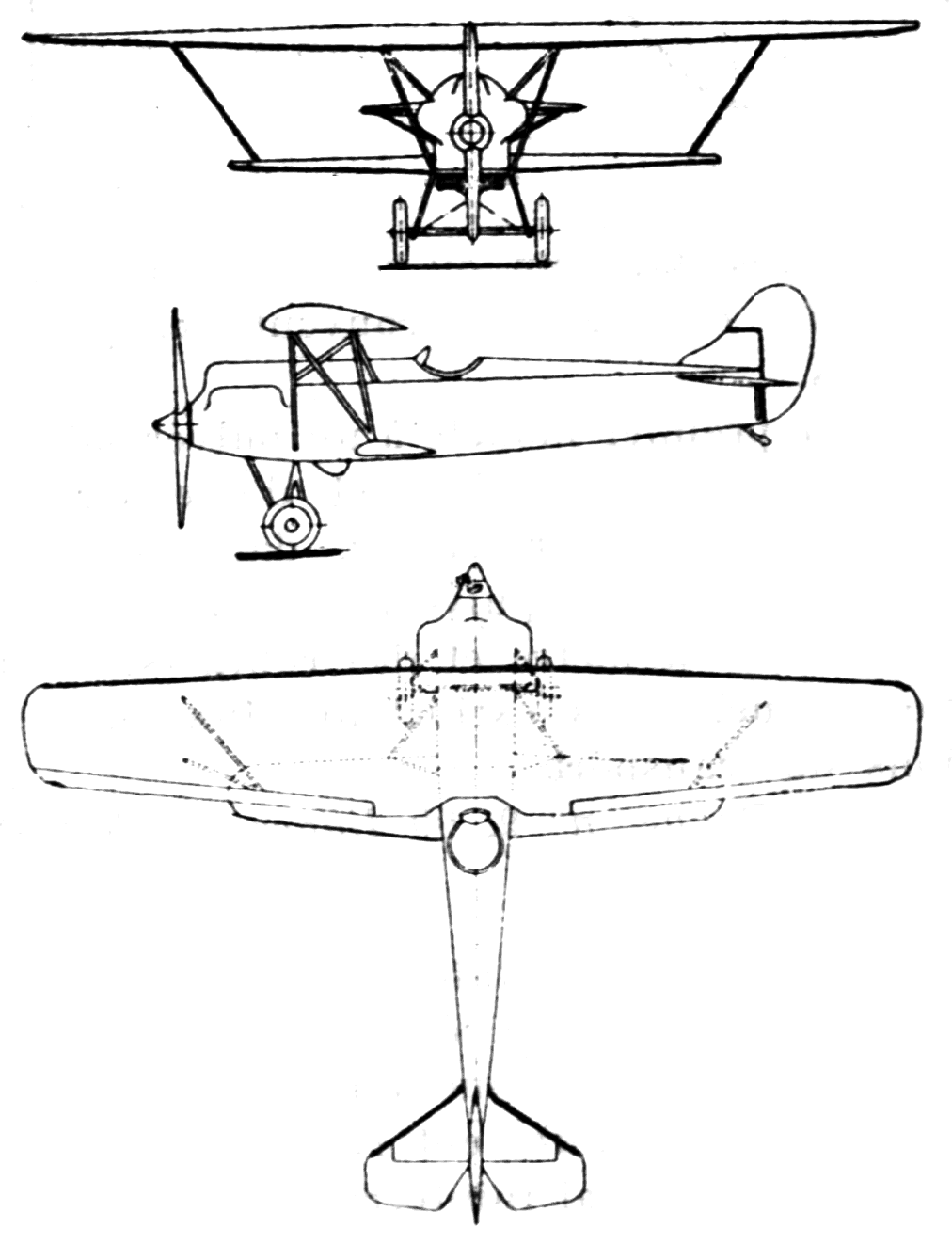
Fokker D.XIII 3-view drawing from Le Document aéronautique October,1926

General characteristics

- Crew: One pilot
- Length: 7.90 m (25 ft 11 in)
- Wingspan: 11.00 m (36 ft 1 in)
- Height: 2.90 m (9 ft 6 in)
- Wing area: 21.5 m^{2} (231 sq ft)
- Empty weight: 1,220 kg (2,690 lb)
- Gross weight: 1,650 kg (3,640 lb)
- Powerplant: 1 × Napier Lion XI , 425 kW (570 hp)

Performance

- Maximum speed: 270 km/h (170 mph, 150 kn)
- Range: 600 km (380 mi, 330 nmi)
- Service ceiling: 8,000 m (26,250 ft)
- Rate of climb: 9.8 m/s (1,930 ft/min)

Armament

- 2 × fixed, forward-firing 7.92 mm (.312 in) LMG 08/15 machine guns in forward fuselage
