= Yakov Moiseevich Fishman =

Russian revolutionary and politician

Yakov Moiseevich Fishman (Russian: Яков Моисеевич Фишман, 1887 - July 12, 1961), was a Russian revolutionary and politician, previously a leader of the Left Socialist Revolutionary Party who participated in the assassination of the German ambassador Wilhelm von Mirbach in 1918 and later, the anti-Bolshevik Left SR uprising. During the Russian Civil War, he joined the Russian Communist Party and played a key role in establishing the chemical and biological warfare capabilities of the Soviet Union, becoming a member of the All-Russian Central Executive Committee. He also went to Italy and Germany as a Soviet intelligence officer and oversaw the Tomka gas test site in cooperation with Weimar Germany.

In August 1925, he was appointed the first head of the Red Army's Military-Chemical Directorate (Voenno-khimicheskoe upravlenie, abbreviated to VOKhIMU). In 1926, at a small laboratory controlled by VOKhIMU, Fishman initiated research on Bacillus anthracis (the causative agent of anthrax). In February 1928, Fishman prepared a key report for Kliment Efremovich Voroshilov (the People's Commissar for Military and Navy Affairs and Chairman of the USSR's Revolutionary Military Council) on the Soviet Union's preparedness for biological warfare. It asserted that "the bacterial option could be successfully used in war" and proposed a plan for the organisation of Soviet military bacteriology.

He became a Doctor of Chemical Sciences (1936) and a Major General of the Technical Troops (1955).
