= Kama tank school =

Secret training school for tank commanders operated by Germany

The Kama tank school (German: Panzerschule Kama) was a secret training school for tank commanders operated by the German Reichswehr near Kazan, Soviet Union. It operated from 1929 to 1933. The school was established in order to allow the German military to circumvent the military restrictions on tank research spelled out in the Treaty of Versailles. Apart from Kama, for the same reason Germany also operated the Lipetsk fighter-pilot school (1926–33) and a gas warfare facility, Gas-Testgelände Tomka (1928–31).

Following the Nazi party's rise to power, the school was closed and Germany's Tank Force and Air Force were trained in Germany.

It was codenamed "Kama" from the words Kazan and Malbrandt because the testing grounds were near Kazan and Oberstleutnant Malbrandt was assigned to select the location for testing.

== Background ==
The Treaty of Versailles, signed on 28 June 1919, prohibited Germany from operating any form of tank or air force after the country had lost the First World War. Germany had normalised its relations with the Soviet Union in 1922, with the signing of the Treaty of Rapallo.

Initially, Germany was unwilling to break the Treaty of Versailles. This attitude changed however in 1923, when French and Belgian troops occupied the Ruhr area after Germany defaulted on its payments of war reparations. In December 1926, Germany and the Soviet Union signed an agreement to establish a tank school on Soviet territory. The school was eventually opened in 1929 and served to train approximately 30 German tank specialists.

== School operations ==
After its opening, the school accommodated up to a dozen German officers at a time, training there for up to two years. Apart from training officers, the school served German companies like Krupp, Daimler, and Rheinmetall as a development ground for new tank designs. Technicians worked on the designs that later became the Panzerkampfwagen I and II.

Many of the officers training, instructing or visiting Kama later became high-ranking commanders in the Wehrmacht or its Panzerwaffe, among them Ernst Volckheim, Werner von Blomberg, Walter Model, Wilhelm Ritter von Thoma, Heinz Guderian and Josef Harpe. However claims about training of Guderian are contested: allegedly, he visited Kama only once, as a member of inspection.

It is claimed that a number of Soviet tank officers were also trained there. However from the declassified German and Soviet documents one may conclude that the Soviet officers were mainly observers or assistants.

== Closure ==
In the early 1930s, the political situation for the tank school began to change. The Soviet Union opened itself to the West while Germany attempted a closer approach to France.

In December 1932, Germany achieved being viewed as an equal at the Geneva Conference, making the secret schools somewhat unnecessary. With the rise of the Nazis to power in January 1933, the ideological gap between fascist Germany and the communist Soviet Union became too large and the tank school at Kazan was closed in late 1933.

== See also ==
- Lipetsk fighter-pilot school
- Tomka gas test site
