= Tomka gas test site =

Covert joint Soviet-German chemical weapons research facility, operational 1926-1933

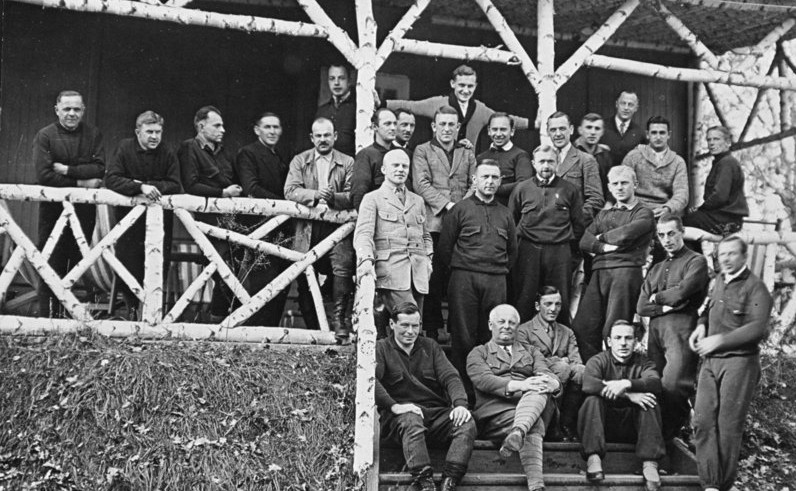
German staff at Tomka chemical weapons facility, 1928

Tomka gas test site (German: Gas-Testgelände Tomka) was a secret chemical weapons testing facility near a place codenamed Volsk-18 (Wolsk, in German literature), 20 km off Volsk, now Shikhany, Saratov Oblast, Russia created within the framework of German-Soviet military cooperation to circumvent the demilitarization provisions of the post-World War I Treaty of Versailles. It was co-directed by Yakov Moiseevich Fishman (начальник военно-химического управления Красной Армии), and German chemists Alexander von Grundherr and Ludwig von Sicherer. It operated (according to an agreement undersigned by fictitious joint stock companies) during 1926-1933.

After 1933 the area was used by the Red Army and expanded under the name "Volsk-18" or "Schichany-2" to Russia's most important center for the development of chemical warfare agents and protective measures against NBC weapons.

Another chemical site was established by the settlement of Ukhtomsky, Moscow Region.

== See also ==
- Kama tank school
- Lipetsk fighter-pilot school
