= Lipetsk fighter-pilot school =

Covert joint Soviet-German military flight school, operational 1926-1933

Coordinates: 52.6122°N 39.5847°E

The Lipetsk fighter-pilot school (German: Kampffliegerschule Lipezk), also known as WIWUPAL from its German codename Wissenschaftliche Versuchs- und Personalausbildungsstation "Scientific Experimental and Personnel Training Station", was a secret training school for fighter pilots operated by the German Reichswehr at Lipetsk, Soviet Union, because Germany was prohibited by the Treaty of Versailles from operating an air force and sought alternative means to continue training and development for the future Luftwaffe. It is now the site of Lipetsk air base.

== Background ==
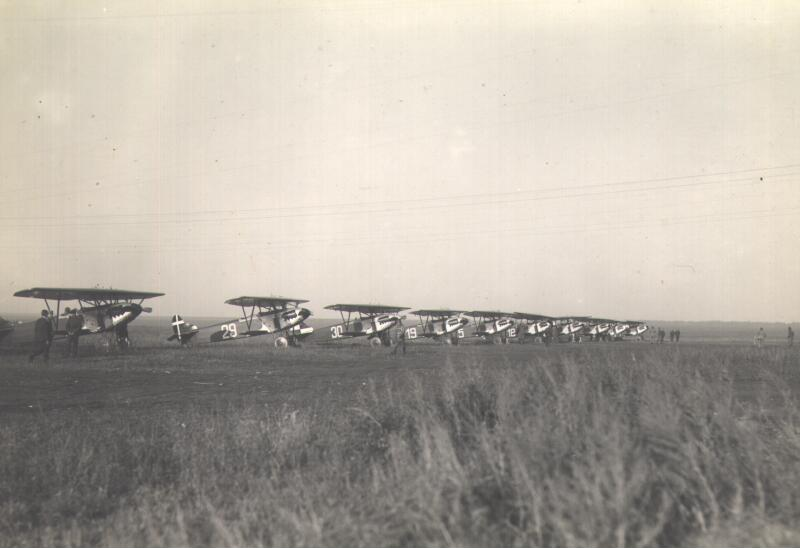
Fokker D.XIII at Lipetsk

The Treaty of Versailles, signed on 28 June 1919, prohibited Germany from operating any form of air force after the country had lost the First World War. Initially, it also prohibited the production and import of any form of aircraft to the country. In 1922, the clause on civilian aircraft was dropped and Germany was able to produce planes again, followed in 1923 with the country regaining control of its airspace. The operation or production of aircraft for military means was however still prohibited.

The German military, the Reichswehr, was well aware of the value of air warfare and was determined not to fall too far behind in knowledge and training. For this purpose alternative means, outside Germany, were explored.

Germany had normalised its relations with Soviet Russia in 1922, with the signing of the Treaty of Rapallo. At the time, both countries were outcasts in the world community.

Initially, Germany was unwilling to break the Treaty of Versailles. This attitude changed however in 1923, when French and Belgian troops occupied the Ruhr area after Germany defaulted on reparations payments. In light of the events of the Ruhrkampf, the German Army ordered 100 new aircraft from Fokker in the Netherlands, among them 50 newly developed Fokker D.XIIIs. Additionally, the German Navy had also ordered a small number of planes.

With the end of the Ruhrkampf in September, Germany was at a loss as to how to utilize the planes which were due for delivery in 1924. The Soviet Union was approached and showed an interest in allowing Germany to develop aircraft in the country; the German manufacturer Junkers had already been operating a production facility for military aircraft near Moscow since 1923.

In June 1924, retired Colonel Hermann von der Lieth-Thomsen became a permanent representative of the Reichswehr's Truppenamt, the secret General Staff of the German Army, in Moscow. At the same time, seven German instructors were sent to the Red Air Force. On 15 April 1925, Lieth-Thomsen signed a contract to establish a German fighter-pilot school at Lipetsk.

== Fighter school ==
Extensive works were required at Lipetsk to prepare for the German fighter-pilot school, Lipetsk Air Base. It operated from 1926 to 1933. In June 1925, the base was ready for flight operations but training of German pilots was only possible from spring 1926 onwards. The new school, up until its closure, trained 120 fighter pilots, over 300 ground personnel and 450 administrative and training staff, who, in turn, were able to serve as instructors when the new German Luftwaffe was formed in 1935. The facilities were also used to train Soviet pilots and to develop new bombing targeting methods. In an average summer, 140 German personnel were at Lipetsk, a number that was reduced to 40 in winter. Additionally, 340 Soviet personnel were employed, with an annual budget of 4 million Reichsmark (equivalent to 15 million 2021 €) at its high-point in 1929. The disguise German name for the facility, abbreviated with the WIWUPAL contraction, was the Wissenschaftliche Versuchs-und Prüfanstalt für Luftfahrzeuge (Scientific Research and Test Institute for Aircraft).

In addition to the school at Lipetsk, Germany operated a tank school, the Panzerschule Kama (1926–33) and a gas warfare facility, Gas-Testgelände Tomka (1928–31) in the Soviet Union.

== Closure ==
In the early 1930s, the political situation for the flight school began to change. The Soviet Union opened itself to the West while Germany attempted a closer approach to France. Additionally, the Soviets were unhappy about the lack of development carried out at the school.

In December 1932, Germany achieved being viewed as an equal at the Geneva Conference, making the fighter school somewhat unnecessary. With the rise of the Nazis to power in January 1933, the ideological gap between fascist Germany and the communist Soviet Union became too large and the fighter school at Lipetsk was closed on 15 September 1933.

== In popular culture ==
The fighter school at Lipetsk is referenced in the German crime drama series Babylon Berlin, Season 2.

== See also ==
- Kama tank school
- Tomka gas test site
