= Moscow Armistice =

1944 peace treaty between the USSR and Finland which ended the Continuation War

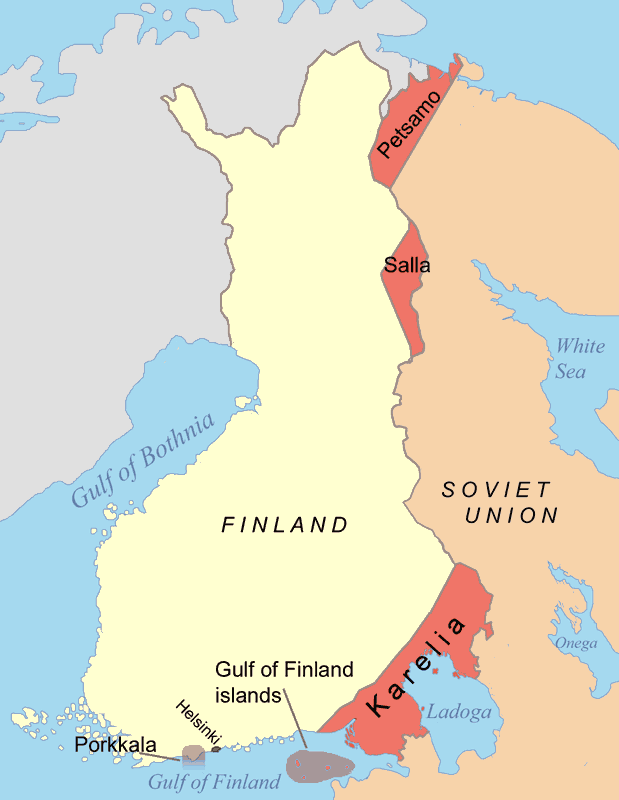
- The areas ceded by Finland to the Soviet Union after the Continuation War. Porkkala was returned to Finland in 1956.
- Type: Bilateral treaty
- Signed: 19 September 1944
- Location: Moscow, Russian SFSR, USSR
- Parties: Soviet Union; United Kingdom; Finland
- Ratifiers: Soviet Union; United Kingdom; Finland

The Moscow Armistice was signed between Finland on one side and the Soviet Union and United Kingdom on the other side on 19 September 1944, ending the Continuation War. The Armistice restored the Moscow Peace Treaty of 1940, with a number of modifications.

The final peace treaty between Finland and many of the Allies was signed in Paris in 1947.

== Conditions for peace ==
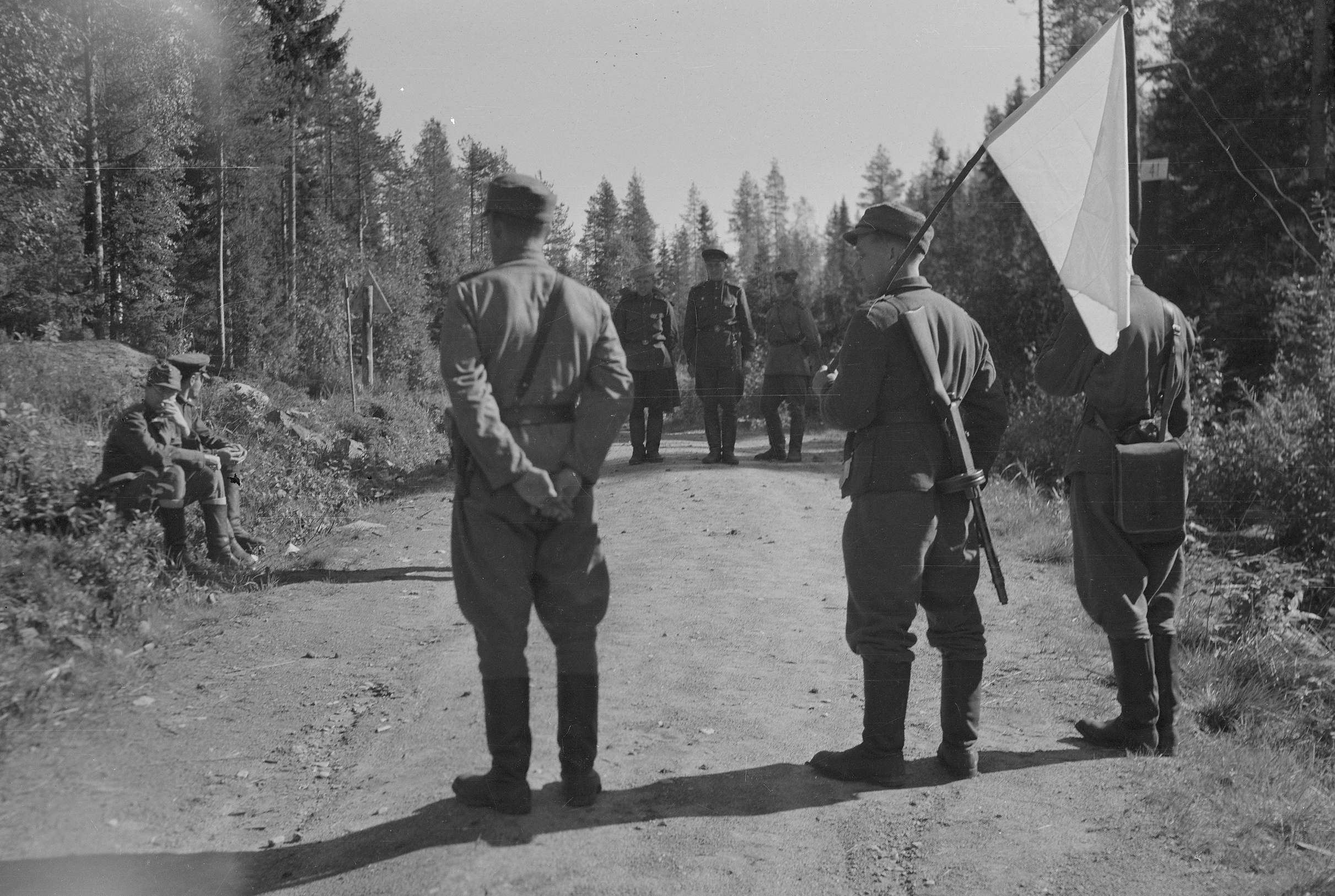
Finnish and Soviet officers gather for negotiations on September 5, 1944

The conditions for peace were similar to what had been agreed in the Moscow Peace Treaty of 1940: Finland was obliged to cede parts of Karelia and Salla, as well as certain islands in the Gulf of Finland. The new armistice also handed all of Petsamo to the Soviet Union, and Finland was further compelled to lease Porkkala to the Soviet Union for a period of fifty years (the area was returned to Finnish control in 1956). Territories ceded to the Soviet Union constituted approximately 11.50% (44,106.23 km^{2}) of Finland's territory (382,561.23 km^{2}) prior to the Winter War and the Continuation War as dictated by the Treaty of Tartu.

Other conditions included Finnish payment of nearly $300,000,000 ($5.4 billion in today's US dollars) in the form of various commodities over six years to the Soviet Union as war reparations. Finland also agreed to legalise the Communist Party of Finland (after it had made some changes to the party rules) and ban parties that the Soviet Union considered fascist. Further, the individuals that the Soviets considered responsible for the war had to be arrested and put on trial, the best-known case being that of Risto Ryti. The armistice compelled Finland to drive German troops from its territory, leading to a military campaign in Lapland.

== Surrendered territory ==
Municipalities annexed by the Soviet Union
Municipality of Finland	Russian Cyrillic name	km^{2}	Sq miles	Part of present-day populated place in Russia	Notes
Antrea	Каменногорск	486.4	302.23	Kamennogorsk	
Harlu	Харлу	252.6	156.96	Kharlu	
Heinjoki	Хейнйоки	342.1	212.57	Veshchevo	
Hiitola	Хийтола	464	288.32	Khiytola	
Impilahti	Импилахти	904	561.72	Impilahti	
Jaakkima	Яккима	501.9	311.87	Yakkima	
Johannes	Советский	217.6	135.21	Sovetsky	
Kanneljärvi	Победа	246.3	153.04	Pobeda	
Kaukola	Севастьяново	293.7	182.5	Sevastyanovo	
Kirvu	Свободное	695.22	432	Svobodnoye	
Kivennapa	Первомайское	650.52	404.21	Pervomayskoye	
Koivisto	Койвистон	283.1	175.91	Primorsk	
Kuolemajärvi	Пионерское	400	248.55	Pionerskoye	
Kurkijoki	Куркийоки	539.5	335.23	Kurkiyoki	
Käkisalmi	Какисалмен	188.54	117.15	Priozersk	
Lumivaara	Лумиваара	292.4	181.69	Lakhdenpokhsky District	
Metsäpirtti	Метсапиртти	186.9	116.13	Zaporozhskoye	
Muolaa	Муолаа	750.02	466.04	Pravdino	
Petsamo	Печенгский	10,470	6,505.76	Pechengsky District	
Pyhäjärvi	Пюхаярви	522	324.35	Otradnoye	
Rautu	Рауту	339.6	211.02	Sosnovo	
Ruskeala	Рускеала	519	322.49	Ruskeala	
Räisälä	Райсала	492.95	306.30	Melnikovo	
Sakkola	Саккола	349.4	217.11	Gromovo	
Salmi	Салми	1,423	884.21	Salmi	
Soanlahti	Соанлахти	504	313.17	Suoyarvsky District	
Sortavala	Сортавалан	690.88	429.3	Sortavala	
Suistamo	Суистамо	1,623.80	1,009	Suoyarvsky District	
Suojärvi	Суоярви	3,688.40	2,292	Suoyarvsky District	
Terijoki	Терийоки	122.42	76.07	Zelenogorsk	
Uusikirkko	Уусикиркко	641.70	398.73	Polyany	
Valkjärvi	Валкъярви	400	248.55	Michurinskoye	
Viipuri	Выборг	613.93	381.48	Vyborg	
Vuoksela	Вуоксела	135	83.88	Vuoksela	
Vuoksenranta	Вуоксенранта	300.22	186.55	Ozyorskoye	
Äyräpää	Эуряпяя	205.7	127.82	Baryshevo	

== See also ==
- Moscow Peace Treaty of 1940
- Allied Control Commission (Finland)
- Finlandization
- Armistice between Italy and Allied armed forces
- Bulgarian coup d'état of 1944
- King Michael's Coup
- Karelian question, contemporary debate on the status of the ceded territories
