= Expedition to Vyborg =

- Part of the Russo-Swedish War (1554-1557)
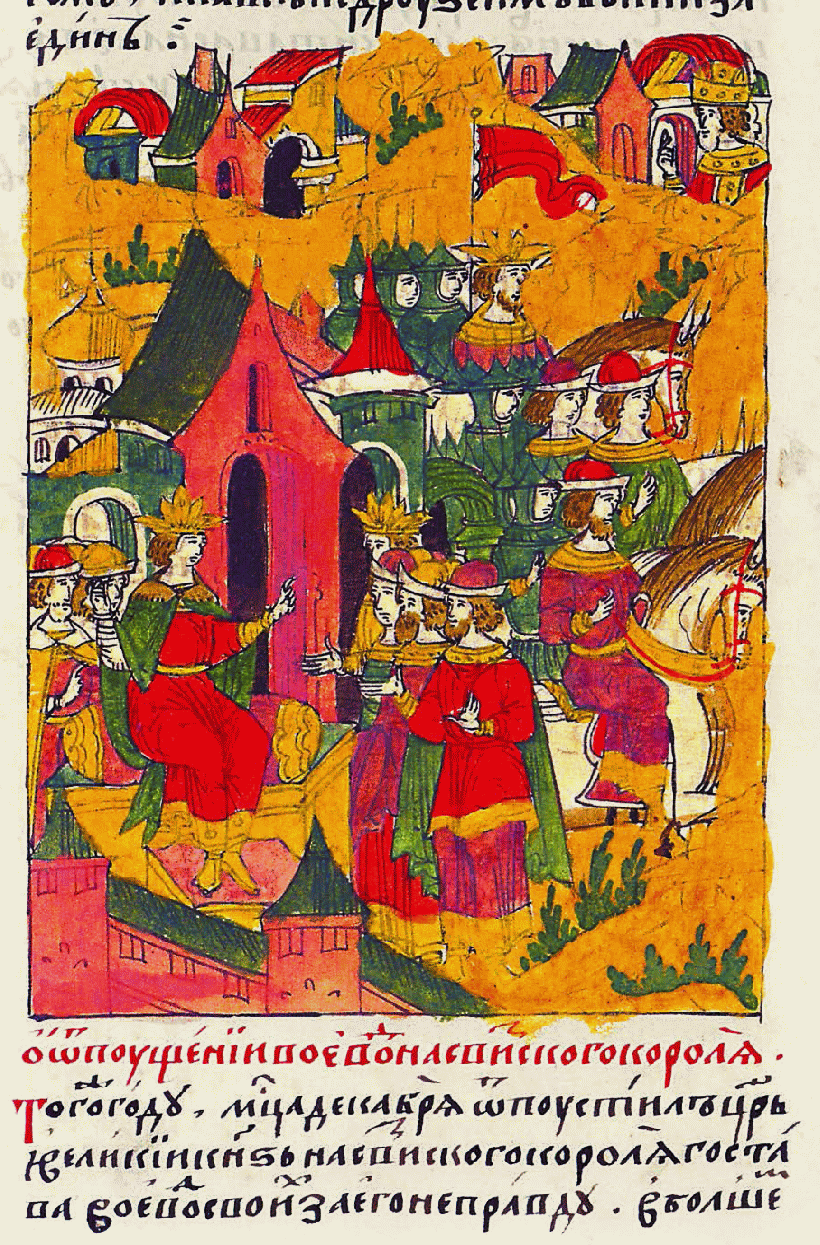
- Ivan Vasilyevich "releases his voivodes to the King of Sweden" Illustrated Chronicle of Ivan the Terrible
Date	26 December 1555 – February 1556
Location	Neighbourhood of Vyborg and Vuoksi, Sweden (Present-day Russia and Finland)
Result	Russian victory

Belligerents
Tsardom of Russia	Kingdom of Sweden

Commanders and leaders
Pyotr Schenyatev; Dmitry Paletsky; Ivan Sheremetyev (WIA)	Jakob Bagge

Strength
5,000 to 25,000	Unknown, but less

The Expedition to Vyborg was a major military campaign undertaken by the Russians in winter of 1556. The main goal of the expedition was to inflict as much material and human damage on Swedish forces as possible, which would compel Stockholm to request a truce.

A new Russo-Swedish war started over border disputes began in 1554. Already in early 1555, the Russians were defeated at the fortress of Kivinebb by local militias. A major Swedish expedition aimed at capturing Oreshek was also unsuccessful. By the end of 1555, Ivan the Terrible decided to end the military actions, and sent large forces on a punitive expedition to southern Finland. The Russian offensive proved successful. Significant trophies were captured and numerous prisoners were taken. After the success of this expedition, the Swedish King Gustav Vasa requested an armistice.

== Background ==
=== Prelude ===
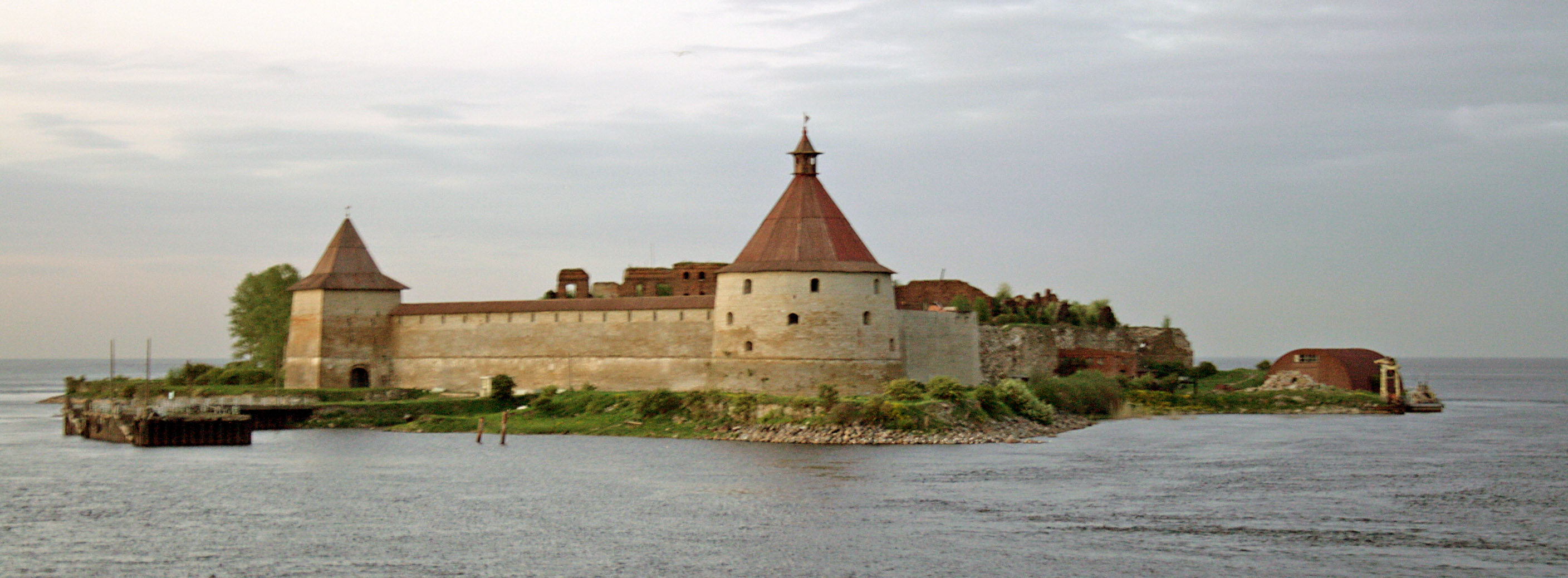
View of the Oreshek Fortress

In early 1555, the Russians invaded Finland with the aim of plundering the territory. They were opposed by Finnish peasants, who could maneuver much better on skis, taking into account their knowledge of the territory. On March 11, a battle took place, the Russian commander was killed, as a result of which the entire army became upset and began to retreat disorganized.

In the autumn, the Swedes, with 12,000 led by Jakob Bagge, invaded Russia and laid siege to Oreshek. The Russian garrison resisted, staged attacks and interfered with the siege in every possible way, besides, in Karelia, the Russians ravaged several border villages, the three-week siege ended in failure for the Swedes and they retreated with heavy casualties. The pursuit by the Russians proved unsuccessful.

=== Expedition objectives ===
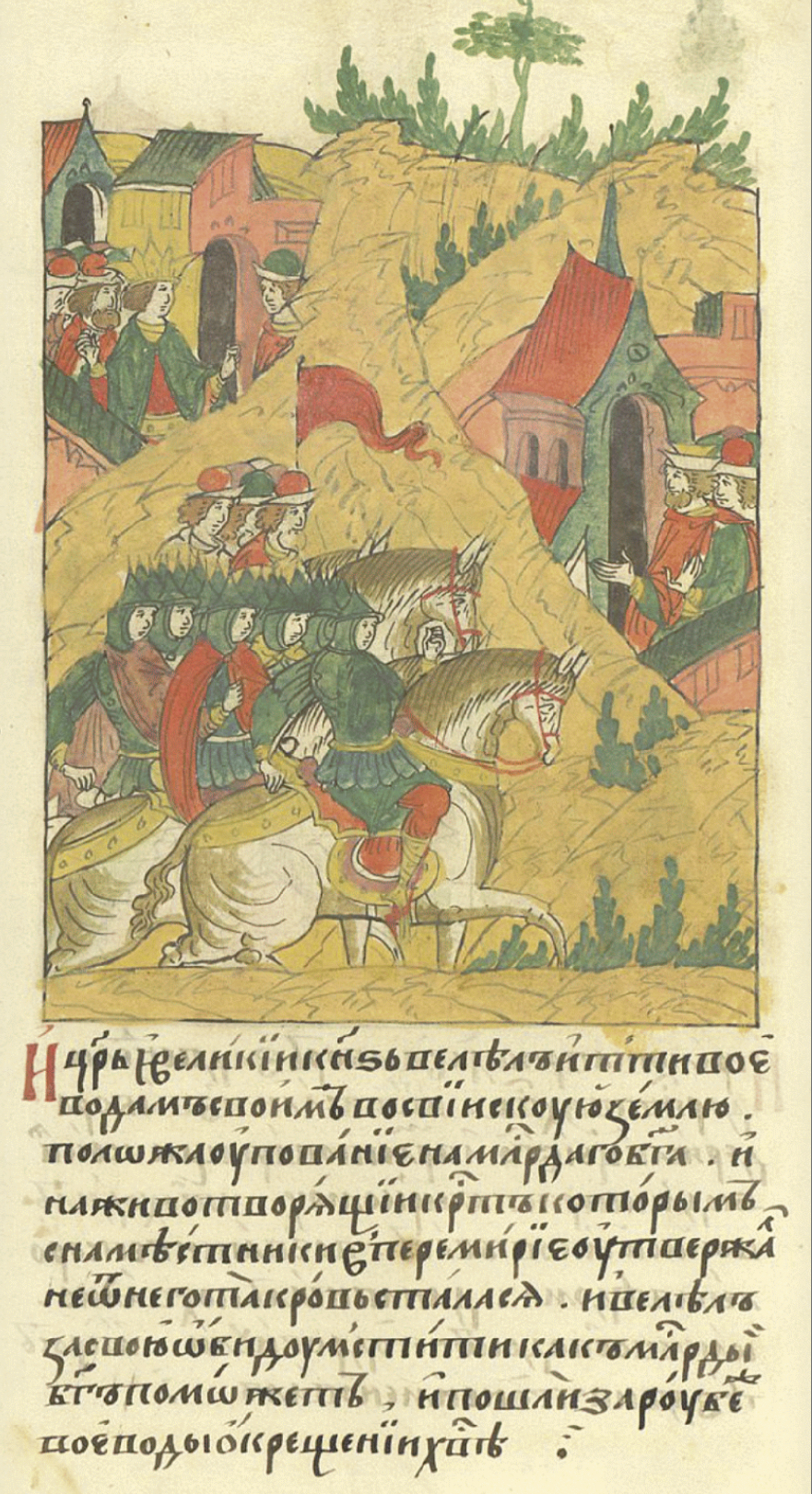
Russian voevodes march on Sweden

The Russian army had at its disposal 5,000 to 25,000 troops, who were confronted by the smaller Swedish troops, who gradually entered the battle. In total, Muscovy's troops consisted of six regiments, among which were Cossacks, "datochny people", Tatars, Boyar scions and Streltsy. This army was commanded by 8 voivodes, including two grand knyazes Pyotr Schenyatev and Dmitry Paletsky. The Russian invasion was purely punitive in nature, with no attempts to seize or hold any territory. Analysis of the Nikon Chronicle shows that there were no instructions regarding the capture of Vyborg or other major cities, which is completely different from other foreign campaigns of Russian troops, such as during the siege of Kazan (1552) or Dorpat (1558), where it was clearly stated that the city should be captured. Gustav Vasa later wrote to the Russian knyaz Mikhail Vasilevich Glinsky that the captured Muscovites had orders containing only what "you are ordered to plunder and burn". Indirect confirmation is also that, given the presence of strong artillery, the Russians did not try to storm Vyborg, although they had all the means to do so.

== Campaign ==
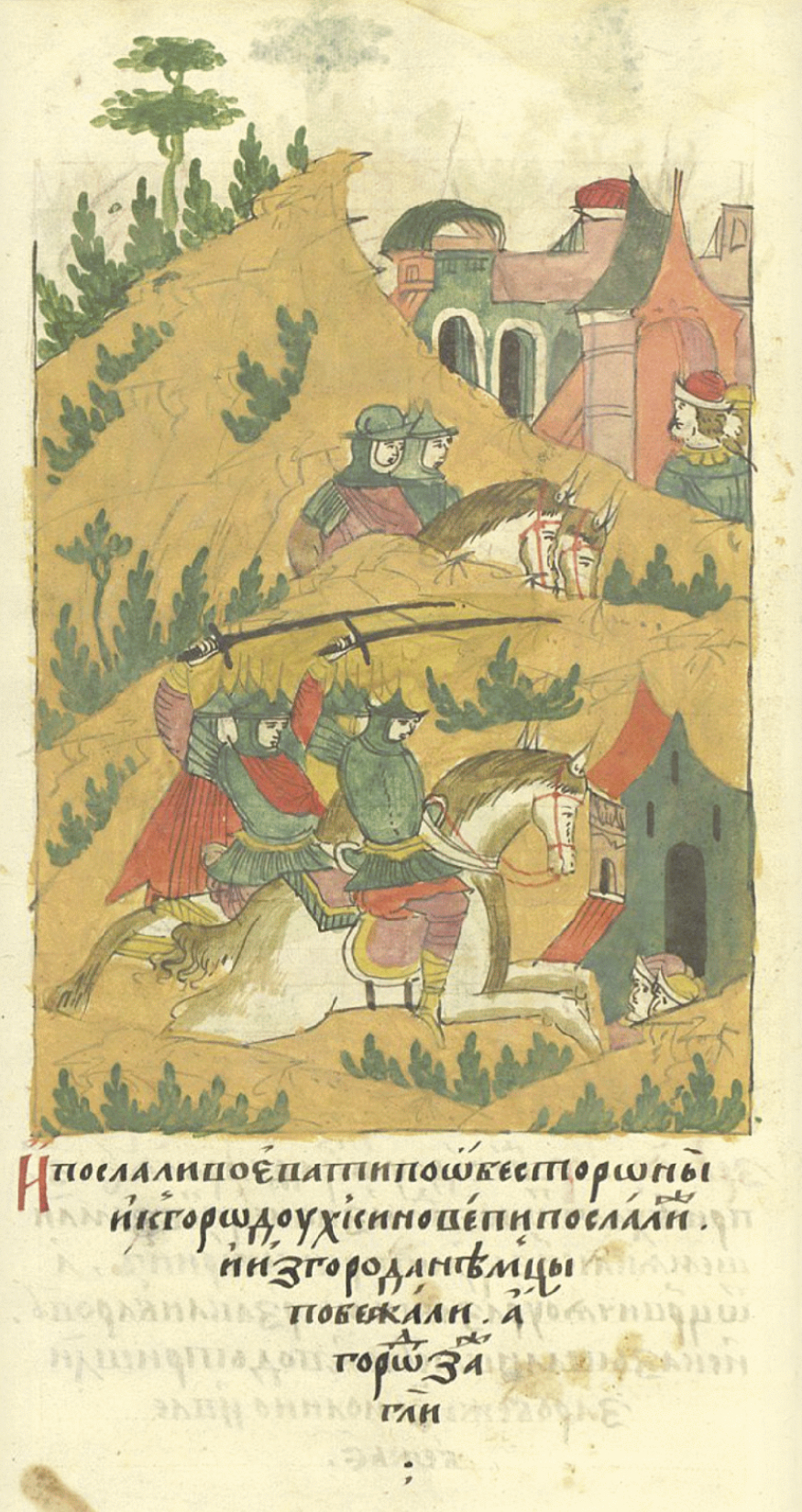
Muscovites defeat Swedes at Kivinebb

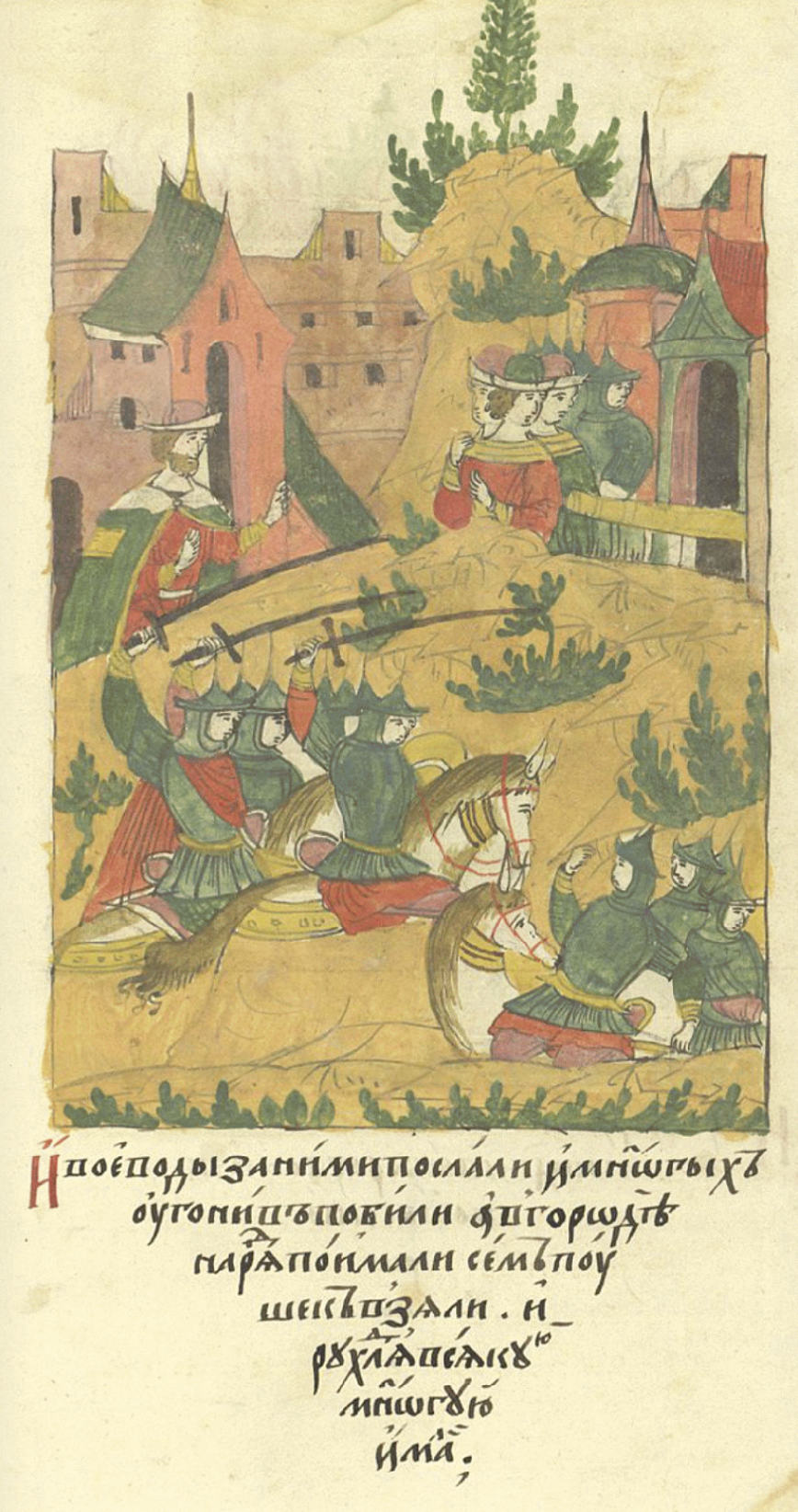
The battle between the Russians and the Swedes at Vyborg

Russians set out from Novgorod on December 26, but crossed the Swedish border only on January 20. (According to other sources, it was in early January). Russians immediately began to advance in the direction of Kivinebb, where the detachment was located, trying to stop the Russians. After a short battle, he was completely defeated. The next battle took place directly near Vyborg, where the Swedes attacked and defeated Nikita Priimkov's Yertaul regiment, however, Ivan Sheremetyev came to his aid, who forced the Swedes to retreat, carried away by the pursuit, he was ambushed and wounded, but the Tatars came to reinforce him and hit the Swedes on the flanks, turning them into a disorderly flight. After that, the Swedish forces around Vyborg acted passively. Between 85 and 115 Swedes died in this battle, and a significant number of aristocrats were captured. A detachment of 800 men came from Stockholm, but on the march they were attacked by Muscovites at the Lavretsky churchyard and defeated. The Harrison tried to make a sortie, but the Russians forced them to retreat to the fortress with artillery fire. The garrison, having suffered heavy losses, no longer interfered with the Muscovites and they went further to the Vuoksi River, where another battle took place in which the Russians won. As a result, a huge number of civilians and aristocrats were captured, and the Muscovites returned almost without losses. On the way back, the Russians completely destroyed Nishlott.

== Aftermath ==
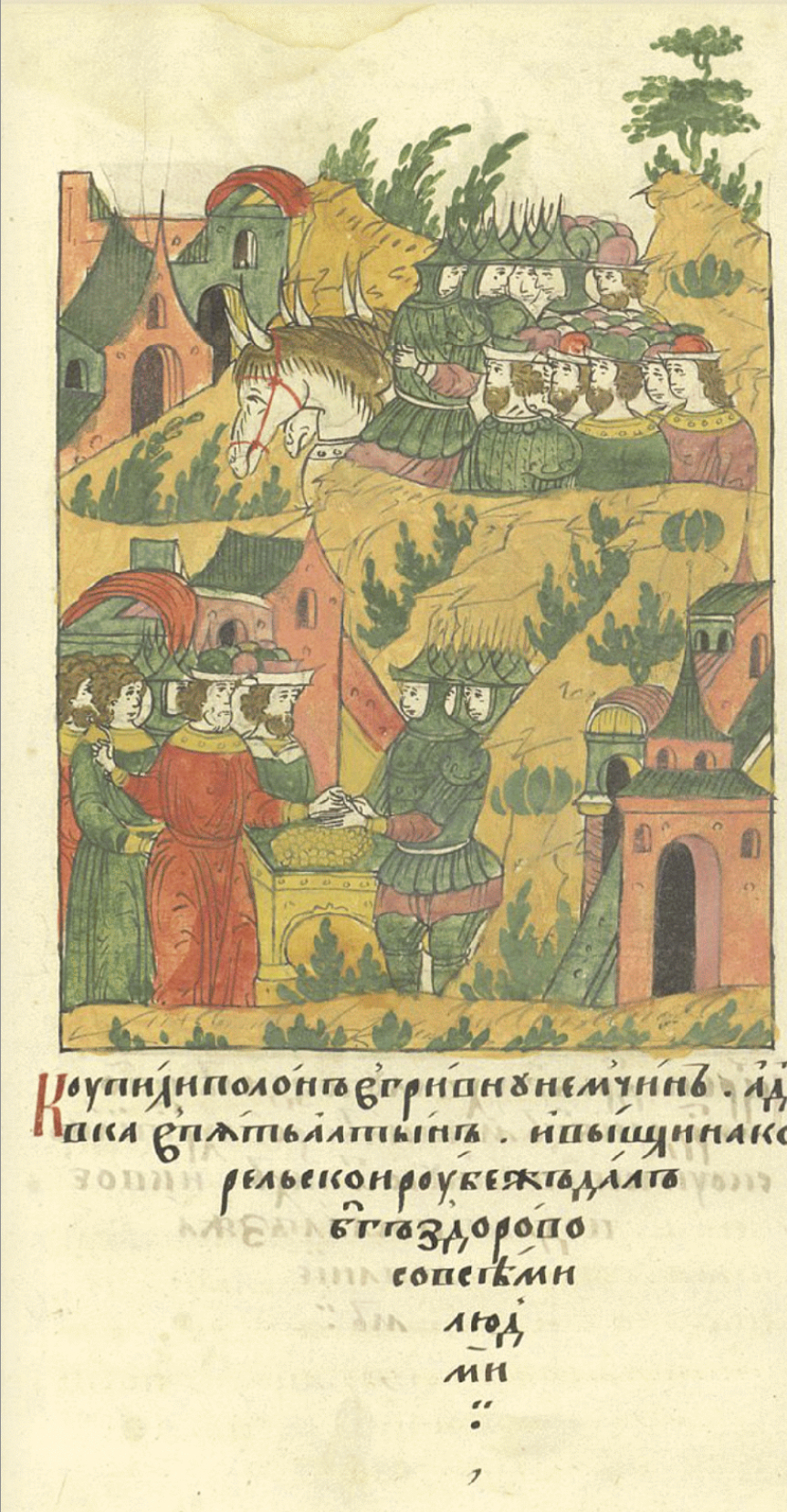
Russians sell Swedish prisoners into slavery

Russians stood near Vyborg for 3 days, and then retreated, the Swedish chronicles decided that this was due to the fact that the Russians overestimated the strength of the garrison. Moscovites probably did this because the depth of the breakthrough from Vyborg exceeded 100 versts, and the Russians were just gathering together to retreat home with a large number of prisoners. In general, the Russian campaign can be considered a success, the news of it also scared the whole of Finland and negotiations began in the summer. A messenger sent from the Swedes, a certain Knut, asked the tsar to "calm his troops and calm his anger," Ivan accepted this offer and ordered his voivodes to sign peace with the Swedes in Novgorod.
