= Lakhdenpokhsky =

Lakhdenpokhsky (masculine), Lakhdenpokhskaya (feminine), or Lakhdenpokhskoye (neuter) may refer to:

- Lakhdenpokhsky District, a district of the Republic of Karelia, Russia
- Lakhdenpokhskoye Urban Settlement, a municipal formation which the town of Lakhdenpokhya and the station of Yakkima in Lakhdenpokhsky District of the Republic of Karelia, Russia are incorporated as
