= Sevastyanovo =

Sevastyanovo may refer to:

- Sevastyanovo, Leningrad Oblast, a settlement in Leningrad Oblast, Russia
- Sevastyanovo, Vologda Oblast, a village in Vologda Oblast, Russia
