= Elisenvaara =

Elisenvaara Элисенваара
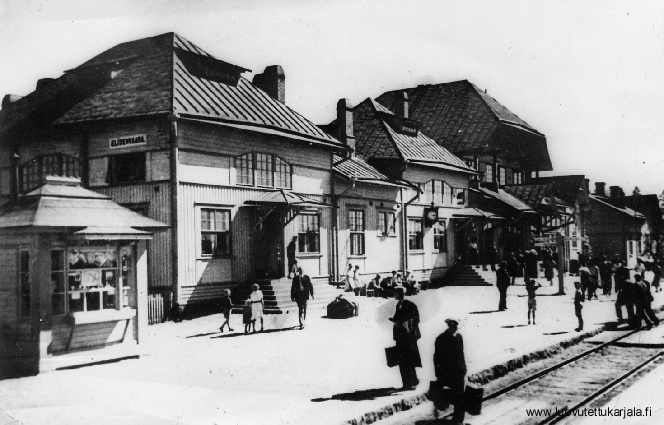
- The old railway station, constructed around 1893, was destroyed in the Winter War.
- Interactive map of Elisenvaara
- Location of Elisenvaara Elisenvaara (Karelia)
- Coordinates: 61°24′38″N 29°45′52″E
- Country: Russia
- Federal subject: Republic of Karelia
- Administrative district: Lakhdenpokhsky District

Population (2010 Census)
  - Total: 720
  - Estimate (2021): 576 (−20%)

Municipal status
  - Municipal district: Lakhdenpokhsky Municipal District
  - Capital of: Elisenvaarskoye Rural Settlement
- Time zone: UTC+3 (UTC+03:00)
- Postal code: 186720
- OKTMO ID: 86618450101

Elisenvaara (Russian: Элисенваара; Finnish: Elisenvaara) is a settlement in Lakhdenpokhsky District of the Republic of Karelia, Russia, and an important station of the Viipuri-Joensuu railroad. The station is also linked by railway to Savonlinna, Finland. The settlement has an approximate population of 686 people.

== History ==
Elisenvaara was first mentioned as a village within the pogost of Kurkiyoki in 1590.

The settlement grew around the railroad junction, with railroad connections to Viipuri, Sortavala, Lappeenranta and Savonlinna. In 1940, in the Moscow Armistice, Finnish Karelia, along with the Saint Petersburg-Sortavala railroad, was ceded to the Soviet Union. Connections to Lappeenranta and Savonlinna were cut.

The bombing of the Elisenvaara railway station on 20 June 1944, during the final stages of the Continuation War, was the most fatal bombing in Finnish history; over a hundred civilians were killed when the Soviet air bombs hit a train of Karelian evacuees.

Elisenvaara had the status of urban-type settlement from 1946 until 1992.

== Administrative and municipal status ==
Elisenvaara is the administrative center of the Elisenvaara rural settlement within the Lakhdenpokhsky District, covering an area of 367.4 square kilometers (141.9 sq mi). It includes ten other settlements: Akkakharyu, Esterlo, Kayvomyaki, Ketrovaara, Kostamoyarvi, Lamminkyulya, Soryo, Syuvyaoro, Taustamyaki and Vyalimyaki.
