= Yakkima =

Yakkima (Russian: Яккима) is the name of several rural localities in the Republic of Karelia, Russia:

- Yakkima, Sortavala, Republic of Karelia, a mestechko under the administrative jurisdiction of the town of republic significance of Sortavala
- Yakkima, Lakhdenpokhsky District, Republic of Karelia, a rural locality classified as a station in Lakhdenpokhsky District
