= Haukkavaara–Pekonlahti narrow-gauge railway =

Defunct narrow-gauge railway in Russia

Overview
- Owner: Ahlstrom-Munksjö
- Stations: 2

Service
- Services: 1

History
- Opened: 1898
- Closed: 1927

Technical
- Line length: 7.3 km (4.5 mi)
- Track length: 15.6 km (9.7 mi)
- Track gauge: 750 mm (2 ft 5 1/2 in)
Route map
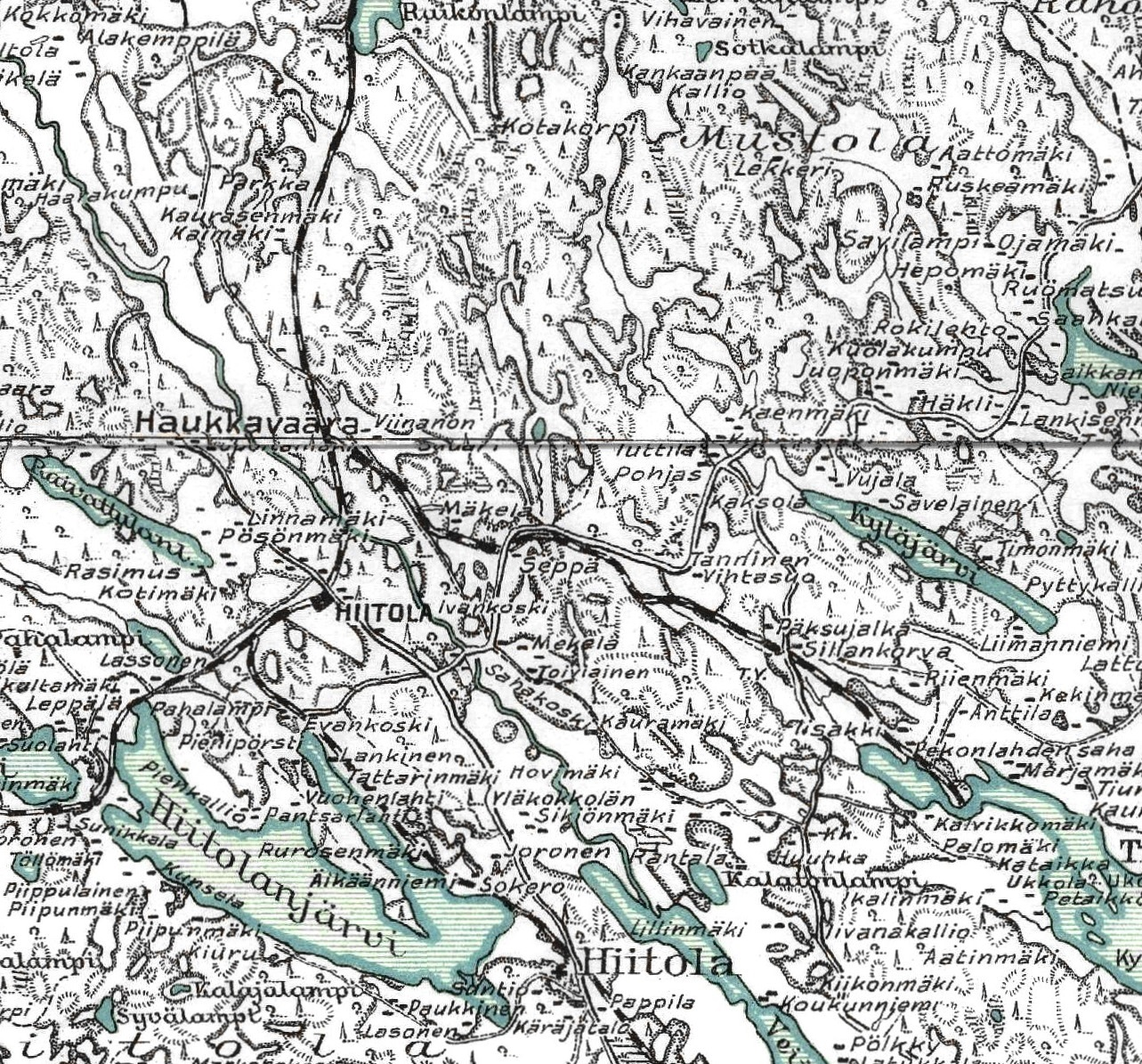

The Haukkavaara–Pekonlahti narrow-gauge railway (Finnish: Haukkavaara–Pekonlahti-rata) was a 750 mm (2 ft 5 1/2 in) narrow gauge railway in use between 1898 and 1927 in the Khiytola parish (nowadays the Khiytola rural settlement of Lakhdenpokhsky District of the Republic of Karelia). The railway was owned by a sawmill in Pekonlahti and was used mostly to transport finished products to a broad gauge railway station. Until 1918, it also transported passengers.

== History ==
In 1865, in Khiytola parish near Pekonlahti Bay, the Vyborg-based company Tikhanov and Sons built a sawmill. It was constructed with advanced technology for the time – all of its equipment and tools were powered by a steam engine. In 1897, it was purchased by the Viipurin Puutavara Oy company. On 15 January [O.S. 27 January] 1898 in Haukkavaara on the railway line between Antrea and Sortavala, built and opened five years earlier, Haukkavaara station opened. Because of the very difficult terrain, (the only possible line had small-radius curves, unsuitable for wide-gauge rolling stock) building a broad gauge railway was impossible, so a narrow-gauge railway was constructed from Haukkavaara to the Pekonlahti sawmill. It was used to transport lumber from the sawmill to transfer it to a broad gauge railway and send it to Vyborg. The railroad also carried passenger traffic between Haukkavaara and the Pekonlahti docks, where passengers could transfer to a ship plying the route between Saint Petersburg, Kexholm and Serdobol. In 1910, Ahlstrom bought the sawmill and the railway.

After the October Revolution and the Finland's independence, railway traffic began to decline. The ship from Petrograd stopped sailing, affecting passenger traffic on the railway. Lumber supplies to Russia stopped, so the volume of lumber produced declined sharply. Despite this, the railway was still in use. In 1925, it had 15.6 kilometres (9.7 mi) of tracks and over 100 rail cars were in use. But the economic situation in 1927 forced the sawmill to shut down the railway, and it was immediately dismantled. One locomotive was transferred to the Lyaskelya Paper Mill.

Only part of the old railway embankment remains today; it has a road suitable for automobiles built on it.

== Railway structure ==
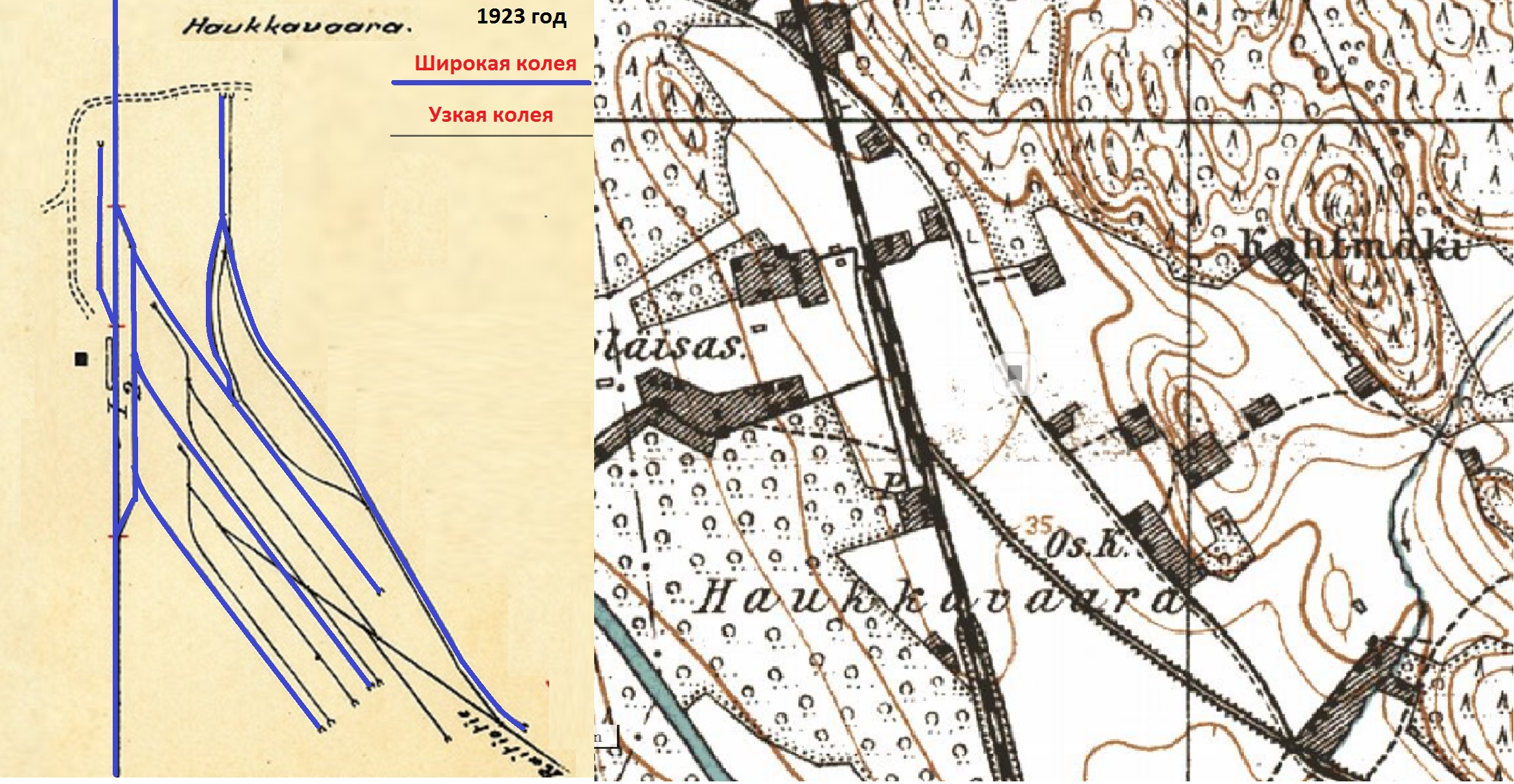
Haukkavaara transfer station diagram in 1923 and Haukkavaara on a 1930s map

The railway began at broad railway station, Haukkavaara, where a large transfer station was built. This station allowed for the transfer of lumber between broad and narrow-gauge cars without using warehouses: this made transferring faster but more dangerous for railroad workers. The station had a separate track with a boarding platform for passengers.

After Haukkavaara, the railroad went south-east to a level crossing over an automobile road from Khiytola, skirted the mountain from the south and went to the south-east along Kivikkoya creek until it reached the north-western shore of Rasinselkya Bay, where the sawmill and docks were. It also had a switch to the south-west, to the Pekonlahti Bay shore where a commodity pier with two warehouses was built. The passenger pier was built at the docks. The railway was 7.3 kilometres (4.5 mi) long with few small-radius curves.

Railway had two American Dixon narrow-gauge locomotives, nearly 100 freight cars and a few passenger cars.

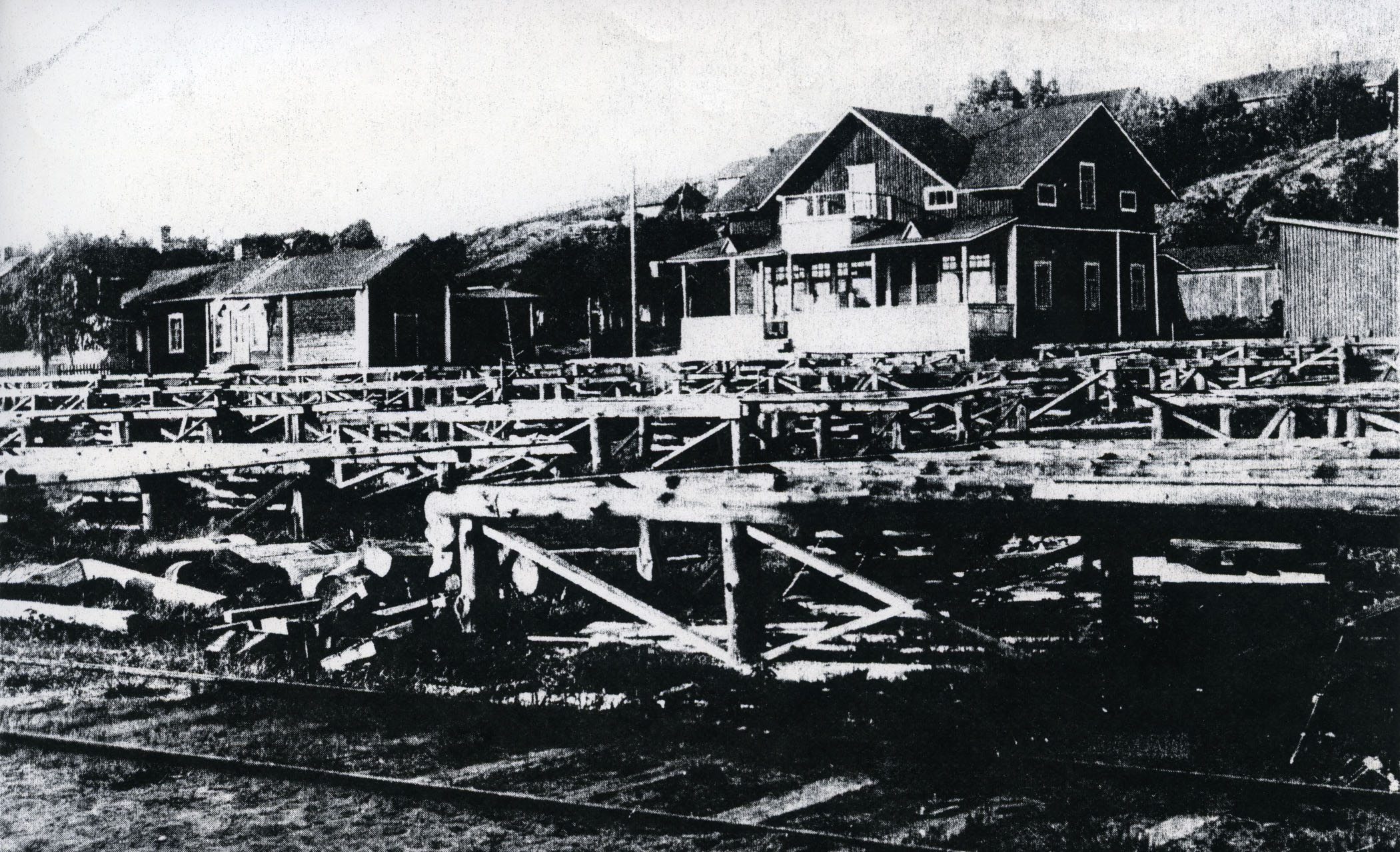
Transfer platforms at Haukkavaara station

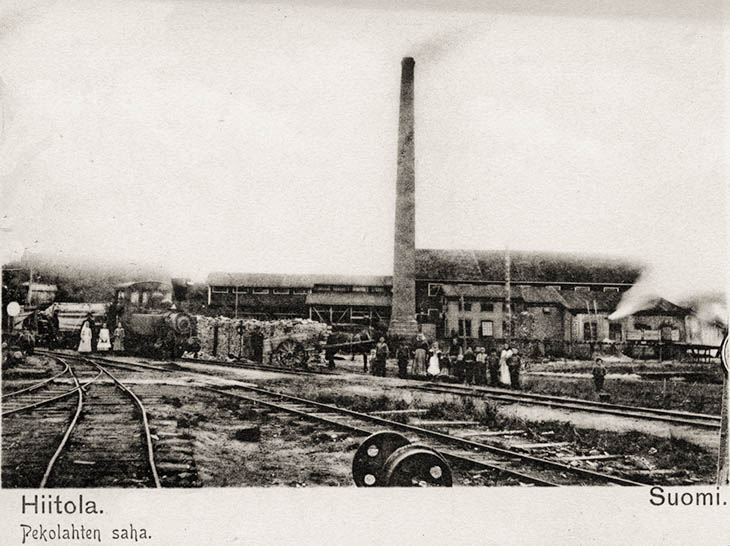
Tracks at Pekonlahti sawmill

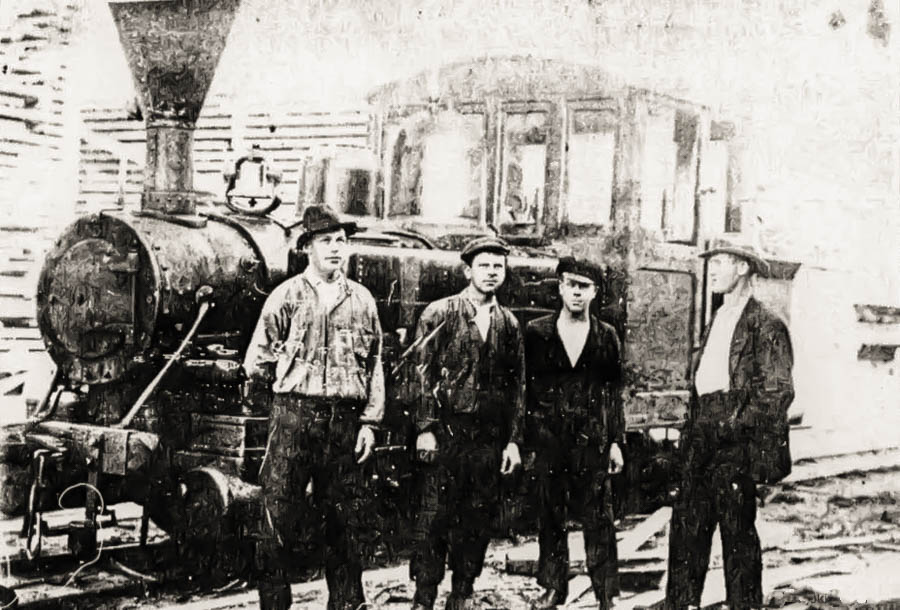
Locomotive used at a railroad. In 1927 it was sold to Lyaskelya.

== Literature ==
- Iltanen, J. (2009). Radan varrella. Suomen rautatieliikennepaikat (in Finnish). Helsinki: Karttakeskus. ISBN 978-951-593-214-3.
