= Soryo, Republic of Karelia =

Soryo Сорьё
- Rural locality
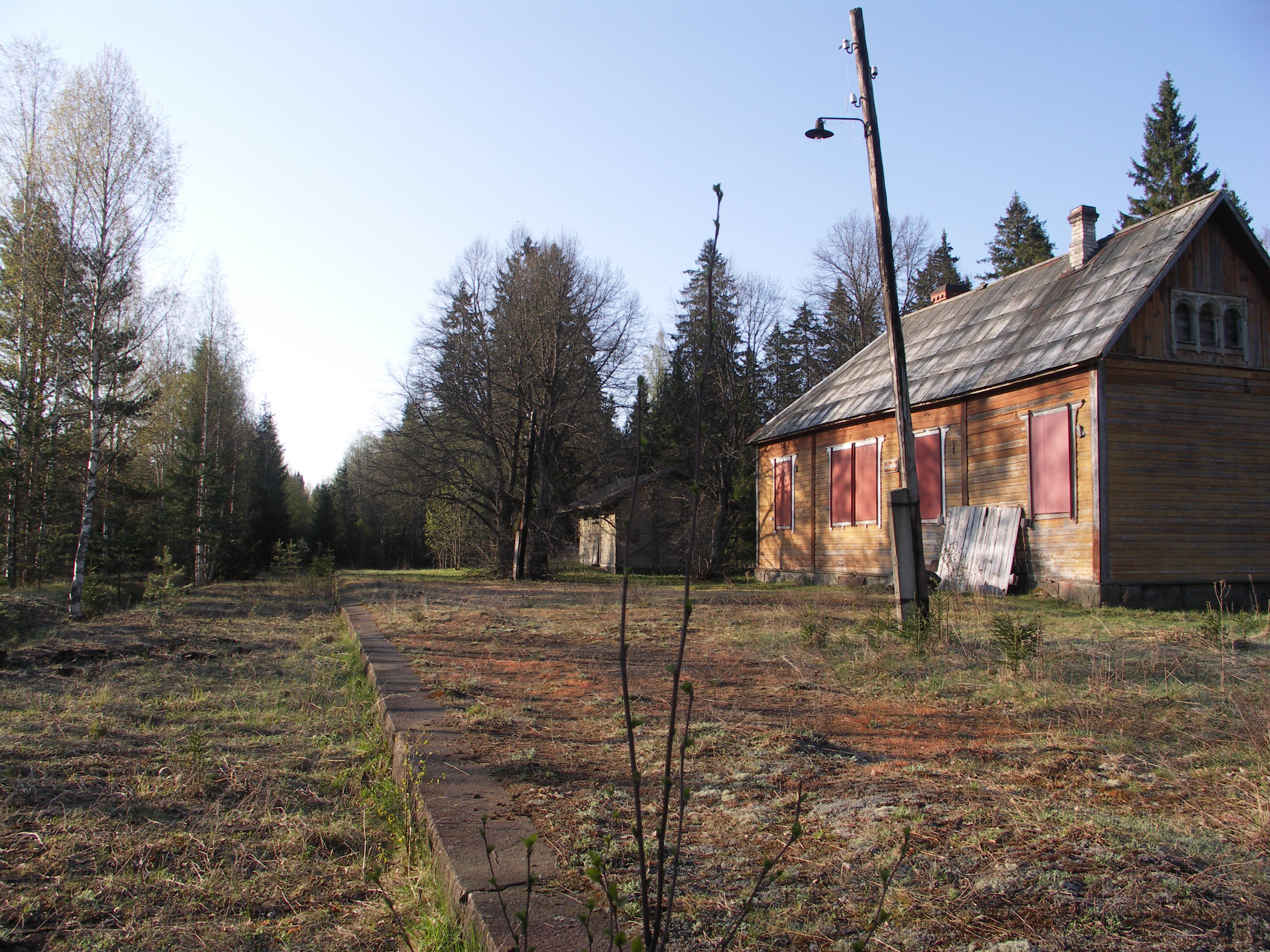
- Railway platform in Soryo

- Location within Karelia Location within Russia
- Coordinates: 61°26′59″N 29°42′22″E
- Country: Russia
- Region: Republic of Karelia
- District: Lakhdenpokhsky District
- Municipality: Elisenvaara Rural Settlement

Population (2012)
  - Total: 0
- Time zone: UTC+3:00

Soryo (Russian: Сорьё; Finnish: Sorjo; Swedish: Sorjos) is a rural locality in the Elisenvaara Rural Settlement of Lakhdenpokhsky District, Republic of Karelia, Russia. The distance to the municipal center Elisenvaara is about 9 kilometers (5.6 mi). As of 2012, there were no permanent inhabitants in the settlement.

== Etymology ==
The name of Soryo (Sorjo, Sorjos) is of Finnish origin and related to the surname Sorjonen. Similar place names are found in southeastern Finland.

== History ==
Before the Winter and Continuation Wars, Sorjo was a village in the Finnish municipality of Kurkijoki, near the border with Parikkala. Unlike other nearby villages, Sorjo had a Swedish-speaking population, as it was settled during the Finnish famine of 1866–1868 by people from the Swedish-speaking parts of Ostrobothnia, including Kronoby, Nedervetil, Pedersöre and Terjärv. At the time, much of Kurkijoki was owned by the von Etter family, who allowed the Ostrobothnians to live on their lands as tenant farmers. As they settled in the woods 23 kilometers (14 mi) away from the parish church, they were exempted from paying rent for ten years. A few years later, the von Etters went bankrupt and the settlers gained full ownership of the lands they had cleared.

The villagers established a Swedish-language school in 1890, which had 33 students in its first year. In 1908, a railway station was opened in Sorjo, after which Finnish-speaking people began moving into the village. Marriages between the two groups were common and Finnish started to become the majority language. A Finnish-language school was established in 1909. Around the same time, forestry gained importance as a source of income, and a sawmill existed in the village for some time. However, agriculture remained the main livelihood, with most products being sold in nearby Elisenvaara.

After the end of the Winter War in 1940, a large part of Finnish Karelia was ceded to the Soviet Union and its population was evacuated to other parts of Finland. At the time, there were 83 Swedish-speaking people in Sorjo. Following the second evacuation after the Continuation War in 1944, the Swedish-speaking villagers were offered land from the Storsarvlax manor in Pernå, where eight families would settle, while others dispersed across Finland.
