= Soryo =

Soryo or Sōryō may refer to:

== People ==
- Fuyumi Soryo (born 1959), Japanese manga artist

== Places ==
- Sōryō, Hiroshima, former town in Japan
- Soryo, Republic of Karelia, rural locality in Russia
