= Siege of Tartu =

Siege of Tartu or Siege of Dorpat may refer to:

- Siege of Tartu (1224)
- Siege of Dorpat (1558)
- Siege of Dorpat (1559)
- Siege of Dorpat (1656)
