= Sovetsky, Leningrad Oblast =

Sovetsky Советский
- Urban-type settlement
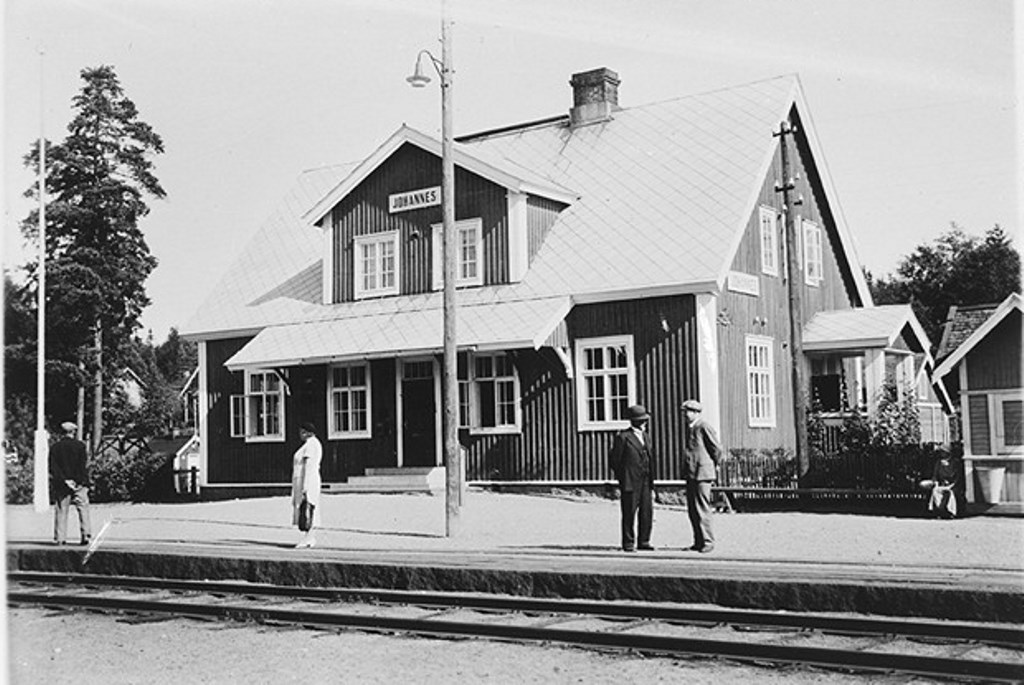
- Interactive map of Sovetsky
- Location of Sovetsky Sovetsky (Leningrad Oblast)
- Coordinates: 60°32′N 28°41′E
- Country: Russia
- Federal subject: Leningrad Oblast
- Administrative district: Vyborgsky District

Population (2010 Census)
  - Total: 7,131
  - Estimate (2024): 6,987 (−2%)

Municipal status
  - Municipal district: Vyborgsky Municipal District
  - Urban settlement: Sovetskoye Urban Settlement
  - Capital of: Sovetskoye Urban Settlement
- Time zone: UTC+3 (MSK)
- Postal code: 188918
- OKTMO ID: 41615163051
- Website: sovetskiy.vbglenobl.ru

Sovetsky (Russian: Сове́тский; Finnish: Johannes) is an urban locality (an urban-type settlement) in Vyborgsky District of Leningrad Oblast, Russia. It is situated on the eastern shore of the Gulf of Vyborg on the Karelian Isthmus. Population: 7,131 (2010 census); 6,607 (2002 census); 6,471 (1989 Soviet census).

== History ==
Until the Winter War and Continuation War, it had been the administrative center of the Johannes municipality of the Viipuri Province of Finland. The territory had been ceded by Finland to the Soviet Union by the Moscow Peace Treaty as a result of the Winter War. It was recaptured by Finns between 1941 and 1944 during Continuation War but was again ceded to Soviets after Moscow Armistice. This secession was formalized after signing Paris Peace Treaty in 1947. The Viipuri Province was divided, with the larger part ceded to Soviet Union and the smaller part remaining in Finland. The population was resettled to Finland, and population from Central Russia was resettled to populate the Karelian Isthmus.

Vyborgsky District with the administrative center in Vyborg was established in March 1940 as a part of the Karelian Autonomous Soviet Socialist Republic, and Johannes was a part of Vyborgsky District. It was given urban-type settlement status. On March 31, 1940 the Karelian Autonomous Soviet Socialist Republic was transformed into the Karelo-Finnish Soviet Socialist Republic. On November 24, 1944, Vyborgsky District was transferred from Karelo-Finnish Soviet Socialist Republic to Leningrad Oblast.On October 1, 1948 the Finnish names of localities were replaced by Russian names, and, in particular, Johannes was renamed Sovetsky, to commemorate Mikhail Sovetsky, a military pilot and a Hero of the Soviet Union.

== Economy ==
=== Industry ===
The economy of the settlement is based on a paper mill.

=== Transportation ===
Sovetsky railway station is located on the Vyborg–Primorsk railroad. There is infrequent suburban service to Vyborg and to the Finland Station of Saint Petersburg.

Sovetsky is connected by roads with Vyborg, Vysotsk, and with Saint Petersburg via Primorsk and Zelenogorsk.
