= Battle of Joutselkä =

Battle between Sweden and Russia in 1555

- Part of Russo-Swedish War (1554–57)
Date	March 11, 1555
Location	Joutselkä village, Kivinebb Parish, today Russia
Result	Swedish victory

Belligerents
Sweden	Tsardom of Russia

Commanders and leaders
Jöns Månsson	Ivan Bibikov †

Strength
560 men	6,000–12,000 men (Swedish claims)

Casualties and losses
Light	300–600 killed (Swedish claim); 900 killed, 49 banners lost (Russian claim)

The Battle of Joutselkä took place on March 11, 1555 in Kivennapa parish on the Karelian Isthmus during the early stages of the Russo-Swedish War 1554–1557. The battle has gone down in military history, because the Swedish commander Jöns Månsson skilfully utilised the terrain, the mobility of the skiers and surprise, thus replacing the large number of men. In terms of military skills, the battle can be compared to the motti tactics of the Winter War.

== Russian forces ==
The main force, led by the boyar Ivan Grigorievich Bibikov, crossed the border on March 10, 1555 and began marching towards Kivennapa. The Erik Jöransson Tegel Chronicle mentions a total of 30,000 men as the number of men in the Russian army, of which the main force of 13,000 men began an attack from the village of Joutselkä on 11 March 1555 towards Kivennapa. The sources in this article consider this number to be exaggerated, but estimate that there were several thousand Russians advancing along the Joutselkä road in the battle.

== Finnish forces and their deployment ==
The Swedish defense was taken care of by bailiff Jöns Månsson. He had at his disposal a regular force of about 560 men. It consisted of 3 squads (about 60 men) of horse and 5 squads (about 100 men) of foot. In addition, the force included about 400 armed peasants. The heavy artillery of Kivennapa blockhouse was difficult to move in winter conditions, which is why the type of cannon chosen by Jöns Månsson was the swivel gun, a 2–2.5-inch ship gun, of which he attached five to sleighs that served as carriages. The basis for good mobility of the infantry were skis.

In the Joutselkä clearing, deep snow limited the use of cavalry. Therefore, horse and foot soldiers without skis were placed in the center of the defense line, the purpose of which was to tie down the advancing enemy by attacking in the direction of the road. Those moving on skis, i.e. most of the peasantry, were stationed on the flanks. The goal of these detachments was to encircle the enemy advancing along the road. The speed of the skiers' attack was promoted by the fact that the open terrain from Joutselkä towards the border is gently sloping. Most of the skiers stationed on the flanks were invisible to the enemy, probably in a wide front.

== Battle ==
When the Russian vanguard spotted the center of the Finnish troops, it stopped and spread out for a firefight. While the expansion was underway, the Finnish swiwel guns fired a salvo, and immediately after this, the Finns began an attack in the center, encircling the Russian troops, who had been hampered by deep snow and had not yet had time to deploy. Ivan Grigorievich fell right at the start of the attack by the salvo from the Finnish guns. Soon, the Russians saw that Finnish skiers appeared from the forests on the sites, advancing far from the road towards the border. The unorganized Russian spearhead could not hold its own against the attack of the Finnish troops in the center, but fled.

Jöns Månsson decided to continue the attack against the flanks of the main Russian force, which was unprepared for battle. Being unorganized, the Russian troops were unable to resist and began to flee in packs towards the border. The Finnish troops had managed to cut off the way back, but due to the small number of men, they were unable to prevent the Russian troops from escaping. Upon hearing of the defeat of the main force, the other Russian detachments that had crossed the border turned back.

== Aftermath ==
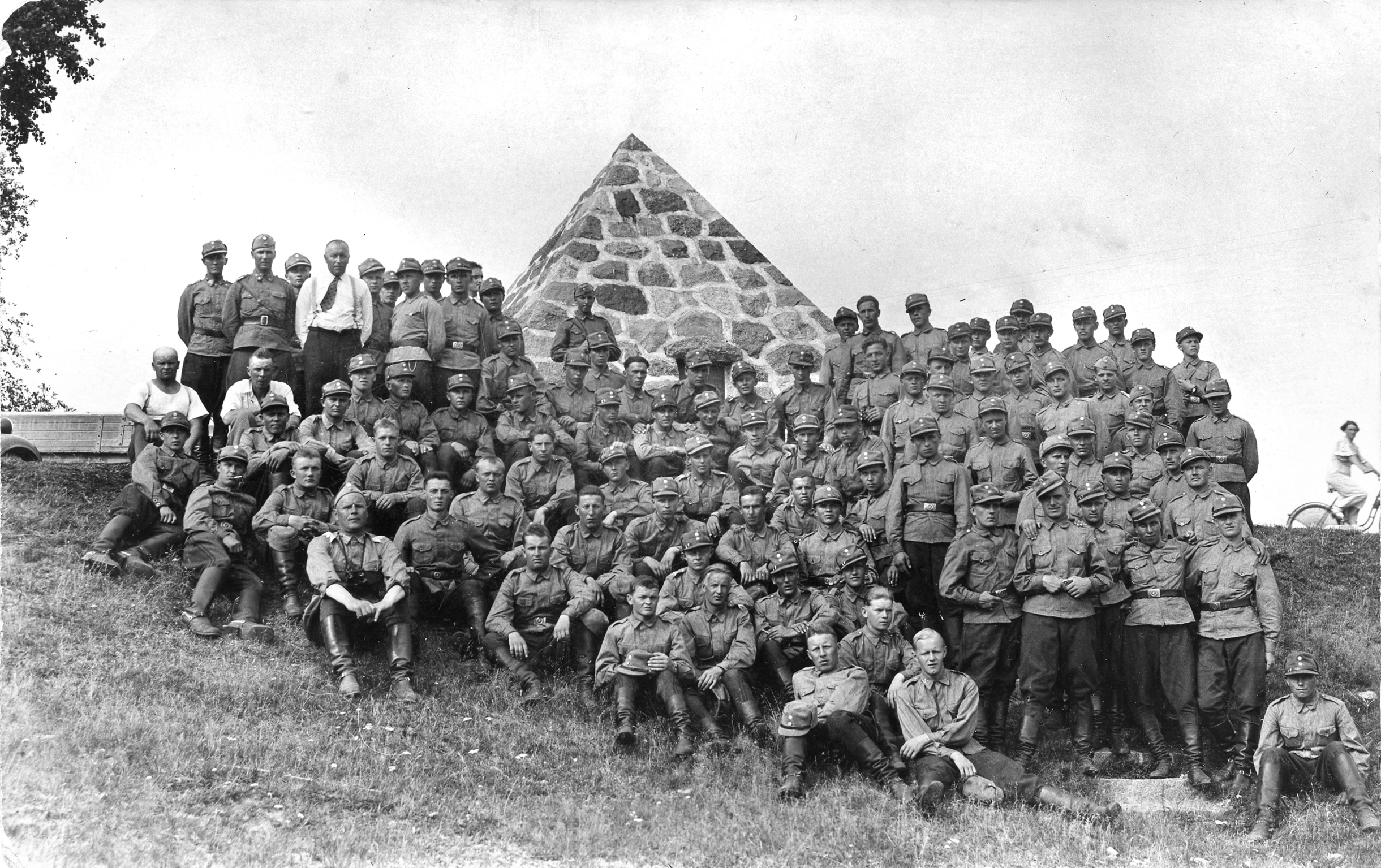
Memorial to the battle of Joutselkä built in 1931, and destroyed by Russian local authorities in 1963.

The number of Russian casualties is estimated at about 300 in the fight of the vanguard, and 600 in the second phase of the battle. There is no information about the losses of the Finns.

The battle of Joutselkä prompted King Gustav Eriksson to change the tactical instructions concerning Finland. The new instructions were based on Jöns Månssons tactics. The instructions emphasized reconnaissance, knowledge of the enemy's way of fighting, offensive defense, enemy exhaustion and surprise.
