= Ozyorskoye, Leningrad Oblast =

Rural locality in Vyborgsky District, Russia

Coordinates: 60°51′45″N 29°28′10″E

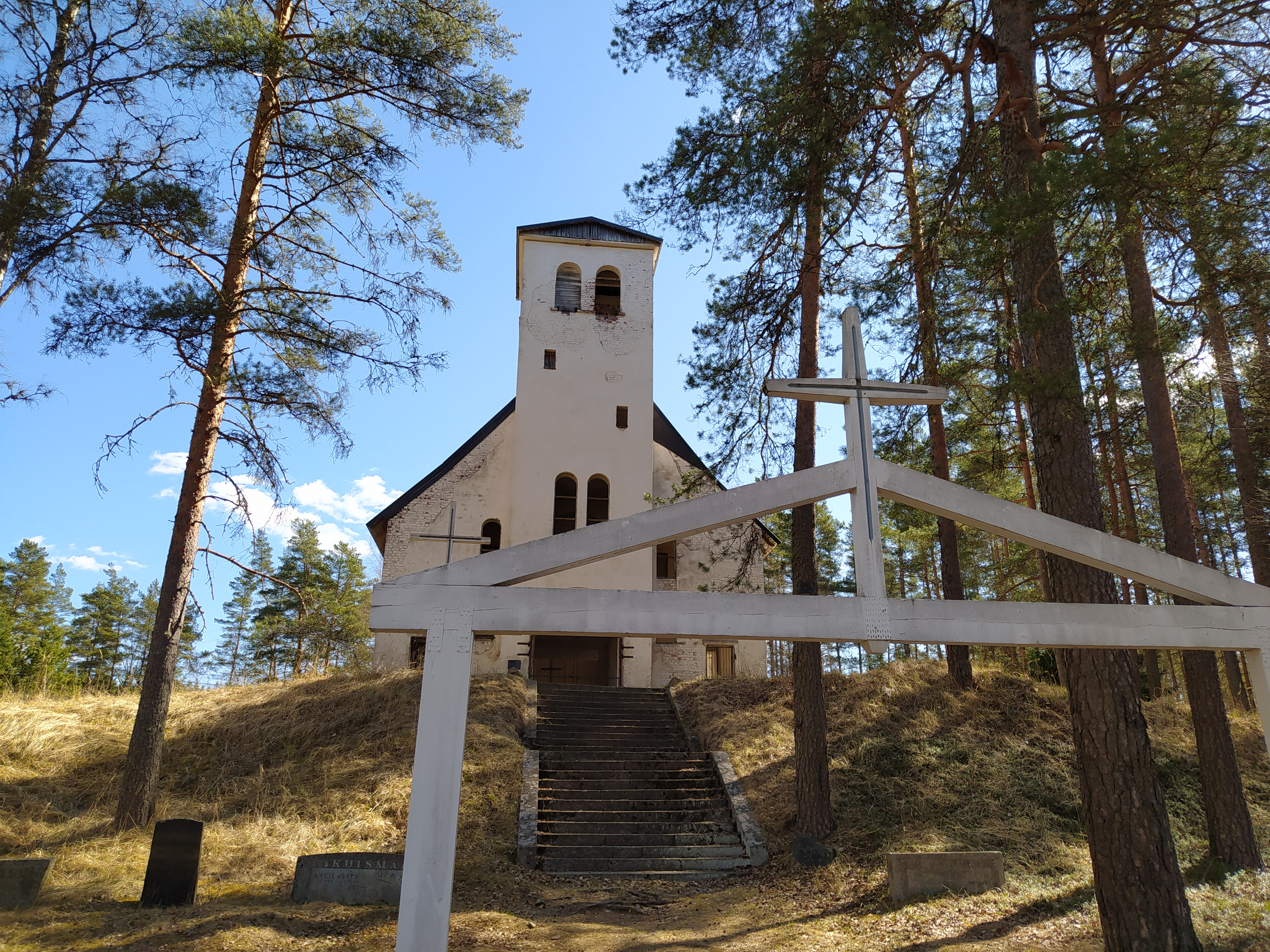
Lutheran Church in Vuoksenranta, Ozerskoye, Vyborg District, Leningrad Region

Ozyorskoye (Russian: Озёрское; Finnish: Vuoksenranta) is a rural locality in Vyborgsky District of Leningrad Oblast, Russia, located on the Karelian Isthmus. Until the Winter War and Continuation War, it had been the administrative center of the Vuoksenranta Municipality of Viipuri Province, Finland. Ozyorskoye has a village and church. Before the Winter War The church had a farm with sheep inside.
