= Lakhdenpokhya =

Town in the Republic of Karelia, Russia

Lakhdenpokhya Лахденпохья Lahdenpohja (Finnish)
- Town

Other transcription(s)
  - Finnish: Lahdenpohja
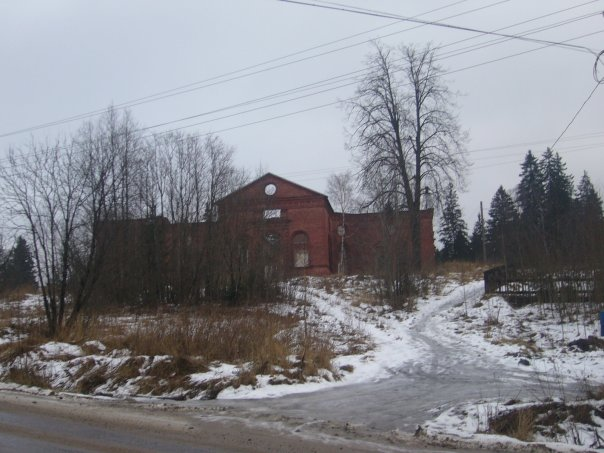
- An abandoned Lutheran church in Lakhdenpokhya

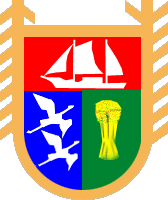
- Coat of arms
- Interactive map of Lakhdenpokhya
- Location of Lakhdenpokhya Lakhdenpokhya (Karelia)
- Coordinates: 61°31′20″N 30°11′33″E
- Country: Russia
- Federal subject: Republic of Karelia
- Administrative district: Lakhdenpokhsky District
- Founded: 1600
- Town status since: 1945

Government
  - Head: Lyudmila Glytenko
- Elevation: 10 m (33 ft)

Population (2010 Census)
  - Total: 7,813
  - Estimate (2023): 5,855 (−25.1%)

Administrative status
  - Capital of: Lakhdenpokhsky District

Municipal status
  - Municipal district: Lakhdenpokhsky Municipal District
  - Urban settlement: Lakhdenpokhskoye Urban Settlement
  - Capital of: Lakhdenpokhsky Municipal District, Lakhdenpokhskoye Urban Settlement
- Time zone: UTC+3 (UTC+03:00)
- Postal code: 186730
- OKTMO ID: 86618101001
- Website: lahdenpohya-adm.ru

Lakhdenpokhya (Russian: Лахденпо́хья; Finnish and Swedish: Lahdenpohja) is a town and the administrative center of Lakhdenpokhsky District of the Republic of Karelia, Russia, located 330 kilometers (210 mi) west of Petrozavodsk on the Aurajoki River. Population: 7,813 (2010 census); 8,751 (2002 census); 10,429 (1989 Soviet census).

== History ==
Historical affiliations

Russia 1600–1617
Sweden 1617–1721
Russia (empire) 1721–1812
Finland 1812-1917,
autonomous part of
- Russia (empire)
- Russia (republic)
- Russia (Soviet republic)
>Finland 1917–1940
>>Soviet Union 1940–1991
- conquered by Finland
in the Continuation War (1941–1944)
>Russia from 1991

Lahdenpohja literally means "bay's bottom". It has been a marketplace since the 17th century, located on an old trade route going as far as Oulu. It was mentioned in 1638 as Lahen Pohia, reflecting the local pronunciation of lahden (genitive case form of lahti, bay) as lahen. It was a part of the Jaakkima parish until 1924, when Lahdenpohja was separated from it as a kauppala. The locals also called it Lopotti, a Russian loanword (see sloboda) referring to a built-up area smaller than a town. Lahdenpohja was ceded to the Soviet Union after the Winter and Continuation Wars. Lakhdenpokhya is simply an alternate romanization of Лахденпохья, the Russian transcription of the Finnish name.

Town status was granted to it in 1945.

=== Post-Soviet period ===
In the early 1990s, two granite blocks of a monument to local Finnish soldiers who died in 1918 were returned to the ruins of the church, and a memorial cross was erected. With Finland's participation, the conservation of the walls of the Lutheran church was carried out.

In 1995, the Orthodox Chapel of St. George the Victorious was erected in the town.

In 2004, the Orthodox Chapel of St. Great Martyr Valentine of Rome was erected in the city.

In 2020, Ramiz Mubarizovich Kazymov, mayor of Lakhdenpokhya and a member of the United Russia party, was deprived of his driver's license for drunk driving.

== Administrative and municipal status ==
Within the framework of administrative divisions, Lakhdenpokhya serves as the administrative center of Lakhdenpokhsky District, to which it is directly subordinated. As a municipal division, the town of Lakhdenpokhya, together with the station of Yakkima, is incorporated within Lakhdenpokhsky Municipal District as Lakhdenpokhskoye Urban Settlement.

== Transportation ==
The town serves as a railway station on the Vyborg–Joensuu railway.

== Economy ==
The city—forming enterprise — Lahdenpokhsky plywood mill «Bumex» - was organized in the 1950s on the basis of the former Finnish plywood factory — the joint-stock division of Laatokan Puu Oy of «Ladoga Timber Ab».

There is a forestry enterprise, a forestry station, and a bakery. In 2003, the «Aalto» distillery was launched.

By Order of the Government of the Russian Federation dated 2014.07.29 No. 1398-r (as amended on 2015.11.24) «On approval of the list of monotowns», the city is included in the list of monotowns of the Russian Federation that have risks of deterioration of the socio-economic situation.

In 2023, the city took the second place in the ranking of places in Russia for recreation at the bases according to the booking service «TVIL».
