= Aleksander Strandman =

Finnish politician

Aleksander Strandman (7 October 1856 – 8 February 1933) was a Finnish politician. He was a member of the Senate of Finland.
