= Lyaskelya =

Lyaskelya Ляскеля Läskelä
- Rural locality
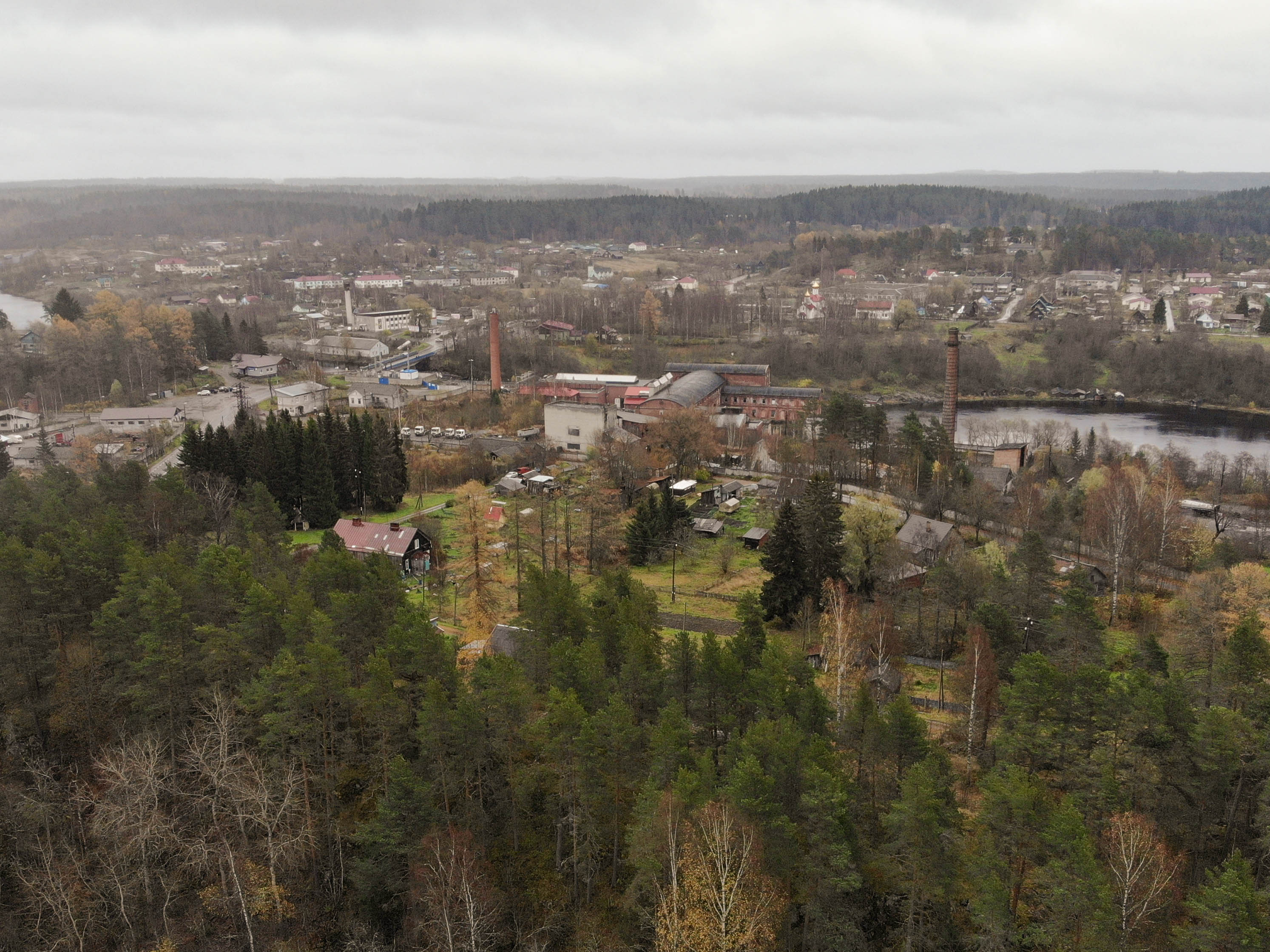

- Flag Coat of arms

- Location within Karelia Location within Russia
- Coordinates: 61°45′45″N 31°0′30″E
- Country: Russia
- Region: Republic of Karelia
- District: Pitkyarantsky District

Population (2013)
  - Total: 2,888
- Time zone: UTC+3:00

Lyaskelya (Russian: Ляскеля, Finnish and Karelian: Läskelä) is a rural locality (posyolok) in Pitkyarantsky District, Republic of Karelia, Russia. As of 2013, it had a population of 2,888.

Läskelä has existed at least since 1618 and began industrializing in the 18th century, with paper production becoming an important industry in the early 20th century, while the settlement was part of Finland. Lyaskelya was ceded by Finland to the Soviet Union after World War II, with the paper factory being rebuilt soon afterwards, continuing to operate until 2004.

== Geography ==
Lyaskelya is located along the lower course of the river Yanisyoki flowing from Lake Yanisyarvi into Lake Ladoga. The distance to the district center Pitkyaranta is about 38.5 kilometers (23.9 mi), while that to Saint Petersburg is about 280 kilometers (170 mi). A railroad connecting Pitkyaranta to Yanisyarvi passes through Lyaskelya.

Lyaskelya was the municipal center of a rural settlement until 2023, when all municipalities in the district were consolidated into a municipal okrug, covering the entire district. Aside from Lyaskelya itself, the municipality included the villages of Kerisyurya, Khiydenselga, Paussu and Yanis. Khiydenselga and Yanis are officially counted as parts of Lyaskelya in statistics. On 1 January 2013, the municipality had a population of 2,946, of whom 2,888 lived in Lyaskelya (Khiydenselga and Yanis included).

== History ==
Läskelä was first mentioned in 1618. According to Saulo Kepsu, the name may originate from the Finnish surname Leskinen, which was common on the Karelian Isthmus in the 16th century, in which case the name having an -ä- instead of -e- would be the result of a scribal corruption. Alternatively, the name may be derived from a nickname *Läski(nen) (from läski 'lard, pork fat').

The first industrial enterprises in Läskelä were sawmills established by merchants from Viipuri in the late 18th century. At the time, Ladoga Karelia was part of Russia within "Old Finland", while most of Finland was still part of Sweden. Despite being illegal at the time, people living along the Jänisjoki would drive logs from the Swedish side to the sawmills. The rest of Finland became part of Russia in the early 19th century as the Grand Duchy of Finland.

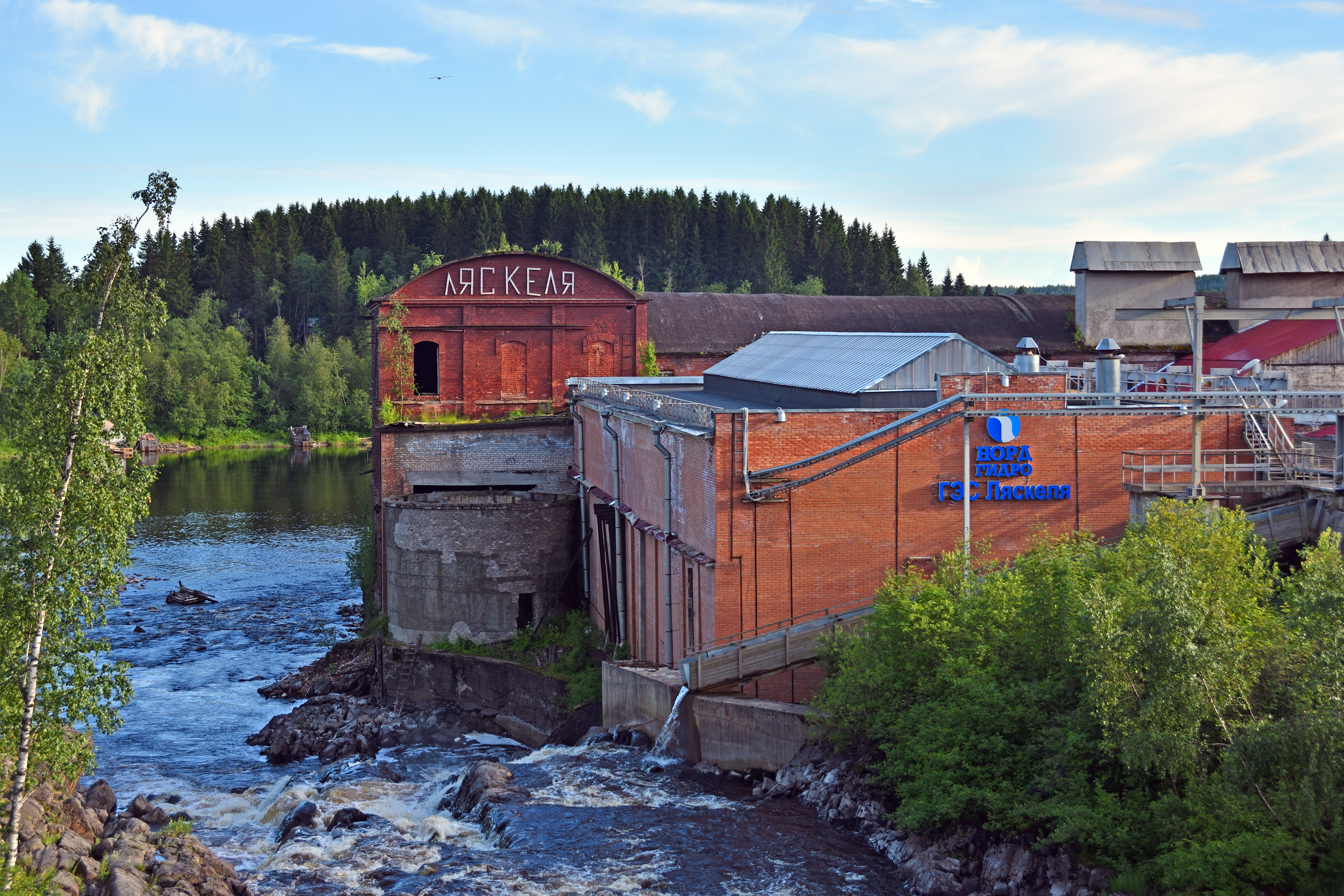
Lyaskelya hydroelectric plant in 2019.

In 1860, the Läskelänkoski rapids, owned by the artillery department of the Ministry of War, were bought by Nils Ludvig Arppe, who owned ironworks in Värtsilä and Möhkö (in Ilomantsi). His plan was to establish a trip hammer facility for refining pig iron produced at said ironworks, however, Arppe died in 1861 and the original plan was never realized. A metal workshop producing nails, later also anchors, was eventually established in 1875, but was closed in 1888. A sawmill continued to exist in Läskelä until being moved to the village of Joensuu (modern Khiydenselga) at the mouth of the Jänisjoki in 1897. A hydroelectric power plant was built on the site of the old sawmill in 1899, mainly to power facilities in Läskelä itself, but electricity was also transmitted to the Välimäki iron mine in Impilahti. This was the second instance of electric power transmission being used in Finland; the first one was also in Ladoga Karelia, from the Uuksunjoki river to the mines in Pitkäranta.

The production of paper in Läskelä began with the establishment of a mechanical pulp mill in 1903, and the first paper machine started operation in 1906. In the early 1920s, the paper factory employed some 400 people. Many factory workers were also engaged in agriculture, and the company that owned the factory, Läskelä Oy, also owned and cleared new farmland around Läskelä.

Until 1922, Läskelä was part of the municipality of Sortavalan maalaiskunta. In that year, Läskelä became part of the newly-formed municipality of Harlu, which also included the industrial settlements of Joensuu, Leppäkoski and Hämekoski. Läskelä was connected to the Finnish rail network in 1925, two years after Hämekoski and Harlu. Between the 1920s and 1930s, Läskelä Oy had acquired the factories of Leppäkoski and Hämekoski, but was affected by an economic depression soon after and the company became part of Kymmene Oy in 1935. Forestry along the Jänisjoki was highly profitable until the start of World War II in 1939.

After the end of the Winter War in 1940, Lyaskelya became part of the Soviet Union, and the paper factory continued operation in April of that year. The factory had to be rebuilt again after the end of World War II (Continuation War) and began producing newspaper and wrapping paper in 1946. The Finnish population was evacuated to other parts of Finland: factory workers from Harlu settled across the country, while farmers were resettled mainly around Jyväskylä and Pieksämäki. The area of Harlu was in turn repopulated by people from across the Soviet Union. Most buildings in Lyaskelya had been destroyed during the war, with some remaining Finnish-era buildings including the railway station and a school building.

In 1958, the paper factory and Kharlu pulp mill were united into a combine, remaining one until the pulp mill was closed in 1988. By the 1970s, newspaper was no longer produced, having been replaced by the production of wallpaper. The paper factory continued to operate after the dissolution of the Soviet Union, producing about 25% of all wallpaper in Russia from 1991 until 1999. The factory was closed in 2004, as modernizing its equipment would have been too expensive. The hydroelectric plant is still in use as of 2021.

== Economy and services ==
As of 2012, enterprises in Lyaskelya included a cardboard factory, lumber production and a cooperative of meat producers, among others. Services include a school, a pharmacy, a library and a House of Culture. Bus lines between Sortavala and Petrozavodsk, as well as Petrozavodsk and Saint Petersburg, pass through Lyaskelya.

== Churches ==
There are two Orthodox churches in Lyaskelya: the church of Michael the Archangel built between 2012 and 2016 and the church of the Nativity of John the Baptist built between 2010 and 2017.

There is also a Lutheran church in Lyaskelya, part of the Harlu parish of the Evangelical Lutheran Church of Ingria. The church was finished in 2011 and its construction was supported by Harlu-seura, an organization for the descendants of Finnish evacuees from Harlu based in Kangasniemi. While part of Finland, Läskelä had belonged to the parish of Harlu within the Evangelical Lutheran Church of Finland, but had had its own chapel since 1915.

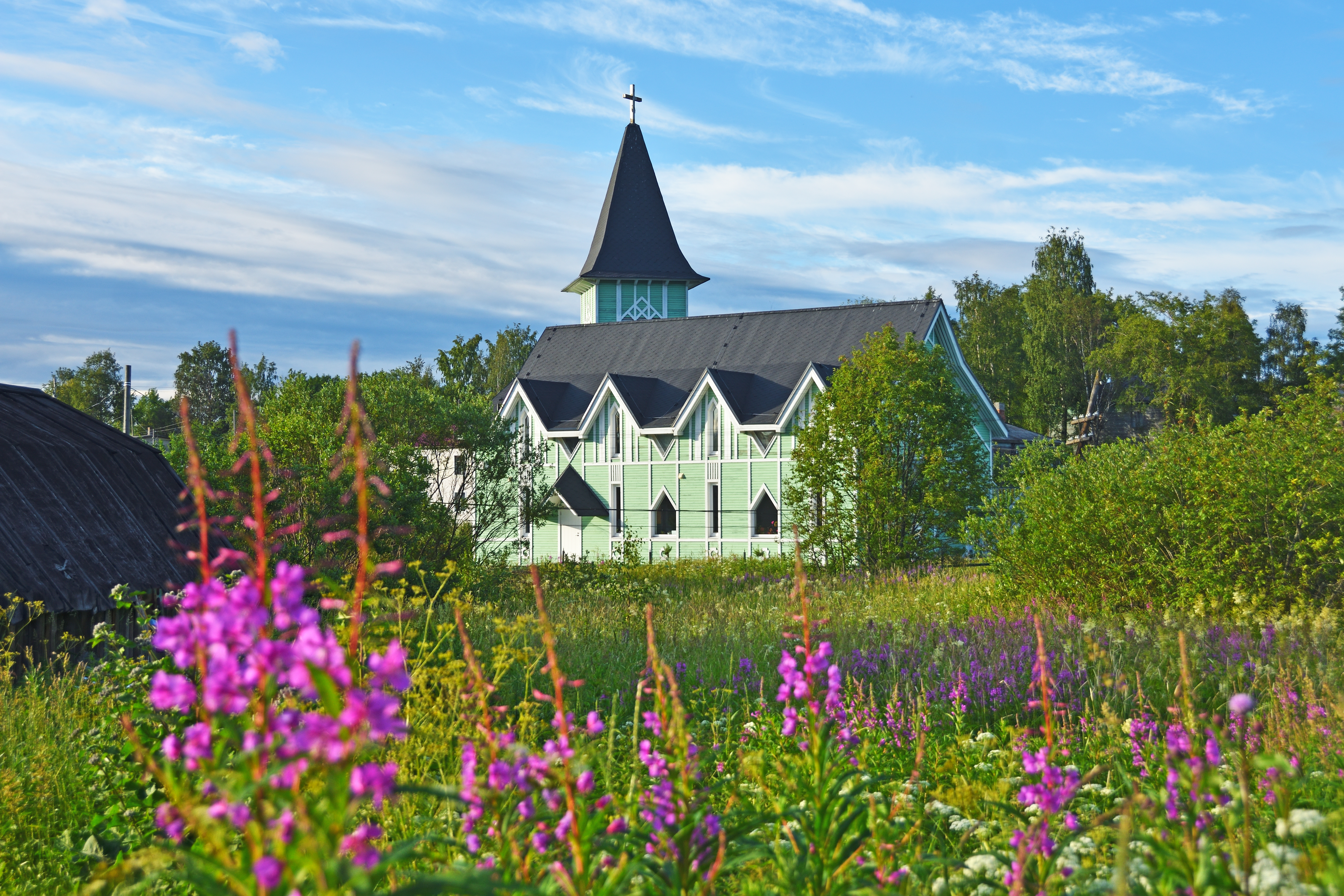
Lutheran church

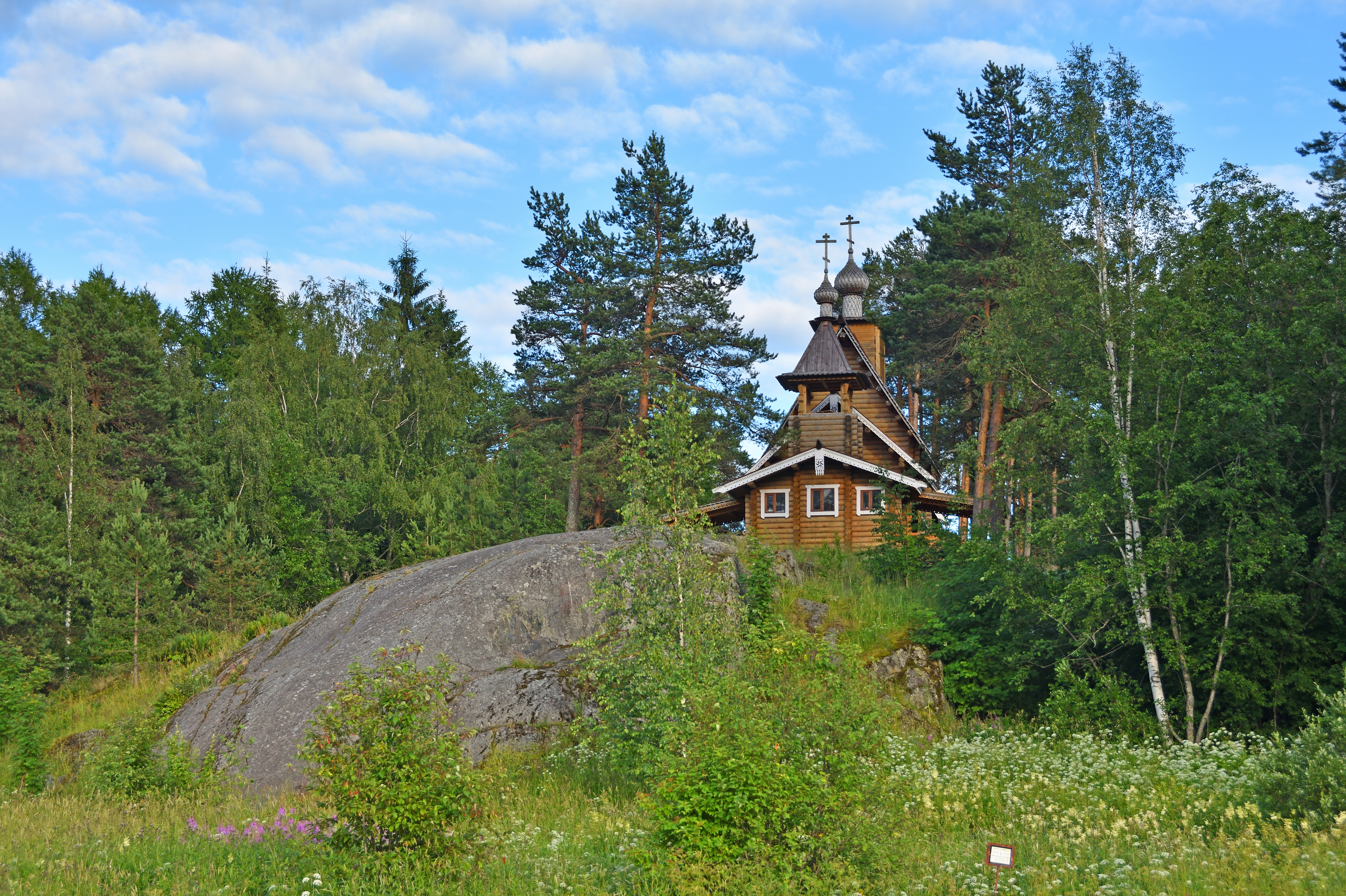
Orthodox church of the Nativity of John the Baptist
