= Harlu =

Former municipality of Finland

Coordinates: 61°48′14″N 30°56′15″E

Harlu is a former municipality of Finland located in the present-day Russia. Harlu was part of the Ladoga Karelia district, an area ceded to the Soviet Union in 1940 in the Moscow Peace Treaty. Administratively the area is nowadays part of the Pitkyarantsky District in the Republic of Karelia. The municipality ceased to function in 1948.

== History and Demographics ==
Harlu was founded in 1922 after extensive demographic and industrial development in the area. A decision of creating an Evangelical Lutheran parish to the area had already been made by the Finnish Senate in 1916 when Finland was still a Grand Duchy under Russian dominion, and the parish started fully functioning in 1918 in the freshly independent Finland. The Finnish Orthodox Church didn't establish a parish in the area despite a significant amount of its members residing in the area.

Harlu had a land area of approximately 252,6 km² and its population was 7 828 (1939) with a population density of 30,99 people per km².

Harlu constituted of nine villages: Harlu (also Leppäkoski), Heinäjoki, Honkakylä, Häyskynvaara, Joensuu, Läskelä, Paussu, Tenjärvi and Vehkalahti.
