= Sorjonen (surname) =

Sorjonen is a Finnish surname. Notable people with the surname include:

== People ==
- Hilarius Sorjonen (1908–1954), Finnish criminal
- Kauko Sorjonen (b. 1942), Finnish business director and cultural patron
- Kyösti Sorjonen (1912–1996), Finnish journalist, rebel and author
- Marja-Leena Sorjonen (b. 1956), Professor of Finnish
- Timo Sorjonen, Finnish hockey player
- Toivo Ilmari Sorjonen (1904–1970), Finnish teacher and association leader

== Fictional characters and series ==
- Bordertown (Finnish TV series), a Finnish television series known as "Sorjonen" in Finnish
  - Kari Sorjonen, main character in Bordertown
