= Melnikovo, Leningrad Oblast =

Rural locality in Priozersky District, Russia

Coordinates: 60°55′15″N 29°45′50″E

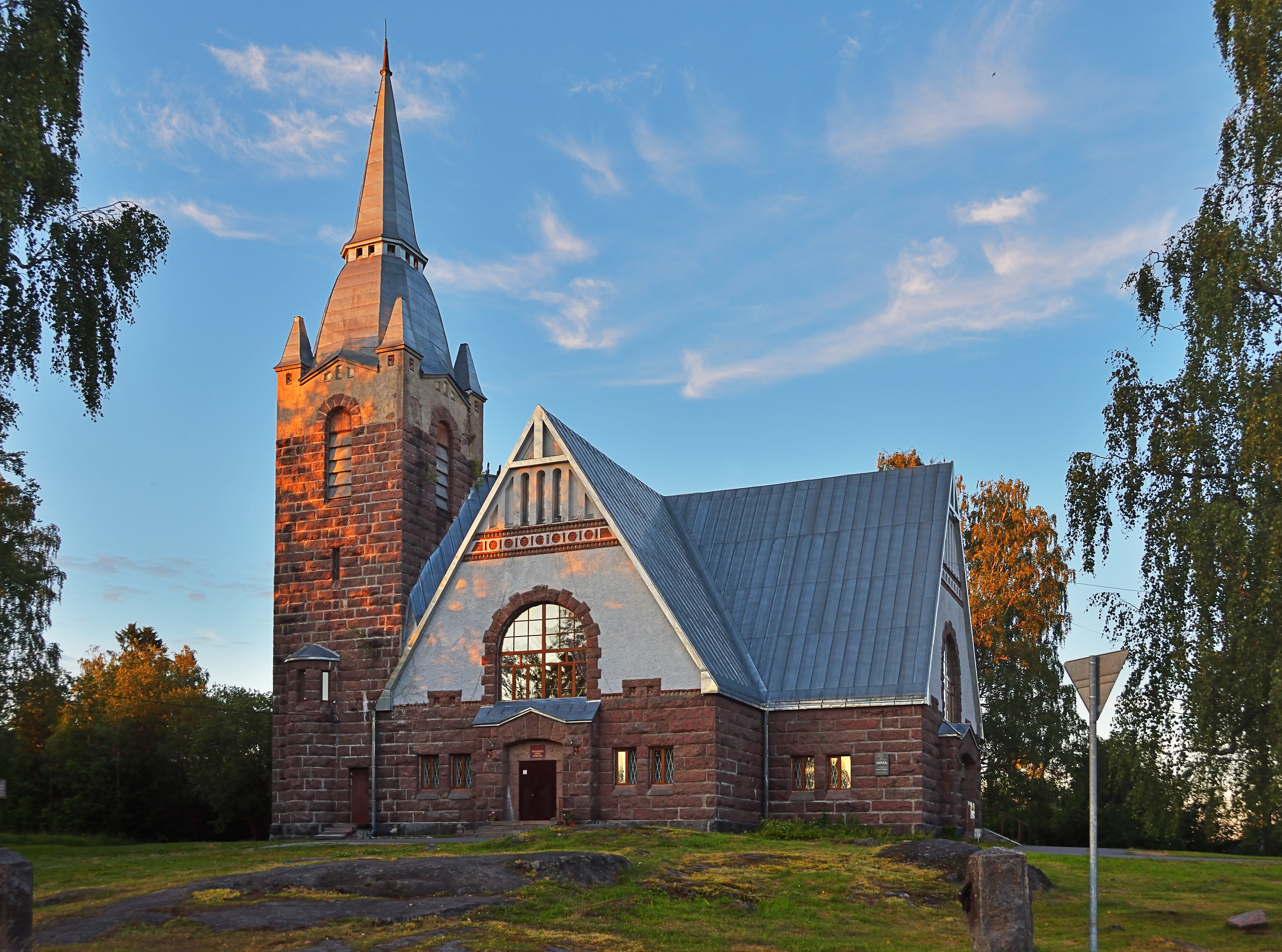
Melnikovo Lutheran church

Melnikovo (Russian: Ме́льниково; Finnish: Räisälä) is a rural locality (a settlement) on Karelian Isthmus, in Priozersky District of Leningrad Oblast. Before the Winter War and Continuation War it was the administrative center of the Räisälä municipality of Finland.
