= Sevastyanovo, Vologda Oblast =

Sevastyanovo Севастьяново
- Village
- Location within Vologda Oblast Location within Russia
- Coordinates: 59°33′N 39°09′E
- Country: Russia
- Region: Vologda Oblast
- District: Vologodsky District
- Time zone: UTC+3:00

Sevastyanovo (Russian: Севастьяново) is a rural locality (a village) in Novlenskoye Rural Settlement, Vologodsky District, Vologda Oblast, Russia. The population was 205 as of 2002.

== Geography ==
Sevastyanovo is located 72 km northwest of Vologda (the district's administrative centre) by road. Mardasovo is the nearest rural locality.
