= Yakkima, Lakhdenpokhsky District, Republic of Karelia =

Yakkima Яккима
- Station
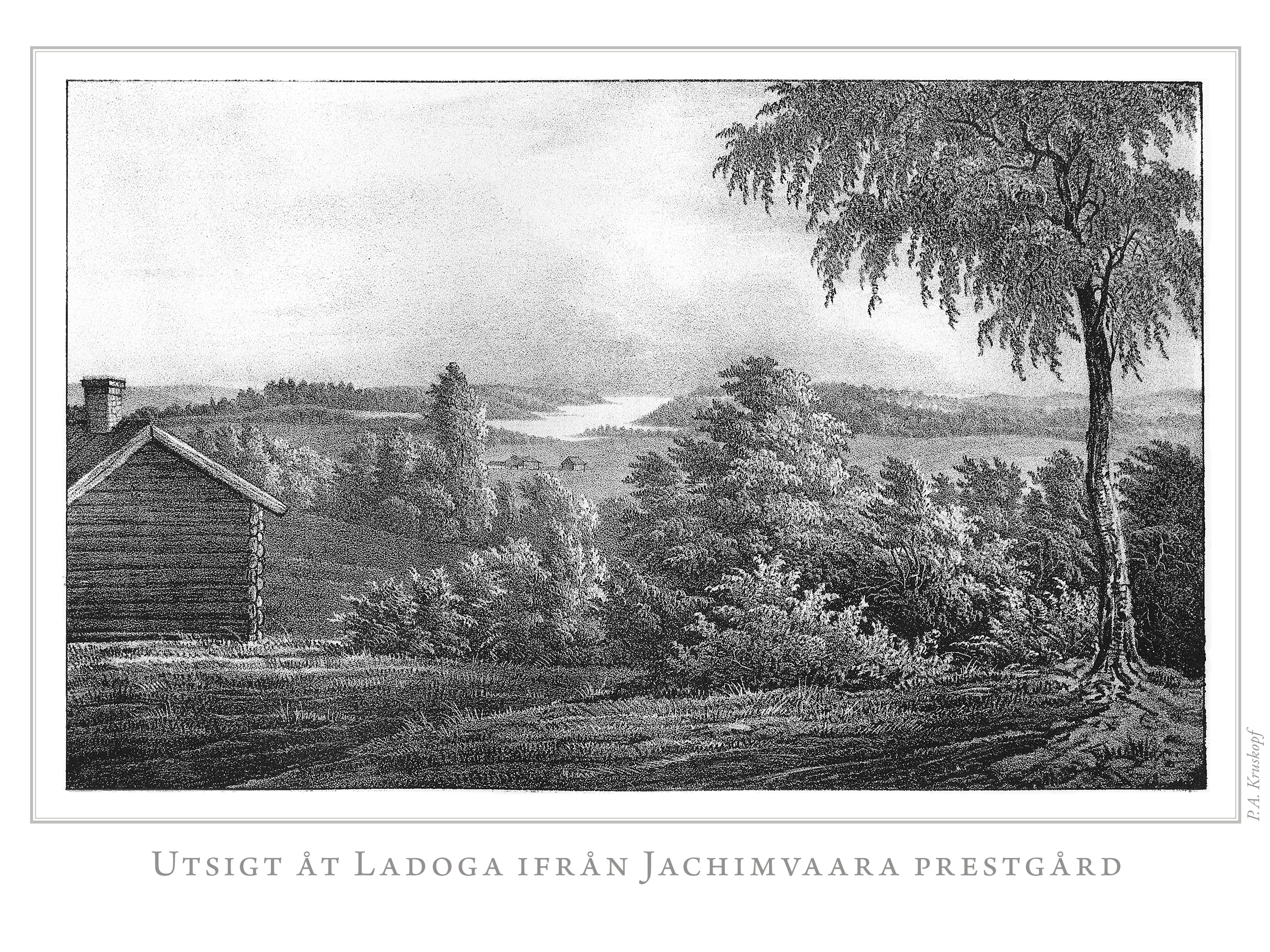
- Illustration of the view of Ladoga from Jaakkima in Finland framstäldt i teckningar edited by Zacharias Topelius and published 1845-1852
- Interactive map of Yakkima
- Location of Yakkima Yakkima (Karelia)
- Coordinates: 61°31′00″N 30°08′23″E
- Country: Russia
- Federal subject: Republic of Karelia
- Administrative district: Lakhdenpokhsky District

Municipal status
  - Municipal district: Lakhdenpokhsky Municipal District
- Time zone: UTC+3 (UTC+03:00)
- Postal code: 186792
- OKTMO ID: 86618101106

Yakkima (Russian: Яккима; Finnish: Jaakkima; Swedish: Jakimvaara) is a rural locality located in Lakhdenpokhsky District of the Republic of Karelia, Russia.

== History ==
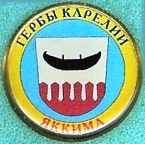
An unofficial coat of arms, also used by Karelian heritage organizations in Finland.

Jaakkima was originally called Jaakkimanvaara (Jaakkima's hill), first mentioned in 1589 as Jacon wara in Swedish sources. It became a separate parish in 1647, having been formed from parts of the Kurkijoki, Sortavala and Uukuniemi parishes.

The Jaakkima municipality became smaller in the 1920s, as Lumivaara was separated from it in 1923. Lahdenpohja (Lakhdenpokhya) was separated soon after in 1924.

As a result of the Winter War Yakkima was occupied by and ceded to the Soviet Union. Finland occupied Yakkima in the Continuation War in 1941, but the Soviet Union regained the territory in 1944 in accordance with the Moscow Armistice. Most of its inhabitants were relocated to the area surrounding Seinäjoki.

== Church ==
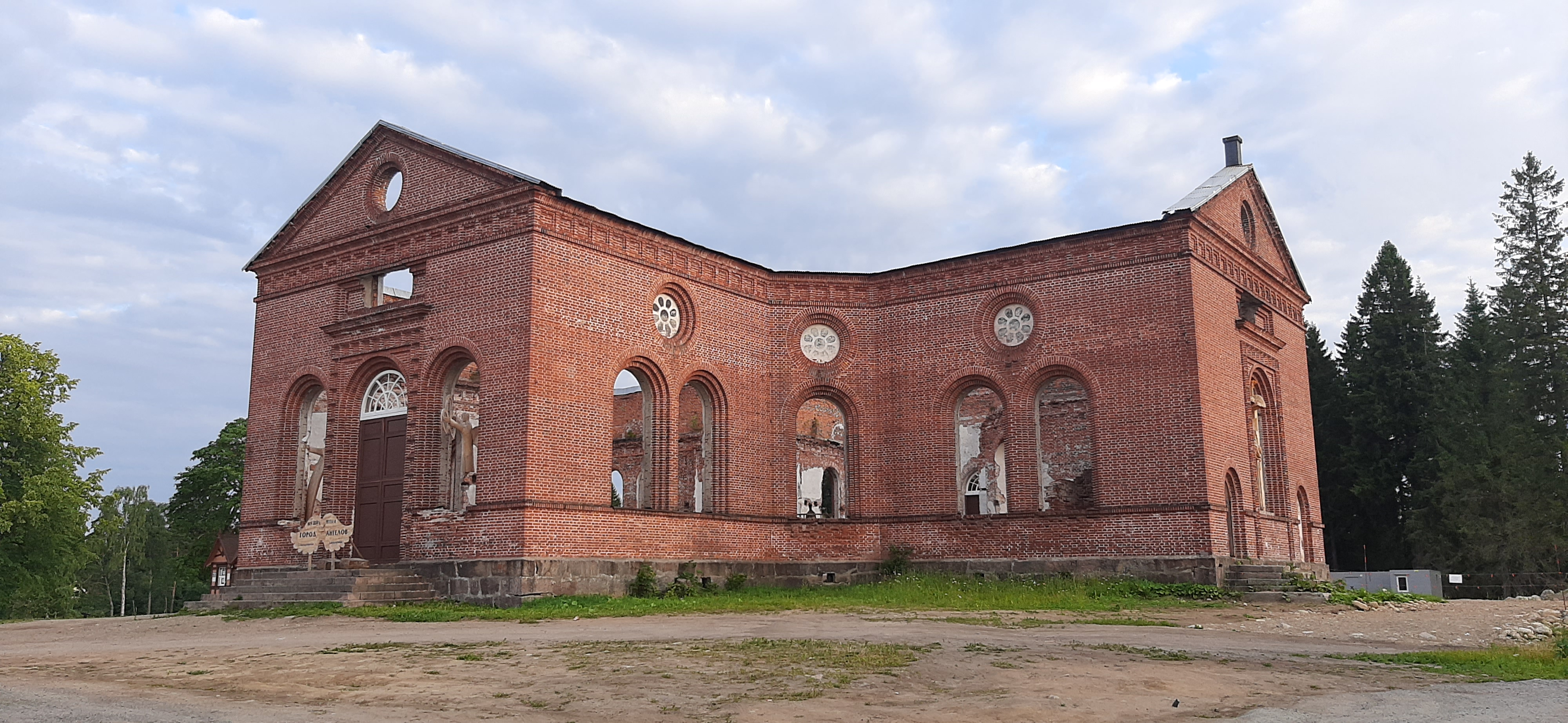
Remains of the church

In 1845, with the financial assistance of the landowner Alexander Kushelev-Bezborodko, the construction of a new Lutheran church in Yakkima was started. The church was designed by Carl Ludvig Engel. The construction took five years and the church was consecrated on 19 October 1851. In 1977 the church was gutted in a fire.
