= Siege of Dorpat (1558) =

Part of the Livonian War

- Part of the Livonian War
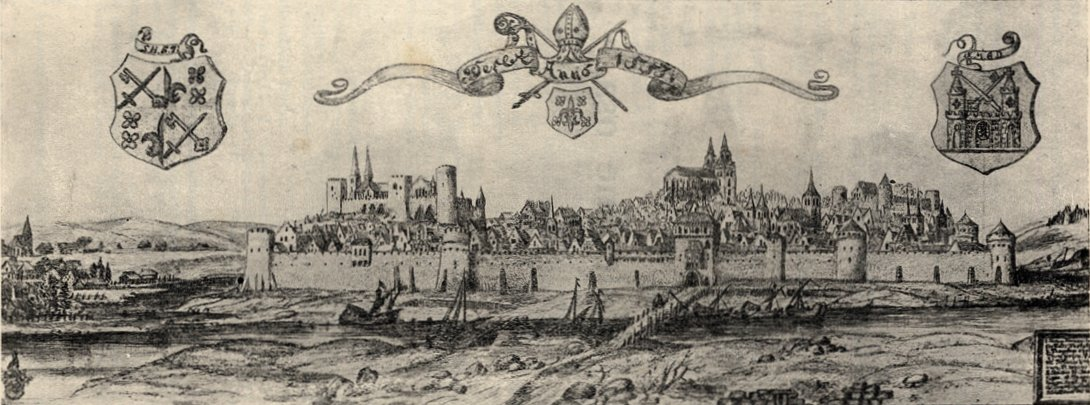
- Dorpat on an engraving of the middle of the 16th century
Date	8 – 18 July 1558
Location	Dorpat, Livonia (now Estonia)
Result	Russian victory
Territorial changes	Russian occupation of Eastern Livonia

Belligerents
Livonian Confederation	Tsardom of Russia • Circassians

Commanders and leaders
Herman Weyland (surrendered)	Petr Shuisky

Strength
2,000 Mercenaries	8,000–40,000 total: 500 Streltsy

Casualties and losses
Light 700 cannons and 60,000 thalers	Light

The siege of Dorpat (Estonian: Drepti Piiramine; Russian: Осада Дрепта) was a Russian siege of the Livonian city of Dorpat (in modern-day eastern Estonia) from July 1558, during the Livonian War.

== Background ==
After the fall of Neuhausen, the Russians opened the way to the main goal of the entire campaign - Dorpat. The Russians did not hesitate and immediately began to march. The fortress of Warbeck stood in their way, but it was taken without much effort. Russians appeared near Dorpat overshadowed the troops of the order and the army under the command of Johann Wilhelm von Fürstenberg did not dare to give battle, and a sharp retreat began, further data vary: according to Livonian data, due to the heat, the Russians did not pursue them. According to Russian data, a detachment from the Tatars and yartoul caught up with the German rearguard and cut it clean.

== Siege ==
On the morning of July 8, Russians appeared under the walls of the city, stunning residents and defenders, Livonian sources name the number of Russians - 300,000 men and cavalry (these figures are obviously overstated). After that, the Russians followed the already worked-out scenario, shelled the city and dug trenches, According to the Livonian adventurer Kruse, the Streltsy showed themselves very well in these operations, who repelled several attacks by the Livonians. The number of Russian artillery was also at a high level, 8 copper mortars and 2 flamethrowers, which set up hell in Dorpat. On July 11, the Russians broke through the wall in the city and many civilians were killed by bombing. There were no attempts to rescue from the outside, the commander of the rest of the army rejected requests to try to unblock the city, arguing that there were much more Russians. The master of the city fell into despair, the only attempt at salvation was in negotiations.

== Conversation ==
Russian said that if the city was not surrendered within three days, they would cut out all its inhabitants, German, knowing the Russians and Shuisky, understood that it was vomit, but he was still wary On July 15, the bishop set conditions for the Russians: "1) The Sovereign gives the Bishop the Falkenau monastery with its volosts, a house and a garden in Dorpat; 2) the Clergy and Latin churches with their property will be under his authority; 3) Nobles who want to be subjects of Russia quietly own their castles and lands; 4) German soldiers will leave cities with weapons and belongings; 5) for twelve days, every Dorpat resident is free to go wherever he wants; 6) the Augsburg confession remains the main one and without any changes; 7) The German magistrate manages everything as it was, without losing either his rights or his income; 8) merchants trade freely and without duties with Germany and Russia; 9) not to take anyone out of Dorpat to the Moscow region; 10) anyone who wants to move to another land can take or sell the estate; 11) citizens are free from military post; 12) all crimes, the most state, even an insult to the Royal Majesty, are sued by Magistrate officials they are punished with the help of the city court; 13) new citizens they swear an oath to the King and the Magistrate." Prudent Shuisky, authorized by John, did not reject a single article, guided not only by humanity, but also by Politics: it was necessary by mercy, condescension, and a spirit of moderation to weaken the hatred of the Livonians towards Russia which facilitates further conquest.

On July 18, the city fell, the Russians kept their word and treated the local population politely, however, they took the entire artillery (700 cannons and several mortars) and a contribution of 60,000 thalers at the personal request of Ivan the Terrible.

== Aftermath ==
The fall of Dorpat had more impact than the fall of Narva. The whole of eastern Livonia was occupied. In Russian historiography, this period is called the "Fall of the Livonian Fortresses" However, the Russian army was tired, having taken a huge booty, it was shackled, so they decided to stop the great winter raid and the troops went to apartments or houses, preparing for a new campaign.
