= Sevastyanovo, Leningrad Oblast =

Rural locality in Priozersky District, Russia

Coordinates: 61°03′30″N 29°48′20″E

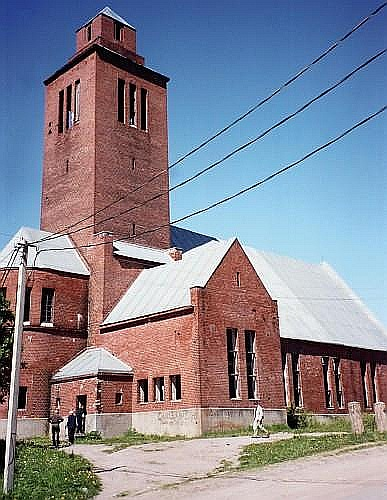
Sevastyanovo Lutheran Church built in 1933. Picture taken in 2002

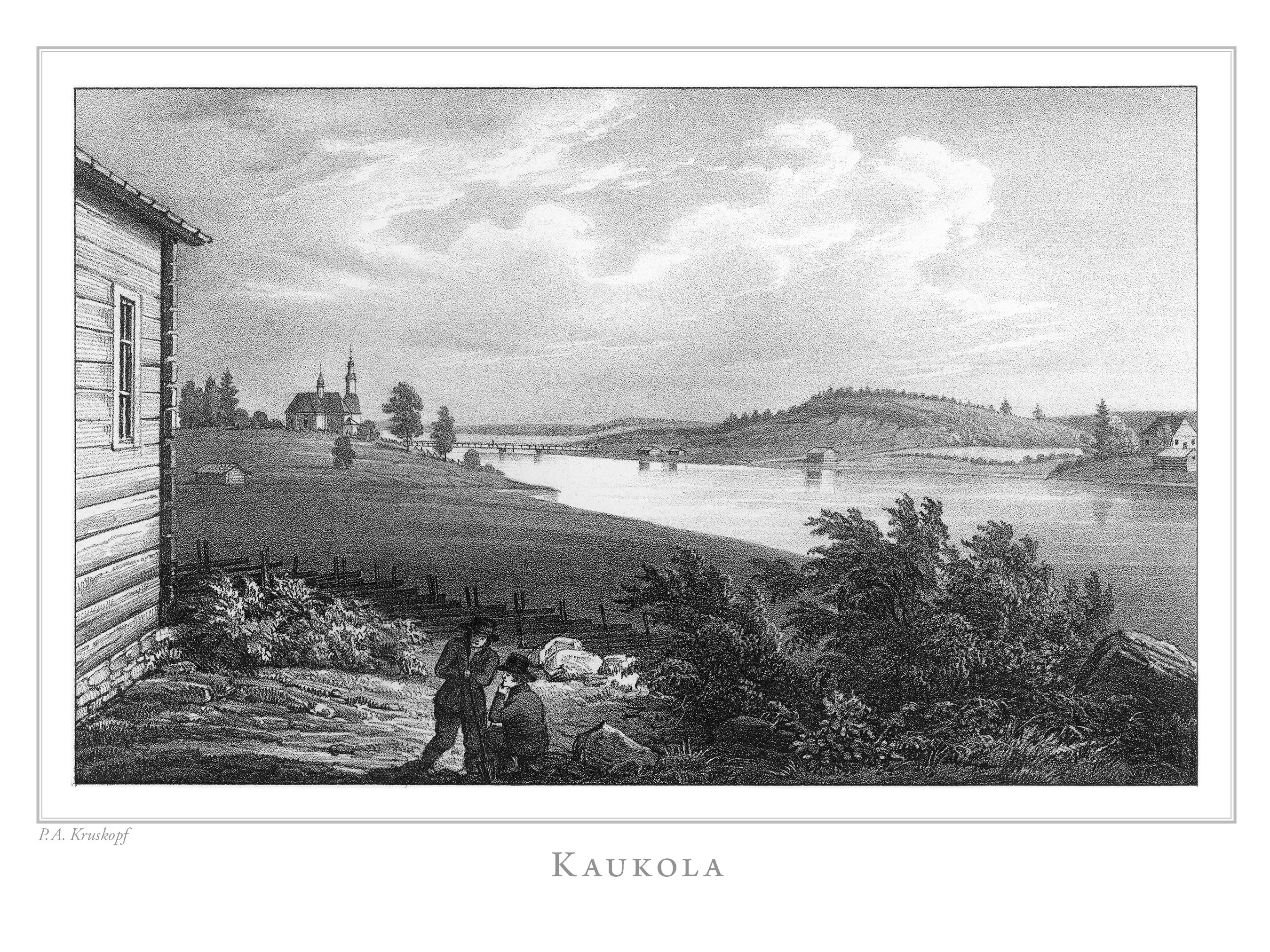
Illustration in Finland framstäldt i teckningar edited by Zacharias Topelius and published 1845-1852.

Sevastyanovo (Russian: Севастья́ново, Finnish: Kaukola) is a settlement on Karelian Isthmus, in Priozersky District of Leningrad Oblast. Until the Winter War and Continuation War, it had been the administrative center of the Kaukola municipality of the Viipuri Province of Finland.
