= Pervomayskoye, Leningrad Oblast =

Human settlement in Pervomaiskoe SP, Vyborgsky District, Leningrad Oblast, Russia

Coordinates: 60°20′N 29°47′E

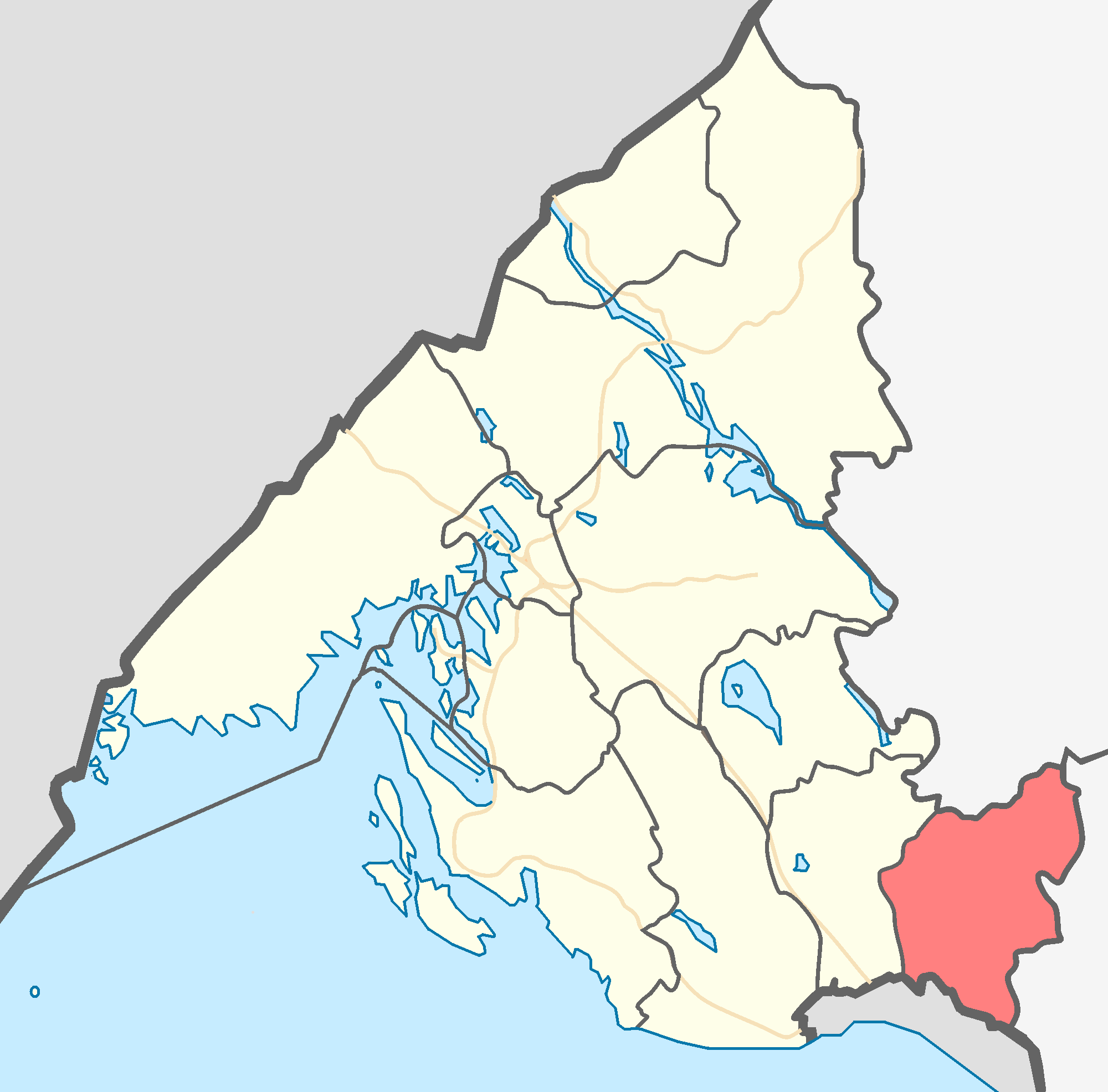
Pervomayskoye Rural Settlement on the map of Vyborgsky Municipal District

Pervomayskoye (Russian: Первома́йское; Finnish: Kivennapa) is a rural locality (a settlement) in Vyborgsky District of Leningrad Oblast, Russia, located on the Karelian Isthmus, 60 kilometers (37 mi) northwest of St. Petersburg. It serves as the administrative center of Pervomayskoye Settlement Municipal Formation—an administrative division of the district—as well as of Pervomayskoye Rural Settlement, which that administrative division is municipally incorporated as. Population: 4,469 (2010 Census); 4,496 (2002 Census).

Prior to 1944, Pervomayskoye was a part of Finland. It was then known as Kivennapa.

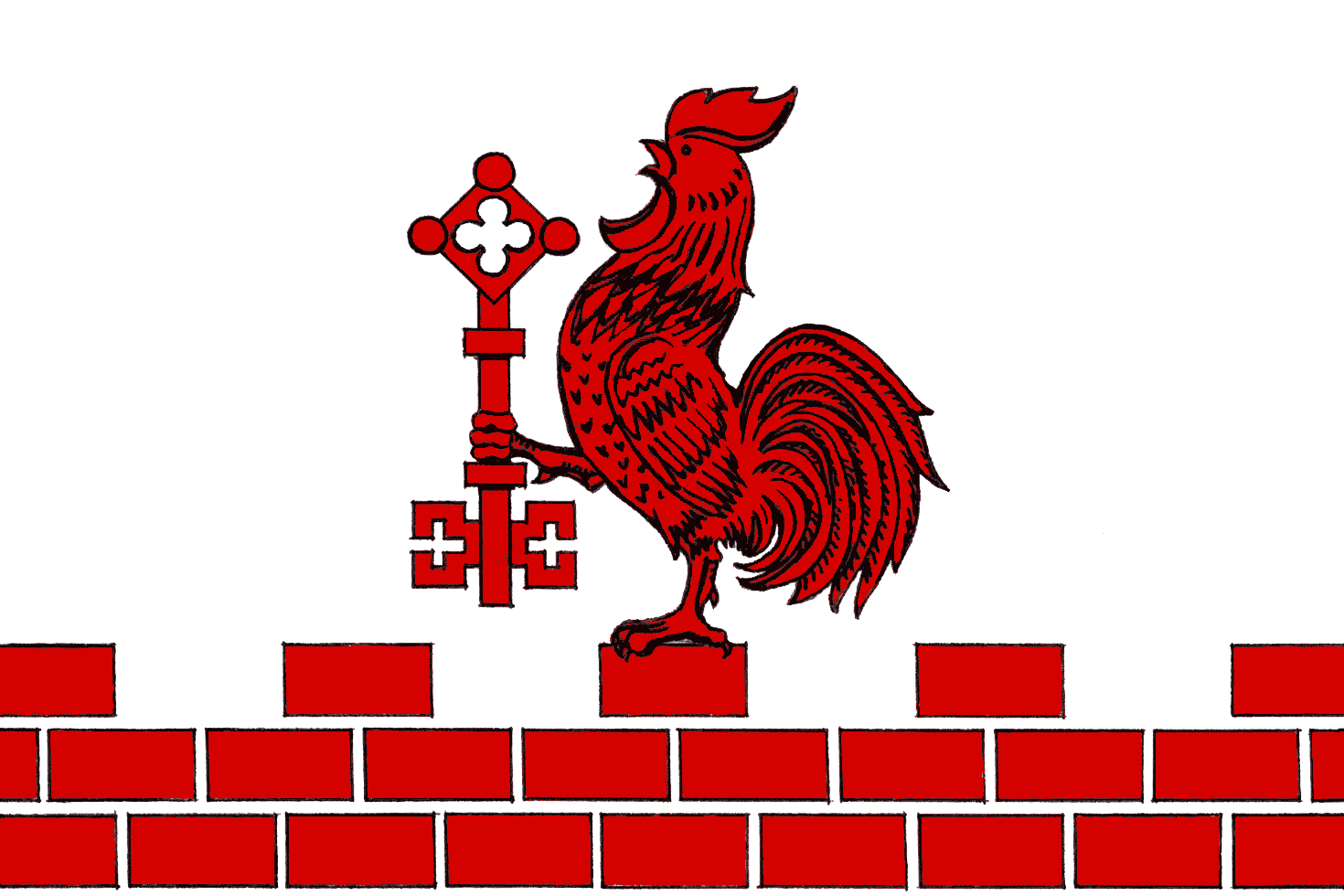
Flag

== History ==
The name of Kivennapa seems to come from an old Scandinavian term for a border fortification, kivo näb, but the foreign term was soon corrupted by the locals into Kivennapa, meaning "rock's navel". The first mention of the settlement comes from 1445 as Kiwinapa, when it was likely already a separate parish. Before that, Kivennapa was a part of the Muolaa parish. The parish was occasionally also called Hanttula or Pihlainen after two other villages in the area, even though Hanttula was mainly located within Muolaa.

The borders of the Kivennapa parish remained unchanged until 1904, when five villages on the coast were separated from it, forming the Terijoki municipality.

Kivennapa was ceded to the Soviet Union in 1944. Its inhabitants were mainly relocated to the Häme Province. It was renamed Pervomayskoye, "First of May", in 1948.

== Notable people ==
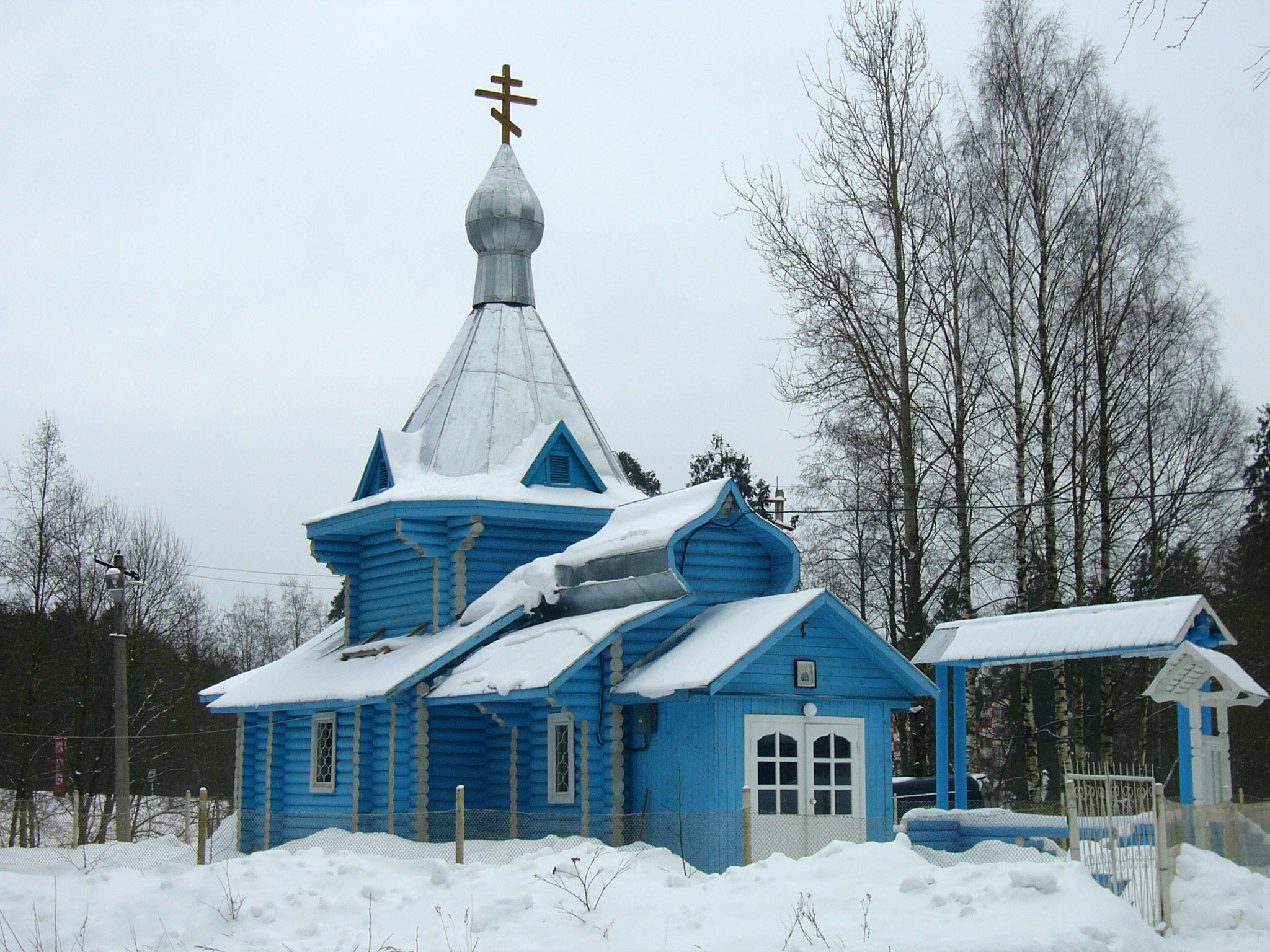
Saint Panteleimon's church (built in 2001)

- Aleksander Strandman (1856-1933), Finnish Senator
- Olavi Paavolainen (1903-1964), Finnish author
