= Lakhdenpokhsky District =

Lakhdenpokhsky District Лахденпохский район (Russian)
- District
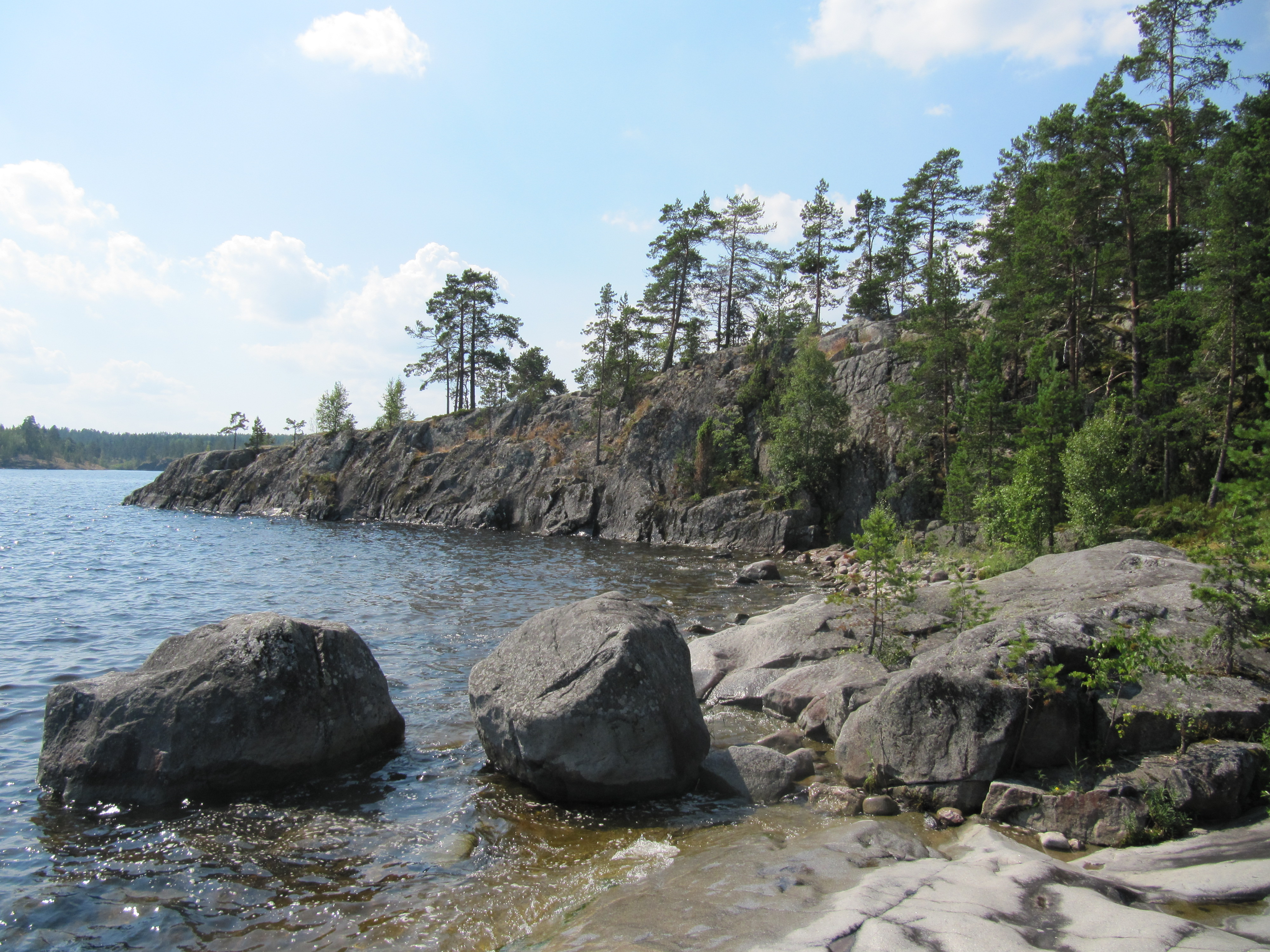
- Koyonsaari Island in Lakhdenpokhsky District

- Flag Coat of arms
- Location of Lakhdenpokhsky District in the Republic of Karelia
- Coordinates: 61°31′N 30°12′E
- Country: Russia
- Federal subject: Republic of Karelia
- Administrative center: Lakhdenpokhya

Area
  - Total: 2,200 km^{2} (850 sq mi)

Population (2010 Census)
  - Total: 14,235
  - Density: 6.5/km^{2} (17/sq mi)
  - Urban: 54.9%
  - Rural: 45.1%

Administrative structure
  - Inhabited localities: 1 cities/towns, 50 rural localities

Municipal structure
  - Municipally incorporated as: Lakhdenpokhsky Municipal District
  - Municipal divisions: 1 urban settlements, 4 rural settlements
- Time zone: UTC+3 (UTC+03:00)
- OKTMO ID: 86618000
- Website: http://www.lahden-mr.ru

Population of Lakhdenpokhsky District
- 2010 Census: 14,235
- 2002 Census: 16,391
- 1989 Census: 18,879
- 1979 Census: 18,381

Lakhdenpokhsky District (Russian: Лахденпо́хский райо́н; Finnish and Karelian: Lahdenpohjan piiri) is an administrative district (raion), one of the fifteen in the Republic of Karelia, Russia. It is located in the southwest of the republic. The area of the district is 2,200 square kilometers (850 sq mi). Its administrative center is the town of Lakhdenpokhya. As of the 2010 Census, the total population of the district was 14,235, with the population of Lakhdenpokhya accounting for 54.9% of that number.

== Administrative and municipal status ==
Within the framework of administrative divisions, Lakhdenpokhsky District is one of the fifteen in the Republic of Karelia and has administrative jurisdiction over one town (Lakhdenpokhya) and fifty rural localities. As a municipal division, the district is incorporated as Lakhdenpokhsky Municipal District. The town of Lakhdenpokhya and one rural locality (the station of Yakkima) are incorporated into an urban settlement, while the remaining forty-nine rural localities are incorporated into four rural settlements within the municipal district. The town of Lakhdenpokhya serves as the administrative center of both the administrative and municipal district.

== See also ==
- Ivar Vidfamne, legendary Swedish king said to have been buried in Lakhdenpokhsky
