= Vyborgsky District, Leningrad Oblast =

Vyborgsky District Выборгский район (Russian)
- District
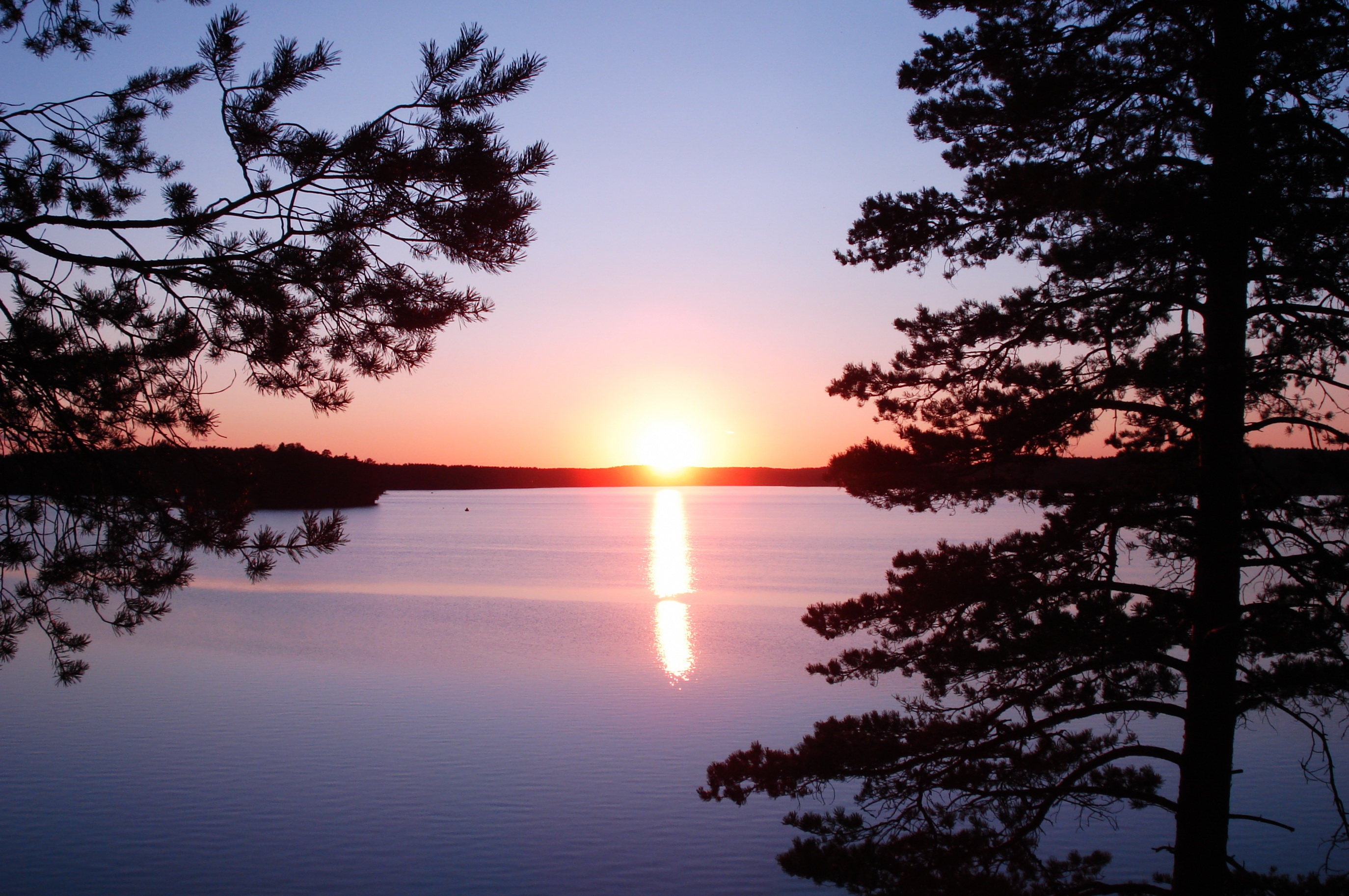
- Lake Zerkalnoye in Vyborgsky District

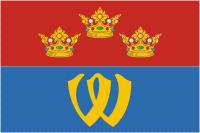
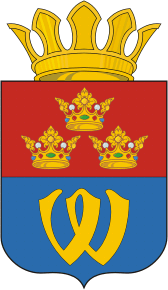
- Flag Coat of arms

- Location of Vyborgsky District in Leningrad Oblast
- Coordinates: 60°42′33″N 28°44′39″E
- Country: Russia
- Federal subject: Leningrad Oblast
- Established: March 1940
- Administrative center: Vyborg

Area
  - Total: 7,475 km^{2} (2,886 sq mi)

Population (2010 Census)
  - Total: 120,446
  - Density: 16.11/km^{2} (41.73/sq mi)
  - Urban: 43.3%
  - Rural: 56.7%

Administrative structure
  - Administrative divisions: 5 Settlement municipal formations (towns), 2 Settlement municipal formations (urban-type settlements), 5 Settlement municipal formations (rural settlements)
  - Inhabited localities: 5 cities/towns, 3 urban-type settlements, 173 rural localities

Municipal structure
  - Municipally incorporated as: Vyborgsky Municipal District
  - Municipal divisions: 7 urban settlements, 5 rural settlements
- Time zone: UTC+3 (MSK)
- OKTMO ID: 41615000
- Website: http://www.vbglenobl.ru/

Vyborgsky District (Russian: Вы́боргский райо́н, romanized: Výborgskiy raión, IPA: [ˈvɨbərkskʲɪj rɐˈjɵn]) is an administrative and municipal district (raion), one of the seventeen in Leningrad Oblast, Russia. It is located in the northwest of the oblast on the Karelian Isthmus and borders with Priozersky District in the northeast, Vsevolozhsky District in the east, Kurortny District of the federal city of St. Petersburg in the south, Kymenlaakso and South Karelia regions of Finland in the northwest, and Lakhdenpokhsky District of the Republic of Karelia in the north. From the southwest, the district is limited by the Gulf of Finland. The area of the district is 7,475.472 square kilometers (2,886.296 sq mi). Its administrative center is the town of Vyborg. Population (excluding the administrative center): 120,446 (2010 census); 113,748 (2002 Census); 108,571 (1989 Soviet census).

== Geography ==
The district occupies the southwestern part of the Karelian Isthmus. The landscape is hilly and forested, with many rock formations. The northern part of the district lies in the basin of the Vuoksi River, which drains into Lake Ladoga. The Vuoksi itself crosses the district from northwest to southeast. Other rivers in the district, the largest of which are the Gryaznovka and the Sestra, drain directly into the Gulf of Finland. There are many lakes in the district, especially in the basin of the Vuoksi. Lake Glubokoye is the largest one.

== History ==
The western part of the Karelian Isthmus, inhabited by Karelians and Finns, historically lay between Russia and Sweden (later Russia and Finland) and changed hands on a regular basis. Vyborg was founded in 1293 as a Swedish fortress for protection from the Novgorod Republic. In 1323, the Treaty of Nöteborg established the border between Novgorod and Sweden along the Sestra River. This border corresponds to the current southern limits of Vyborgsky District. In 1403, Vyborg was chartered. The Novgorod Republic besieged Vyborg in 1411, and the Grand Duchy of Moscow, which by then annexed Novgorod, besieged it in 1495, but on both occasions the fortress was not conquered. According to the Treaty of Stolbovo, the whole Karelian Isthmus was ceded to Sweden and the border moved southeast. In 1710, during the Great Northern War, the troops of Tsar Peter the Great conquered Vyborg, and eventually the whole area was annexed to Russia. This was confirmed by the Treaty of Nystad in 1721.

In the course of the administrative reform carried out in 1708 by Peter the Great, the area was included into Ingermanland Governorate (known since 1710 as Saint Petersburg Governorate). In 1719, it became a part of Vyborg Province, and in 1744, Vyborg Governorate with the seat in Vyborg was established. In 1783, it was transformed into Vyborg Viceroyalty, then in 1801 back into Vyborg Governorate. In 1801, Vyborg Governorate was renamed Finland Governorate, and in 1812, it was renamed back and included into the Grand Duchy of Finland, which had previously been ceded to Russia by Sweden. After 1812, it was known as the Viipuri Province. On July 17, 1919, the Viipuri Province became a part of independent Finland. The border between Finland and Soviet Union was drawn along the Sestra River.

After the Winter War, Finland ceded this territory to the Soviet Union by the terms of the Moscow Peace Treaty. The territory was recaptured by Finns between 1941 and 1944 during the Continuation War but was again ceded to the Soviets after the Moscow Armistice. The secession was formalized after signing of the Paris Peace Treaty in 1947. Viipuri Province was divided, with the larger part ceded to Soviet Union and the smaller part remaining in Finland. The population was resettled to Finland and replaced by migrants from Central Russia.

Vyborgsky District with the administrative center in Vyborg was established in March 1940 as a part of the Karelian Autonomous Soviet Socialist Republic (Karelian ASSR). On March 31, 1940, the Karelian ASSR was transformed into the Karelo-Finnish Soviet Socialist Republic. On November 24, 1944, Vyborgsky District was transferred from Karelo-Finnish Soviet Socialist Republic to Leningrad Oblast.

Another district established in March 1940 was Yaskinsky District with the administrative center in the work settlement of Yaski (Jääski). It was a part of the Karelian ASSR, and of the Karelo-Finnish Soviet Socialist Republic after March 31, 1940. On November 24, 1944, Yaskinsky District was transferred from Karelo-Finnish Soviet Socialist Republic to Leningrad Oblast. On October 1, 1948, the district was renamed Lesogorsky, and on January 13, 1949, all localities whose names originated in Finnish were renamed using Russian names. In particular, Yaski was renamed Lesogorsky and Enso was renamed Svetogorsk. On December 9, 1960, Lesogorsky District was abolished and merged into Vyborgsky District.

On May 16, 1940, Kannelyarvsky District with the administrative center in the selo of Kennelyarvi (Kanneljärvi) was established as well. It was a part of Leningrad Oblast. On August 22, 1945, the administrative center of the district was moved from Kennelyarvi to the selo of Rayvola (Raivola) and the district was renamed Rayvolovsky. On October 1, 1948, the district was renamed Roshchinsky, and on January 12, 1949, all localities whose names originated in Finnish were renamed using Russian names. In particular, Rayvola was renamed Roshchino. On July 31, 1959, Roshchino was granted urban-type settlement status. On February 1, 1963, Roshchinsky District was abolished and merged into Vyborgsky District.

On May 16, 1940, Rautovsky District with the administrative center in the suburban settlement of Rautu was also established. It was a part of Leningrad Oblast. On October 1, 1948, the district was renamed Sosnovsky and on January 13, 1949, all localities whose names originated in Finnish were renamed using Russian names. In particular, Rautu was renamed Sosnovo. On December 9, 1960, Sosnovsky District was abolished and split between Roshchinsky and Priozersky Districts.

Another district established on May 16, 1940 was Koyvistovsky District with the administrative center in the town of Koyvisto (Koivisto). It was a part of Leningrad Oblast. On October 1, 1948, the district was renamed Primorsky and on January 13, 1949, all localities whose names originated in Finnish were renamed using Russian names. In particular, Koyvisto was renamed Primorsk. On April 3, 1954, Primorsky District was abolished and merged into Roshchinsky District.

== Restricted access ==
A 20–35-kilometer (12–22 mi) wide stretch of land in the district to the west of the Vyborg–Khiytola railway, as well as the islands and shores of the Vyborg Bay, belong to the strictly guarded zone of the border control. In 1993-2006, the zone was formally 5-kilometer (3.1 mi) wide, and was further expanded in 2006. Visiting the zone is forbidden without a permit issued by the Federal Security Service.

== Economy ==
=== Industry ===
The economy of the district is dominated by timber industry, including several paper mills. Additionally, construction and food industries are present, as well as a shipyard in Vyborg.

=== Agriculture ===
The main agricultural specializations in the district are cattle breeding with meat and milk production, poultry breeding with egg production, and fish farming.

=== Transportation ===
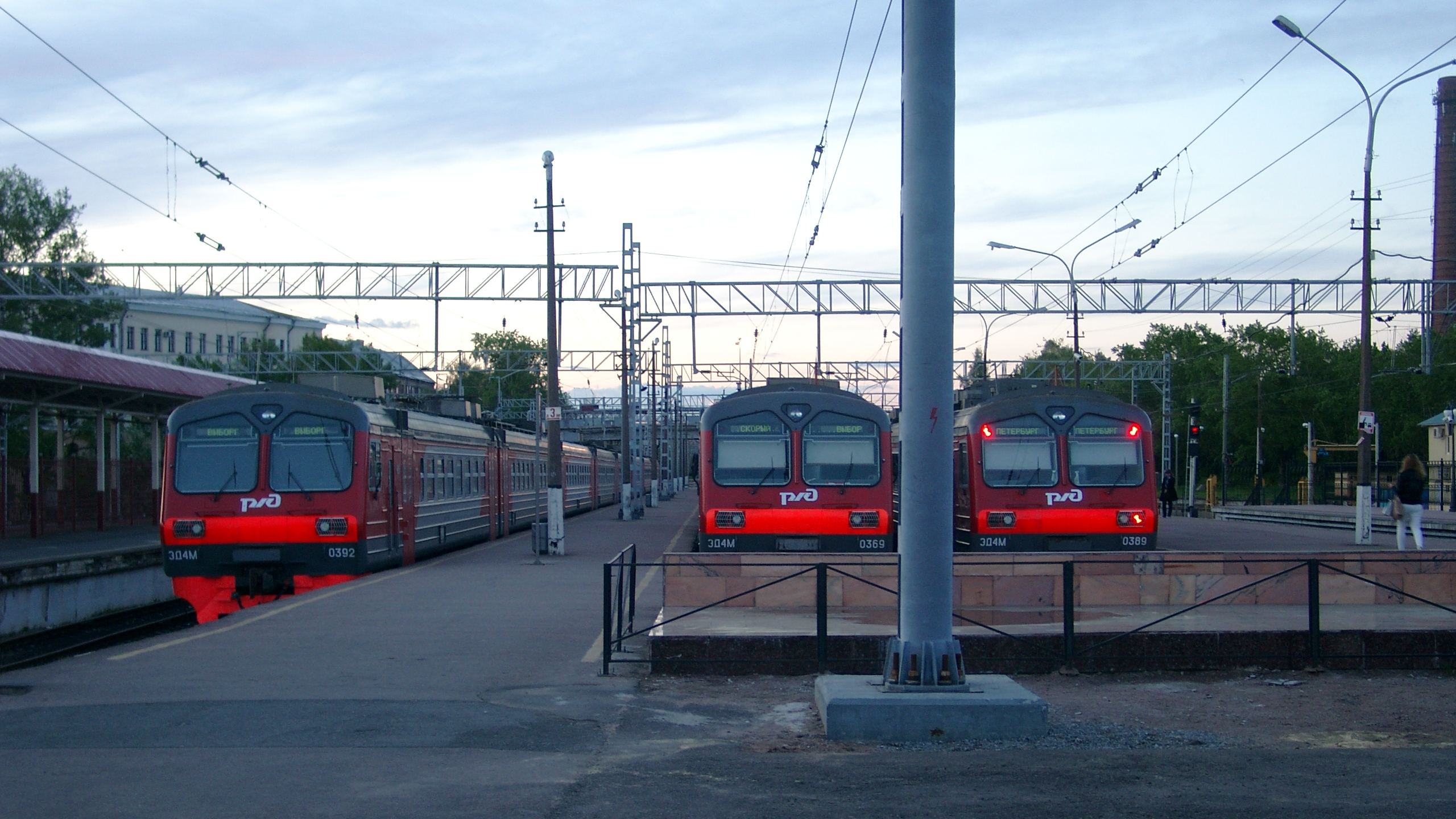
Vyborg train station

A number of railways pass through the district. The main line between St. Petersburg and Helsinki, the Riihimäki – Saint Petersburg Railway, runs through Vyborg. Another line connecting St. Petersburg and Vyborg follows the coastline of the Gulf of Finland, passing Primorsk. Vyborg is connected to Khiytola via Kamennogorsk. This is the old Vyborg–Joensuu railroad. In Kamennogorsk, a railway branches up north to Svetogorsk; its stretch beyond Svetogorsk to the state border is disused. All these railways are served by suburban trains originating from the Finland Station of St. Petersburg and from Vyborg. In addition, there are daily connections between St. Petersburg and Helsinki.

The M10 highway which connects Moscow and St. Petersburg with Finland crosses the district and passes Vyborg, where it sharply turns to the west and proceeds to the state border. The road network in the district was mostly constructed when Vyborg region was a part of Finland before 1940 and is sufficiently dense and reliable. In particular, several roads connect Vyborg with St. Petersburg and one of these roads follows the coastline. Other roads connect Kamennogorsk with Vyborg and Melnikovo, as well as the coastal areas with Sosnovo and Melnikovo.

The Saimaa Canal was built in the mid-19th century to provide passenger and cargo navigation between Lake Saimaa and the Gulf of Finland. After having been reconstructed several times the canal is still in use today. The Russian part of the canal, which begins in the town of Vyborg, lies in Vyborgsky District.

Vyborg, Primorsk, and Vysotsk are major sea port terminals.

There are three border control points for vehicles, one on the railroad, and two more in the port terminals on the territory of the district.

The Baltic Pipeline System crosses the district. In Primorsk, oil is pumped to the oil tankers.

== Culture and recreation ==
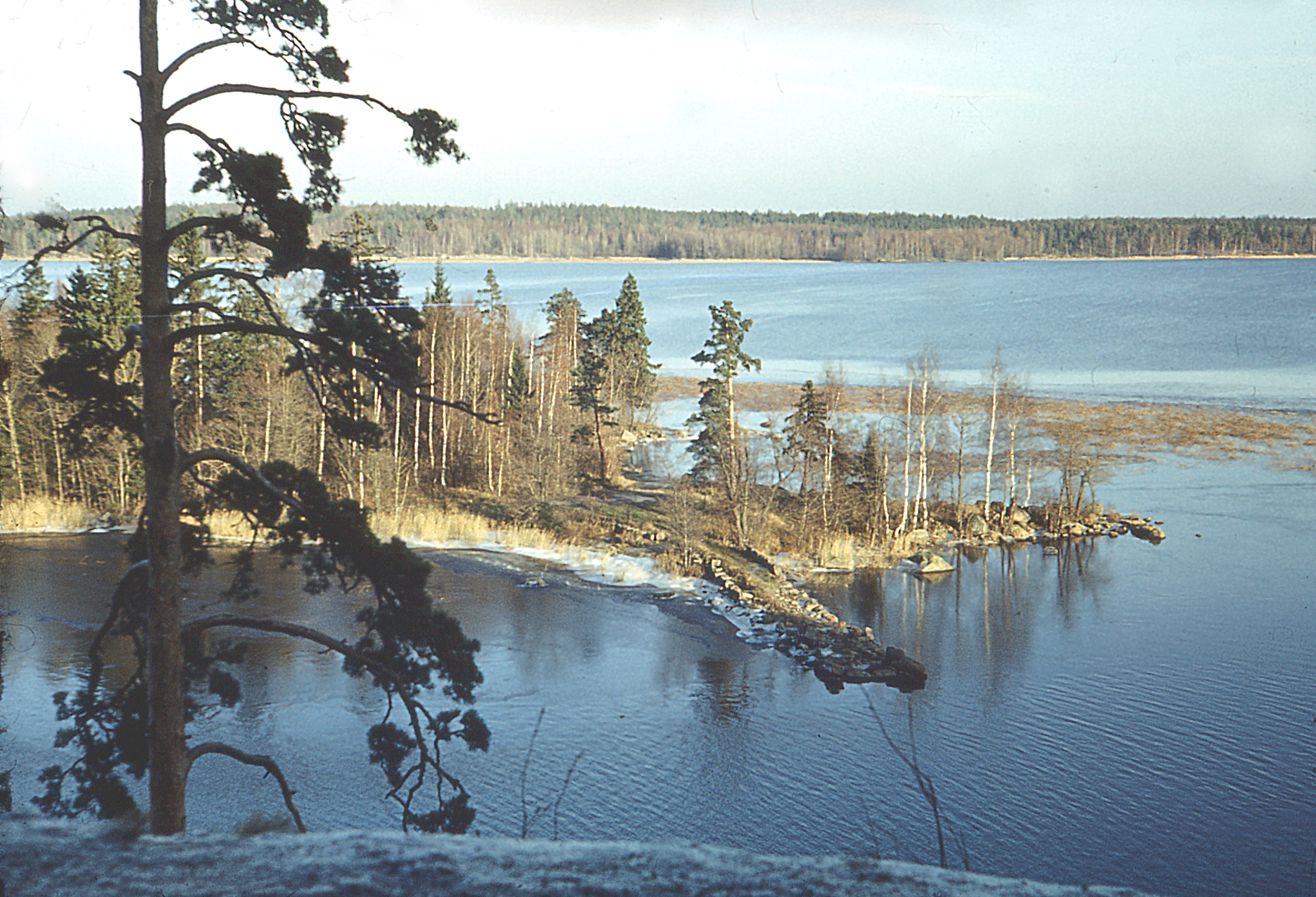
Monrepos in Vyborg

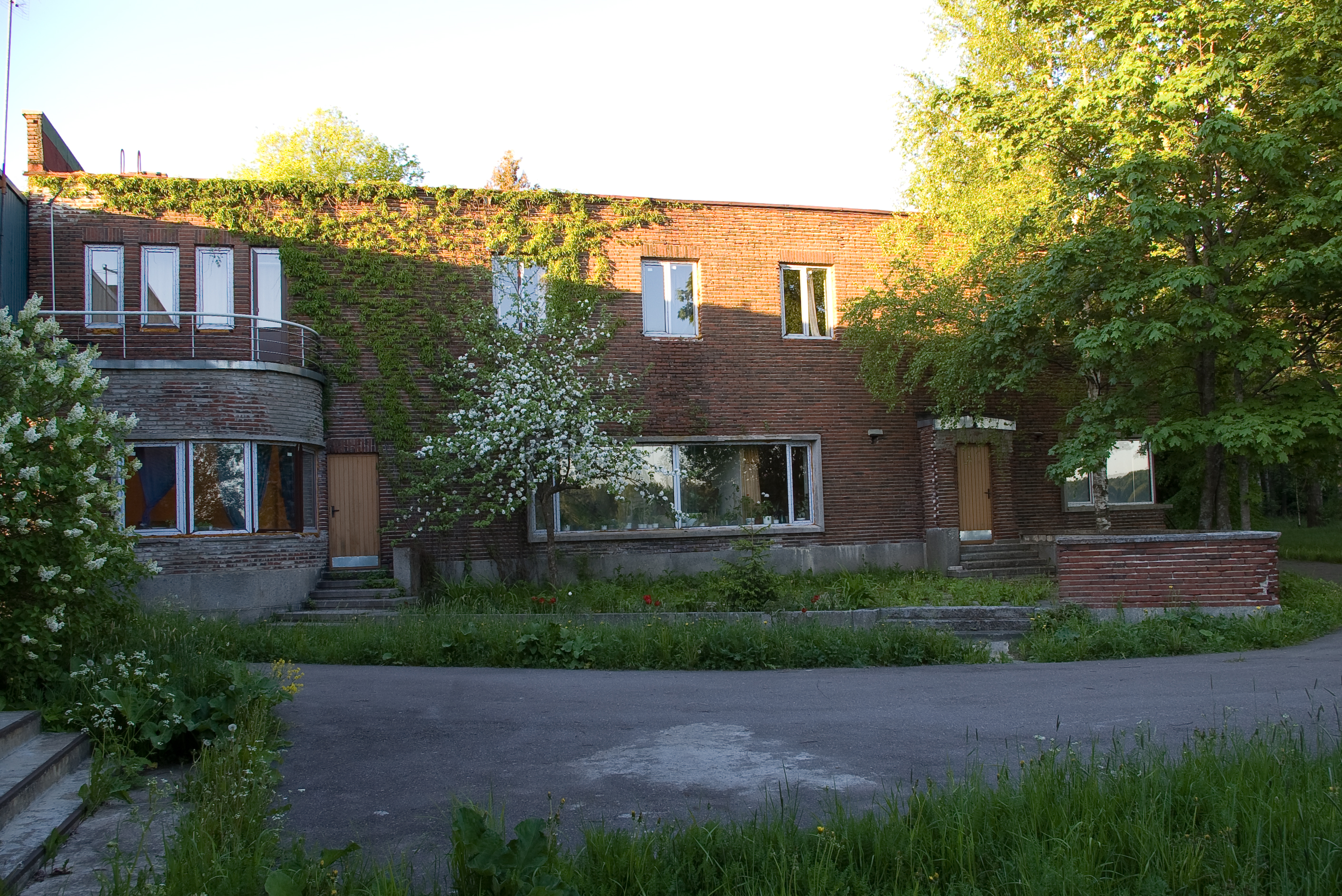
Finnish villa (1930) in Svetogorsk

The district contains 130 cultural heritage monuments of federal significance (116 of which are in Vyborg) and additionally 146 objects classified as cultural and historical heritage of local significance (83 in Vyborg). The federally protected monuments include the Vyborg Castle, the Mon Repos park, one of the best preserved English landscape parks in Russia, the building of the Viipuri Library designed by Alvar Aalto, and many old buildings in the center of Vyborg, including the St. Hyacinth Church. In general, Vyborg has one of the best preserved medieval centers among all towns in Russia.
