= Priozersky =

Priozersky (masculine), Priozerskaya (feminine), or Priozerskoye (neuter) may refer to:

- Priozersky District, a district of Leningrad Oblast, Russia
- Priozerskoye Urban Settlement, a municipal formation corresponding to Priozerskoye Settlement Municipal Formation, an administrative division of Priozersky District of Leningrad Oblast, Russia
- Priozerskoye (rural locality), a rural locality (a selo) in Stavropol Krai, Russia
