= Sestra (Leningrad Oblast) =

Coordinates: 60°21′33″N 30°04′24″E

Sestra Сестра Rajajoki
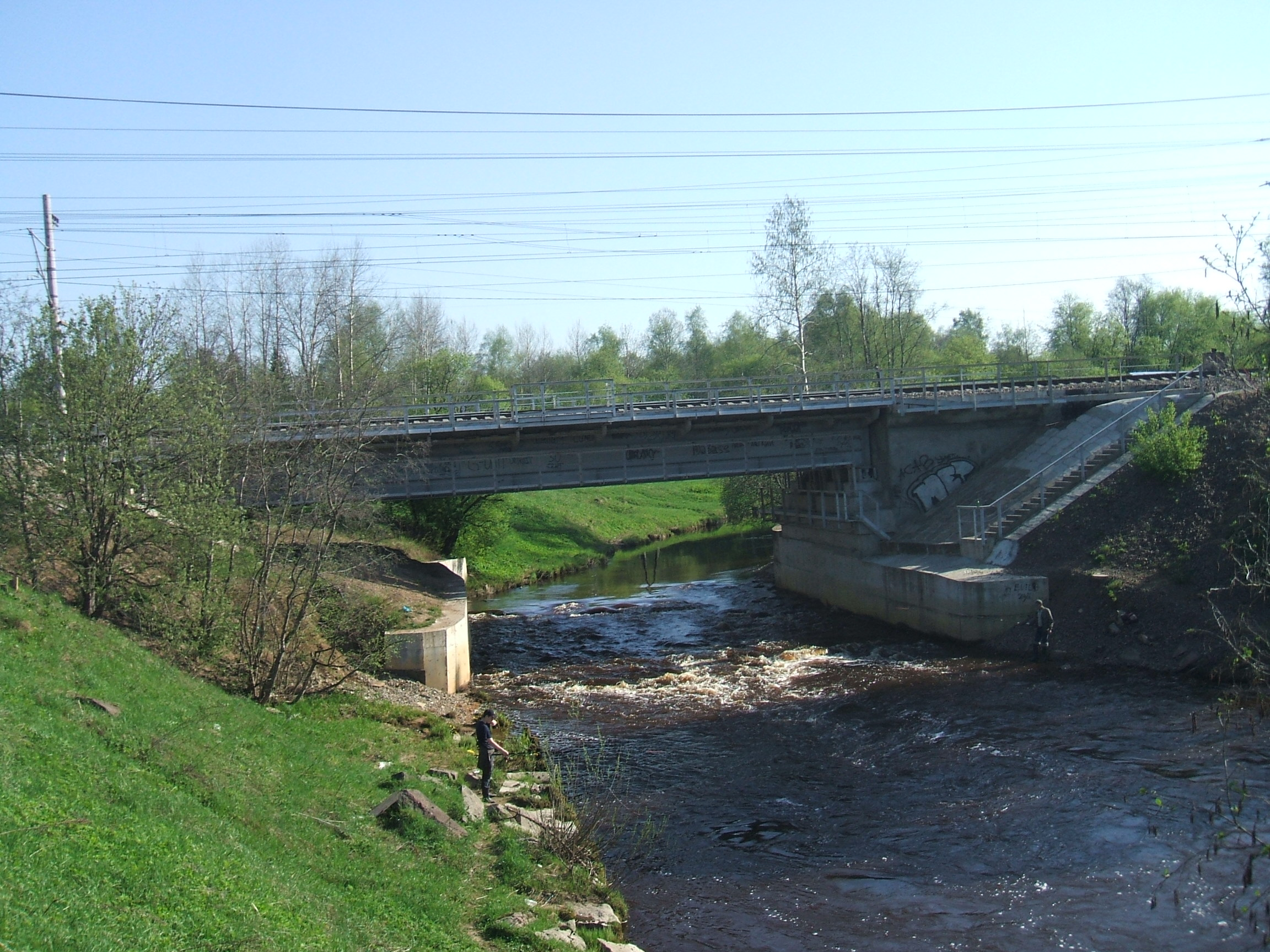
- The railway bridge over the Sestra in Beloostrov

Location
- Country: Russia

Physical characteristics
- Mouth
  - location: Gulf of Finland
- Length: 74 km (46 mi)
- Basin size: 399 km^{2} (154 sq mi)

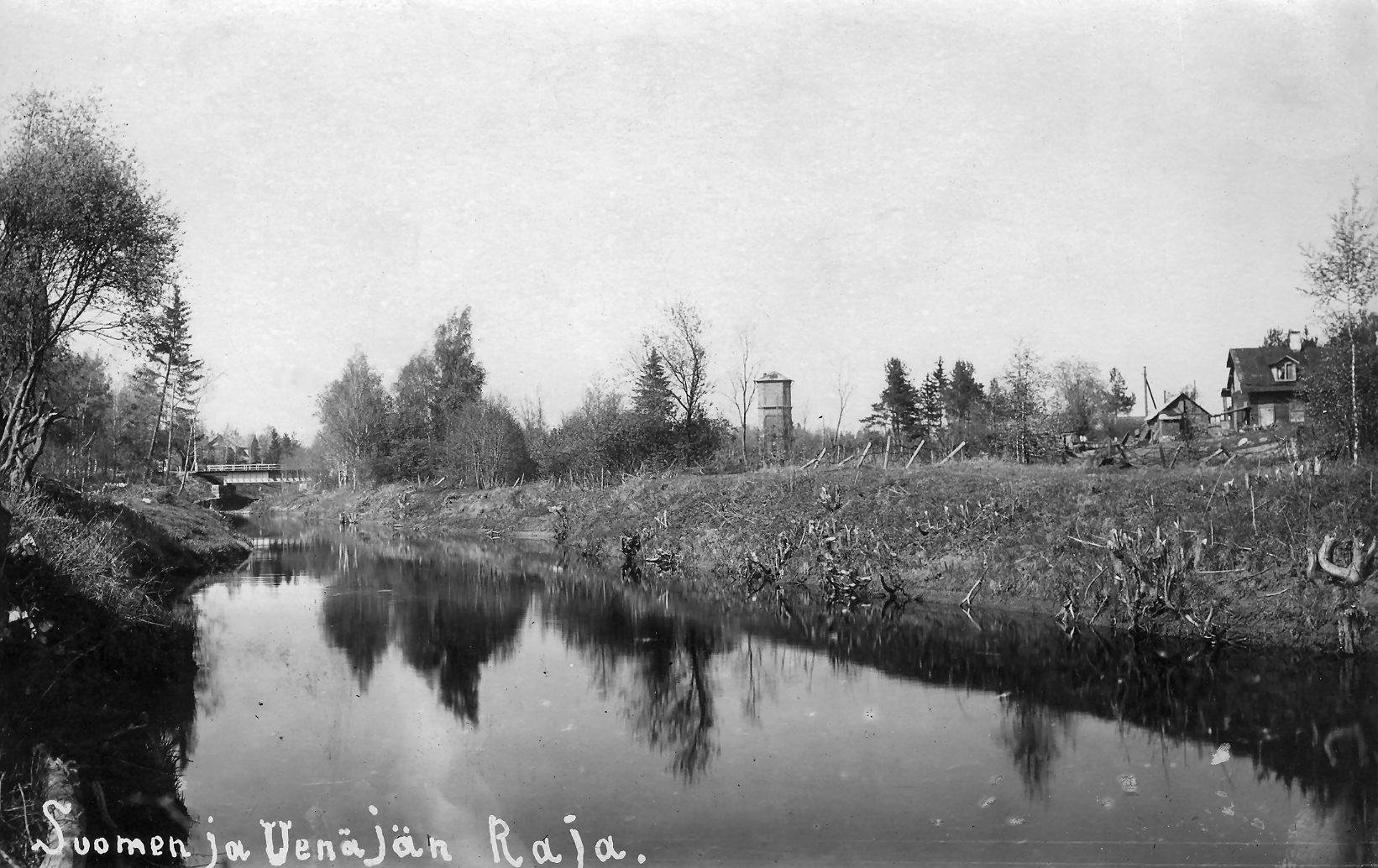
Sestra river/Rajajoki in the 1920s. To the left is Finland, to the right is Russia. In the background the railway line Helsinki-Viipuri-St Petersburg.

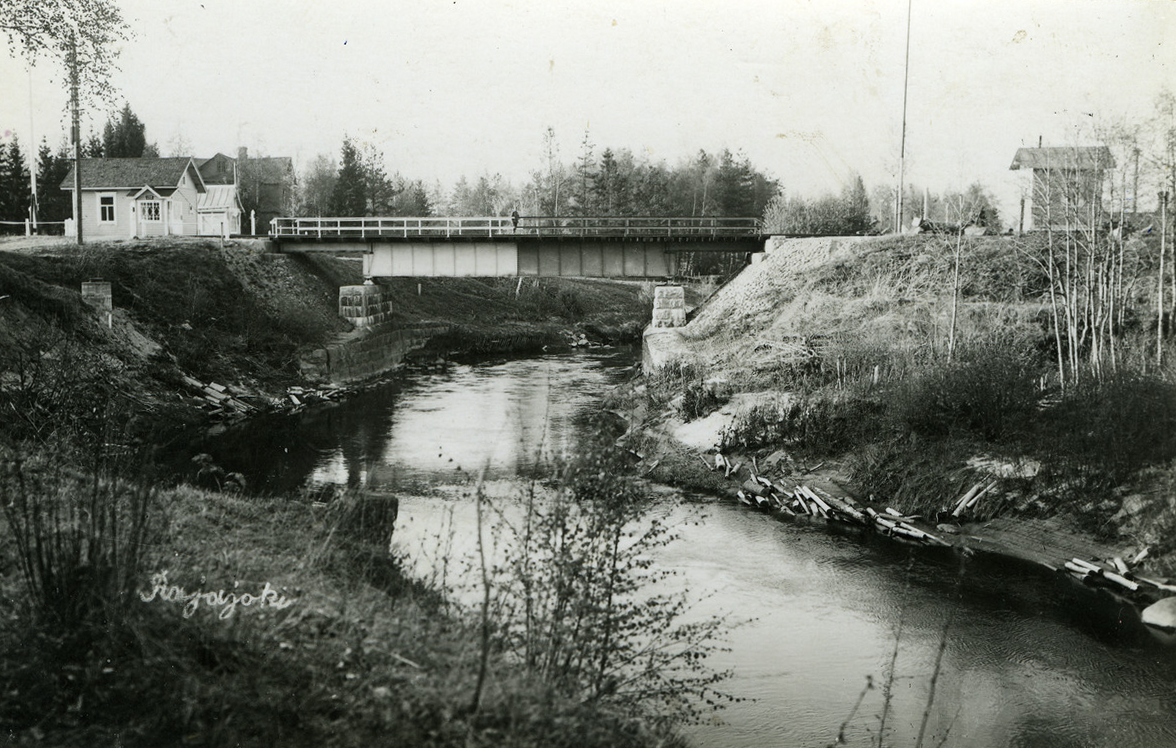
A closer look at the border railway bridge

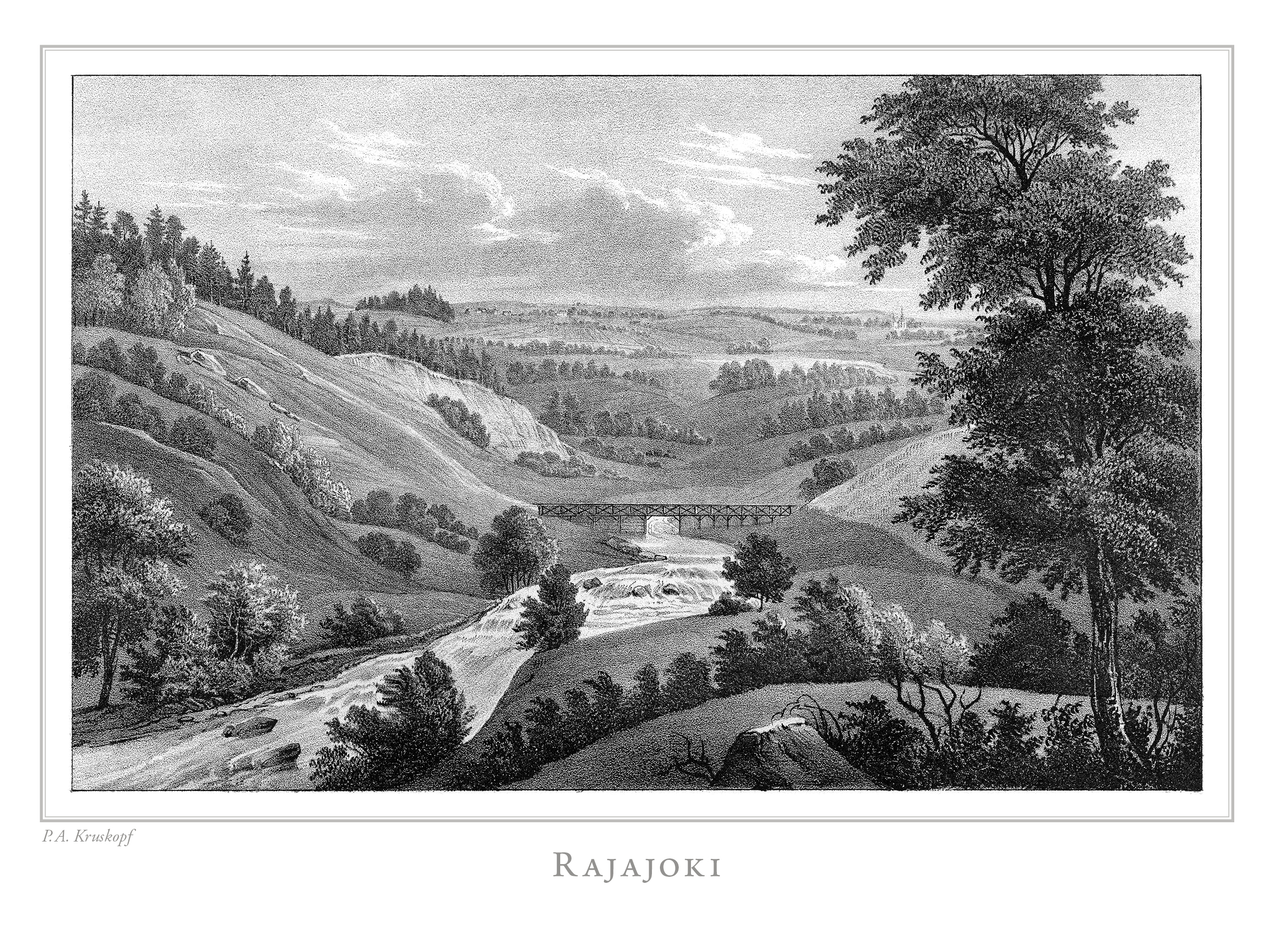
Illustration in Finland framstäldt i teckningar edited by Zacharias Topelius and published 1845-1852.

The Sestra (Russian: Сестра; Finnish: Rajajoki or Siestarjoki; Swedish: Systerbäck) is a river in Vsevolozhsky and Vyborgsky Districts of Leningrad Oblast and Kurortny District of Saint Petersburg, Russia. The length of the Sestra is 74 kilometres (46 mi), and the area of its basin is 399 square kilometres (154 mi^{2}).

The Sestra flows over the Karelian Isthmus. The source of the river is in swamps west of the settlement of Vaskelovo, and the Sestra flows in the general direction south, having its mouth in the town of Sestroretsk. It used to fall into the Gulf of Finland until the early 18th century. After the construction of a dam for the needs of the munitions factory in Sestroretsk, a part of the river was turned into a reservoir called Sestroretsky Razliv (Sestroretsk Overflow), 2 metres (7 ft) deep with an area of 10.6 square kilometres (4.1 mi^{2}). Since then, the Sestra River has been flowing into this reservoir. The Sestroretsk Overflow is separated from the Gulf of Finland with a ridge of artificial sand dunes. Excess water is dumped into the Gulf of Finland through a canal, which is 4.8 kilometres (3.0 mi) long.

The Sestra served as a natural border between Russia and Sweden (1323–1617), an internal border of the Russian Empire between the Grand Duchy of Finland and Saint Petersburg Governorate (1812–1917), and international border between the USSR and Finland (1917–1940). It currently serves as a border between Vsevolozhsky (east, formerly Soviet Union) and Vyborgsky (west, formerly Finland) districts of Leningrad Oblast.
