= Mikko Sipponen =

Finnish politician

Mikko Sipponen (2 July 1869, Valkjärvi – 17 May 1939) was a Finnish farmer, lay preacher and politician. He was a Member of the Parliament of Finland from 1907 to 1909, representing the Finnish Party.
