= Pietari Kuisma =

Finnish farmer and politician (1841–1925)

Petter (Pietari) Kuisma (10 August 1841 – 16 November 1925) was a Finnish farmer and politician, born in Antrea. He was a member of the Diet of Finland in 1906 and of the Parliament of Finland from 1907 to 1908, representing the Young Finnish Party.
