= Erik Pöysti =

Finnish politician

Erik Pöysti (17 September 1849, Antrea – 8 March 1919) was a Finnish farmer, lay preacher and politician. He was a Member of the Diet of Finland from 1882 to 1891 and in 1897 and a Member of the Parliament of Finland from 1908 to 1909, representing the Finnish Party.
