= Priozersky District =

Priozersky District Приозерский район (Russian)
- District
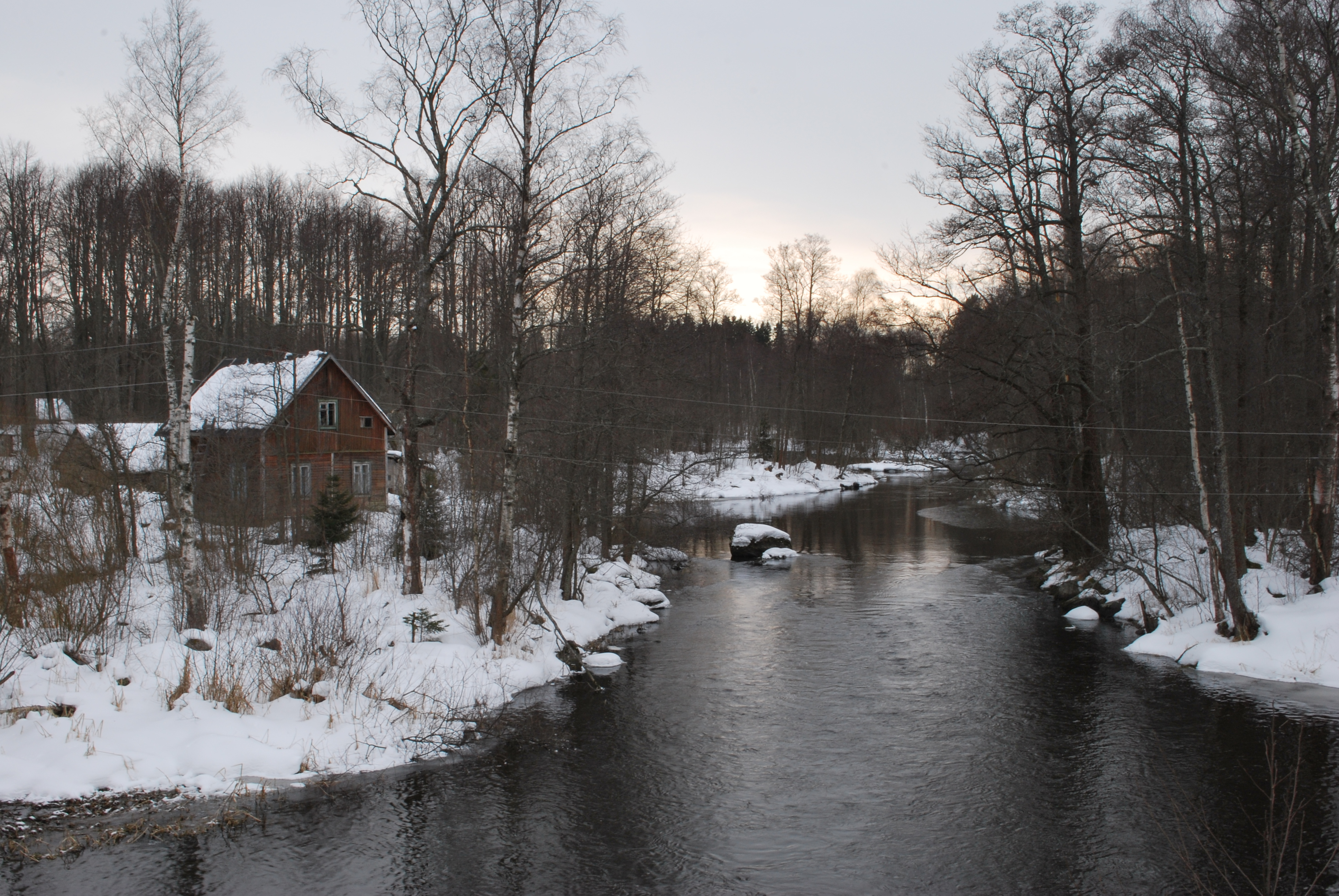
- The Tikhaya River near Brigadnoye in Priozersky District

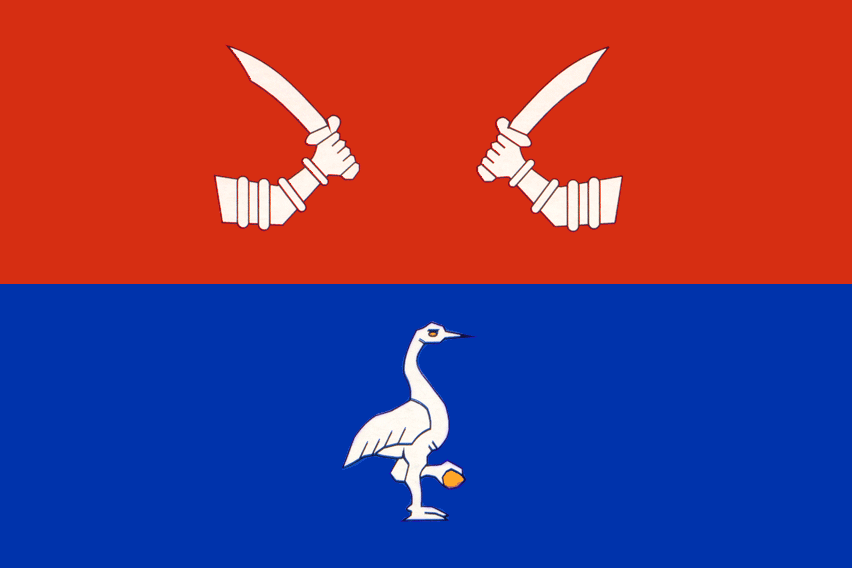
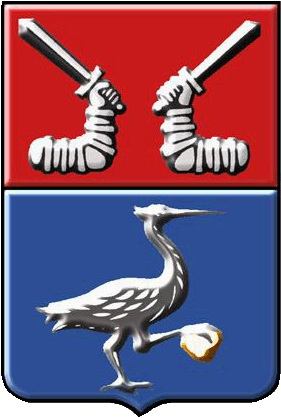
- Flag Coat of arms
- Location of Priozersky District in Leningrad Oblast
- Coordinates: 61°02′N 30°07′E
- Country: Russia
- Federal subject: Leningrad Oblast
- Established: 9 July 1940
- Administrative center: Priozersk

Area
  - Total: 3,579.5 km^{2} (1,382.1 sq mi)

Population (2010 Census)
  - Total: 43,260
  - Density: 12.09/km^{2} (31.30/sq mi)
  - Urban: 10.3%
  - Rural: 89.7%

Administrative structure
  - Administrative divisions: 12 settlement municipal formation
  - Inhabited localities: 1 cities/towns, 1 urban-type settlements, 101 rural localities

Municipal structure
  - Municipally incorporated as: Priozersky Municipal District
  - Municipal divisions: 2 urban settlements, 12 rural settlements
- Time zone: UTC+3 (MSK)
- OKTMO ID: 41639000
- Website: http://priozersk.lenobl.ru/

Priozersky District (Russian: Приозерский район) is an administrative and municipal district (raion), one of the seventeen in Leningrad Oblast, Russia. It is located in the northwest of the oblast and borders with Lakhdenpokhsky District of the Republic of Karelia in the north, Vsevolozhsky District in the south, and Vyborgsky District in the west. In the east, the district is bounded by Lake Ladoga. The area of the district is 3,597.5 square kilometers (1,389.0 sq mi). Its administrative center is the town of Priozersk. Population (excluding the administrative center): 43,260 (2010 census); 42,859 (2002 Census); 40,231 (1989 Soviet census).

== Geography ==
The area of the district is elongated from north to south along the shore of Lake Ladoga. It completely belongs to the catchment area of Lake Ladoga, with the biggest river being the Vuoksi. The landscapes are typical for Kartelian Isthmus, with the hilly and rocky terrain covered by coniferous forest, and with many lakes. The biggest lakes in the district are Lake Vuoksa, Lake Sukhodolskoye, and Lake Otradnoye. Konevets Island on Lake Ladoga also belongs to the district. Forests occupy 63% of the area of the district.

== History ==
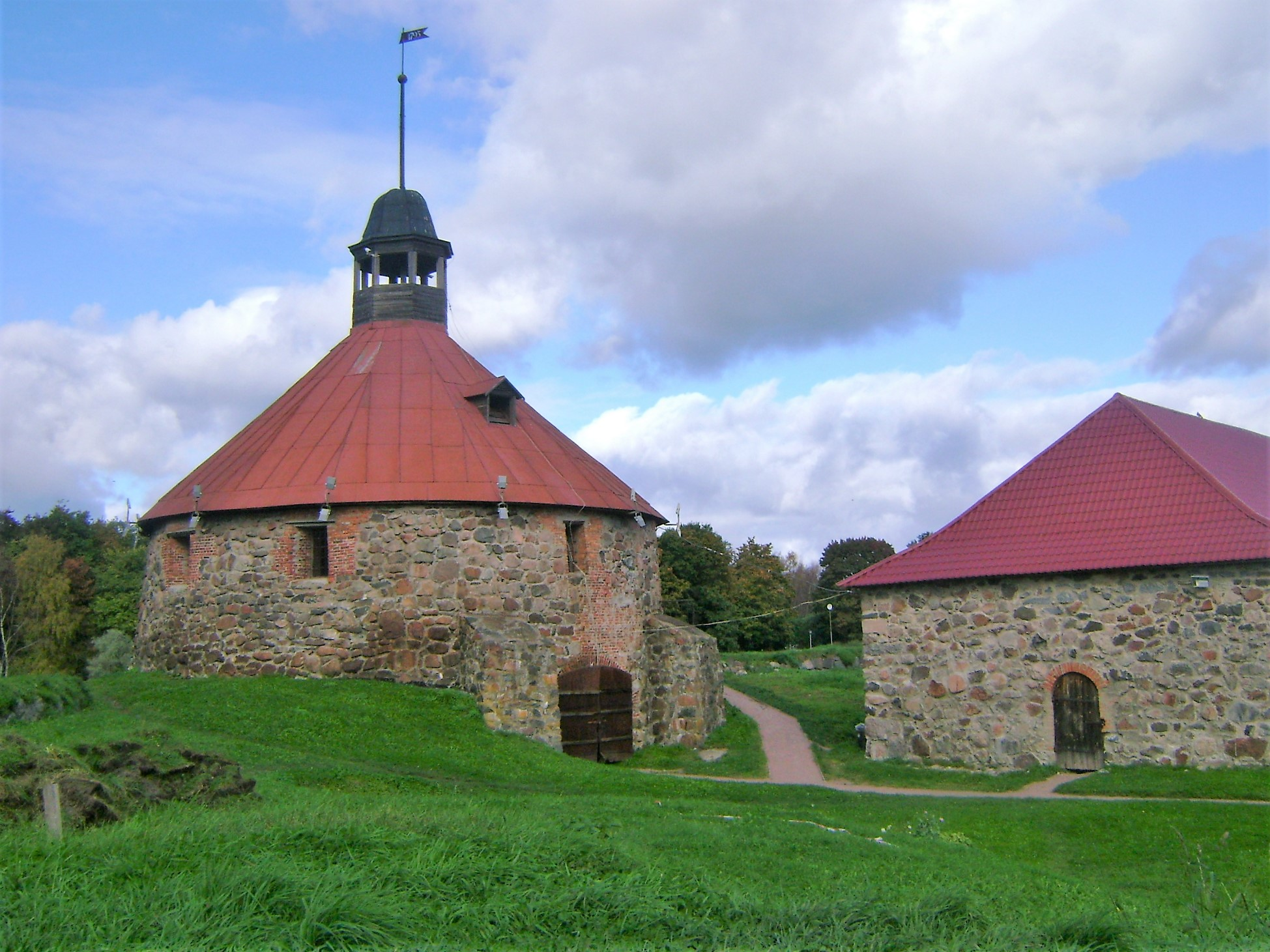
Korela Fortress

The territory of the modern district was originally settled by Karelians around the 1st century CE. It was a part of the Kievan Rus' from the 9th to 12th century. After that, it was a part the Novgorod Republic. Most Karelians were converted to the Russian Orthodox faith during Russian rule. Russians built the fortress of Korela, which was a nucleus of modern Priozersk. The territory passed hands many times during the 16th and 17th centuries between Russians and Swedish, until it was finally claimed by Russians in 1711 during the Great Northern War. During Swedish rule in the area, the town was known by its Swedish name Kexholm, which in Russian became Keksgolm. In the 18th century, it was a part of Saint Petersburg Governorate, and later of Vyborg Governorate, which in 1812 was included in the newly created Grand Duchy of Finland as its Viipuri Province. It became part of independent Finland, when the former Grand Duchy declared its independence in December 1917. During the Interwar Period, the location was known by its Finnish and Swedish names; Käkisalmi (Finnish) and Kexholm (Swedish).

The area was ceded from Finland to the Soviet Union as a result of the 1939-40 Winter War. It was retaken by Finland during the 1941-44 Continuation War, regained by Soviet troops in 1944, and formally ceded to the Soviet Union in 1947. Nearly all of Finnish residents evacuated the area, which was repopulated by Russians, Ukrainians, and Belarusians. Place names were changed in 1948 to remove remaining Finnish names in the district.

Keksgolmsky District with the administrative center in Keksgolm was established in March 1940 as a part of the Karelian Autonomous Soviet Socialist Republic (Karelian ASSR). On March 31, 1940, the Karelian ASSR was transformed into the Karelo-Finnish Soviet Socialist Republic. On November 24, 1944, Keksgolmsky District was transferred from Karelo-Finnish Soviet Socialist Republic to Leningrad Oblast. On October 1, 1948, the district was renamed Priozersky, and Keksgolm was renamed Priozersk. On February 1, 1963 the district was abolished and merged into Vyborgsky District; on January 12, 1965 it was re-established.

On May 16, 1940, Rautovsky District with the administrative center in the suburban settlement of Rautu was also established. It was a part of Leningrad Oblast. On October 1, 1948, the district was renamed Sosnovsky and on January 13, 1949, all localities whose names originated in Finnish were renamed using Russian names. In particular, Rautu was renamed Sosnovo. On December 9, 1960, Sosnovsky District was abolished and split between Roshchinsky and Priozersky Districts.

== Economy ==
=== Industry ===
Industry in the district is dominated by the treatment of granite, timber production, and food production.

=== Agriculture ===
The main specializations of agriculture in the district are meat (beef and pork) and milk production, as well as trout farming.

=== Transportation ===
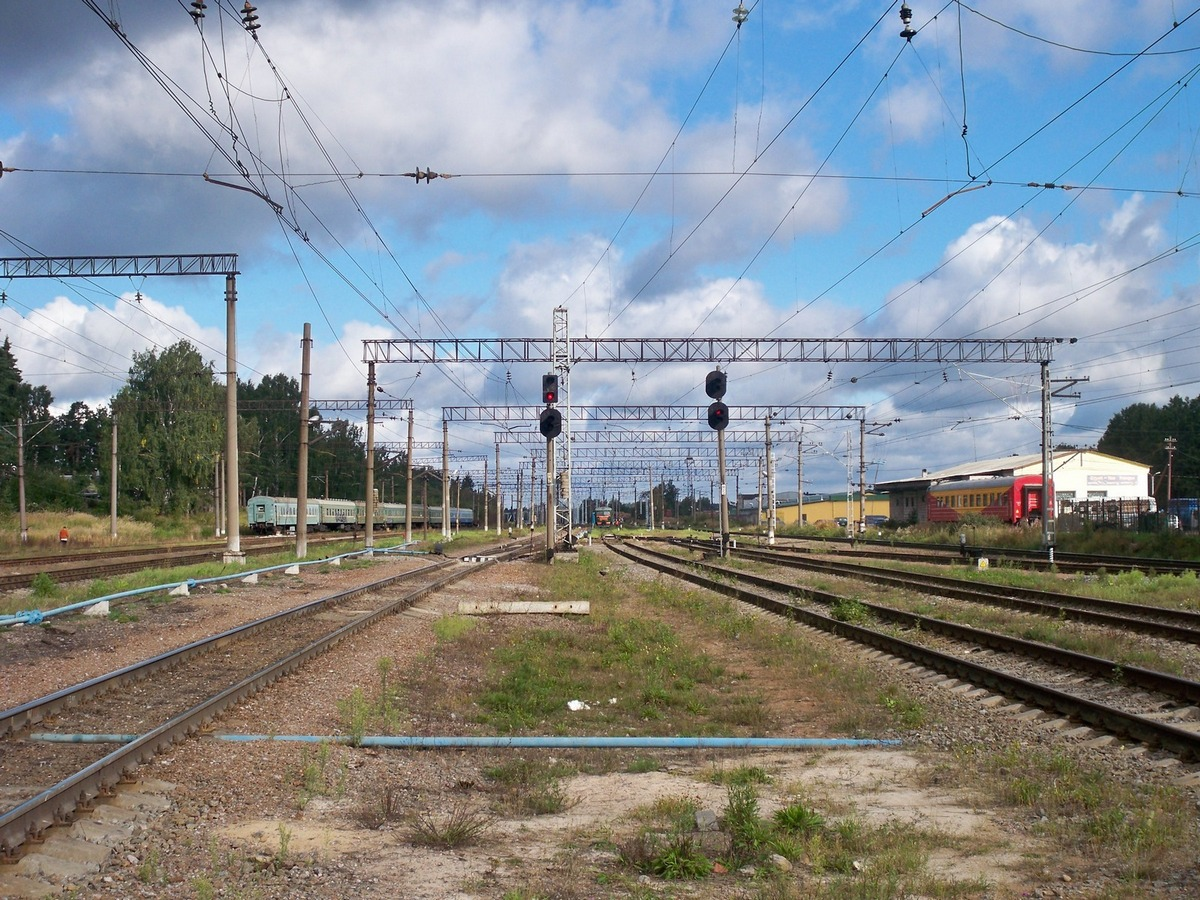
Sosnovo railway station.

The Saint Petersburg – Hiitola railroad crosses the district from south to north passing Sosnovo, Priozersk, and Kuznechnoye. There is passenger service from the Finland Station of Saint Petersburg. Another railroad, connecting Vyborg with Hiitola via Kamennogorsk, serves as a stretch of the border with Vyborgsky District.

The road network in the district is relatively well-connected and provides access to Vyborg, Sortavala, and Saint Petersburg. In particular, the A129 highway connects Saint Petersburg and Sortavala and runs through Priozersk.

== Culture and recreation ==
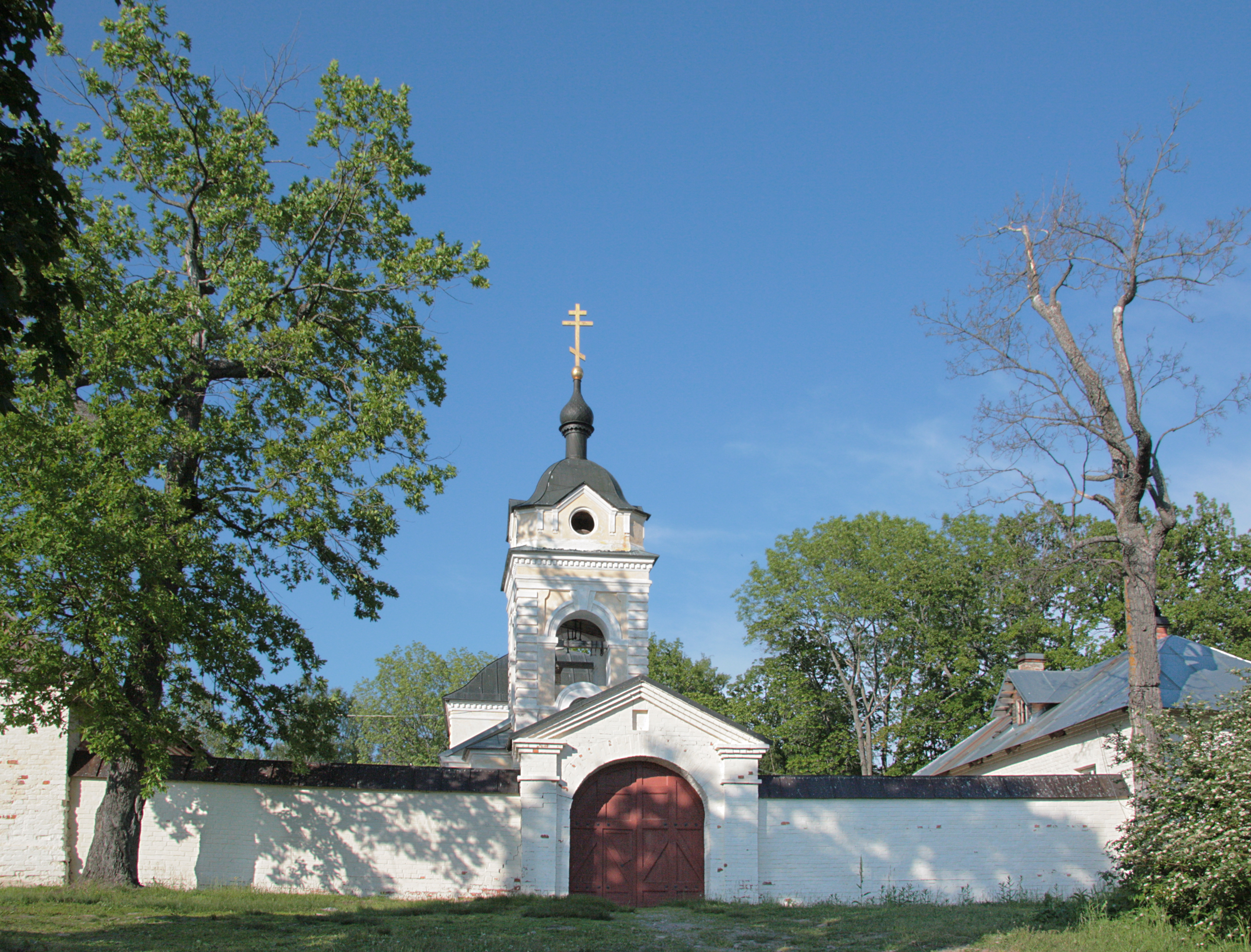
Kazan Skete of the Konevsky Monastery

Some remains of the pre-1917 Russian culture, including the Korela Fortress in Priozersk and the Konevsky Monastery at Konevets Island, survive. Much of the remnants of the Finnish presence was destroyed. The district is the most popular with tourists part of Karelian Isthmus.

The district contains 64 cultural heritage monuments of federal significance (33 of which are in Priozersk) and additionally 70 objects classified as cultural and historical heritage of local significance. The great majority of these monuments belong to the Korela fortress and the Konevets Island.
