= Matti Kekki =

Matti Kekki (11 March 1868, in Antrea – 11 March 1933, in Viipuri) was an agronomist, farmer, and Member of the Parliament in 1910–1911 and from 1919 to 1922.

Born to farmer Matti Kekki, and Anna Suni. He graduated in 1890.

Kekki resided in Viipuri, the eastern provincial electoral district. He was represented in 1910 for the Nuorsuomalainen Puolue and from 1919 to 1921, the Progress Party.

Kekki worked as a farmer in Viipuri for the rest of his life until he died on 11 March 1933, in which was his 65th birthday.
