= Saint Petersburg–Hiitola railway =

Railway line in Russia

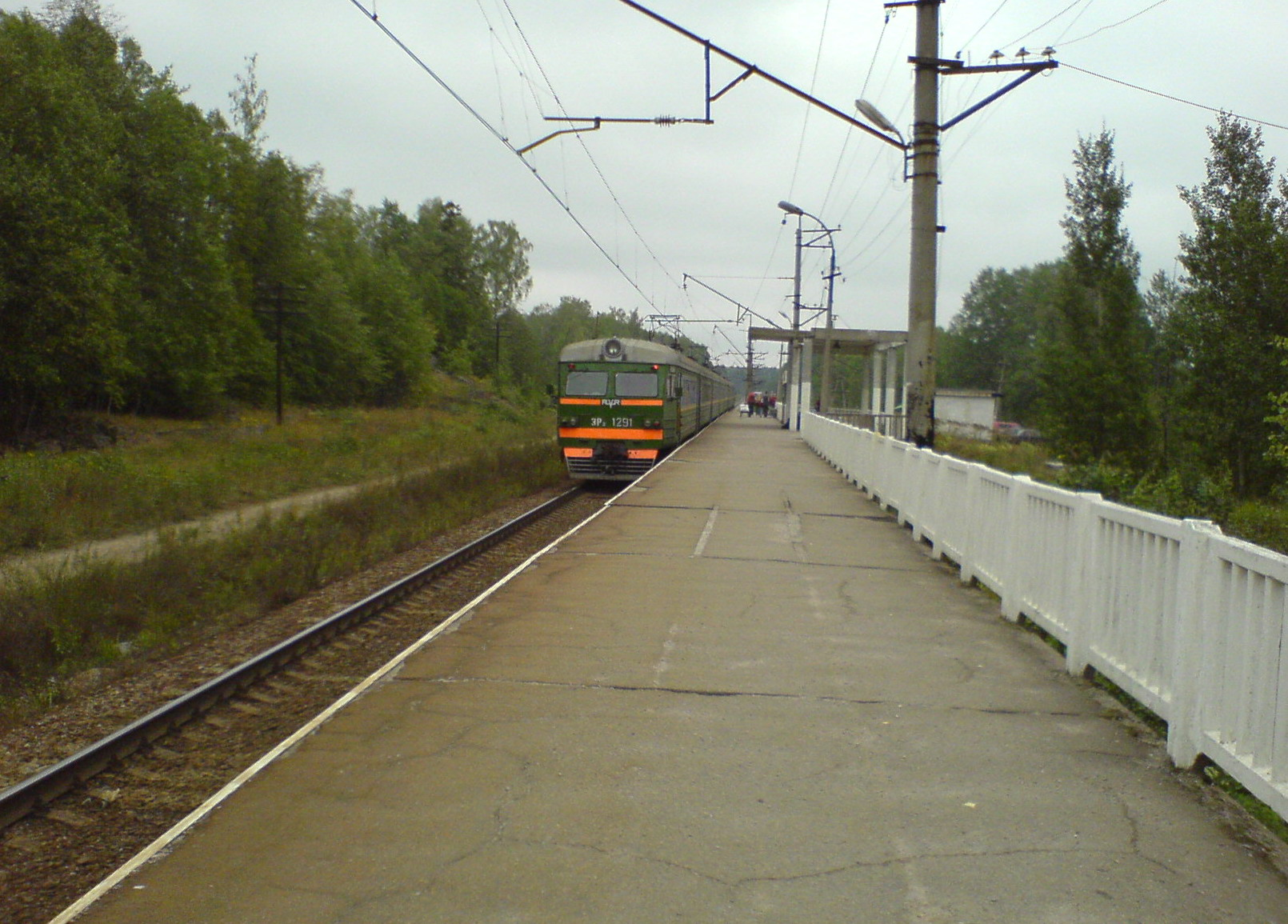
- Elektrichka at Sinyovo railway station

Overview
- Owner: Russian Railways
- Termini: Finlyandsky Rail Terminal; Khiytola
- Stations: 47

Service
- Type: Commuter rail Freight rail
- Operator(s): Russian Railways

History
- Opened: January 1917

Technical
- Line length: 178 km
- Number of tracks: 2
- Track gauge: 1,520 mm (4 ft 11 27/32 in) Russian gauge
- Electrification: 25 kV 50 Hz AC overhead line

The Saint Petersburg–Hiitola railway is a 170-kilometer (110 mi) long railway with 1,520 mm (4 ft 11 27/32 in) broad gauge located in St. Petersburg, Leningrad Oblast (Karelian Isthmus) and Republic of Karelia, which links Finlyandsky Rail Terminal to Khiytola (Finnish: Hiitola) through Devyatkino, Vaskelovo, Sosnovo, Priozersk and Kuznechnoye. Originally built by Finnish State Railways in the Grand Duchy of Finland, the railway was part of a trunk line from Vaasa by the Gulf of Botnia to St. Petersburg. In the 1940 Moscow Peace Treaty the territory was ceded by Finland to the Soviet Union. The railroad is now operated by the Russian Railways. The railroad is used by passenger trains between St. Petersburg and Sortavala. The track between Khiytola and Sortavala is a part of the Vyborg–Joensuu railroad completed in 1894.

As the Russian part of the Riihimäki–Saint Petersburg railway is planned to be renovated to handle high-speed international trains operated by Karelian Trains and to be used exclusively for passenger traffic, so the cargo traffic between Finland and Russia—mostly lumber, granite rubble and oil—is expected to be switched to the Saint Petersburg–Hiitola railroad. This would make the railway a part of the Northern East-West Freight Corridor.

== History ==
The railway connected Hiitola (Khiytola) on the Vyborg–Joensuu railway with Finland Station in St. Petersburg, bypassing the Riihimäki–Vyborg–Saint Petersburg trunk line of Finnish railways. Construction of the railway had been completed by January 1917, although some works continued until 1919. The line was constructed from Rautu (Sosnovo) to Hiitola, as single line railway which is used in both directions. The part of the railway south of Raasuli (Orekhovo) was on the Russian side of the Finnish-Russian border.

In 1918, after Finnish independence and during the Finnish Civil War, communications between Finland and Soviet Russia ceased. In spring 1918, troops under Georg Elfvengren blew up the track to prevent supplies reaching Red Guard units operating near Rautu. The railway was cut between Nuijala (67th km) and Lembolovo and 1.7 kilometres (1.1 mi) of track was removed on the Finnish side. The Leningrad – Lembolovo part became part of NKPS Soviet Railways 1919 - 1939. This section was operated by at first by Nikolai Railway and later, after name change, the October Railway.

In 1940, after the Winter War and again in 1944 after the Continuation War the Karelian Isthmus with the railway was ceded to the Soviet Union in the Moscow Peace Treaty, Moscow Armistice and Paris Peace Treaty.

In 1939, as the war had begun, the population along the railway was evacuated, mostly to Pieksämäki. In 1941 some of them returned. In June 1944 during the final stages of the Continuation War, a train of Karelian evacuees was bombed by the Soviet Air Force in Petäjärvi.

The second parallel track between Sosnovo and Losevo, which is expected to be linked to Kamennogorsk and Vyborg, has been under construction since 2008 to handle the increasing freight traffic bypassing the connection between Saint Petersburg and Vyborg.

== Railway stations ==
Finnish State Railways in 1918, at the time of the Finnish Civil War

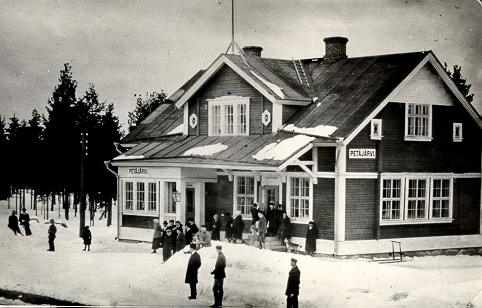
The Petäjärvi railway station in the 1930s

Map of Saint_Petersburg–Hiitola railway

The construction year and original Finnish/Karelian name are given in brackets. Stops of the diesel-engined train are bolded.

- **Saint Petersburg – Finlyandsky Rail Terminal** (1870) 0 kilometres (0 mi)
- Kushelevka (1912) as a freight terminal from so called Connection Line. 5 kilometres (3.1 mi)
- Piskaryovka (Piskarjevka, 1914) 9 kilometres (5.6 mi)
- Ruchyi (Rutshi, 1917) 12 kilometres (7.5 mi)
- Murino (Muurola)
- Devyatkino (Vanha Miina, 1917) 17 kilometres (11 mi)
- Lavriki (Suur Laurikkala. 1932)
- Kapitolovo (Kopittara, 1957) 23 kilometres (14 mi)
- Kuzmolovo (Kuismala, 1929)
- Toksovo (Toksava / Toksova, 1917) 29 kilometres (18 mi)
- Kavgolovo (Kaukola, 1929)
- Oselki (Osselki / Osselkä, 1929)
- Peri (1924) 42 kilometres (26 mi)
- 39th km (Lieskola)
- Gruzino (Rokansaari, 1917). Branch line to Zavodskoy (Kuivaisi). 50 kilometres (31 mi)
- 47th km (Varsala)
- Vaskelovo (Juskela, 1917) 57 kilometres (35 mi)
- 54th km Lembolovo (Lempäälä) (Orimäki, 1916) (9 kilometres (5.6 mi) after the station, railway reached to former Finnish/Russian border)
- Orekhovo / Orehovo (Raasuli, 1916) 65 kilometres (40 mi)
- 67th km (Nuijala)
- 69th km (Kelliö)
- **Sosnovo** (1916, Rautu) ex VR station 79 kilometres (49 mi)
- 78th km (Mäkrä, now Razdolye)
- **Petyayarvi** (1916, Petäjärvi) 91 kilometres (57 mi)
- Losevo (1916, Kiviniemi)
- **Gromovo** (1916, Sakkola) 107 kilometres (66 mi)
- Sukhodolye (1916, Haitermaa)
- Otradnoye (1916, Pyhäjärvi) 120 kilometres (75 mi)
- **Myullyupelto** (1916, Myllypelto) 130 kilometres (81 mi)
- Sinyovo (1916, Näpinlahti)
- **Priozersk** (1916, Käkisalmi) 145 kilometres (90 mi)
- 148th km (Granitnoye) (1916, Kapisalmi)
- 152nd km (Bogatyri) (1916, Paukkunen)
- **Kuznechnoye** (1916, Kaarlahti) 160 kilometres (99 mi)
- 159th km
- **168th km**, Kulikovo (1892, Kirkko Hiitola)
- **Khiytola** (1892, Hiitola) 178 kilometres (111 mi)

== Electrification ==
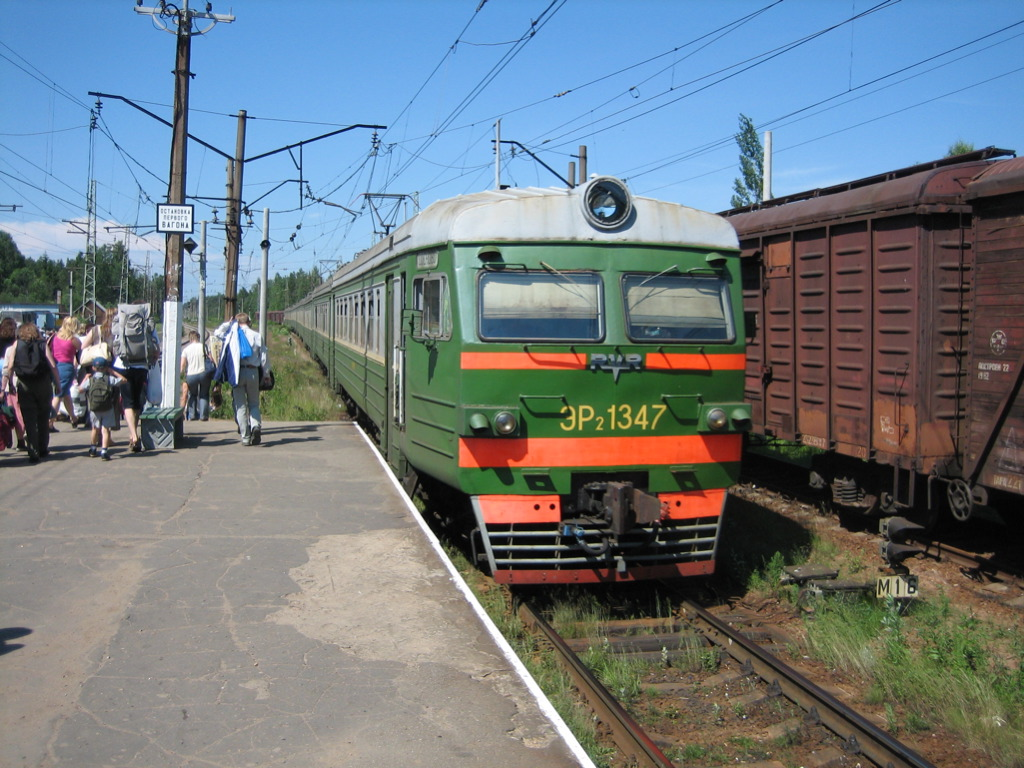
Elektrichka at Vaskelovo

1951: Finlyandskiy Rail Terminal – Piskaryovka
1958: Piskaryovka – Peri
1959: Peri – Vaskelovo
1959: Vaskelovo – Sosnovo
1975: Sosnovo – Priozersk
1976: Priozersk – Kuznechnoye

== Finnish statistics for Hiitola–Raasuli–Border line ==
Public Timetable 1938:

- Hiitola 0 kilometres (0 mi) station 55.62 metres (182.5 ft) above sea level
- Vaavoja 5 kilometres (3.1 mi) stopping place (5.4 kilometres (3.4 mi))
- Veijala 8 kilometres (5.0 mi) platform switch (8.3 kilometres (5.2 mi))
- Kopsala 11 kilometres (6.8 mi) stopping place in 1944 timetable (11.1 kilometres (6.9 mi))
- Sirsjärvi 14 kilometres (8.7 mi) stopping place (14.4 kilometres (8.9 mi))
- Kaarlahti 18 kilometres (11 mi) station (18.2 kilometres (11.3 mi)) 11.89 metres (39.0 ft) above sea level
- Suokkala 21 kilometres (13 mi) stopping place (21.6 kilometres (13.4 mi))
- Kapeasalmi 26 kilometres (16 mi) platform switch (26.1 kilometres (16.2 mi)) 14.29 metres (46.9 ft) above sea level
- Käkisalmi 33 kilometres (21 mi) station (33.6 kilometres (20.9 mi)) 10.02 metres (32.9 ft) above sea level
- Näpinlahti 43 kilometres (27 mi) platform switch (43.6 kilometres (27.1 mi)) 10.02 metres (32.9 ft) above sea level
- Myllypelto 48 kilometres (30 mi) station (48.7 kilometres (30.3 mi)) 22.67 metres (74.4 ft) above sea level
- Rajasuo 52 kilometres (32 mi) stopping place in 1944 timetable (51.9 kilometres (32.2 mi))
- Pyhäjärvi 58 kilometres (36 mi) station (58.7 kilometres (36.5 mi)) 23.84 metres (78.2 ft) above sea level
- Noitermaa 65 kilometres (40 mi) platform switch (65.1 kilometres (40.5 mi)) 32.61 metres (107.0 ft) above sea level
- Sakkola 71 kilometres (44 mi) station (71.6 kilometres (44.5 mi)) 46 metres (151 ft) above sea level
- Viiksanlahti 76 kilometres (47 mi) stopping place
- Kiviniemi 79 kilometres (49 mi) station (79.5 kilometres (49.4 mi)) 16.05 metres (52.7 ft) above sea level
- Suvantola 81 kilometres (50 mi) stopping place
- Petäjärvi 88 kilometres (55 mi) station (88 kilometres (55 mi)) 52.11 metres (171.0 ft) above sea level
- Mäkrä 95 kilometres (59 mi) stopping place
- Rautu 99 kilometres (62 mi) station (99.8 kilometres (62.0 mi)) 64.44 metres (211.4 ft) above sea level
- Raasuli border 8,941.6 metres (29,336 ft) from Rautu. Highest point of the line, 97.61 metres (320.2 ft) above sea level.

== Branches ==
The Finlyandsky Rail Terminal also serves the railroads heading toward Zelenogorsk and Vyborg, among others. Further, after Piskaryovka, the road branches into three ways, two others heading south and east. After Murino there is a link to Pargolovo (Vyborg direction), along which a section of the Saint Petersburg Ring Road has been constructed.

By 1930 in Finland a railroad linking Viipuri (Vyborg), Heinjoki (Veshchevo), Ristseppälä (Zhitkovo) and Valkjärvi (Michurinskoye) had been built, which was expected to be continued to Rautu (Sosnovo). The Russians started to build the missing section between Rautu and Valkjärvi. The Finns considered also to build this missing link but they found the difference in turns of highest maximum up grade too big (Valkjärvi station was 111.89 metres (367.1 ft) above sea level). The up grade from River Saija would have been more than 15 pro mille. That was too much for this proposed line and the project was cancelled. In August 1941, 6 kilometres (3.7 mi) of the track bed had been completed by the Russians. The remainder of this section was never completed. However, in the 1950s Soviet authorities demolished the track between Zhitkovo and Michurinskoye, but the track bed remains, and the rails between Veshchevo and Zhitkovo were also dismantled in 2001. However, the roadbed from Veshchevo to Sosnovo has remained until now.

At Käkisalmi was a short industrial 1,524 mm (5 ft) broad gauge railway to the German-owned Waldhof Cellulose Factory. This line was connected with VR built short Käkisalmi Harbour Line.

As of 2007, projects are being discussed to construct a cargo railway along the northern shore of the Vuoksi River from Losevo to Kamennogorsk to ship crude oil to the sea port of Primorsk bypassing the Saint Petersburg – Vyborg line. An alternative is reconstruction of the Sosnovo – Michurinskoye – Zhitkovo – Vyborg railway.

The old Karelian railroad links Vyborg and Kamennogorsk (in turn linked by railway to Imatra, Finland) to Hiitola.

Besides, a number of short military and industrial railways a few km long branch off from this line, e.g. a track between Orekhovo and Lembolovo westwards to Steklyannyi (Riskanmäki), between Gruzino and 47th km eastwards, between Otradnoye and Myllypelto westwards. At Priozersk eastwards to the Priozersk Pulp and Paper Mill, (former Waldhof Factory), as well as at Kuznechnoye (Kaarlahti) to the shore of Lake Ladoga) harbour.

== Trains ==
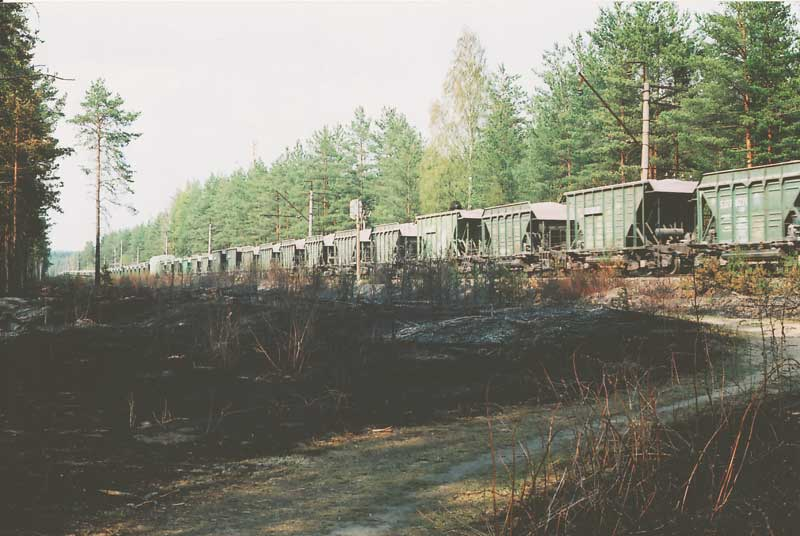
Cargo train

The railway is used to ship petroleum to the ports of the Gulf of Finland through Hiitola, lumber and iron ore pellets from Karelia, as well as granite rubble from Kuznechnoye. Besides, it is a popular passenger line.

=== Passenger trains ===
==== Electric ====
(elektrichkas)

Saint Petersburg – Vaskelovo (about 1 h 25 min with all stops as of 2007)
Saint Petersburg – Sosnovo (about 2 h with all stops as of 2007)
Saint Petersburg – Priozersk (about 2 h 50 min with all stops as of 2007)
Saint Petersburg – Kuzhechnoye (about 3 h 25 min with all stops as of 2007)
Devyatkino – Vaskelovo (about 50 min with all stops as of 2007)
Devyatkino – Sosnovo (about 1 h 20 min with all stops as of 2007)
Kuznechnoye – Sortavala (about 25 min from Kuznechnoye to Hiitola with all stops as of 2007)

==== Diesel-engined ====
Saint Petersburg (Ladozhsky Rail Terminal) – Hiitola – Sortavala – Kostomuksha (about 3 h 35 m from Saint Petersburg to Hiitola)

== Accidents ==
In 1983 in Sosnovo there was a cargo train crash resulting in a large oil spill.

== See also ==
- Vyborg-Joensuu railway
