= Dave Komonen =

Long-distance runner

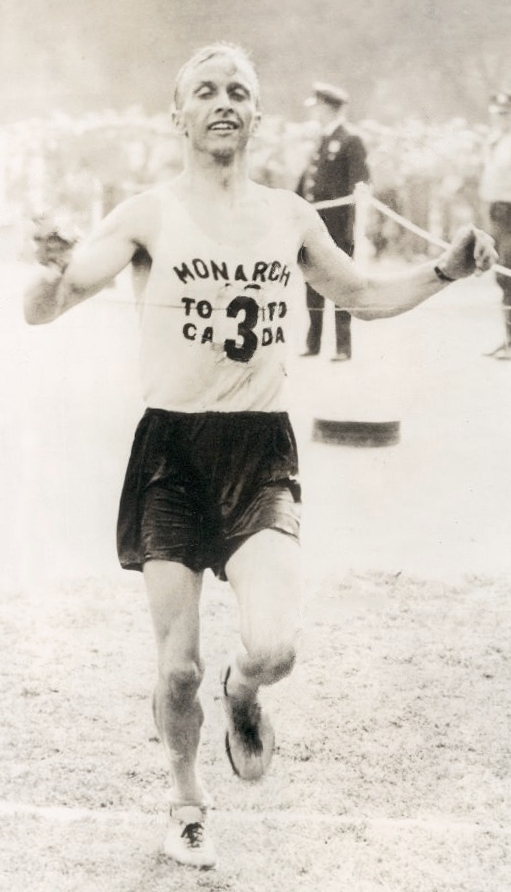
- Komonen in 1933

Personal information
- Full name: Taavi Komonen
- Nationality: Finnish
- Born: December 16, 1898 Käkisalmi, Finland
- Died: April 19, 1978 (aged 79) Helsinki, Finland

Sport
- Sport: Athletics
- Event: Marathon

Achievements and titles
- Personal best: 2:32:53 (1934)
Medal record
Silver medal – second place	1933 Boston Marathon	2:36:04
Gold medal – first place	1934 Boston Marathon	2:32:53

Taavi "Dave" Komonen (December 16, 1898 – April 19, 1978) was a Finnish-Canadian athlete, who mainly competed in marathon running. He won the Boston Marathon in 1934, after placing second the previous year.

== Career ==
Taavi Komonen was born in Käkisalmi, Karelia, which then belonged to Finland but was invaded by the Soviet Union during World War II. He worked as a farmer and carpenter in Finland before moving to Toronto, Ontario, Canada in 1929. In Canada his first name was anglicized to Dave. In Toronto he looked for work in the construction industry, but because of the Great Depression and his lack of English he did not find a steady job and was unemployed for periods of time.

He competed in the Boston Marathon for the first time in 1931 and finished seventh in the race. The same year he won the Canadian National Marathon Championship. In 1932 he returned to Finland to compete in the Olympic trials in Vyborg, but did not finish the race and consequently was not selected for the Finnish Olympic Team.

Komonen returned to Toronto, and in 1933 placed second in the Boston Marathon; the winner, Les Pawson, defeated Komonen easily, 2:31:01 to 2:36:04. After the race Komonen sold his running shoes for four dollars to pay for a ticket back to Toronto. The same year Komonen won his second Canadian National Marathon Championship. He also competed in the United States National Marathon Championship and won that race in 2:53:43, although Mel Porter, who ran 2:53:46, was recognized as the National Champion. On account of these three races Komonen was awarded the Lionel Conacher Award as Canada's male athlete of the year.

Despite his success Komonen was struggling with financial problems. He decided to move to Sudbury, Ontario, where there was a major Finnish community. In Sudbury he was employed as a carpenter at the Frood Mine. He also received financial aid making possible his trip to Boston in 1934. This time Komonen was overwhelmingly successful. His winning time of 2:32:53 was almost four minutes faster than that of runner-up Johnny Kelley. Early leader Willie Steiner was third in 2:40:29. On May 5, 1934, five years to the day from Komonen's arrival in Canada, he filed naturalization papers, aiming to compete in the 1934 British Empire Games in London. However, Canadian law required a three month waiting period for citizenship, meaning that Komonen would miss by three weeks the marathon trial scheduled for July. He was initially allowed to compete in the trial on the understanding that his citizenship papers would be finalized before the games. However, public pressure forced Komonen to drop out of the trial and he failed to qualify for the games. In October 1934 Komonen won his third Canadian National Marathon Championship.

After 1934 Komonen still competed but his best years were past. He lived in Sudbury until 1951 when he returned to Finland. He died on April 19, 1978, exactly 44 years after his victory in Boston.
