= Kuznechnoye =

Kuznechnoye Кузнечное
- Urban-type settlement
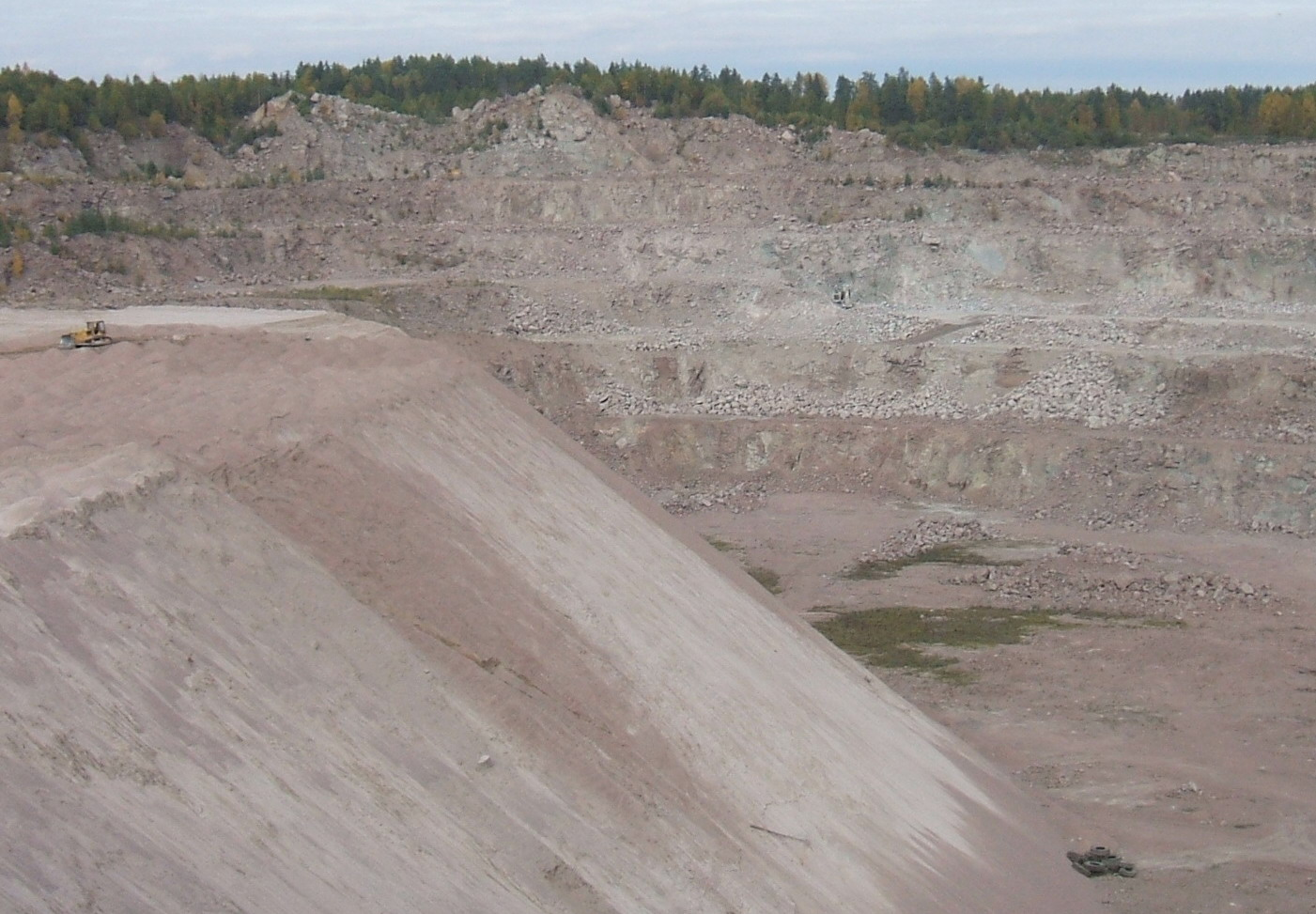
- Kuznechnoye granite quarry
- Interactive map of Kuznechnoye
- Location of Kuznechnoye Kuznechnoye (Leningrad Oblast)
- Coordinates: 61°07′N 29°52′E
- Country: Russia
- Federal subject: Leningrad Oblast
- Administrative district: Priozersky District
- Urban-type settlement status since: 1961

Population (2010 Census)
  - Total: 4,458
  - Estimate (2024): 3,865 (−13.3%)

Municipal status
  - Municipal district: Priozersky Municipal District
  - Urban settlement: Kuznechninskoye Urban Settlement
  - Capital of: Kuznechninskoye Urban Settlement
- Time zone: UTC+3 (MSK)
- Postal code: 188751
- OKTMO ID: 41639154051

Kuznechnoye (Russian: Кузне́чное; Finnish: Kaarlahti) is an urban locality (an urban-type settlement) in the northern part of Priozersky District of Leningrad Oblast, located on the Karelian Isthmus. Population: 4,458 (2010 census); 4,738 (2002 census); 5,017 (1989 Soviet census).

== History ==
The village of Kaarlahti was known since at least the 16th century and belonged interchangeably to Russia and Sweden. Since the middle of the 18th century, it was a part of Vyborg Governorate, which, in turn, since 1812 was a part of the Grand Duchy of Finland as the Viipuri Province. In 1916, the railway station was opened. In 1918, together with the rest of the Viipuri Province, Kaarlahti became a part of independent Finland. After the Winter War, it was reclaimed by the Soviet Union. Kaarlahti became a part of Keksgolmsky District with the administrative center in Keksgolm which was a part of the Karelian Autonomous Soviet Socialist Republic (Karelian ASSR). On March 31, 1940, the Karelian ASSR was transformed into the Karelo-Finnish Soviet Socialist Republic. During the Second World War, Kaarlahti was reclaimed by Finland and then again ceded to the Soviet Union. On November 24, 1944, Keksgolmsky District was transferred from Karelo-Finnish Soviet Socialist Republic to Leningrad Oblast.

In the end of 1944 a large granite quarry and processing plant (now belonging to JSC Granit-Kuznechnoye) was developed, and Kaarlahti started to grow steadily. In 1948, the station was renamed Granitnaya, and the settlement was renamed Kuznetsy, subsequently Kuznechnaya. On January 13, 1949 the settlement was renamed Kuznechnoye. In 1961, it was granted urban-type settlement status.

== Economy ==
=== Granite Excavation ===
The economy of the settlement is based on granite production. There are several quarries surrounding Kuznechnoye. The granite excavated from Kuznechnoye, during the Soviet era, has been used to build the St. Petersburg Metro Station and to pave many central streets of the city.

=== Transportation ===
Kuznechnoye is also an important station of the Saint Petersburg-Khiytola railroad, being the final destination of many passenger trains coming from Finlyandsky Rail Terminal of St. Petersburg (about 3 h 25 min as of 2007) and from Sortavala (about 2 h 45 min as of 2007) and a stop of the St. Petersburg–Kostomuksha trains.

Kuznechnoye is connected by road with Melnikovo and also has access to the A129 highway, which connects Saint Petersburg and Sortavala.

=== Tourism ===
Kuznechnoye's rocky outskirts are a popular climbing area and tourist destination.
