= Priozersk =

Town in Leningrad Oblast, Russia

Priozersk Приозерск
- Town
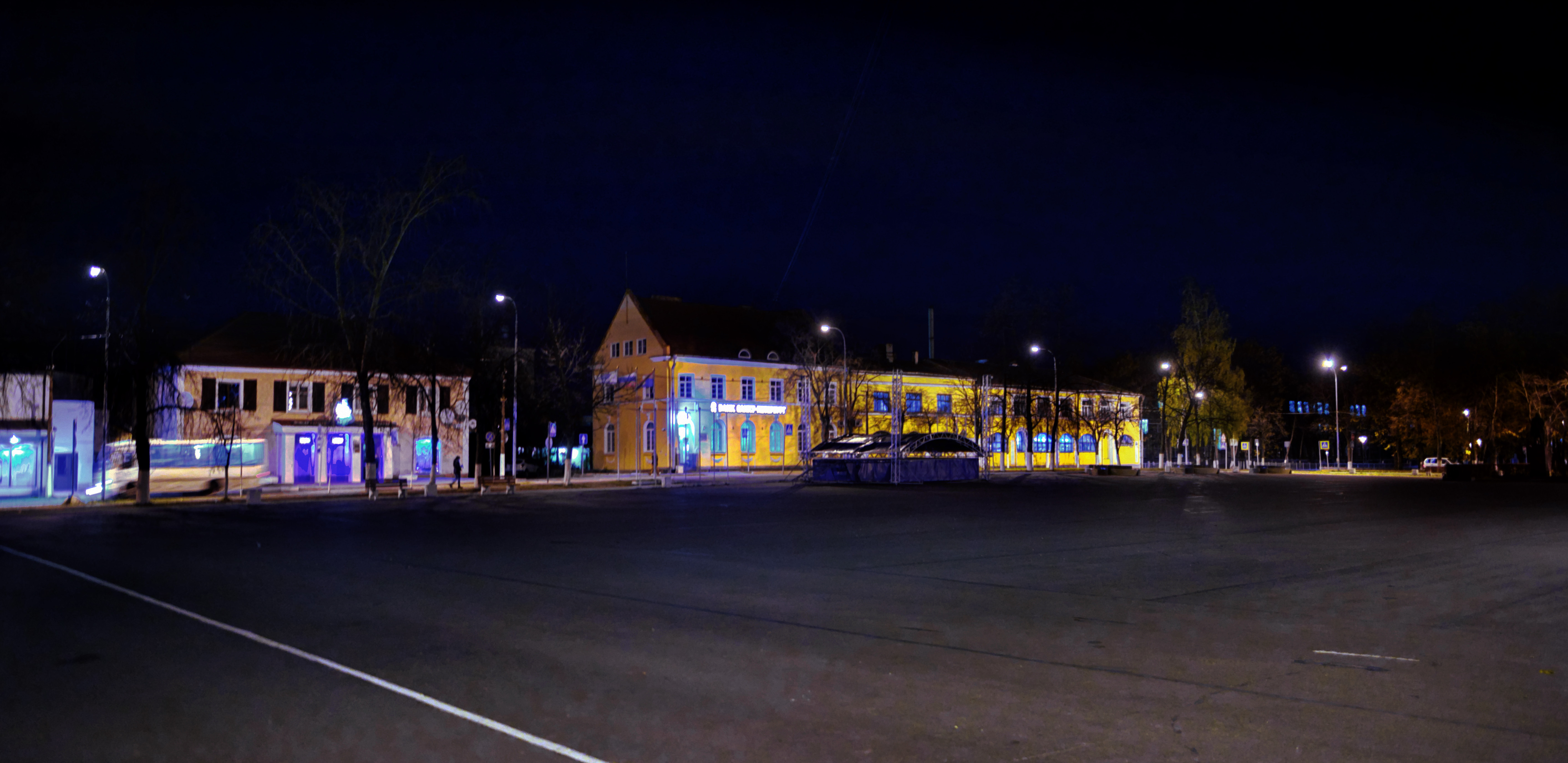
- Priozersk at night

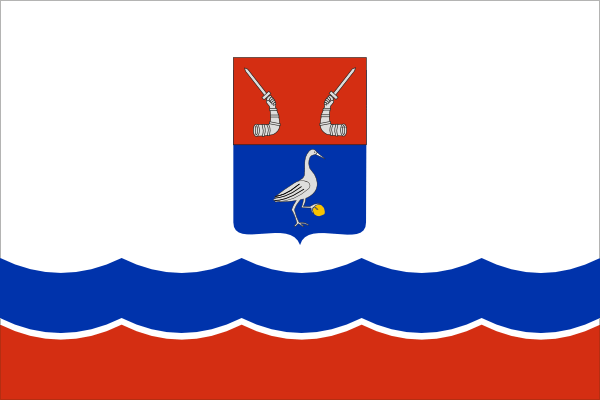
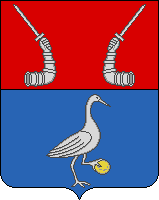
- Flag Coat of arms
- Interactive map of Priozersk
- Location of Priozersk Priozersk (European Russia) Priozersk (Europe)
- Coordinates: 61°03′N 30°08′E
- Country: Russia
- Federal subject: Leningrad Oblast
- Administrative district: Priozersky District
- Settlement municipal formationSelsoviet: Priozerskoye Settlement Municipal Formation
- Founded: 1294
- Elevation: 10 m (33 ft)

Population (2010 Census)
  - Total: 18,933
  - Estimate (2024): 18,235 (−3.7%)

Administrative status
  - Capital of: Priozersky District, Priozerskoye Settlement Municipal Formation

Municipal status
  - Municipal district: Priozersky Municipal District
  - Urban settlement: Priozerskoye Urban Settlement
  - Capital of: Priozersky Municipal District, Priozerskoye Urban Settlement
- Time zone: UTC+3 (MSK)
- Postal codes: 188760, 188761
- OKTMO ID: 41639101001

Priozersk (Russian: Приозе́рск; Finnish: Käkisalmi; Swedish: Kexholm) is a town and the administrative center of Priozersky District in Leningrad Oblast, Russia, located at the northwestern shore of Lake Ladoga, at the estuary of the northern armlet of the Vuoksi River on the Karelian Isthmus. It is served by a station of the same name on the St. Petersburg—Khiytola railway. Population: 18,777 (2021 census); 18,933 (2010 census); 20,506 (2002 census); 20,557 (1989 Soviet census).

== History ==
The main landmark of Priozersk, the Korela Fortress, has historically been the center for the Karelians of the Karelian Isthmus and from time to time the northwestern outpost of the realm of the Russians or the eastern outpost of the realm of the Swedes.

From the Middle Ages, Priozersk was known as Korela to Russians and Käkisalmi to Karelians and Finns. The earliest recorded mention of the place is from 1143. The town was a part of Vodskaya pyatina of the Novgorod Republic. Novgorod taxation documents from 1500 list 183 houses in Korela, suggesting an estimated population of 1,500–2,000. The Swedes captured Korela twice: in 1578 for seventeen years and in 1611 for a hundred years. In the Swedish Empire, the fortress was called Kexholm and the whole region became known as the County of Kexholm. Russia definitively secured the area during the Great Northern War; the town's Swedish name was retained, however, as Keksgolm (Кексгольм). Unfortunately, wars and devastating fires in 1300, 1580, 1634, and 1679 took their toll on the civilian population. Consequently, when the town gained its first court house in 1800, the population was only 400.

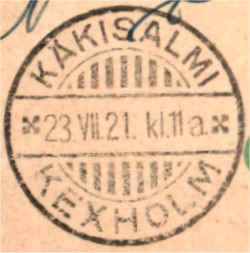
Käkisalmi postal cancellation 1921

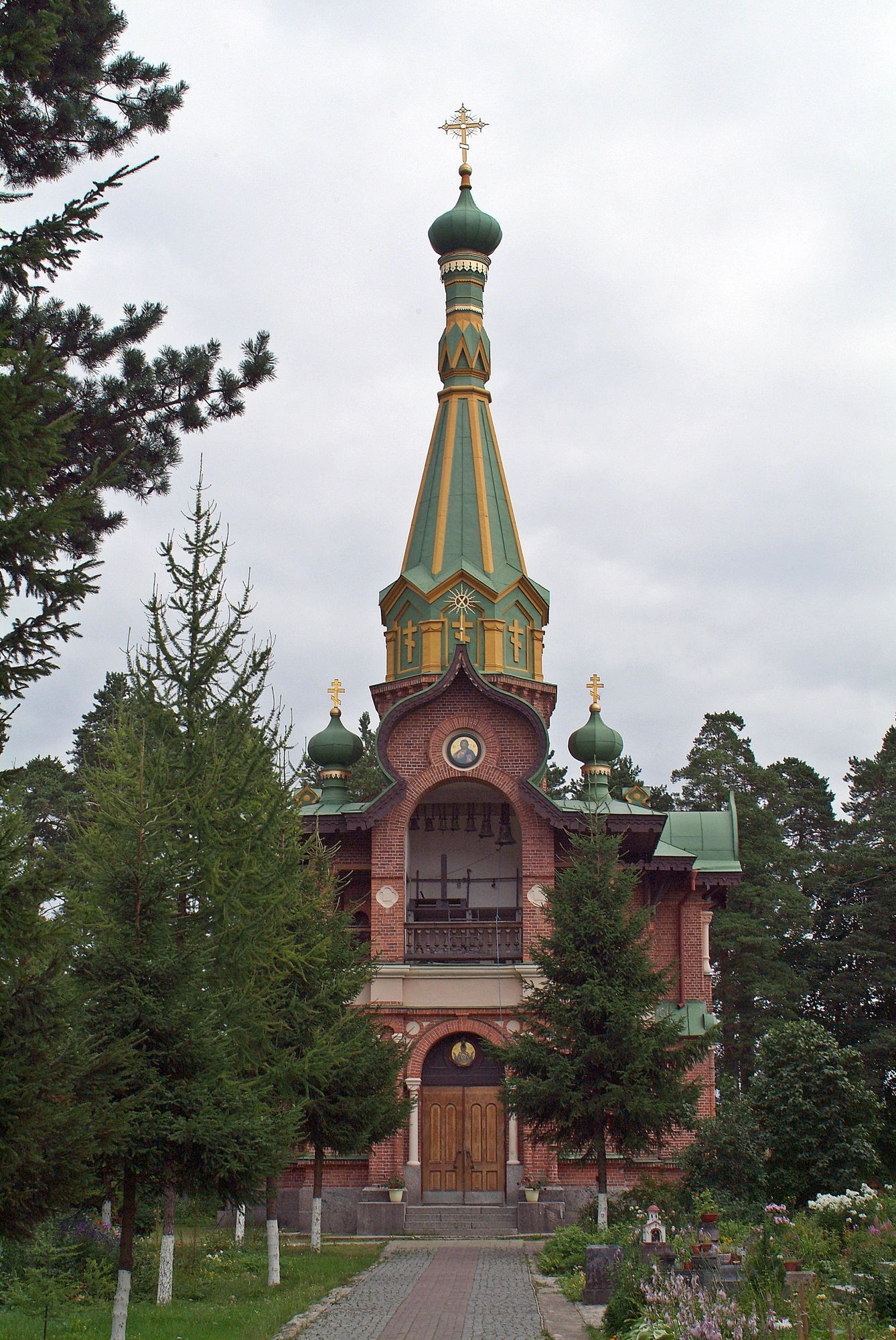
Orthodox Church of All Saints

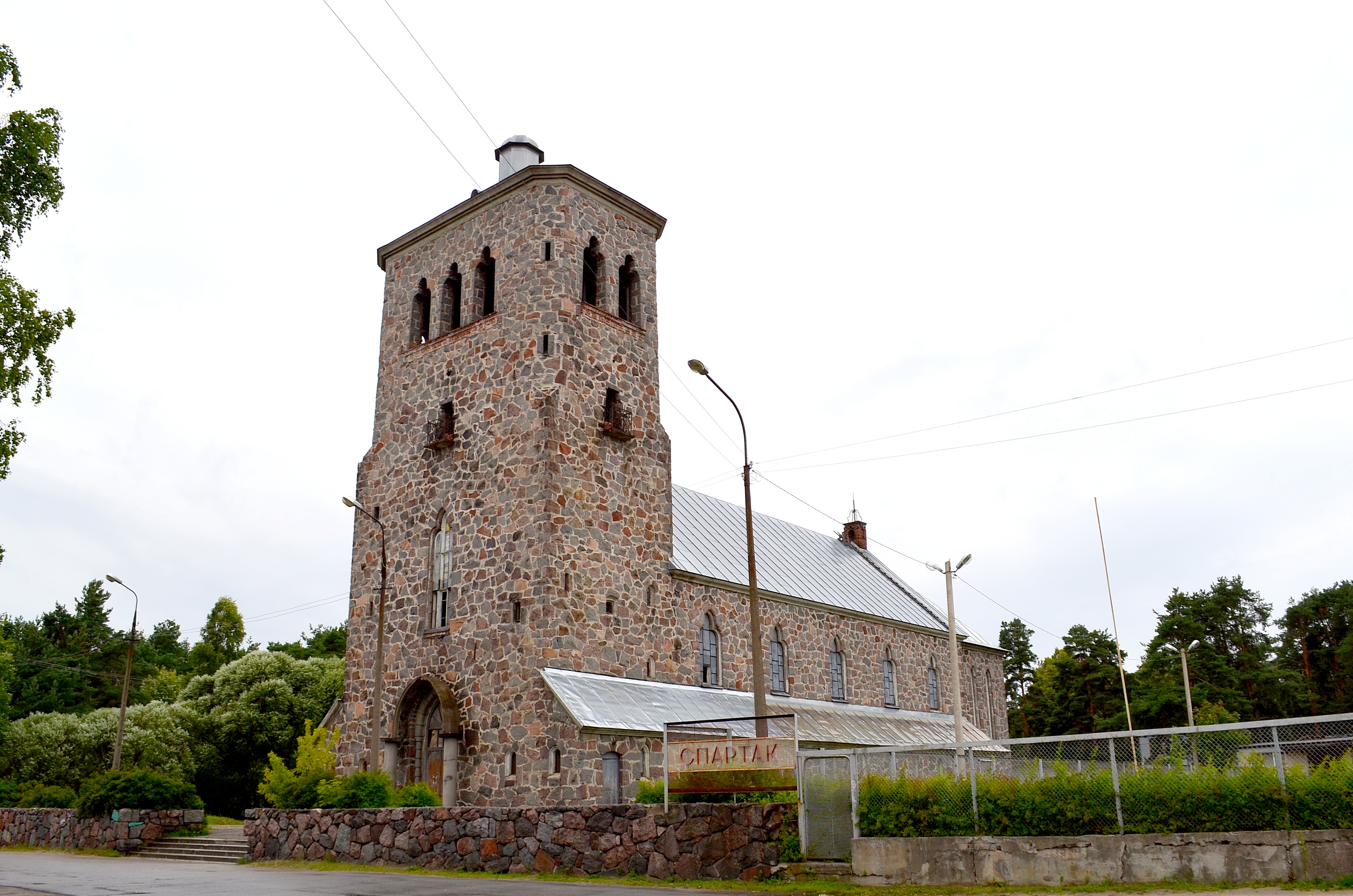
Finnish-era Lutheran Church

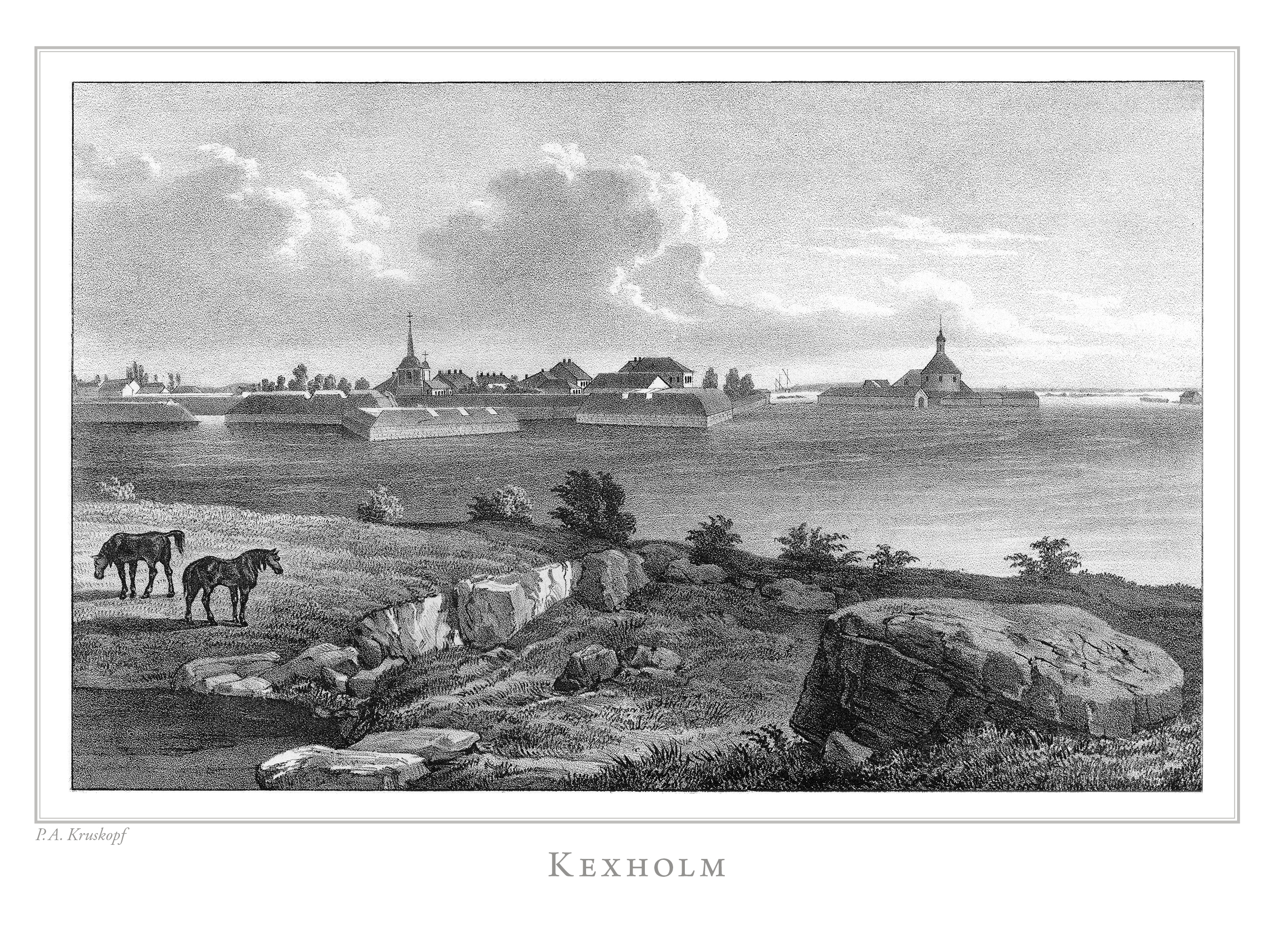
Kexholm illustrated in book series Finland framstäldt i teckningar by Zachris Topelius, published 1845–1852.

In 1812, as the Grand Duchy of Finland three years earlier had been formed within the Russian Empire, Tsar Alexander I incorporated Keksgolm with the rest of Old Finland (Vyborg Governorate) into an autonomous region. Keksgolm was the smallest city in the governorate. Since 1812, Vyborg Governorate was known as the Viipuri Province. In 1917, Finland became independent. The town's growth was boosted by the construction of the St. Petersburg–Hiitola railway in 1917 and by establishing two big saw mills and a big Ab Waldhof Oy's wood pulp mill in 1929. In 1939, Käkisalmi had a population of 5083. Around the town laid the rural municipality of Käkisalmi, with a population of 5,100. Minorities were Orthodox (946 persons), Swedish, Russian, or German. Total population was 11,129 in 1939.

The Winter War on November 30, 1939 began with the Soviet attack. Eventually, after hard fighting, Finland was forced to cede Käkisalmi and the eastern portion of Finnish Karelia to the Soviet Union by the terms of the 1940 Moscow Peace Treaty. During the Continuation War in 1941–1944, Finland gained back Keksgolm and other territories ceded to the Soviets in 1940. The population returned to rebuild the town, but were again evacuated at the close of World War II.

Keksgolmsky District with the administrative center in Keksgolm was established as a part of the Karelian Autonomous Soviet Socialist Republic (Karelian ASSR) in March 1940. On March 31, 1940, the Karelian ASSR was transformed into the Karelo-Finnish Soviet Socialist Republic. On November 24, 1944, Keksgolmsky District was transferred from the Karelo-Finnish Soviet Socialist Republic to Leningrad Oblast.

On October 1, 1948, Keksgolm was renamed Priozersk as a part of the campaign to rename localities in the areas annexed from Finland after the Second World War. Priozersk was settled with mainly Russians, Belarusian, and Ukrainian migrants, who have since comprised the majority of the local population.

== Administrative and municipal status ==
Within the framework of administrative divisions, Priozersk serves as the administrative center of Priozersky District. As an administrative division, it is, together with three rural localities, incorporated within Priozersky District as Priozerskoye Settlement Municipal Formation. As a municipal division, Priozerskoye Settlement Municipal Formation is incorporated within Priozersky Municipal District as Priozerskoye Urban Settlement.

== Economy ==
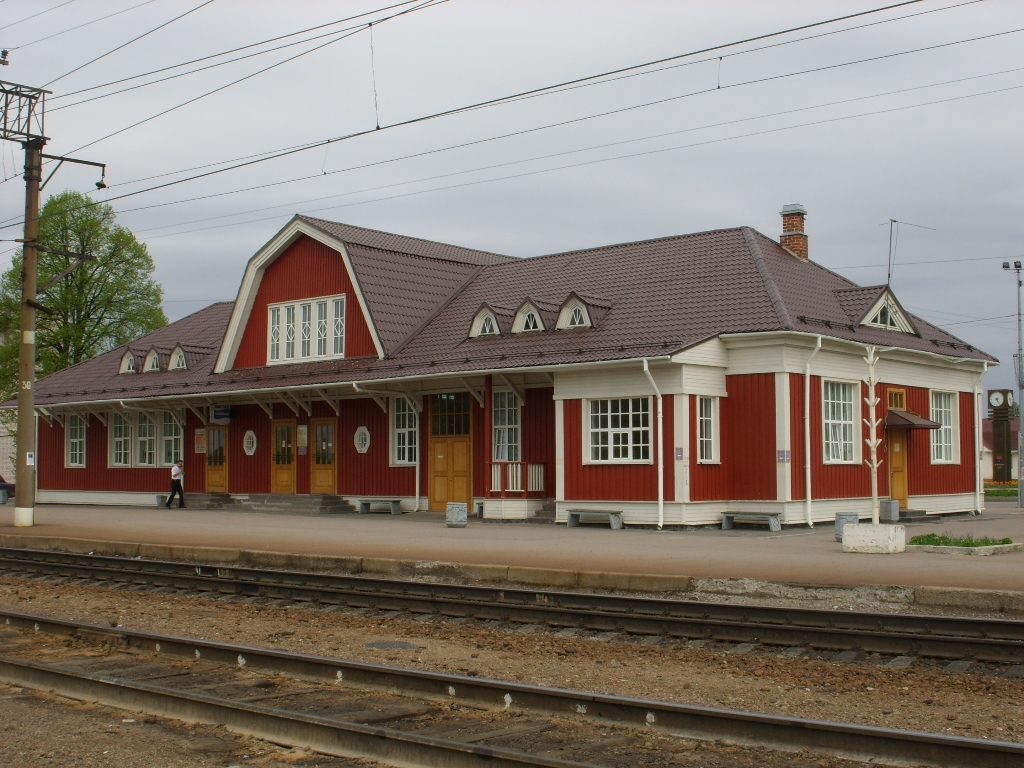
Priozersk railway station

=== Industry ===
The main industrial enterprise in Priozersk is the former paper mill transformed into a furniture production plant.

=== Transportation ===
Priozersk railway station is located on the Saint Petersburg – Hiitola railroad connecting Saint Petersburg and Sortavala via Hiitola. There is suburban (about 3 hours), express (about 2 hours) and long-distance service to Finland Station in Saint Petersburg.

The town is connected by roads with Saint Petersburg, Vyborg, and Sortavala.

== Culture and recreation ==
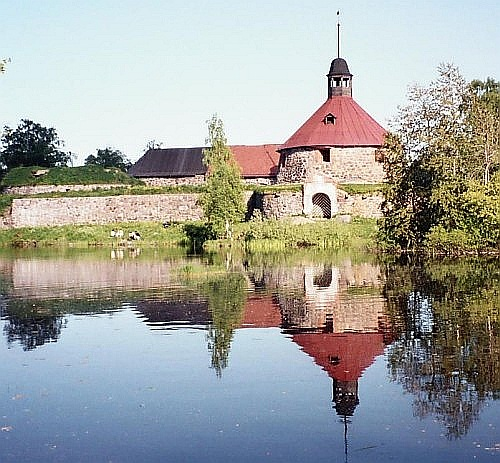
The Korela Fortress is the main landmark of Priozersk

Some remains of the pre-1917 Russian culture, mainly the Korela Fortress, survive. The ramparts and towers of the fortress are located on the bank of the Vuoksi, still visible when traveling to the town from St. Petersburg. There is a small museum in the fortress. Much of the remnants of the Finnish presence was destroyed. Priozersk contains thirty-three cultural heritage monuments of federal significance. The great majority of these monuments belong to the Korela fortress.

The town is popular destination with the residents of St. Petersburg, many of whom have dachas in the vicinity (such as the Ozero community).

== Notable people ==
- Dave Komonen
- Aku Korhonen
- Erkki Melartin
- Göran Stubb
- Urpo Ylönen
