= Vaskelovo =

Rural locality in Leningrad Oblast, Russia

Coordinates: 60°22′15.41″N 30°22′15.94″E

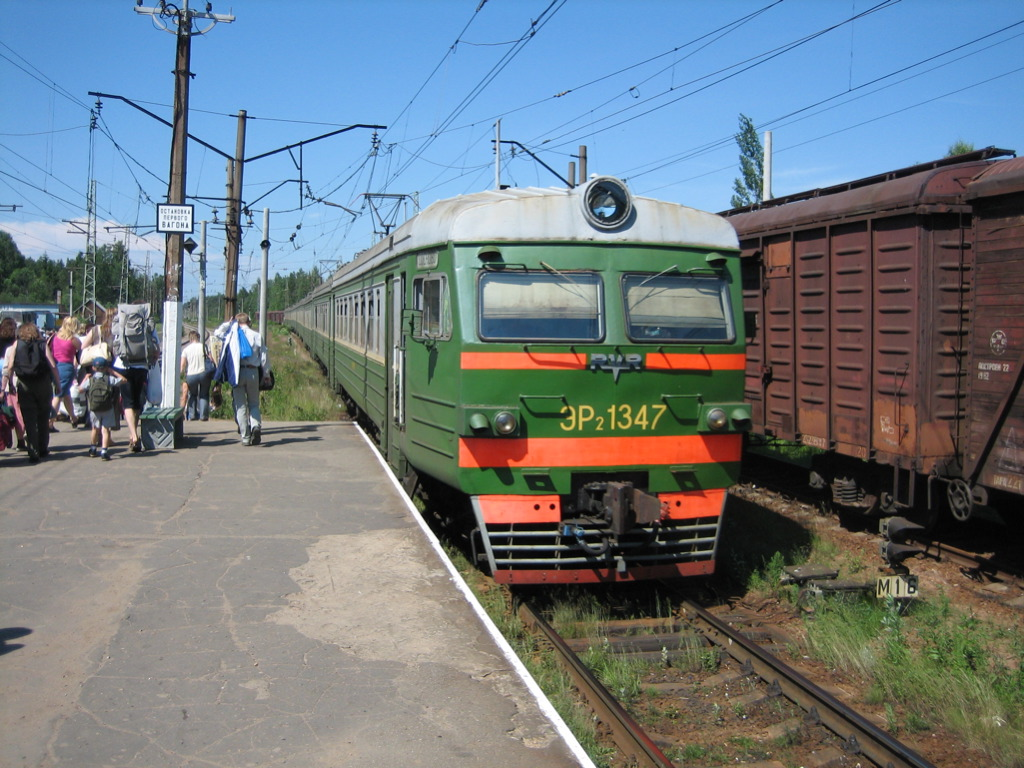
Elektrichka at Vaskelovo

Vaskelovo (Russian: Васкелово) is a rural locality on Karelian Isthmus, in Vsevolozhsky District of Leningrad Oblast, and an important station of the Saint Petersburg-Hiitola railroad, being the final destination of many suburban electric passenger trains from Finlyandsky Rail Terminal and Devyatkino.
