= Viipuri–Joensuu railroad =

Railway line in Finland

Finnish State Railways in 1918, at the time of the Finnish Civil War

The old Karelian railroad (Finnish: Karjalan rata) between Viipuri and Joensuu was a 1,524 mm (5 ft) broad gauge line that used to link Joensuu, Sortavala, Hiitola, Antrea and Viipuri. Originally built in 1892-1894 by Finnish State Railways in the Grand Duchy of Finland, in the 1940s most of the railway up to Niirala was ceded by Finland to the Soviet Union in the Moscow Peace Treaty, Moscow Armistice and Paris Peace Treaty as a result of the Winter War and Continuation War. Now the track is located in Leningrad Oblast (Karelian Isthmus), Republic of Karelia and North Karelia. The Sortavala–Joensuu link across the border was abolished after the Continuation War, but was since restored and is currently in use for cargo traffic.

== History ==
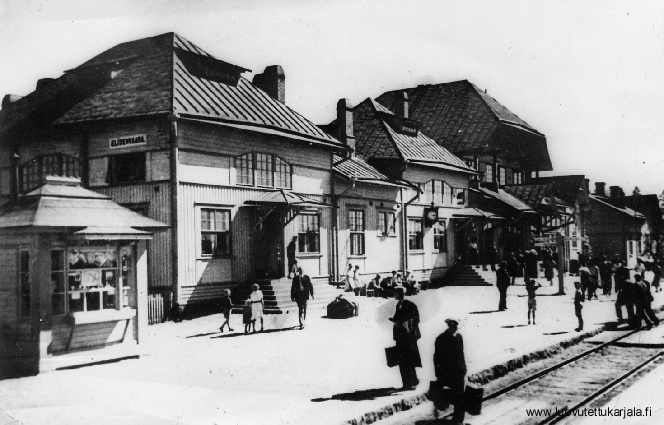
The old railway station in Elisenvaara, constructed around 1893, was destroyed during the Winter War

The decision to build a 311-kilometre (193 mi) railway from Viipuri to Joensuu was made by the Diet of Finland in 1888. Work on the railroad started in 1890, immediately after the Savonia railroad was finished.

The track from Viipuri via Antrea to Vuoksenniska (79 km (49 mi)) was completed in November 1892, Antrea to Sortavala (139 km (86 mi)) in November 1893, and Sortavala to Joensuu (132 km (82 mi)) in October 1894. Six thousand men worked on the railroad at the height of construction in September 1892.

A direct link between Hiitola and Finland Station in Petrograd, Russia, was opened in 1917, bypassing the Riihimäki-Petrograd railroad (see Saint Petersburg-Hiitola railroad).

The bombing of the Elisenvaara station of the Karelian railroad on 20 June 1944, during the final stages of the Continuation War, was the most fatal bombing in Finnish history; over one hundred civilians were killed when bombs hit a train of Karelian evacuees.

After the Winter War and Continuation War Karelian Isthmus and Ladoga Karelia with Viipuri, Hiitola, Elisenvaara and Sortavala were ceded to the Soviet Union, and most stations of the line got to the Soviet side of the new border. In the Moscow Peace Treaty on March 12, 1940, Finland lost the section Viipuri–Antrea–Hiitola–Jaakkima–Sortavala–Matkaselkä–Värtsilä (240 km (150 mi)) to the Soviet Union. Only the Joensuu–Niirala section (71 km (44 mi)) remained in Finland.

Later, Finland has built a new railway leading from Luumäki on the old Riihimäki-Saint Petersburg railroad to Onkamo, which lies on the remaining Finnish part of old Viipuri–Joensuu railroad between Niirala and Joensuu. From Lappeenranta via Simpele to Elisenvaara, there was already a railroad before the war, and in 1947, a track was built from Simpele to Parikkala connecting this one and the old Savonlinna-Elisenvaara railroad, which also had been split by the new border. The sections from Luumäki to Lappeenranta and from Parikkala to Onkamo were built on the 1960s.

== Branches ==
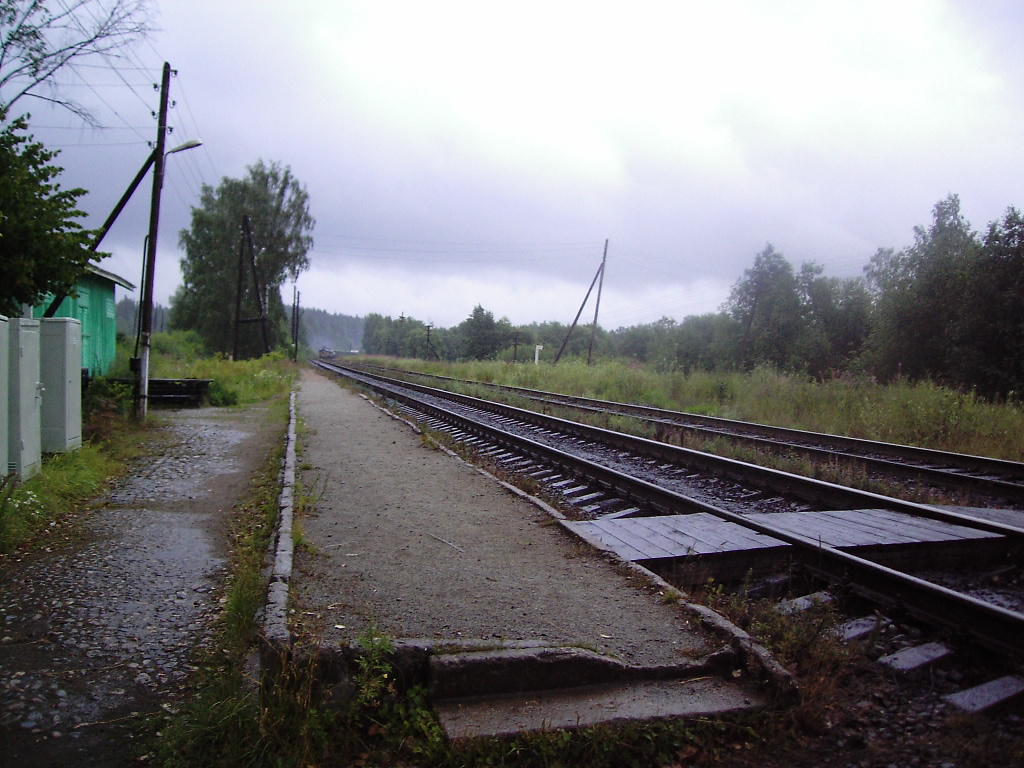
Kuokkaniemi

- The Vyborg railway station also serves a number of other railroads.
- At Antrea a 39-kilometre (24 mi) railway to Vuoksenniska branches off from this line. After 1940 and 1944 the Antrea–Enso section (26 km (16 mi)) was ceded to Soviet Union. As of 2007, projects are being discussed to construct a freight railway along the northern shore of the Vuoksi River linking Kamennogorsk (Antrea) to the Losevo station of the Saint Petersburg–Hiitola railroad in order to ship Russian crude oil to the sea port of Primorsk bypassing the St. Petersburg–Vyborg line.
- At Hiitola (kilometre 93) the Karelian railway merges with the Saint Petersburg-Hiitola railroad.
- The Elisenvaara station was linked to Savonlinna and ultimately Vaasa in Finland. The track meets the new Karelian railroad in Parikkala, on the Finnish side of the border, but the line is closed for traffic and the tracks have been removed in Finnish side to the border. On the Russian side the line 13 kilometres (8.1 mi) from Elisenvaara to Syväoro still exists; and Sorjo station – 7 kilometres (4.3 mi) from Elisenvaara – serves as a local border guard station.
- The Simpele–Elisenvaara section (22 km (14 mi)) of the Vuoksenniska–Elisenvaara line was lifted after 1944. This section is used as a local road. It had stations and stops at Simpele (km 100), Koitsansalo halt (km 108), Lamminsalo (now Ketrovaara) (km 111), Haapavaara halt (km 114), and Elisenvaara (km 122). Recently, reconstruction and reopening of the Luumäki–Lappeenranta–Imatra–Simpele–Elisenvaara–Sortavala–Matkaselkä–Suoyarvi–Tomitsy section was proposed, including electrification at 25 kV 50 Hz AC and track doubling, to connect Imatra and Petrozavodsk.
- There is an 11-kilometre (6.8 mi)-long industrial railroad, completed in 1911, branching off at Lahdenpohja from the Karelian railroad to the shore of Lake Ladoga.
- In 1921 a 139-kilometre (86 mi) railroad linking Matkaselkä (km 215) to Naistenjärvi was built, which was later in turn linked to Pitkäranta, Kostomuksha and Petrozavodsk.
- In the Finnish part of the railroad there is a Säkäniemi–Imatra–Kouvola connection using the new Karelian railroad along the border.

== Proposed project ==
=== Upgrading ===
- Luumäki–Lappeenranta–Imatra–Simpele: Track doubling
- Elisenvaara–Sortavala–Matkaselkä–Suoyarvi–Tomitsy: Track doubling and electrification at 25kV 50 Hz AC

=== New line ===
- Simpele–Elisenvaara: reopening

== Trains ==
In Russia the railroad is used to ship petroleum to the ports of the Gulf of Finland as well as lumber and iron ore pellets from Karelia.

=== Passenger trains ===
| Route | Time | Notes |
|---|---|---|
| Vyborg–Kamennogorsk | 1:20 | |
| Vyborg–Kamennogorsk–Svetogorsk | 1:35 | |
| Vyborg–Hiitola | 3:00 | |
| Sortavala–Hiitola–Kuznecnoye | 2:20 | Sortavala to Hiitola |
| St. Petersburg (Ladozhsky Rail Terminal)–Hiitola–Sortavala–Kostomuksha | 2:45 | Hiitola to Sortavala |

Note: Times, as of 2007, are with all stops and are approximate.

== See also ==
- Saint Petersburg-Hiitola railroad
