= Khiytola =

Khiytola Хийтола
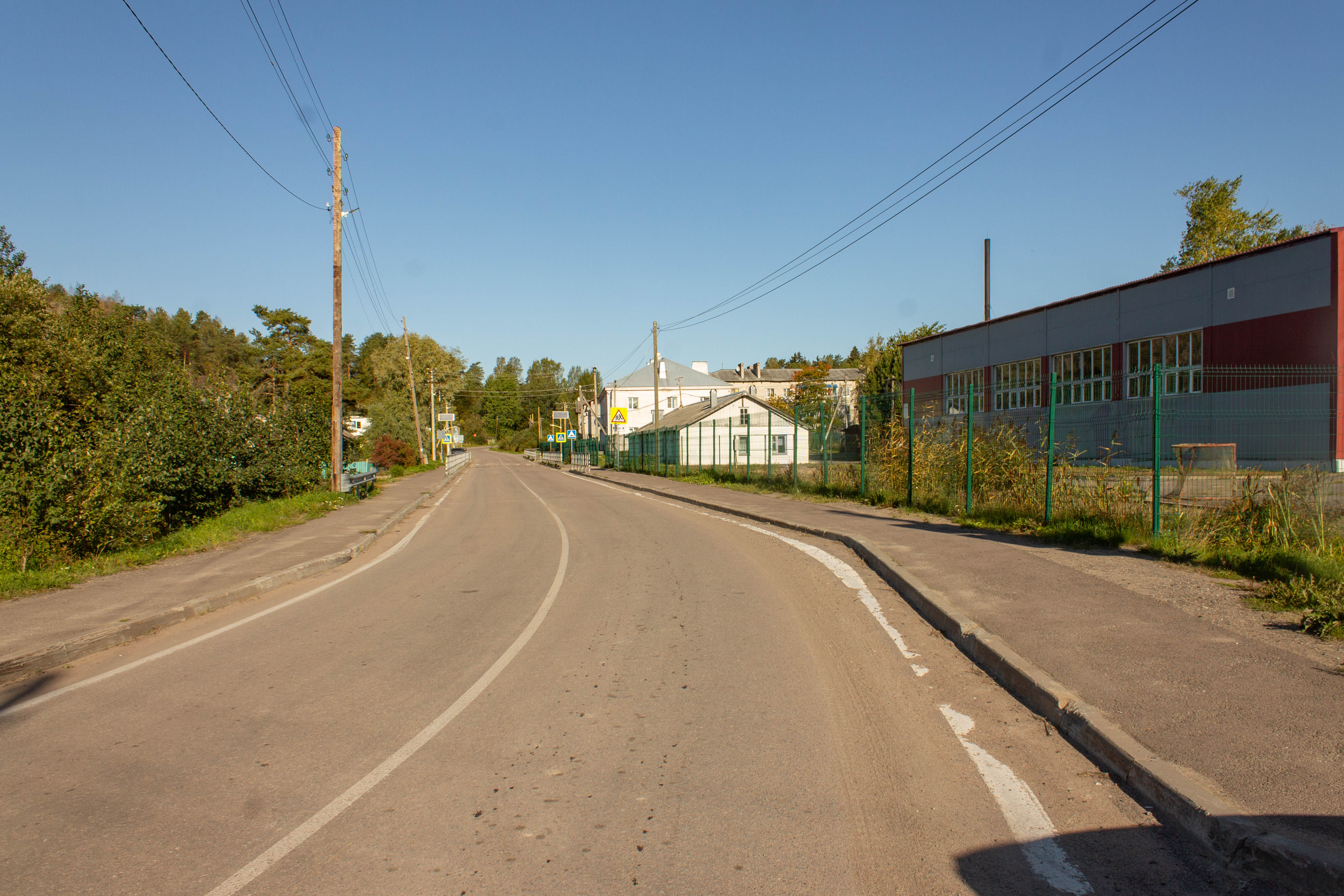
- Lenina Street in Hiitola
- Interactive map of Khiytola
- Location of Khiytola Khiytola (Karelia)
- Coordinates: 61°14′24″N 29°41′21″E
- Country: Russia
- Federal subject: Republic of Karelia

Population
  - Estimate (2021): 586 )
- Time zone: UTC+3 (UTC+03:00)
- Postal code: 186700
- OKTMO ID: 86618433101

Khiytola (Russian: Хийтола; Finnish: Hiitola) is a rural locality (a settlement) in Lakhdenpokhsky District of the Republic of Karelia, Russia.

== History ==
The Finnish name of the settlement (Hiitola) derives from "Hiisi", the name of a forest spirit in Karelian-Finnish mythology.

Before the Winter War it was a municipality of the Viipuri Province of Finland.

During World War II, the settlement was captured by forces of VII Corps (Hägglund) on 11 August 1941 and came under Finnish occupation. With the Moscow Armistice of 1944, the town's continued allegiance to the USSR was confirmed.

== Transportation ==
Khiytola railway station is a railway junction of the Vyborg–Joensuu and St. Petersburg–Khiytola railways. It has direct suburban connections with Vyborg, Sortavala, and Kuznechnoye. A long-distance train between St. Petersburg and Kostomuksha calls at Khiytola every second day.

== Notable people ==
- Eeva Kilpi (1928–2026), feminist writer
- Martti Talvela (1935–1989), opera singer (see, for example, Pekka Hako, The Unforgettable Martti Talvela/Unohtumaton Martti Talvela, 2005)
