= Kamennogorsk =

Town in Leningrad Oblast, Russia

Kamennogorsk Каменногорск
- Town
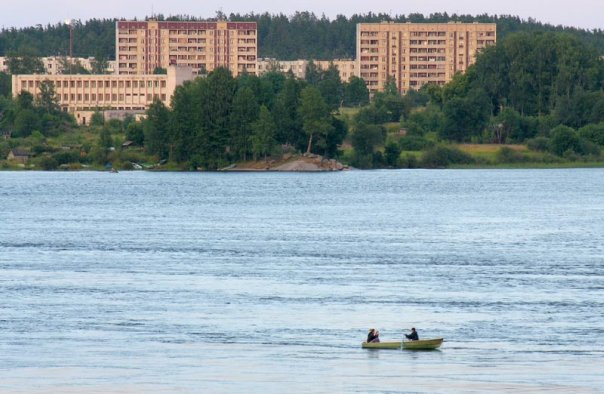
- Panorama of Kamennogorsk across the Vuoksi River

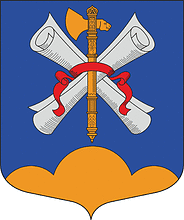
- Coat of arms
- Interactive map of Kamennogorsk
- Location of Kamennogorsk Kamennogorsk (Leningrad Oblast)
- Coordinates: 60°57′N 29°08′E
- Country: Russia
- Federal subject: Leningrad Oblast
- Administrative district: Vyborgsky District
- Settlement municipal formationSelsoviet: Kamennogorskoye Settlement Municipal Formation
- Town status since: 1940
- Elevation: 20 m (66 ft)

Population (2010 Census)
  - Total: 6,739
  - Estimate (2024): 7,009 (+4%)

Administrative status
  - Capital of: Kamennogorskoye Settlement Municipal Formation

Municipal status
  - Municipal district: Vyborgsky Municipal District
  - Urban settlement: Kamennogorskoye Urban Settlement
  - Capital of: Kamennogorskoye Urban Settlement
- Time zone: UTC+3 (MSK)
- Postal code: 188950
- OKTMO ID: 41615106001
- Website: www.kamennogorsk.vbglenobl.ru

Kamennogorsk (Russian: Каменногорск; known before 1948 by the Finnish name of Antrea (Russian: Антреа; Swedish: Sankt Andree)), is a town in Vyborgsky District of Leningrad Oblast, Russia, located on the Karelian Isthmus on the left bank of the Vuoksi River (Lake Ladoga's basin) 170 kilometers (110 mi) northwest of St. Petersburg. Population: 6,739 (2010 census); 6,084 (2002 census); 5,694 (1989 Soviet census).

== History ==
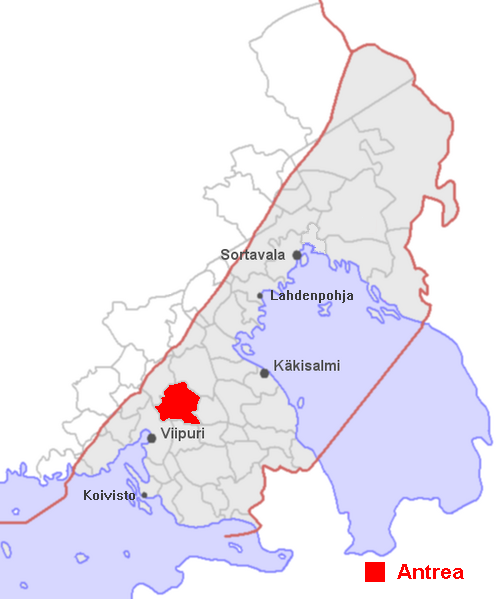
Location of Antrea in Finland between 1869 and 1940. The area transferred to the Soviet Union after the Winter War is shown in grey.

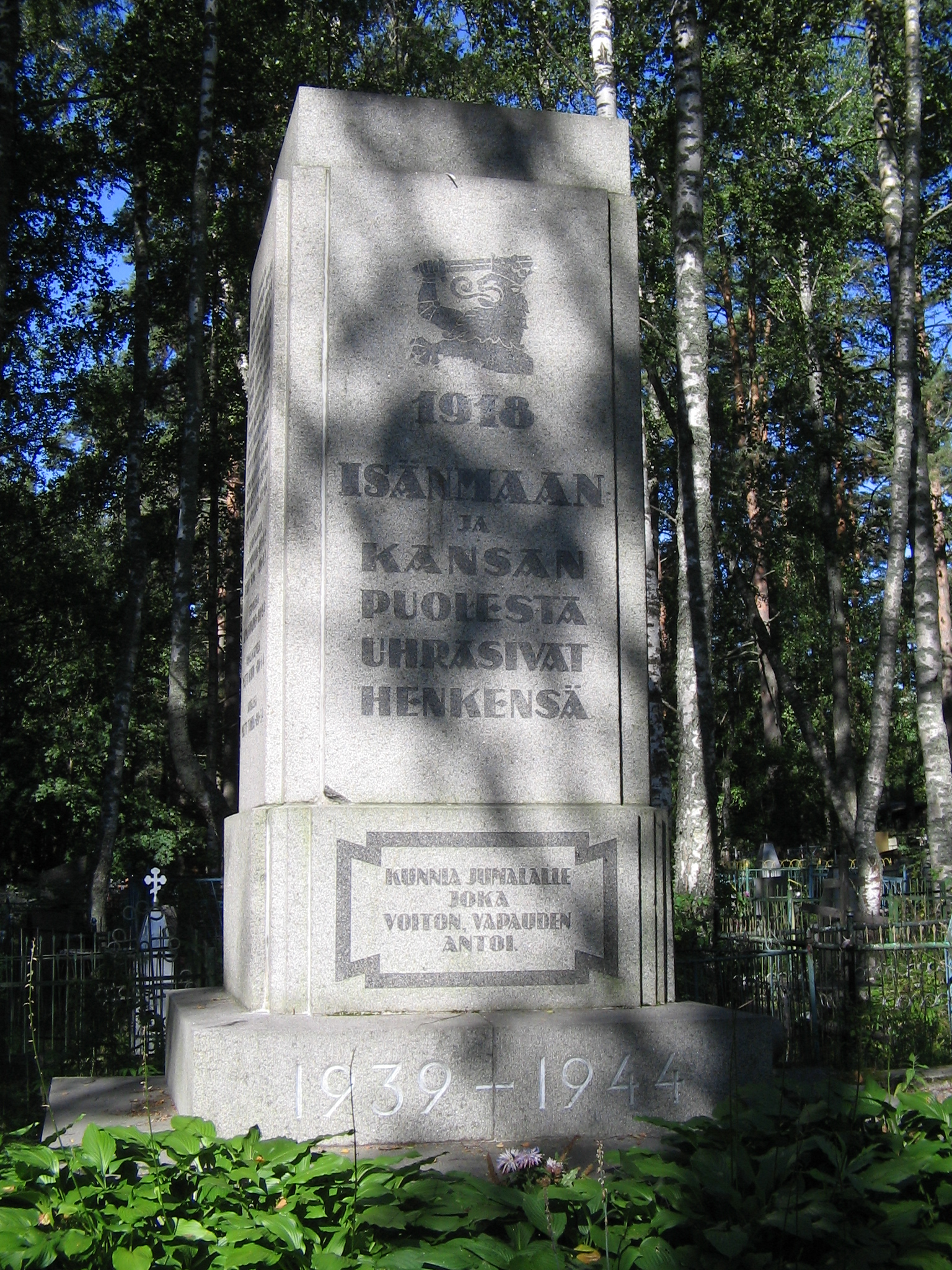
Grave and memorial to the Finns who died in the Civil War in Kamennogorsk. The inscription reads: "For the Fatherland and the Nation they gave their lives" and "Honor to the God who gave victory and freedom." The years of the later wars (1939-1944) appear to be a later addition.

Human habitation in the area where Kamennogorsk now stands goes back to the Stone Age. In the beginning of the 20th century, a Stone Age site was discovered under a layer of peat. Findings at the site included wooden and flint implements, polished instruments of shale, remains of net of nettle fibers, sixteen fishing floats of piny bark, thirty-one stone plummets, a long bone dagger, and remains of nets with a length of 27 meters (89 ft) and a width of up to 3 meters (9.8 ft).

In the 14th-17th centuries, Antrea was a main administrative center of Karelian settlements on the upper Vuoksi. The name comes from Lutheran community founded in the 17th century and the church of St. Andrew.

In 1710, during the Great Northern War, the troops of Tsar Peter the Great included the whole area of the modern Vyborgsky District to Russia. In the course of Peter's second administrative reform, Antrea became a part of Vyborg Province of St. Petersburg Governorate. The 1721 Treaty of Nystad, which concluded the war with Sweden, finalized the transfer of this part of Old Finland to Russia.

In 1744, Vyborg Governorate, with the seat in Vyborg, was established. After several changes, Vyborg Governorate was renamed Finland Governorate in 1802. In 1812, it was renamed back and included in the Grand Duchy of Finland, which was previously ceded to Russia by Sweden. In Finland, it became known as the Viipuri Province. In 1918, the Viipuri Province became a part of independent Finland.

Antrea, together with the rest of the Karelian Isthmus, was ceded by Finland to the Soviet Union by the Moscow Peace Treaty as a result of the Winter War. It was recaptured by Finns between 1941 and 1944 during Continuation War but was again ceded to the Soviet Union after Moscow Armistice. This secession was formalized after signing Paris Peace Treaty in 1947. The population was resettled to Finland, and population from Central Russia was resettled to populate the Karelian Isthmus.

In 1940, Antrea became a part of newly established Yaskinsky District with the administrative center in the work settlement of Yaski. At the same time, it was granted town status. At that time, it was a part of the Karelian ASSR (after March 30, 1940 of the Karelo-Finnish SSR). On November 24, 1944, Yaskinsky District was transferred from Karelo-Finnish SSR to Leningrad Oblast. To replace Finnish names of the localities with Russian names, on October 1, 1948, the district was renamed Lesogorsky and the town of Antrea was renamed Kamennogorsk. The town's new name was due to the presence of crystalline deposit outcrops and a granite mine in the vicinity. On December 9, 1960, Lesogorsky District was abolished and merged into Vyborgsky District.

== Administrative and municipal status ==
Within the framework of administrative divisions, it is, together with twenty-nine rural localities, incorporated within Vyborgsky District as Kamennogorskoye Settlement Municipal Formation. As a municipal division, Kamennogorskoye Settlement Municipal Formation is incorporated within Vyborgsky Municipal District as Kamennogorskoye Urban Settlement.

== Economy ==
=== Industry ===
A large quarry for extraction of grey granite is situated in Kamennogorsk. Also there is an offset paper factory, which before the war was used for producing sugar from sugar beets.

=== Transportation ===
The town has a railway station on the railway line connecting Vyborg and Khiytola (the old Vyborg–Joensuu railroad). Another railway branches up north to Svetogorsk; the continuation beyond Svetogorsk to the Finnish–Russian border is disused. All these railways are served by suburban trains. A new railway to Sosnovo and Losevo is under construction.

The town is connected by roads with Vyborg, Svetogorsk, and Melnikovo.

== Notable people ==
- Matti Kekki, agronomist and politician
- Antti Litja, actor
- Sinikka Luja-Penttilä (born 1924), Finnish politician and writer
- Vaino Olavi Partanen Received Cross of Valour
