= Volchya =

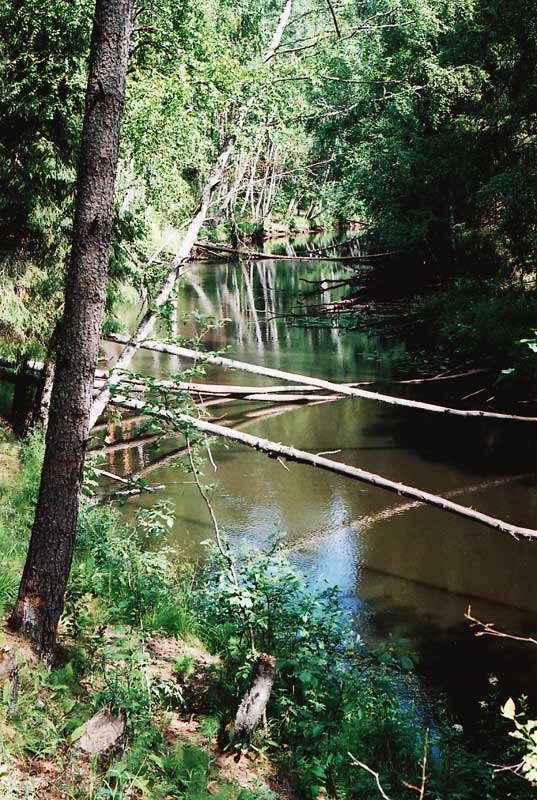

Location
- Country: Russia

Physical characteristics
- Source
  - location: Lembolovo Heights
- Mouth: Vuoksi
  - location: near Losevo
  - coordinates: 60°39′50″N 30°00′12″E
  - elevation: 7 m (23 ft)
- Length: 50 km (31 mi)
- Basin size: 460 km^{2} (180 sq mi)

Basin features
- Progression: Vuoksi→ Lake Ladoga→ Neva→ Gulf of Finland

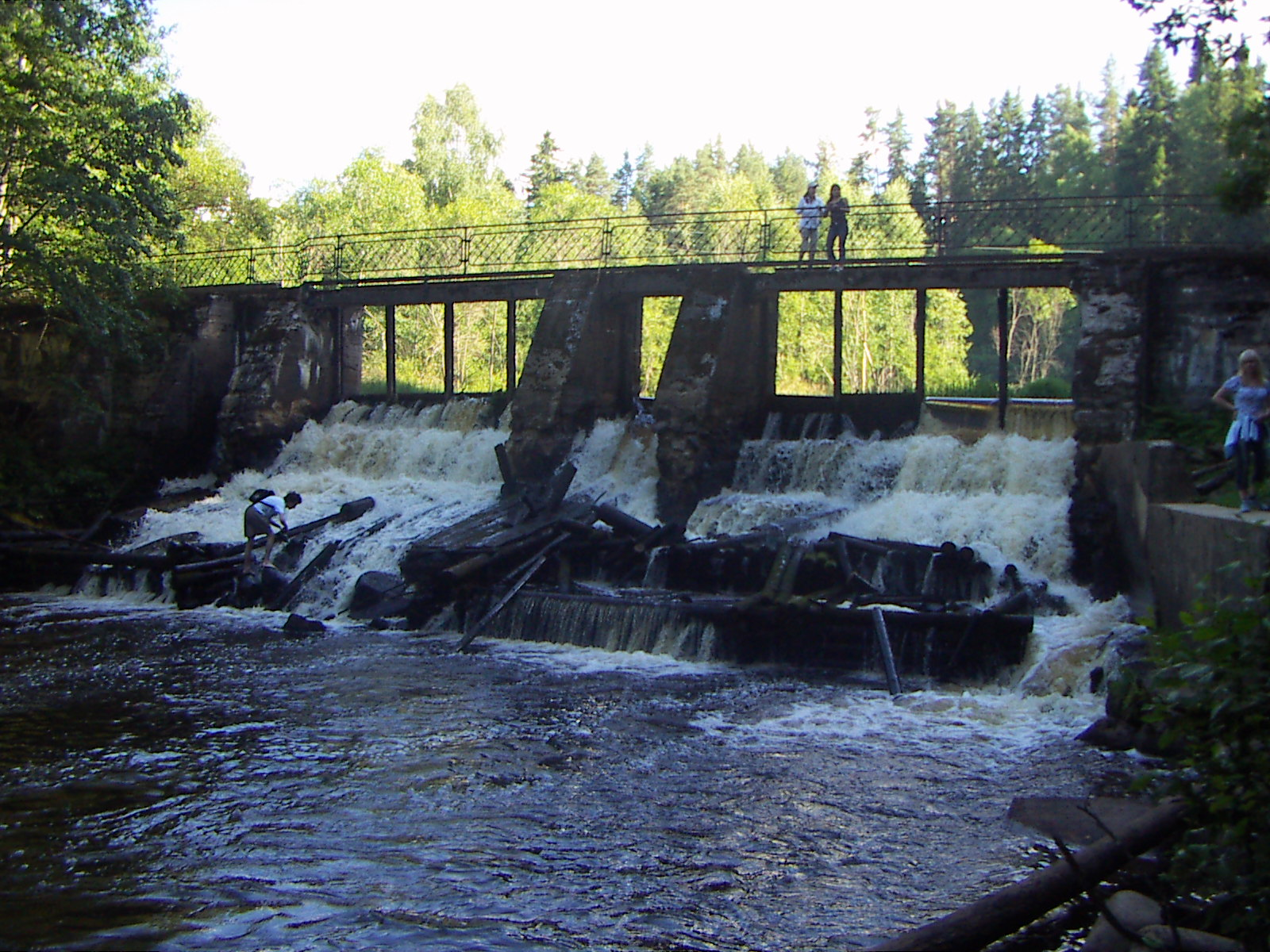
Dam of the old Finnish hydroelectric plant

The Volchya (Finnish: Saijanjoki (Saejoki, Sadejoki, Suenjoki, Sudenjoki); Russian: Волчья) is a tributary of the Vuoksi on the Karelian Isthmus (Leningrad Oblast, Russia) 0.25 to 12 kilometres (0.16 to 7.46 mi) west of the Saint Petersburg-Hiitola railroad (along the section between the stations Vaskelovo and Losevo) and flowing northwards from the Lembolovo Heights. It is 50 kilometres (31 mi) long, and has a drainage basin of 460 square kilometres (180 sq mi). Its major tributaries are in turn the Smorodinka (right, Finnish: Tungelmanjoki; Russian: Смородинка), the Belaya (left, Finnish: Valkjoki; Russian: Белая), the Goryunets (left, Russian: Горюнец) and the Petrovka (right, Finnish: Petäjoki, Petojoki, Peto-oja; Russian: Петровка). The Volchya River's width is about 10 metres (33 ft) in the lower reaches, where it flows in a narrow valley, with meanders and oxbow lakes. The Volchya is shallow and unavailable for navigation (except for canoeing in some places)

The river is crossed by the Sosnovo (Finnish: Rautu) – Pervomayskoye (Finnish: Kivennapa) road on Lembolovo Heights, Sosnovo – Borisovo (Finnish: Nurmijärvi) – Michurinskoye (Finnish: Valkjärvi) road at Razdolye (Finnish: Mäkrälä) and by the Losevo (Finnish: Kiviniemi) – Yagodnoye (Finnish: Vaalimo) road at the lower portion of the river.

Since 1928 there is a little hydroelectric plant on the river not far from Petäjärvi (now Petrovskoye), which was the largest private hydroelectric facility in pre-Winter War Finland (owned by Leonard Sääksjärvi).

The entire river was a boundary between the Kingdom of Sweden and Novgorod Republic as defined in 1323 in the Treaty of Nöteborg. The higher reaches of the Saijanjoki (Volchya) to the south of the Tungelmanjoki (Smorodinka) and the Tungelmanjoki itself constituted part of the Russia-Finland border in 1811–1940. Now that stretch of the Volchya River divides Priozersky and Vyborgsky District from Vsevolozhsky District, while the Smorodinka marks another part of the boundary between Priozersky District and Vsevolozhsky District.

The river was renamed from the Saijanjoki to the Volchya (lit. Wolf River) in 1948, just like the vast majority of other Finnish hydronyms and toponyms on the territories ceded by Finland to the Soviet Union as a result of the Continuation War.
