= Suvanto =

Suvanto may refer to:

- Suvanto, Finnish name for Lake Sukhodolskoye
- 1927 Suvanto, stony Eunomian asteroid from the central region of the asteroid belt
- David Suvanto, Swedish ice hockey player
