= Aeroflot Flight 3739 (1988) =

1988 aircraft hijacking

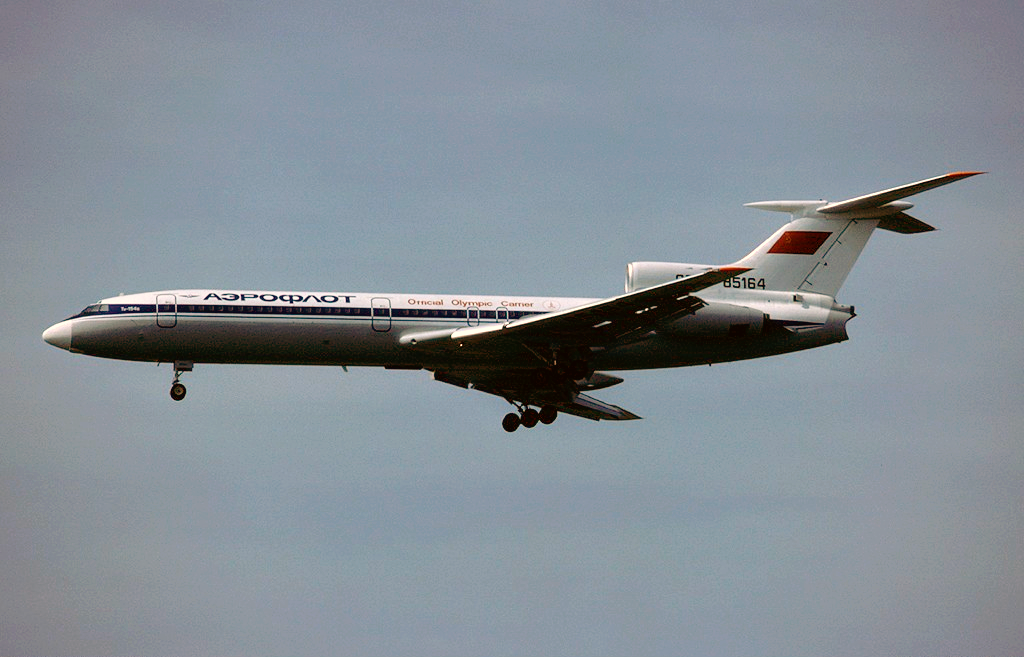
- Aeroflot Tupolev Tu-154B, similar to that involved in the incident

Hijacking
- Date: 8 March 1988
- Summary: Hijacking
- Site: Veshevo Air Base, Veshchevo, Vyborgsky District, Leningrad Oblast, Russian SFSR, USSR

Aircraft
- Aircraft type: Tupolev Tu-154B
- Operator: Aeroflot
- Call sign: AEROFLOT 3739
- Registration: CCCP-85413
- Flight origin: Irkutsk Airport, Irkutsk, Irkutsk Oblast, Russian SFSR, USSR
- Stopover: Kurgan Airport, Kurgan, Kurgan Oblast, Russian SFSR, USSR
- Destination: Pulkovo Airport, Leningrad, Russian SFSR, USSR
- Occupants: 84
- Passengers: 76
- Crew: 8
- Fatalities: 9 (including 5 of the hijackers)
- Injuries: 20 to 36
- Survivors: 75

Aeroflot Flight 3739 was a Soviet domestic passenger flight from Irkutsk to Leningrad (now Saint Petersburg) with a stopover in Kurgan. On 8 March 1988, after the Tupolev Tu-154 operating the flight had left Kurgan, it was hijacked by the Ovechkin family, whose members sought to defect from the Soviet Union.

The Ovechkin family demanded the crew fly the aircraft to London. However, the flight engineer persuaded them to allow a stopover in Finland for refueling. The aircraft instead landed at the Soviet military airbase Veshchevo, near the Finnish border, where it was stormed by the incident response team of the Soviet interior ministry. During the incident, a flight attendant (Tamara Zharkaya) was shot dead on the orders of the Ovechkin matriarch and three hostages were killed during the storming of the aircraft. Five hijackers committed suicide. Two surviving prosecutable members of the family were sentenced to eight and six years in prison, respectively. Zharkaya was posthumously awarded the Order of the Red Banner as a result of the incident.

== Background ==
The Ovechkin family were from Sosnovka in what is now Perm Krai. At the time of the incident the family consisted of twelve members: mother Nina (Ninel) and her eleven children (seven sons and four daughters). One of the daughters, Lyudmila, did not participate in the hijacking as she was married and lived in another city. After giving birth to the tenth of her eleven children, Ninel was awarded the Soviet distinction of "Mother Heroine".

Following the death of her husband Dmitry in 1984, Ninel raised her children by herself in Irkutsk, Irkutsk Oblast. The boys started a local music band called the Seven Simeons. Following the band's tour of Japan, the Ovechkin family decided to leave the Soviet Union and settle abroad, which was usually not allowed by the government. Rather than seek asylum in Japan or another country and/or refuse to return, the Ovechkins decided to hijack an aircraft. They left a note claiming they were going to meet relatives and boarded a Aeroflot airliner flying from Irkutsk to Leningrad (now Saint Petersburg).

== Hijacking ==
Preparing for hijacking, the Ovechkins acquired arms and made two sawed-off shotguns from them. In case of failure, the Ovechkins decided to blow themselves up rather than face arrest. The family hid their weapons and explosive devices in a double bass, which could not be scanned by airport security devices due to its size.

They had previously checked the security system during a test flight to Leningrad. During the boarding on Flight 3739, airport personnel offered to place the double bass in the luggage section; the Ovechkins refused and paid extra for it to be transported in the cabin. The double bass was checked visually and allowed in the cabin.

Before landing in Leningrad, near Vologda, the flight crew received a note from the hijackers through a flight attendant reading: "Proceed to England (London). Do not descend. Otherwise we will blow up the plane. You are under our control." (The note was subsequently burned in the cabin.) The captain transmitted a distress signal and reported the emergency to Vologda air traffic control.

On the ground, Operation Nabat ("Alarm Bell") was commenced. One of the flight attendants informed the passengers that they were about to land in the Finnish city of Kotka, when in fact the ground services ordered the captain to land at the Soviet air base at Veshchevo. The flight engineer had earlier persuaded the hijackers that the aircraft needed to refuel in order to reach London.

Shortly before landing, the hijackers realized that they were in fact still in Soviet territory. One of the hijackers, Dmitry Ovechkin Jr., killed flight attendant Tamara Zharkaya (aged 28). After the aircraft landed, five incident response team members in bulletproof vests stormed the cockpit. From there, eyewitnesses reported, they fired indiscriminately into the cabin. Another group stormed the aircraft from the rear. One of the Ovechkins shouted via the intercom to the crew: "Commander, tell them not to shoot!"

During the storming of the aircraft, Alexander Ovechkin detonated his explosive device and died; the explosion had limited effect and only led to a fire in the aircraft's tail section which was extinguished by crew.

Ninel Ovechkin, who had ordered her sons to kill her and themselves in case of failure, was shot dead by the oldest son Vasily (aged 26). He immediately killed himself afterwards. Three brothers, Dmitry (aged 24), Oleg (aged 21), and Aleksandr (aged 19) let off a hand-made bomb, causing a fire in the plane, and then shot themselves. 17-year-old Igor hid in a toilet to save his life. 28-year-old pregnant Olga Ovechkin and her four youngest siblings (Tatiana, aged 14; Mikhail, aged 13; Ulyana, aged 10; and Sergei, aged 9), also survived.

In addition to Zharkaya, fatalities among the hostages included three passengers (two women, aged 69 and 70, and a 24 year old man) who were accidentally killed during the storming of the aircraft. About twenty passengers were injured (thirty-six according to another estimate). Fourteen passengers were severely injured.

== Aftermath ==
The two oldest surviving Ovechkins, Igor and Olga, were tried on 6 September 1988, and sentenced to eight and six years in prison, respectively. While in prison, Olga Ovechkina gave birth to a daughter, Larisa. Olga was beaten to death by her boyfriend on 8 June 2003.

In the aftermath of the hijacking, the norms of Soviet airport security were revised and the safety of hostages was prioritised. The revised practices prevented deaths, particularly during the 1988 Ordzhonikidze bus hijacking and the 1990 Soviet aircraft hijackings.

Zharkaya, who had tried to appease the hijackers but was ultimately killed by one of them, received the Order of the Red Banner posthumously.

== In popular culture ==
The incident was adapted into the 1999 film Mother by Russian director Denis Yevstigneyev.
