= Zhitkovo =

Settlement in Vyborgsky District, Russia

Coordinates: 60°42′N 29°20′E

Zhitkovo (Russian: Житко́во; Finnish: Ristseppälä) is a settlement on Karelian Isthmus, in Vyborgsky District of Leningrad Oblast. It was known as Ristseppälä until 1948. It was a station of the Vyborg–Veshchevo–Zhitkovo–Michurinskoye railroad constructed by Finland in the 1920s. However, the Zhitkovo-Michurinskoye link has been dismantled in the 1950s, and the Veshchevo-Zhitkovo link in 2001.
