= Petrovskoye, Priozersky District, Leningrad Oblast =

Rural locality in Priozersky District, Russia

Coordinates: 60°39′N 30°10′E

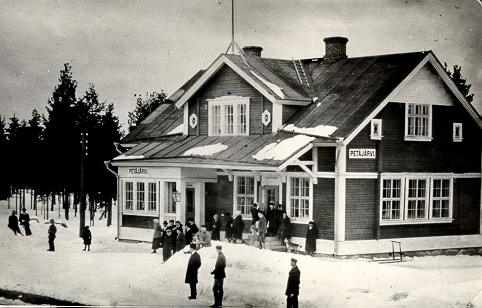
The Petäjärvi railway station in the 1930s

Petrovskoye (Russian: Петровское; Finnish: Petäjärvi) is a rural locality (a settlement) in Priozersky District of Leningrad Oblast, Russia, located on the Karelian Isthmus.

Before the Winter War and the Continuation War, Petäjärvi was a prosperous village of the Sakkola municipality in Viipuri Province of Finland. In 1948, after the war, Petäjärvi was renamed Petrovskoye, but the railway station of the Saint Petersburg-Hiitola railway serving it retained its name, as there had already been another station with the name Petrovskoye in Leningrad Oblast.

In 1928, not far from Petäjärvi on the Saijanjoki River, a little hydroelectric plant was constructed, which became the largest private hydroelectric facility in pre-war Finland (owned by Leonard Sääksjärvi).
