= Pribylovo =

Pribylovo (Russian: Прибылово) is the name of several rural localities in Russia:

- Pribylovo, Leningrad Oblast, a settlement in Primorskoye Settlement Municipal Formation of Vyborgsky District in Leningrad Oblast; 60°26′N 28°40′E
  - Pribylovo (air base), nearby Russian Air Force airbase
- Pribylovo, Yaroslavl Oblast, a village in Bolsheselsky Rural Okrug of Bolsheselsky District in Yaroslavl Oblast
