= Karelian Isthmus =

Isthmus in northwestern Russia

Coordinates: 60.5°N 29.9°E

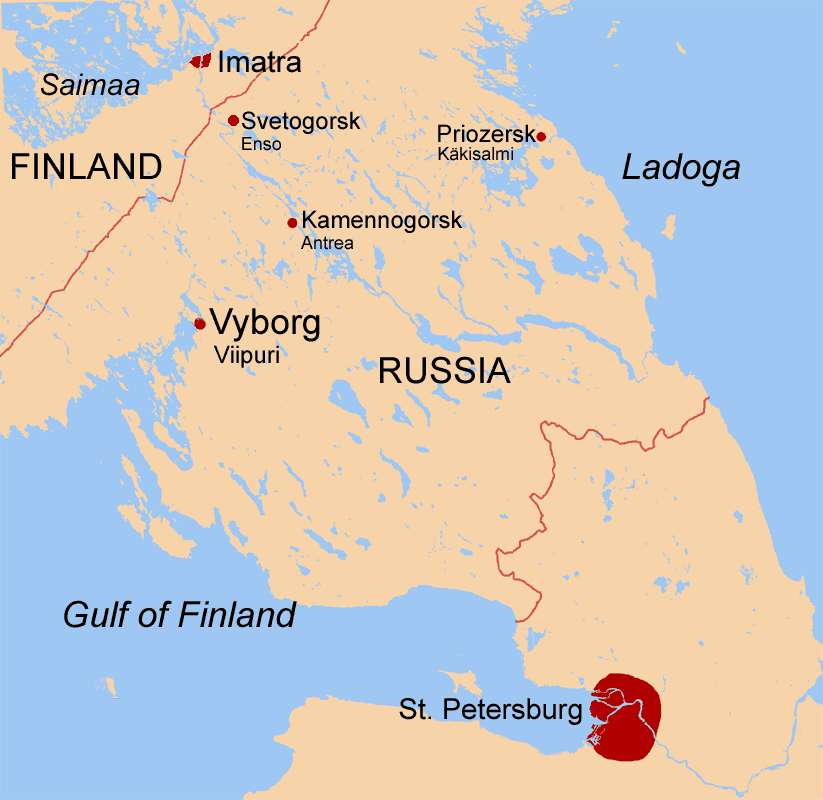
Map of the Karelian Isthmus. Shown are some important towns, the current Finnish-Russian border in the North-West and the pre-Winter War border further South.

The Karelian Isthmus (Russian: Карельский перешеек, romanized: Karelsky peresheyek; Finnish: Karjalankannas; Swedish: Karelska näset) is the approximately 45–110-kilometre-wide (30–70 mi) stretch of land situated between the Gulf of Finland and Lake Ladoga in northwestern Russia, to the north of the River Neva. Its northwestern boundary is a line from the Bay of Vyborg to the westernmost point of Lake Ladoga, Pekonlahti. If the Karelian Isthmus is defined as the entire territory of present-day Saint Petersburg and Leningrad Oblast to the north of the Neva and also a tiny part of the Republic of Karelia, the area of the isthmus is about 15,000 km^{2} (5,800 sq mi).

The smaller part of the isthmus to the southeast of the old Russia-Finland border is considered historically as Northern Ingria, rather than part of the Karelian Isthmus itself. The rest of the isthmus was historically a part of Finnish Karelia. This was conquered by the Russian Empire during the Great Northern War in 1712 and included within the autonomous Grand Duchy of Finland (1809–1917) of the Russian Empire. When Finland became independent in 1917, the isthmus (except for the territory roughly corresponding to present-day Vsevolozhsky District and some districts of Saint Petersburg) remained Finnish. Finnish Karelia was partly ceded to the Soviet Union by Finland following the Winter War (1939–1940) and Continuation War (1941–1944). In 1940–1941, during the Interim Peace, most of the ceded territories in the isthmus were included within the Karelo-Finnish SSR. However, since World War II the entire isthmus has been divided between the city of Saint Petersburg (mostly Kurortny District), as well as Priozersky District, Vsevolozhsky District and Vyborgsky District of Leningrad Oblast.

According to the 2002 census, the population of the Kurortny District of Saint Petersburg and the parts of Leningrad Oblast situated on the Karelian Isthmus amounts to 539,000. Many Saint Petersburg residents also decamp to the Isthmus during their vacations. The main population centers of the Isthmus are Vyborg (Выборг; Finnish: Viipuri; Swedish: Viborg), Priozersk (Приозе́рск; Finnish: Käkisalmi; Swedish: Kexholm) and Primorsk (Примо́рск; Finnish: Koivisto; Swedish: Björkö).

== Geography and wildlife ==
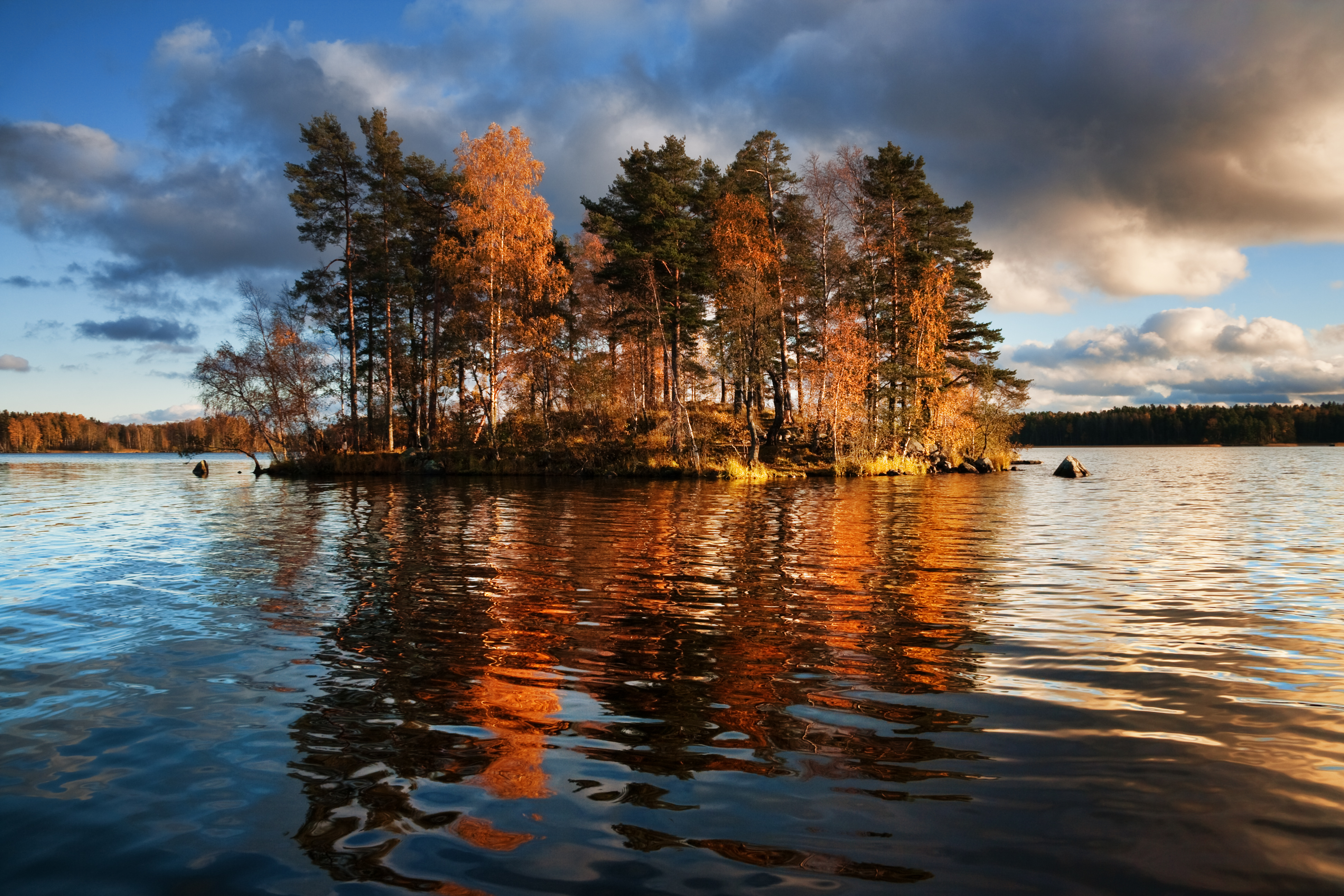
Lake Vuoksa near Priozersk in the autumn of 2009.

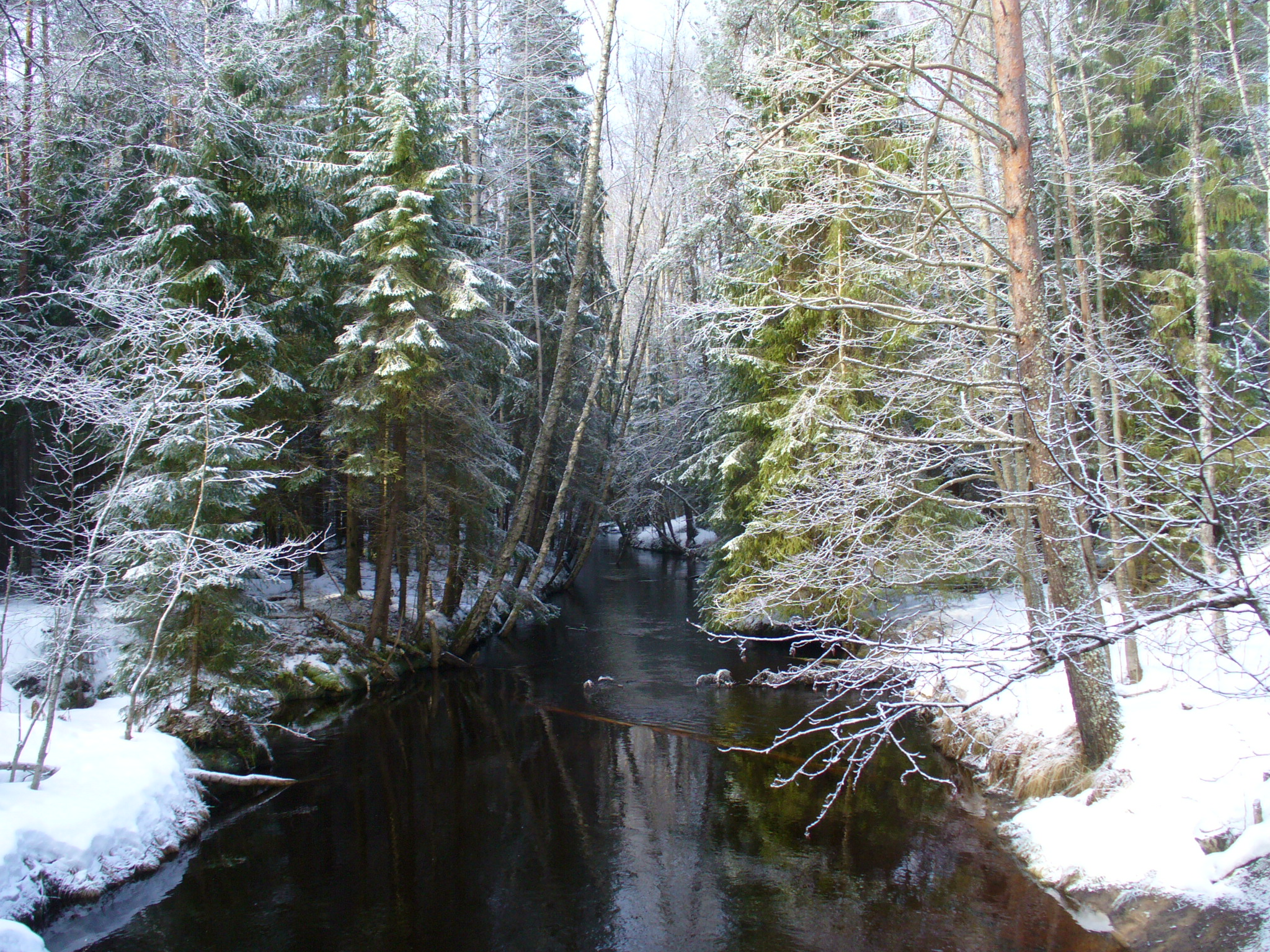
Near Leipäsuo

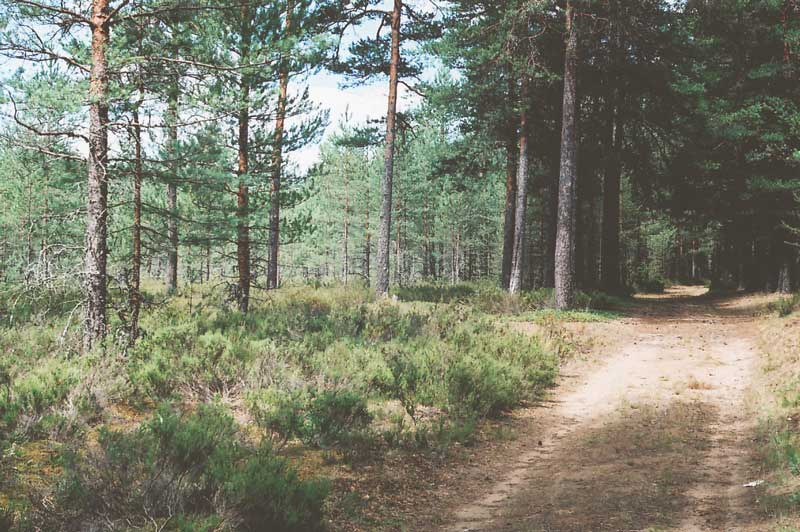
Forest of Pinus sylvestris with an understory of Calluna vulgaris on the Karelian Isthmus

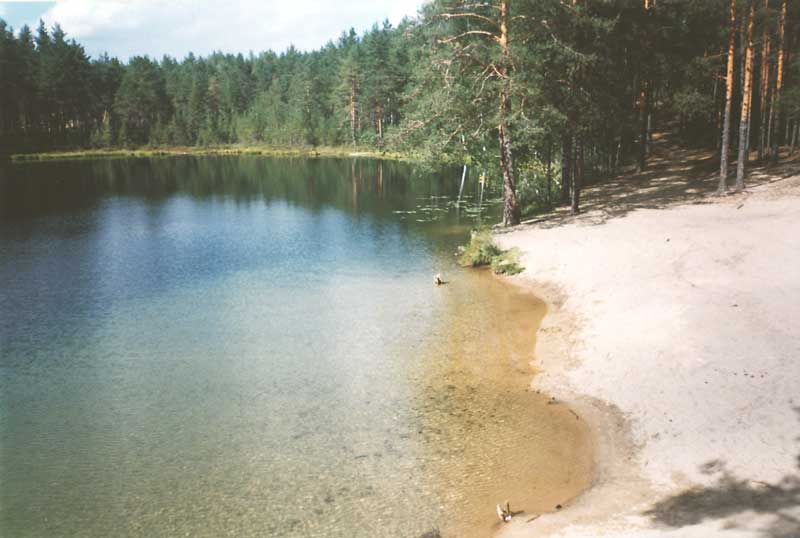
There are about 700 lakes on the isthmus

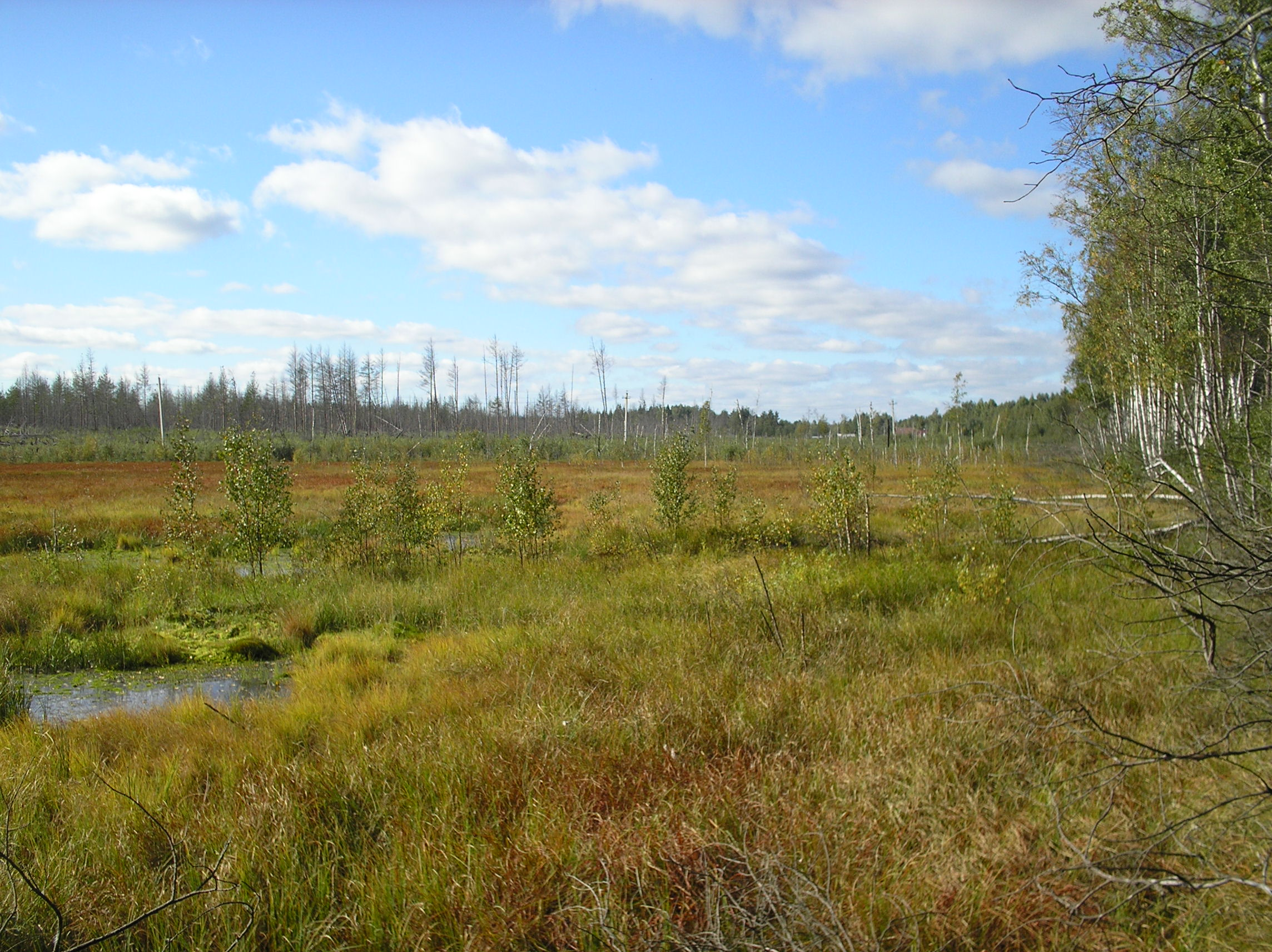
Bog near Komarovo

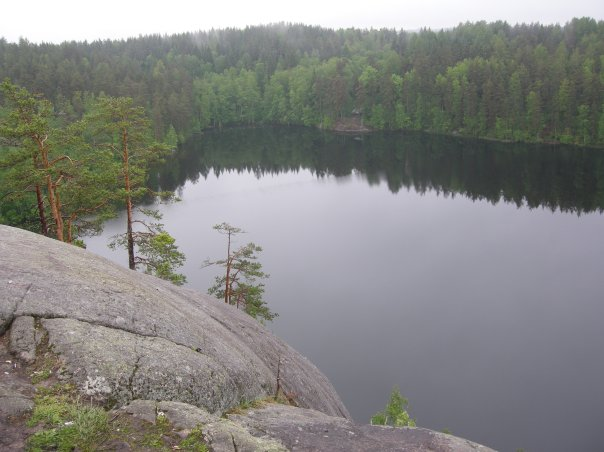
Lake Yastrebinoye

The isthmus' terrain has been influenced dramatically by the Weichselian glaciation. Its highest point lies on the Lembolovo Heights moraine at about 205 m (670 ft). There are no mountains on the isthmus, but steep hills occur in some places.

The Vuoksi, the largest river, runs southeastwards from Lake Saimaa of Finland to Lake Ladoga, dividing the isthmus into two uneven parts. Saimaa Canal opened in 1856 links Lake Saimaa to the Bay of Vyborg passing through the city of Lappeenranta in South Karelia, Finland.

The Karelian Isthmus lies within the ecoregion of Scandinavian and Russian taiga. Geobotanically, it lies at the juncture of the Central European, Eastern European and Northern European floristic provinces of the Circumboreal Region of the Holarctic Kingdom.

The isthmus is mostly covered by coniferous forests formed by Scots pine (Pinus sylvestris) and Norway spruce (Picea abies), with numerous lakes (e.g. Lake Sukhodolskoye and Lake Glubokoye) as well as small grass, fen and Sphagnum raised bogs. Forests cover approximately 11,700 km of the isthmus, more than three quarters of its total area. Swampy areas occupy 5.5 percent of the territory. In the large contiguous area along the shore of Lake Ladoga in Vsevolozhsky District, in the southeastern part of the isthmus, bogs occur much more frequently than in other parts. The same was once true of the lowland along the Neva River, which has since been drained. The soil is predominantly podsol, which contains massive boulders, especially in the north and northwest, where large granite rocky outcrops occur.

Pine forests (with Pinus sylvestris) are the most widespread and occupy 51% of the forested area of the Karelian Isthmus, followed by spruce forests (with Picea abies, 29%) and birch forests (with Betula pendula and B. pubescens, 16%). Stands on more fertile soils and in more favorable locations are occasionally dominated by Norway maple, black alder, grey alder, common aspen, English oak, grey willow, dark-leaved willow, tea-leaved willow, small-leaved lime or European white elm. Common vegetation of various types of pine forests includes heather, crowberry, common juniper, eared willow, lingonberry, water horsetail, bracken, graminoids (i.e. grasses in the wider sense) Avenella flexuosa and Carex globularis, mosses Pleurozium schreberi, Sphagnum angustifolium and S. russowii, and lichens Cladonia spp. Prominent in various spruce forests are wood horsetail, common wood sorrel, bilberry, lingonberry, graminoids Avenella flexuosa, Calamagrostis arundinacea, Carex globularis, and mosses Polytrichum commune and Sphagnum girgensohnii. Prominent vegetation of various birch forests include meadowsweet, common wood sorrel, bilberry and graminoids Calamagrostis arundinacea and C. canescens.

1184 species of wild vascular plants are recorded in the isthmus. See also the List of the vascular plants of the Karelian Isthmus. Red squirrel, moose, red fox, mountain hare and boar (reintroduced) are typical inhabitants of the forests.

The climate of the isthmus is moderately continental, with 650–800 mm (25–32 in) average precipitation per year, long snowy winters lasting from November through mid-April and occasionally reaching about -40 °C (-40 F), moderately cool summers and short frost-free period. Compared to other parts of the Leningrad Oblast, the winter here is usually milder due to the moderating influence of the Gulf of Finland, but longer.

The city of Vyborg and the town of Priozersk are situated on the northwestern part of the isthmus.

The Karelian Isthmus is a popular place for hiking, cycling, skiing (Korobitsyno and Kavgolovo), climbing (near Kuznechnoye), canoeing (Losevo), fishing for consumption (of carp bream, northern pike, roach, European perch, ruffe, burbot and others), mushroom hunting (for porcini, red-capped scaber stalk, birch bolete, velvet bolete, slippery Jack, golden chanterelle, Lactarius resimus, woolly milk-cap, ugly milk-cap, saffron milk-cap, Lactarius rufus, various Russulas and others), berry picking (of bilberry, raspberry, woodland strawberry, cowberry, cranberry, cloudberry, bog bilberry and stone bramble). It is a popular summer resort for Saint Petersburg citizens since the late 19th century, served by trains of Finlyandsky Rail Terminal. The isthmus, especially the land along Saint Petersburg–Vyborg and Saint Petersburg–Priozersk railroads, hosts numerous dachas.

A 20–35 km wide stretch of land in Vyborgsky District and Republic of Karelia to the west of the Vyborg–Hiitola railway, as well as the islands and shores of the Gulf of Vyborg, belongs to the strictly guarded zone of the border control, reaching the shore of Lake Ladoga at Hiitola. In 1993–2006 the zone was formally 5 km wide, although in fact it has always been much wider. Visiting it is forbidden without a permit issued by the FSB (by KGB during the time of the Soviet Union).

=== Geological history ===
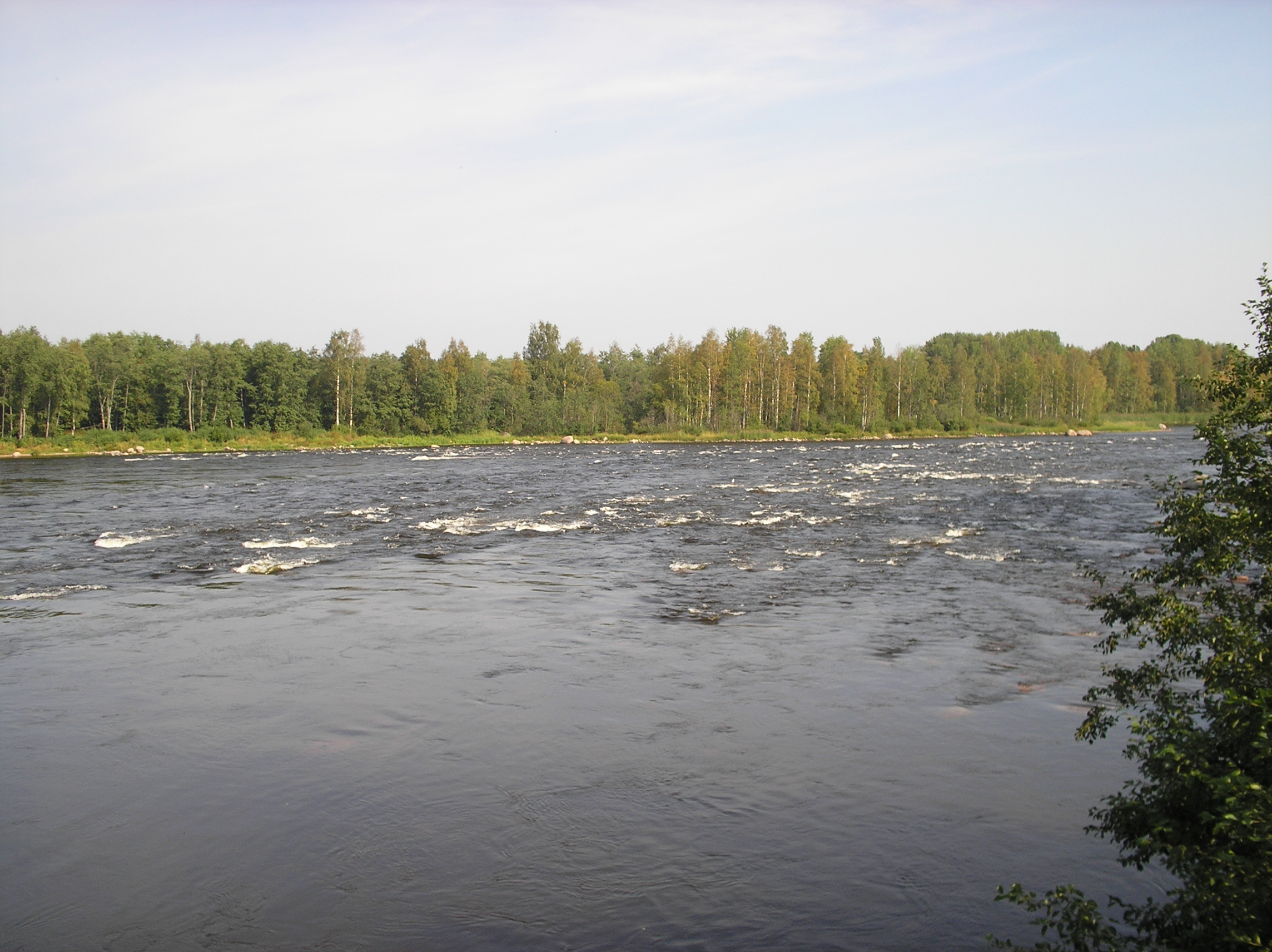
Rapids on the Burnaya River

Geologically the Karelian Isthmus lies on the southern edge of the Baltic Shield's crystalline bedrock. During the final part of the last Weichselian glaciation, deglaciation in the central parts of the Isthmus started as early as 14000 BP, when it formed the bottom of a large lake dammed by the surrounding ice sheet. During further deglaciation, at the time of the Baltic Ice Lake, an early high water stage of the Baltic Sea, when the ice sheet retreated to Salpausselkä, the upland area of the Isthmus remained a large island and many upland lakes emerged.

Prior to 12650 BP, the land was characterized by harsh Arctic conditions with permafrost and sparse vegetation. Steppe-tundra complexes developed after this point. Around 11000 BP climate began to warm and became humid, first pine and birch forests were established.

Around 9000 BP Ancylus Lake, another stage of the Baltic Sea, retreated, and many lowland lakes were also isolated in depressions formed earlier by glacial exaration and fluvioglacial activity. Lake Ladoga was separated from the sea as well. Due to land uplift, around 5000 BP the River Vuoksi started emptying into Lake Ladoga as a new outlet of Lake Saimaa. Lake Ladoga transgressed, flooding lowland lakes and the Vuoksi, and became connected with the sea at Heinjoki (now Veshchevo), to the east of present-day Vyborg. Around 3100–2400 BP the Neva River emerged, draining Lake Ladoga into the Baltic Sea. Ladoga level gradually sank from 15–18 m to its modern position of 4–5 m above sea-level, and lowland lakes were isolated again. However, the Vuoksi still had a significant direct outflow connection to the Bay of Vyborg, possibly as late as in the 12th century AD. The connection disappeared due to ongoing land uplift in the 2nd millennium AD.

In 1818 a canal, which was dug to drain spring flood waters from Lake Suvanto (now Lake Sukhodolskoye, a 40-km long narrow lake in the eastern part of the Isthmus) into Lake Ladoga, unexpectedly eroded and turned into the Taipaleenjoki (now Burnaya River). The Taipaleenjoki started draining Suvanto and decreased its level by 7 m. Originally waters of Lake Suvanto flowed into the Vuoksi River through a waterway at Kiviniemi (now Losevo), but as a result of the change, the waterway dried out. In 1857 the canal was dug there, but the stream reversed direction, revealed rapids and rendered navigation at Kiviniemi impossible. Since 1857 Suvanto and the Taipaleenjoki have constituted the southern armlet of the Vuoksi River, which has decreased the level of the original northern armlet emptying into Ladoga near Kexholm (now Priozersk) by 4 m, isolating it as a separate river basin.

=== Cities, towns and urban-type settlements ===
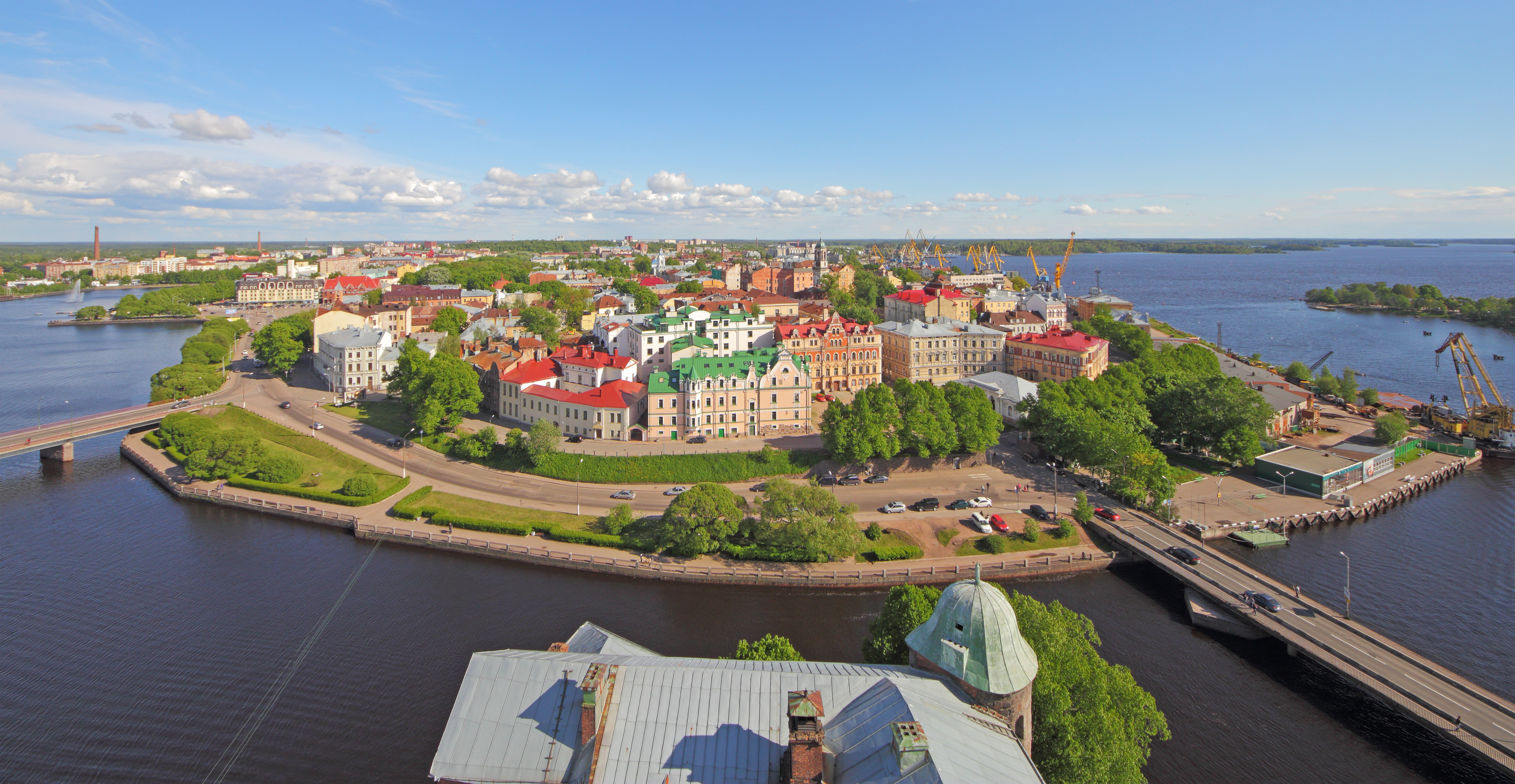
Vyborg as seen from the Castle Tower

Name in Swedish added when it differs from the Finnish.

Kamennogorsk (Finnish: Antrea) (Swedish: S:t Andree)
Kuznechnoye (Kaarlahti)
Lesogorsky (Jääski) Swedish: Jääskis)
Primorsk (Koivisto) Swedish: Björkö)
Priozersk (Käkisalmi) Swedish: Kexholm)
Roshchino (Raivola)
Saint Petersburg (Pietari) Swedish: S:t Petersburg)
Sertolovo (Sierattala)
Sestroretsk (Siestarjoki) Swedish: Systerbäck)
Sovetsky (Johannes) Swedish: S:t Johannes)
Svetogorsk (Enso)
Toksovo (Toksova)
Vsevolozhsk (Seuloskoi)
Vyborg (Viipuri) Swedish: Viborg)
Vysotsk (Uuras)
Zelenogorsk (Terijoki).

== Administrative territorial division ==
The Karelian Isthmus is located in two regions of the Russian Federation, Saint Petersburg and the Leningrad Oblast. Saint Petersburg is represented by seven districts, the Leningrad Oblast by three.

District	Region
District of Vyborg	Lenoblast
District of Priozersk	Lenoblast
District of Vsevolozhsk	Lenoblast
Kurortny District	SPB
Primorsky District	SPB
Vyborgsky District	SPB
Kalininsky District	SPB
Krasnogvardeysky District	SPB
Nevsky District	SPB

== History ==
=== Archaeology ===
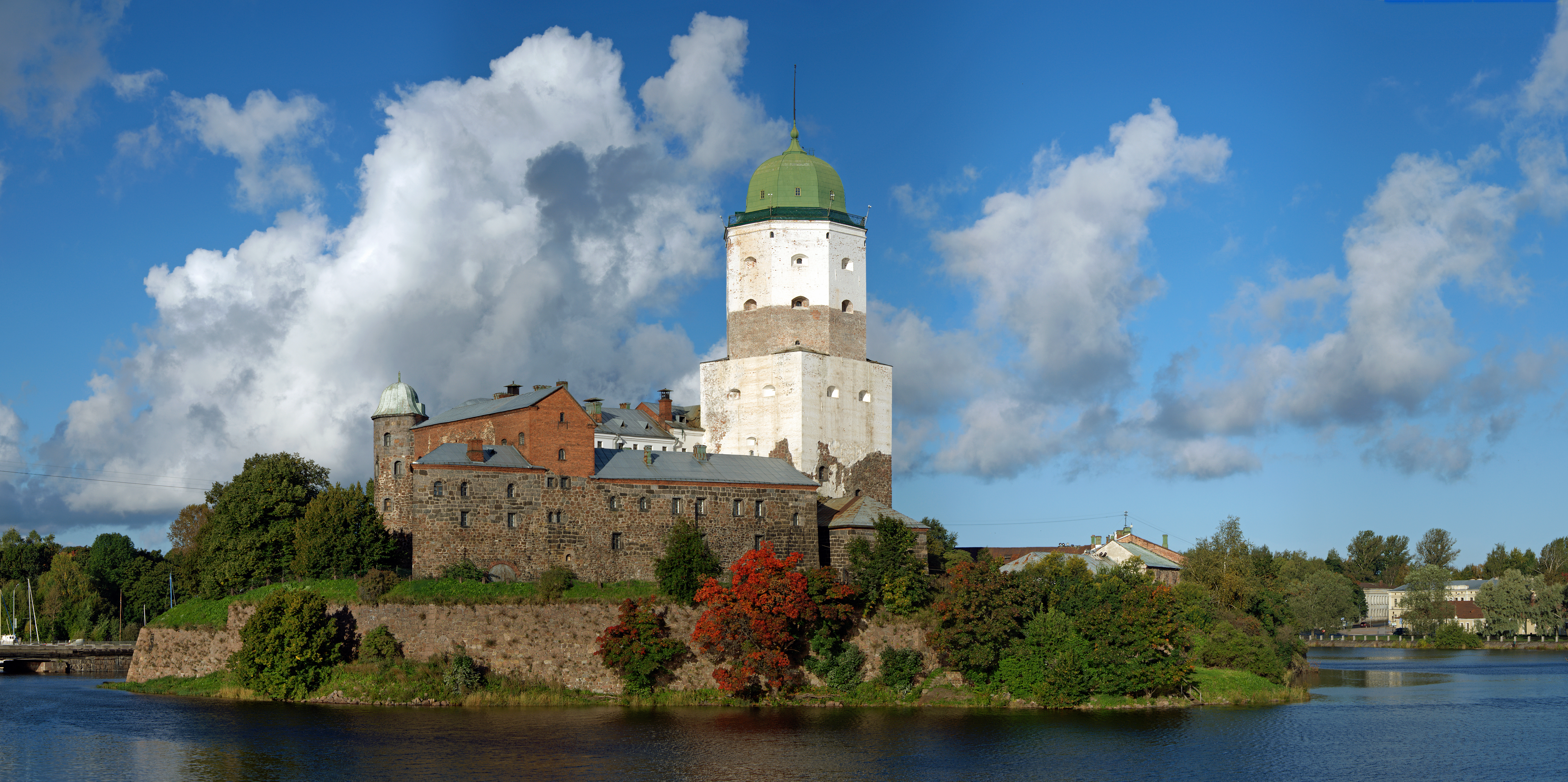
Vyborg Castle

Apart from the old towns of Vyborg and Priozersk, and churches on the Konevets island of Lake Ladoga, since the late 19th century a number of other archaeological sites have been discovered on the isthmus. Numerous archaeological remnants of the Mesolithic, Neolithic, Copper Age and Bronze Age occur all over the isthmus. The eastern part of the Karelian Isthmus hosts a number of medieval remnants. There are many grave pits of Karelians of the 10th–15th centuries with metal and ceramic artifacts along the northern armlet of the Vuoksi, near Lake Sukhodolskoye and in a few other places in Priozersky District. On the southern shore of Lake Sukhodolskoye small medieval burial mounds are abundant as well. A lot of large cult stones have been found along these bodies of water, as well as agglomerations of cairns. Remnants of several rural settlements were also discovered there as well as on the shore of Lake Ladoga. Remnants of the Tiuri (Tiversk) town (10th–15th centuries) were excavated on a former island in the northern Vuoksi armlet near the Tiuri village (now Vasilyevo). A few treasures of silver adornments and medieval Arabian and Western European coins have also been found, as the isthmus laid on the Volga trade route (at that time, the Vuoksi River had a distributary emptying into the Bay of Vyborg).

=== Prehistory and Medieval ===
Ancestors of Baltic Finns wandered to the Karelian Isthmus possibly around 850 CE.

In the 11th century, Sweden and Novgorod Republic started to compete tax holding rights. The Treaty of Nöteborg of 1323 established a border between them along the rivers now known as the Sestra and the Volchya.

=== 17th–20th centuries ===
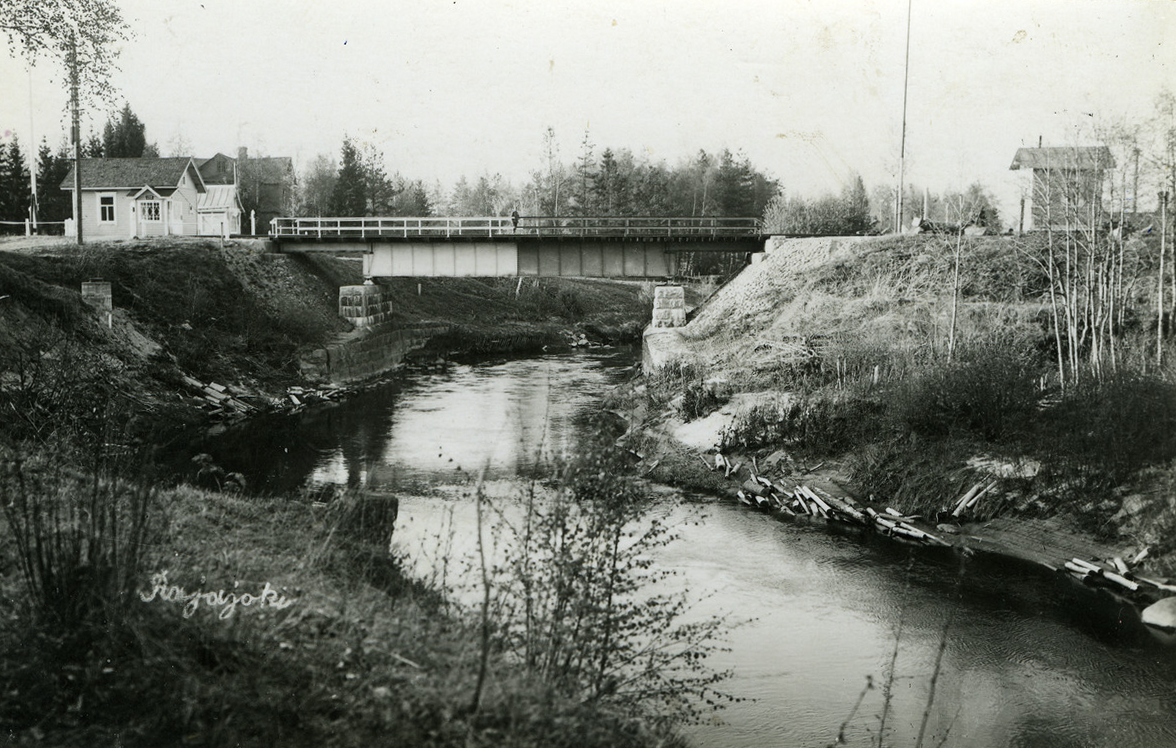
Rajajoki, Finnish-Soviet border in the 1920s

During 17th century Sweden gained the whole isthmus and also Ingria. In this time many Karelians escaped to Tver's Karelia.

From 1721–1917 the isthmus belonged to the Russian Empire, won in the Great Northern War that started with the Russian conquest of Ingria where the new imperial capital, Saint Petersburg, was founded (1703) in the southern end of the isthmus, in place of old Swedish town Nyenskans. Then in 1812, the northwestern half was transferred, as a part of Old Finland, to the Grand Duchy of Finland, created in 1809 as an autonomous part of the Russian Empire.

Due to its size, favorable climate, rich fishing waters and proximity to Saint Petersburg, the capital of the Russian Empire, the Karelian Isthmus became the wealthiest part of Finland once the Industrial Revolution had gained momentum in the 19th century. The railroads Saint Petersburg–Vyborg–Riihimäki (1870), Vyborg–Hiitola–Sortavala (1893), Saint Petersburg–Kexholm–Hiitola (1917) crossed the isthmus, contributing to its economic development. By the end of the 19th century the nearby areas along the Saint Petersburg–Vyborg section had become popular place of summer resort for wealthy Saint Petersburgers.

Ingrian flag

When Finland declared its independence in 1917, the isthmus (except for the territory roughly corresponding to present-day Vsevolozhsky District and some districts of Saint Petersburg) remained Finnish, part of the Viipuri province with its center in Viipuri, the fourth largest Finnish city. A considerable part of the remaining area populated by Ingrian Finns seceded from Bolshevist Russia as the Finland-backed Republic of North Ingria, but was reintegrated with Russia in the end of 1920 according to the conditions of the Treaty of Tartu. In 1928–1939 parts of the isthmus which belonged to Russia constituted the Kuivaisi National District with its center in Toksova, with Finnish as the official language, according to the policy of national delimitation in the Soviet Union. However, in 1936 the entire Finnish population of the parishes of Valkeasaari, Lempaala, Vuole and Miikkulainen along the Finnish border was deported to Siberia and Central Asia, and replaced by a Russian-speaking population.

=== World War II ===
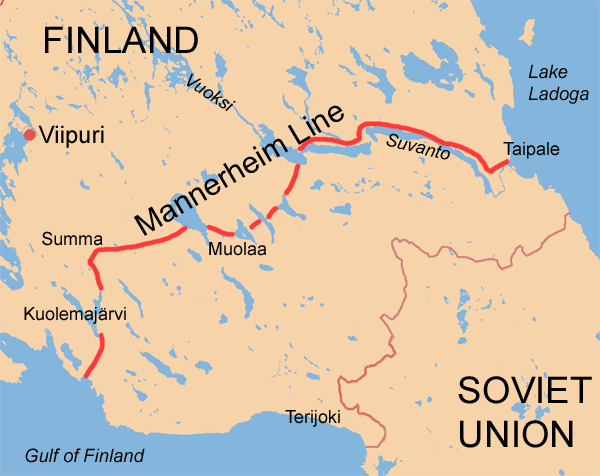
Mannerheim Line of the Winter War

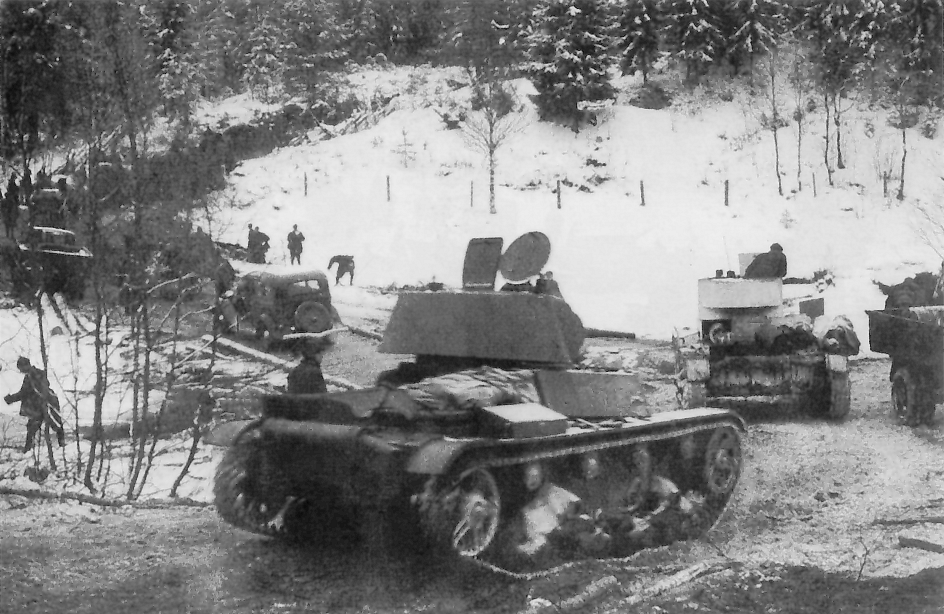
December 1939. Soviet tanks advancing

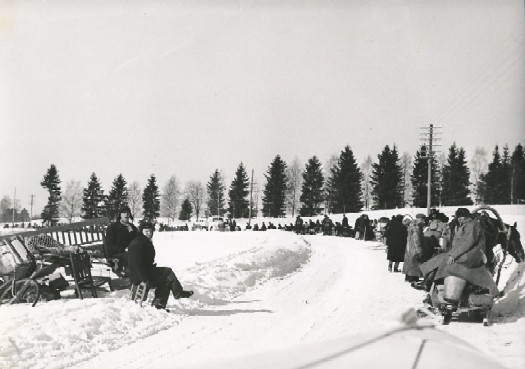
December 1939. Karelian evacuees from Muolaa municipality on their way to West-Finland

A number of defensive lines crossed the isthmus during the Soviet-Finnish hostilities in World War II, such as Mannerheim Line, VKT-line, VT-line, Main line (Finnish) and KaUR (Soviet), and fronts moved back and forth over it.

In November 1939, the Soviet Union staged the Shelling of Mainila and invaded Finland in what became known as the Winter War, which took a disproportionally heavy death toll on the Red Army. Only in February 1940 did the Soviet forces manage to penetrate the Mannerheim Line across the isthmus, the strength of which is often exaggerated. Finland ceded the Karelian Isthmus and Ladoga Karelia to the Soviet Union in the Peace of Moscow of 12 March. According to the protocol appended to the Moscow Peace Treaty, the fighting was ended at noon (Leningrad time) on 13 March and by 26 March the Finnish troops had been completely withdrawn. The entire Karelian population of the ceded areas of about 422 thousand people was evacuated to other parts of Finland (see Evacuation of Finnish Karelia). On 31 March most of the ceded territories were incorporated into Karelo-Finnish SSR by a decision of the Supreme Council of the Soviet Union (in the Karelian Isthmus the districts of Jääski, Kexholm and Vyborg). The districts of Kanneljärvi, Koivisto and Rautu as well as the town of Terijoki were, however, included into Leningrad Oblast.

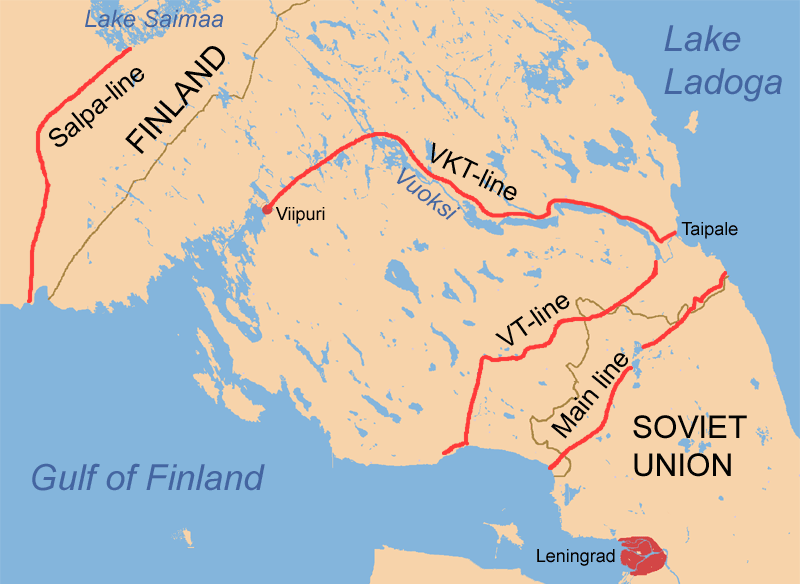
Finnish defensive lines of the Continuation War

In 1941, during World War II, Germany invaded the Soviet Union in Operation Barbarossa. A few days later was the beginning of the Continuation War as it is known in Finland. (It is considered to be a front of the Great Patriotic War in the Soviet Union and Russia.) Finland initially regained the lost territory, reaching the Russian side of the border of 1939 in what was seen by the Russians as indirectly contributing to the Siege of Leningrad (see Finnish reconquest of the Karelian Isthmus (1941)). Some 260,000 Karelian evacuees returned home.

On 9 June 1944, strong Soviet forces opened the Vyborg Offensive and pushed the front from the pre-1939 border to Vyborg in ten days. The returned Karelians were evacuated to Finland again. In the Battle of Tali-Ihantala, 25 June–9 July, the Finns concentrated their military strength and brought the offensive to a halt at the River Vuoksi, in the northwesternmost part of the isthmus, at the closest point only 40 kilometres from the border of 1940. The Moscow Armistice ending the war was signed on 19 September 1944. The entire isthmus became Soviet, although most of it had never been captured by the Soviets in battles. This time the ceded territories of the Karelian Isthmus (including the districts of Jääski, Kexholm and Vyborg) were incorporated into Leningrad Oblast (unlike Ladoga Karelia, which remained within the Karelo-Finnish SSR). The border of the Moscow Peace Treaty (1940) was recognized by Finland again in the Peace of Paris, 1947.

=== After the war ===
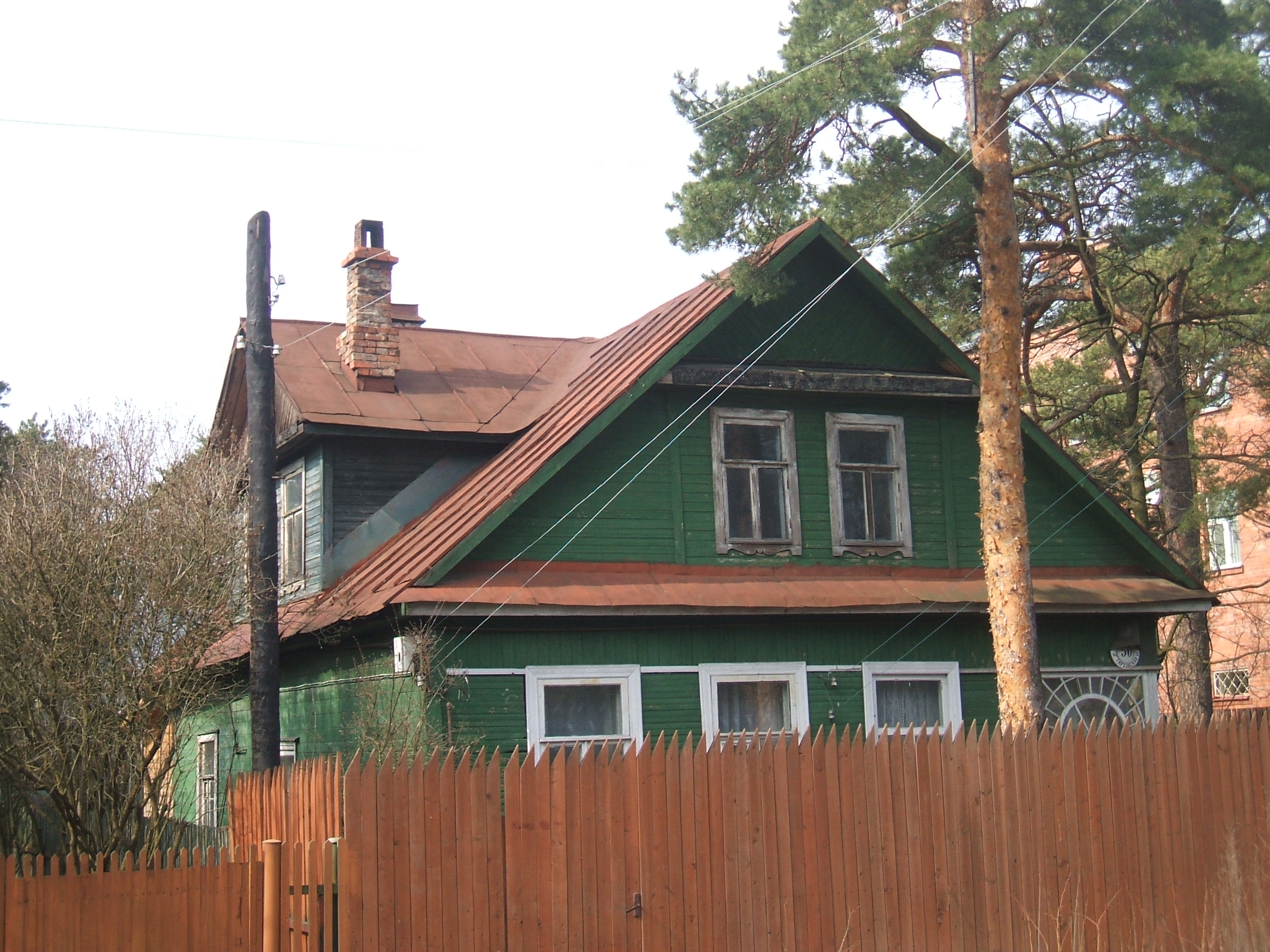
Sestroretsk

As a result of the war, the population of the Karelian Isthmus was almost completely replaced. After the war the isthmus was included in the Leningrad Oblast and people from other parts of the Soviet Union, mostly Russians, were settled there. The vast majority of the old Finnish toponyms in the conquered territories were renamed to invented Russian ones by the government around 1948. The Finnish toponyms of the territories included within Karelo-Finnish SSR and of the southern part of the isthmus (albeit assimilated) mostly remained. A lot of youth summer camps were built all over the isthmus during the time of the Soviet Union. Some of them still exist.

== Transport ==
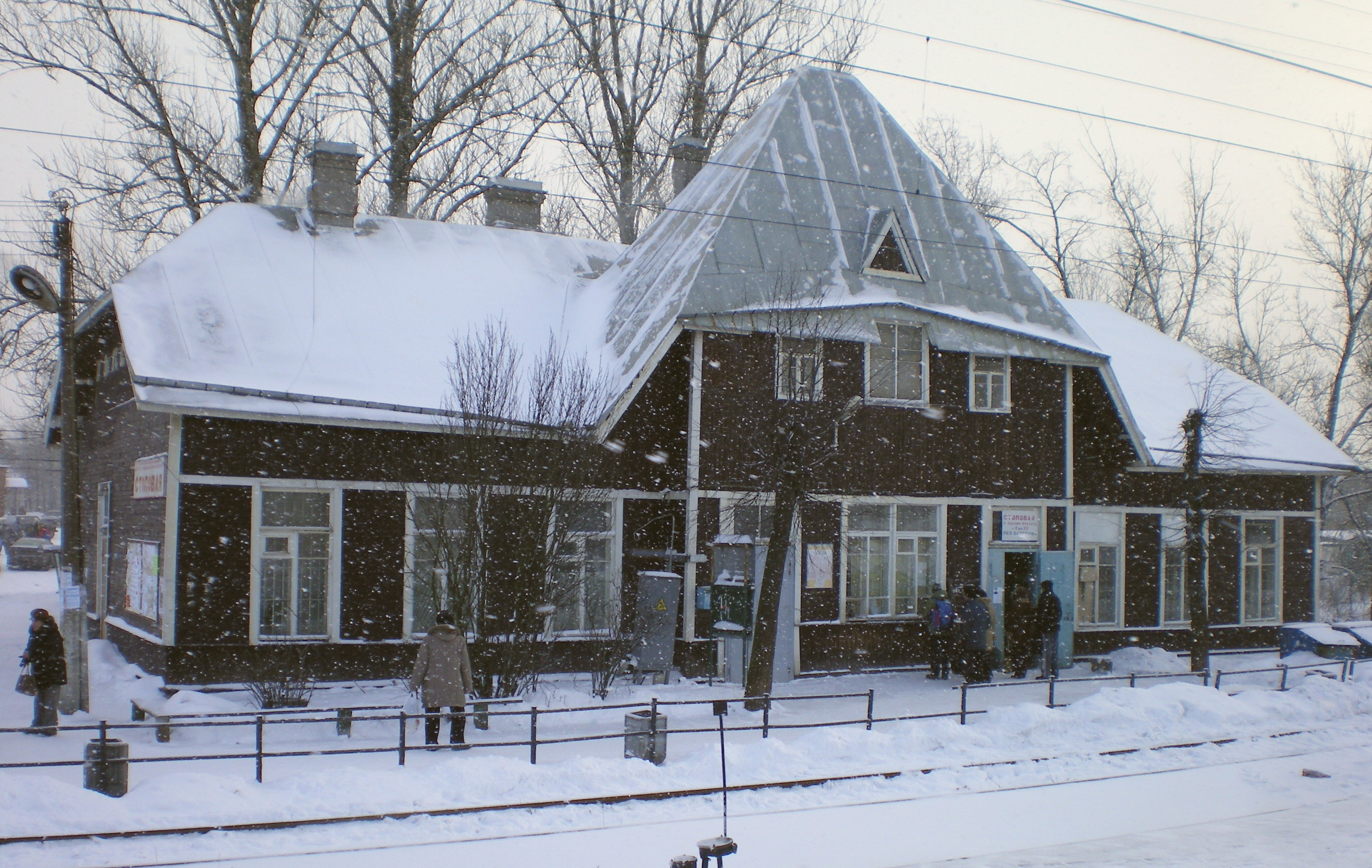
Toksovo railway station before renovation in 2008

The western part of the Karelian Isthmus is an important transport corridor linking Scandinavia and Central Russia. Primorsk, terminus of the Baltic Pipeline System, which has recently become one of the most efficient Russian sea ports, is also located here.

The only motorway on the isthmus is the recently completed E18 "Scandinavia" (M10) going from Saint Petersburg through Vyborg and Vaalimaa.

Saimaa Canal (opened in 1856) is an important link connecting inland waterways of Finland with the Gulf of Finland.

The Karelian Isthmus is served by a number of railways; the trains arrive from Finlyandsky Rail Terminal and Ladozhsky Rail Terminal of Saint Petersburg:

- Saint Petersburg-Hiitola railroad
- eastern part of the Saint Petersburg-Riihimäki railroad
- Saint Petersburg – Sestroretsk – Beloostrov
- southern part of the Vyborg-Joensuu railroad
- Saint Petersburg – Vsevolozhsk – Ladozhskoye Ozero
- Saint Petersburg – Vsevolozhsk – Petrokrepost – Nevskaya Dubrovka
- Vyborg – Veschevo (earlier also through Zhitkovo to Michurinskoye)
- Kamennogorsk – Svetogorsk – Imatra
- Zelenogorsk – Primorsk – Sovetsky – Vyborg

Also on the Karelian isthmus are all lines of the Saint Petersburg metro.

== Industry ==
The pulp-and-paper, timber and woodworking industries (JSC Svetogorsk, pulp and paper mill in Svetogorsk, Vyborgsky Pulp and Paper Mill in Vyborg, Priozersky Furniture and Woodworking Industrial Complex and Priozersky Woodworking Factory in Priozersk, as well as other smaller enterprises all over the isthmus) are well developed in Vyborgsky and Priozersky Districts. The pulp and paper industry, however, affects the environment adversely. The predecessor of the Priozersk facilities, Priozersky Pulp and Paper Mill, a major polluter of Lake Ladoga constructed in 1931, was closed down in 1986. Northern and western parts of the isthmus are also an important reserve of granite (quarries in Kuznechnoye, as well as a number of others along the Vyborg-Hiitola railroad).

Vyborg Shipyard is one of the largest shipbuilding companies in Northwestern Russia. Roskar Battery Farm in Pervomayskoye is a leading producer of chicken and eggs.

In Vsevolozhsky District state-owned Morozov Plant is located, which is an important producer of paints, adhesives, abrasives and other substances. In Kuzmolovsky, Vsevolozhsky District, near the station Kapitolovo of the Saint Petersburg–Hiitola railroad, a facility of the Saint Petersburg nuclear enterprise Izotop is located, which specializes in transportation of nuclear materials and radioactive waste. Bogs of Vsevolozhsky District along the shores of Lake Ladoga and the Neva River were major sources of peat for fuel. Now it is extracted in smaller quantities, mostly for agricultural purposes. The district is also an important supplier of sand. A plant of Ford Motor Company producing Ford Focus cars was opened in Vsevolozhsk in 2002.

== Military ==
The Karelian Isthmus is included within Leningrad Military District of the Armed Forces of the Russian Federation. The isthmus hosts airfields in Levashovo, Pribylovo and Gromovo. Other airfields in Veshchevo and Kasimovo (Vartemyagi) have been abandoned. In the northern part of Vsevolozhsky District, to the south of the old Finnish border, Karelian Fortified Region (KaUR) is located, which was reconstructed as late as in the 1960s, but now is abandoned as well. There is Bobochinsky tank range (195.975 km², founded in 1913) between Kamenka and Kirillovskoye and a number of military facilities in Vsevolozhsky District in the lowlands between Lake Ladoga and Saint Petersburg-Hiitola railroad, including Rzhevsky artillery range (founded in 1879), a huge area, 740 km^{2} (286 sq mi), encircled by the Road of Life, the roads Rzhevka – Novoye Devyatkino and Novoye Devyatkino – Matoksa and the coast of Lake Ladoga (available to visitors since 2003). In 2006 a Voronezh early warning radar was built in Lekhtusi, Vsevolozhsky District. The port of Vysotsk is a base of the Baltic Fleet. 138th Guards Motor Rifle Brigade is located in Kamenka, and in the 56th District Training Centre in Sertolovo.

== Population ==
The population of the Karelian isthmus today is slightly less than 3.1 million inhabitants. Of these, about 2.4 million live in St. Petersburg and a little less than 700 thousand in the Leningrad region. The population is growing solely due to migration, as the mortality rate is much higher than the birth rate, but the migration attractiveness of St. Petersburg and the surrounding areas of the Leningrad region is very high. Thus, about 40% of the population of St. Petersburg and about 30% of the population of the Leningrad region live on the Karelian isthmus. There is strong growth in population in all the districts of the Karelian isthmus in addition to the Vyborg district and Priozersk district.

== Notable people from the isthmus ==
=== Finnish period ===
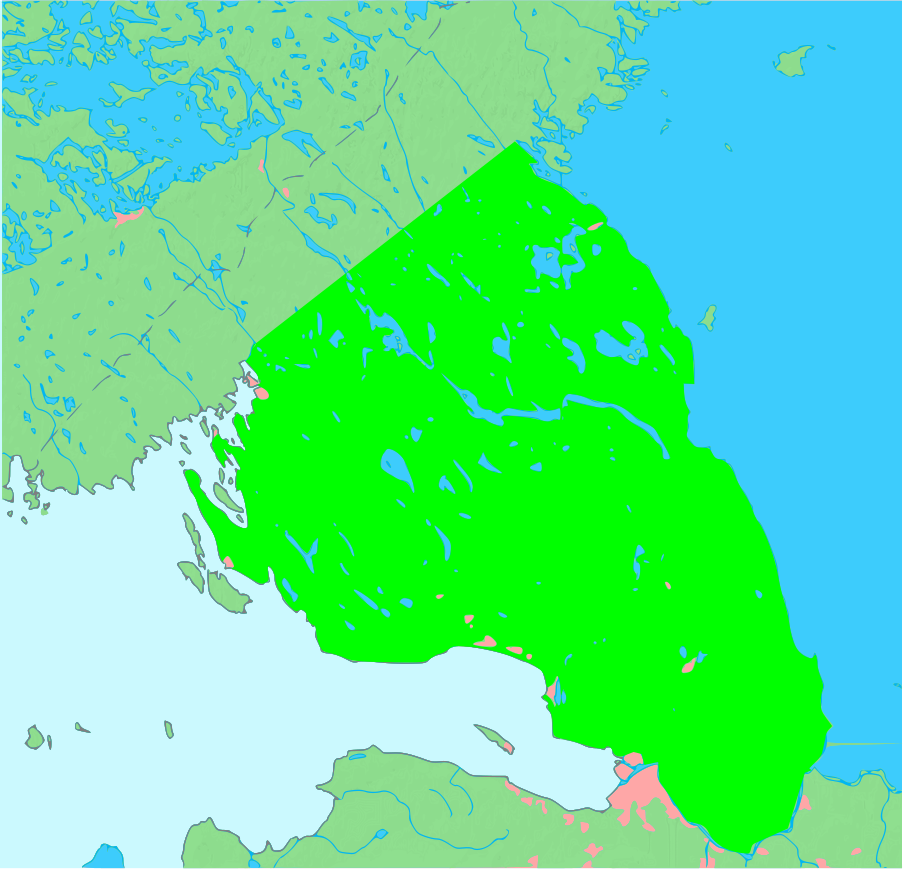
- Martti Ahtisaari, Finnish president, and recipient of the 2008 Nobel Peace Prize
- Georg Elfvengren, Finnish military commander
- Gustav Hägglund, Finnish military commander
- Max Jakobson, Finnish diplomat
- Gustaf Komppa, Finnish chemist
- Juho Niukkanen, Finnish politician
- Karl Lennart Oesch, Finnish military commander
- Larin Paraske, Finnish oral poet
- Edith Södergran, Swedish-speaking Finnish poet.
- Lauri Törni, born in Viipuri, Törni was a soldier and winner of the Mannerheim Cross during the Continuation War, who later served with the German and American armies.
- Uno Ullberg, Finnish architect
- Johannes Virolainen, Finnish politician
- Artturi Ilmari Virtanen, Finnish chemist, and recipient of the 1945 Nobel Prize in Chemistry

=== Soviet and post soviet period ===
- Elena Pogrebizhskaya
- Ilia Shtokalov
- Nastasya Samburskaya
- Lyubov Kozyreva (cross-country skier)
- Elena Kondulainen
