= Pribylovo, Leningrad Oblast =

Human settlement in Vyborgsky District, Leningrad Oblast, Russia

Coordinates: 60°26′N 28°40′E

Pribylovo (Russian: Прибылово; Finnish: Makslahti) is a rural locality (a settlement) under the administrative jurisdiction of Primorskoye Settlement Municipal Formation in Vyborgsky District of Leningrad Oblast, Russia, located on the Karelian Isthmus.

== History ==
An old Karelian settlement, it first appeared on the maps in the late 17th century as Maxlax (Makslahti). It consisted of several parts as Karelians traditionally tend to settle individually and most of the settlements were little hamlets or a group of adjacent hamlets. The settlement eventually encompassed four different areas as the neighboring hamlets (Makslahti, Kurkela, Peusa and Lähteenmaki) were merged in the second half of the 19th century. At the end of the 19th century, a brick yard, which later grew into a ceramic factory, was opened here. Until 1939, local economy was growing, with a bakery, a sawmill, and a fishing yard in operation.

After the 1939-1940 Winter War between Finland and the Soviet Union, the territories were ceded to the Soviets and the local population almost entirely migrated to Finland. To repopulate the area, migrants from Kostroma, Yaroslavl and Vologda regions of Russia were brought here. The settlement was given its current name after one of the Soviet soldiers that have fought on the Karelian Isthmus. Pribylovo's layout and look underwent significant changes. As Russians tend to settle in larger groups putting their houses next to each other, many outlying houses were grouped in the center. Some of the houses for the newcomers were moved from the nearby islands.

Until late 1988, Pribylovo remained a small rustic settlement of about 150 households on the outskirts of the Karelian Isthmus. After 1988, as the area was open for public access to all Russian citizens, Pribylovo had another surge of newcomers as people from St. Peterlburg were looking to acquire plots of land on the Karelian Isthmus. Many new plots of land were allocated for building of summer cottages.

== Transportation ==
The settlement hosts Bor railway station on the Primorsk–Vyborg line. Pribylovo (air base) is nearby.
