= Vuoksi =

River in the Karelian Isthmus

Vuoksi (Vuoksa)
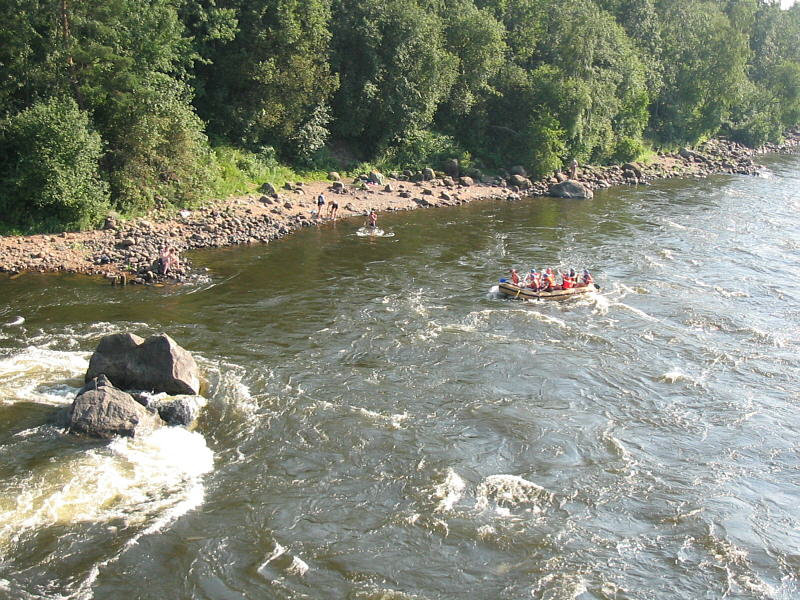

Location
- Countries: Finland; Russia

Physical characteristics
- Source: Lake Saimaa
  - coordinates: 61°13′00″N 28°47′22″E
  - elevation: 74 m (243 ft)
- Mouth: Lake Ladoga
  - coordinates: 61.0452°N 30.1856°E
- Length: 162 km (101 mi)
- Basin size: 68,700 km^{2} (26,500 sq mi)
- Discharge
  - average: 540 m^{3}/s (19,000 cu ft/s)

Basin features
- Progression: Lake Ladoga→ Neva→ Gulf of Finland

The Vuoksi (Russian: Вуокса, historically: "Uzerva"; Finnish: Vuoksi; Swedish: Vuoksen) is a river running through the northernmost part of the Karelian Isthmus from Lake Saimaa in southeastern Finland to Lake Ladoga in northwestern Russia. The river enters Lake Ladoga in three branches, an older main northern branch at Priozersk (Käkisalmi), a smaller branch a few kilometers to the north of it, and a new southern branch entering 50 kilometers (31 mi) further southeast as Burnaya River (Finnish: Taipaleenjoki), which has become the main stream in terms of water discharge. Since 1857, the old northern distributaries drain only the lower reaches of the Vuoksi basin and are not fed by Lake Saimaa. The northern and southern branches actually belong to two separate river systems, which at times get isolated from each other in dry seasons.

The descent between Lake Saimaa and Lake Ladoga is 69 meters (226 ft). The entire run of the river is 162 kilometers (101 mi) via the Priozersk branch, or 150 kilometers (93 mi) via the Taipale (Burnaya) branch. It has a drainage basin of 68,700 square kilometres (26,500 sq mi). For most of its length, the river broadens out to a series of lakes bound together by shorter riverlike connections. One of these lakes, Uusijärvi close to Priozersk, was renamed 'Vuoksa Lake in the Soviet Union.

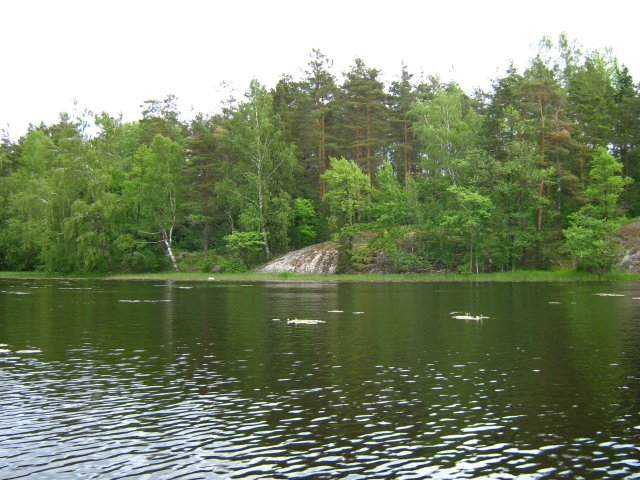
The Vuoksi near Melnikovo

The Vuoksi connects Lake Ladoga with central Finland, and was once an important route for trade and communication. A western branch, which disappeared due to ongoing land uplift, was an alternative route for the Karelians to reach the Gulf of Finland when the Neva River was blocked by enemies. Now the Saimaa Canal bypasses the Vuoksi and enters the Gulf of Finland in the Bay of Vyborg near the medieval city of Vyborg.

During both the Winter and Continuation Wars the river Vuoksi was a major Finnish defensive line against the Soviet advance. The Mannerheim Line and VKT-line were located along the northern shore of its southern armlet.

From the Industrial Revolution, power generated from Vuoksi's rapids made the Vuoksi region Finland's industrial center in the late 19th century. Since the Winter War (1940), the Karelian Isthmus has belonged to Russia and only 13 kilometers (8.1 mi) of the river's length remains in Finland. The major power stations at Tainionkoski and Imatra are on the Finnish side in the city of Imatra.

The river's surroundings, including the Korela Fortress (formerly: Käkisalmi), is a popular resort for Saint Petersburg's residents.

The river is famous for its rapids, for instance Imatrankoski in Imatra and rapid in the village of Losevo (Kiviniemi). The rapid junction of the Vuoksi and Suvanto/Lake Sukhodolskoye at Losevo is a popular area for kayak, canoe and catamaran competitions.

A project is currently being discussed in Russia to destroy the rapids at Losevo and turn the River Burnaya, Lake Sukhodolskoye and lower portions of Vuoksi into a navigable canal, which would connect Lake Ladoga to the Gulf of Finland and allow oil tankers to bypass River Neva and the city of Saint Petersburg.

== Geological history ==
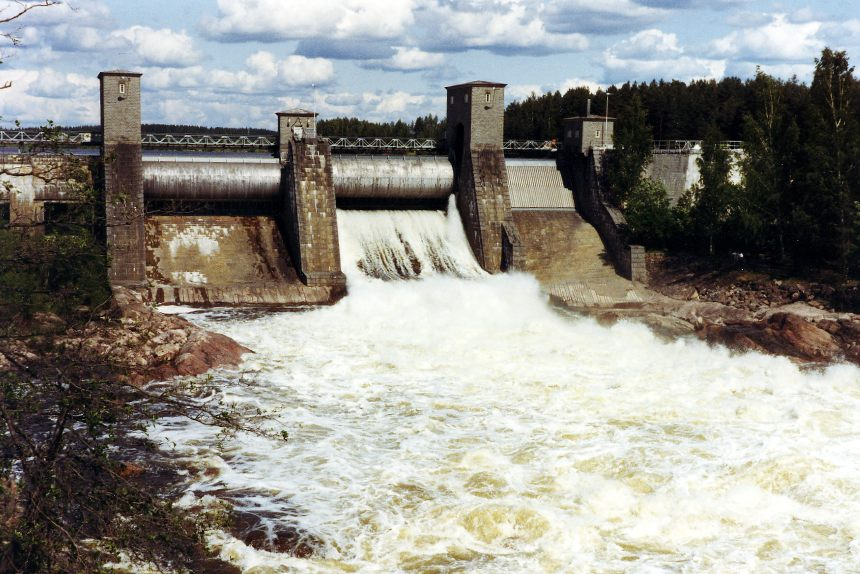
Dam at Imatrankoski, Imatra, Finland

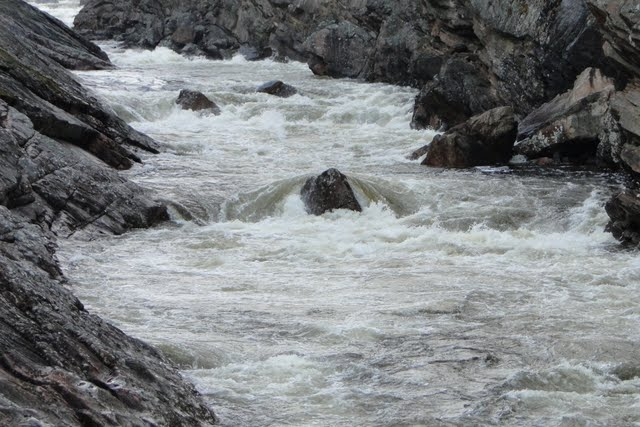
The Vuoksi river near Imatra

Around 5,000 BP the waters of the Saimaa Lake penetrated Salpausselkä, forming the river emptying into Lake Ladoga in its northwestern corner and raising the level of the latter by 1 to 2 meters (3.3 to 6.6 ft). Lake Ladoga transgressed, flooding lowland lakes and the Vuoksi, and connected with the Baltic Sea at Heinjoki, to the east of present-day Vyborg. Ladoga's level gradually sank and the River Neva, originating around 3100–2400 BP, drained its waters into the Gulf of Finland; but the Vuoksi still had a significant direct outflow connection to the Bay of Vyborg, possibly as late as in the 16th or 17th century AD. The connection disappeared due to ongoing land uplift.

In 1818, a canal was dug to drain spring flood waters from Lake Suvanto (now Lake Sukhodolskoye, a 40 kilometers (25 mi) long narrow lake in the eastern part of the Karelian Isthmus) into Lake Ladoga; the canal unexpectedly eroded and turned into Taipaleenjoki (now Burnaya River). The Taipaleenjoki started draining Suvanto and decreased its level by 7 meters (23 ft). Originally Lake Suvanto flowed into the Vuoksi through a waterway at Kiviniemi (now Losevo), but as a result of the change, the waterway dried out. In 1857 a channel was dug there, but the stream reversed direction, creating rapids and rendering navigation at Kiviniemi impossible. Since 1857 Suvanto and Taipaleenjoki have constituted the southern branch of the Vuoksi, which has decreased the level of the original northern branch emptying into Ladoga near Kexholm (now Priozersk) by 4 meters (13 ft) and has become the main stream.
