= Burnaya =

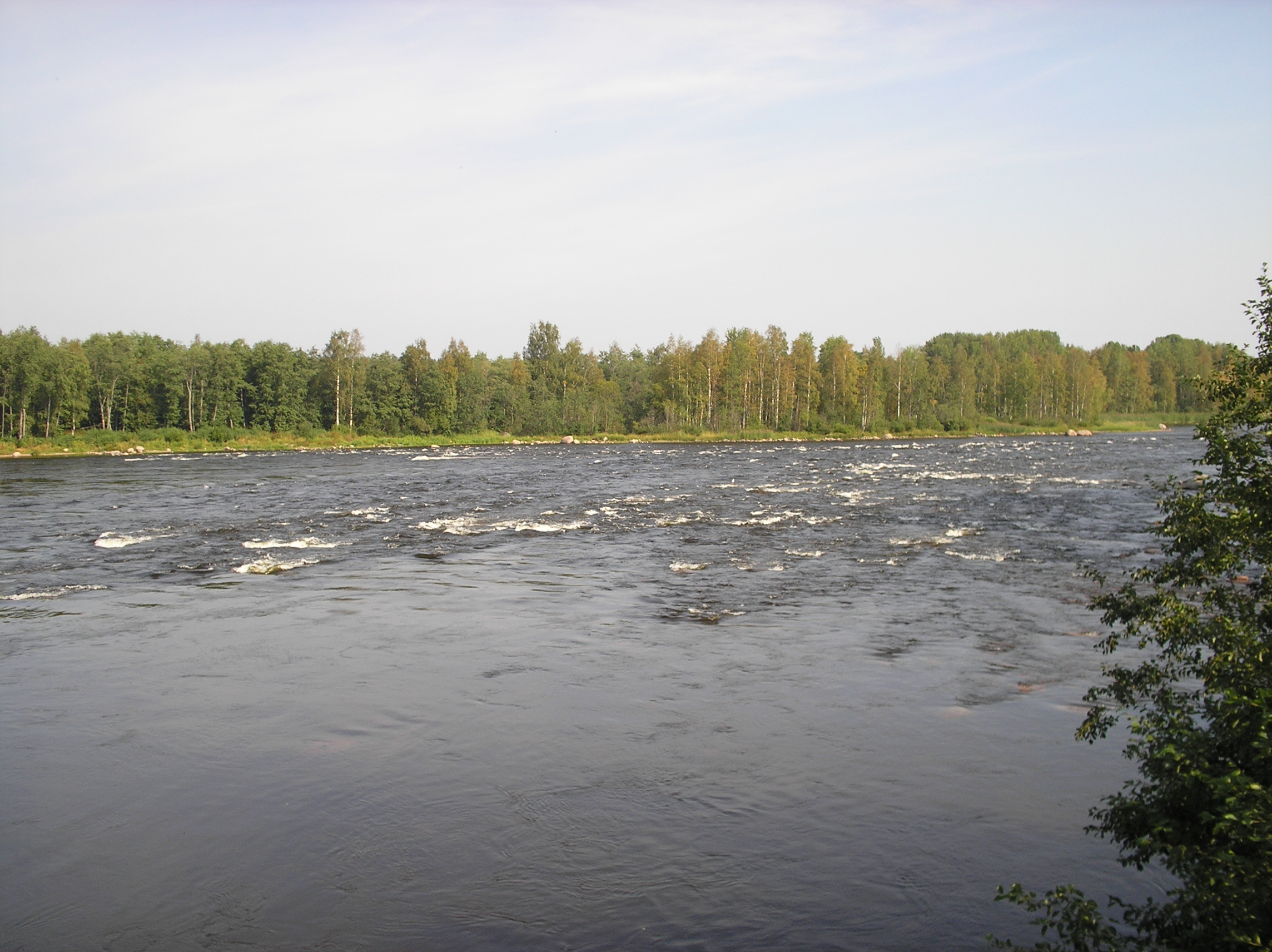

Location
- Country: Russia

Physical characteristics
- Source: Lake Sukhodolskoye
- Mouth: Lake Ladoga
  - coordinates: 60.6245°N 30.5056°E

Basin features
- Progression: Lake Ladoga→ Neva→ Gulf of Finland

The Burnaya (Russian: Бурная, Finnish: Taipaleenjoki) is a young rapid river in Priozersky District of Leningrad Oblast, Russia, on the Karelian Isthmus, which emerged in 1818. It flows from Lake Sukhodolskoye to Lake Ladoga and is a part of Vuoksi River drainage basin. Before the Winter War and Continuation War it was located in Finland, known under the name Taipaleenjoki.

Originally waters of Lake Suvanto (Lake Sukhodolskoye) quietly flowed into the Vuoksi through a waterway at Kiviniemi. However, in 1818 a channel that had been dug to drain spring flood waters from Suvanto into Lake Ladoga unexpectedly turned into the Taipaleenjoki, which started draining Suvanto and decreased its level by 7 metres (23 ft). The Kiviniemi waterway dried out. In 1857 the channel was dug there, but the stream reversed direction, revealed rapids and rendered navigation at Kiviniemi impossible. Since 1857 Lake Sukhodolskoye and the Burnaya River have constituted the southern armlet of Vuoksi River, which has decreased the level of the original northern armlet flowing through Priozersk by 4 metres (13 ft).
