= Eeva Turunen =

Finnish politician (1933–2015)

Eeva Turunen (née Viljanen; 22 June 1933 – 20 December 2015) was a Finnish secondary school teacher and politician. She was a member of the Parliament of Finland from 1983 to 1995, representing the National Coalition Party. Born in Valkjärvi on 22 June 1933, she died in Joensuu in 2015.
