= Lake Yastrebinoye =

Lake in Leningrad, Russia

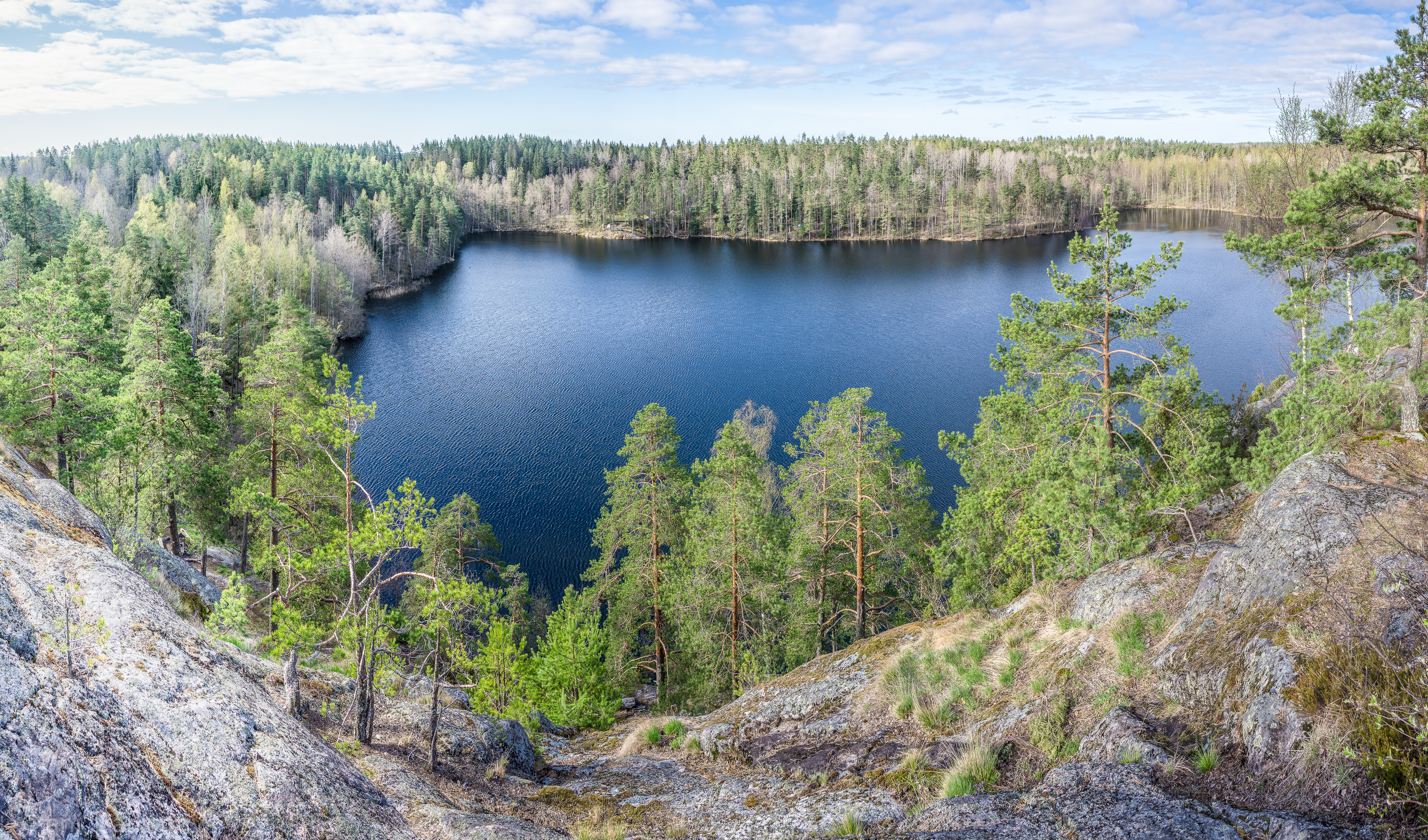

- Location within Russia
- Location: Karelian Isthmus, Leningrad Oblast
- Coordinates: 61.16°N 29.70°E
- Basin countries: Russia

Lake Yastrebinoye (Russian: Ястреби́ное о́зеро, IPA: [ˈozʲɪrə jɪstrʲɪˈbʲinəjə], lit. Hawk Lake; Finnish: Haukkajärvi, lit. Hawk Lake) is a 2 km long lake in Priozersky District of Leningrad Oblast, close to the border with the Republic of Karelia, in the northernmost part of the Karelian Isthmus, 10 km from the railway station Kuznechnoye.
