= Pribylovo (air base) =

Airbase of the Russian Aerospace Forces near Pribylovo, Leningrad Oblast, Russia

Pribylovo Kluchevoye/Pribylovo
- Ключевое/Прибылово
- Pribylovo, Leningrad Oblast in Russia
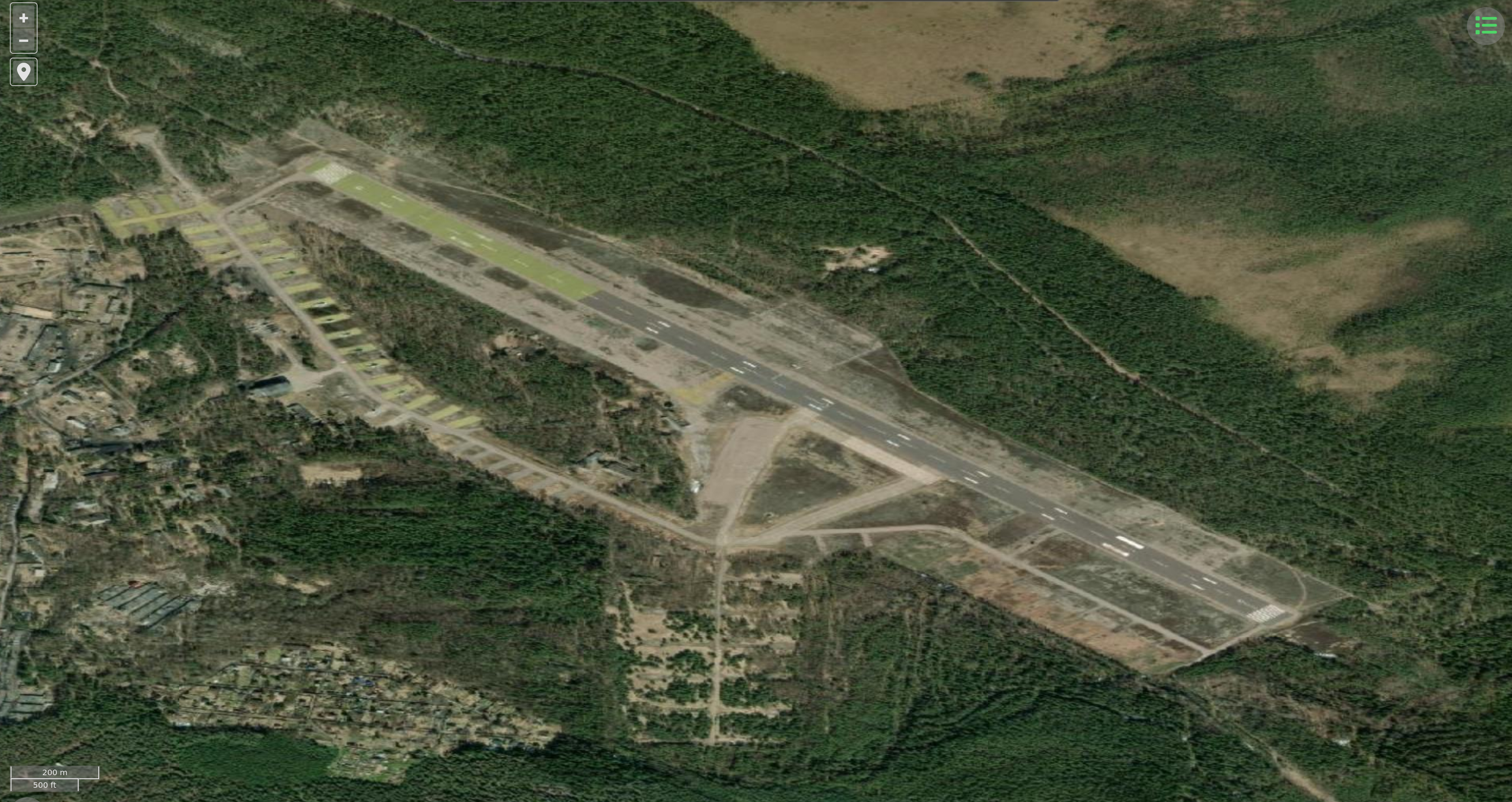
- Satellite imagery of Pribylovo air base

Site information
- Type: Air Base
- Owner: Ministry of Defence
- Operator: Russian Aerospace Forces
- Controlled by: 6th Air and Air Defence Forces Army

Location
- Shown within Leningrad Oblast Pribylovo (Russia)
- Coordinates: 60°27′33″N 28°44′42″E

Site history
- In use: present

Airfield information
- Elevation: 40 metres (131 ft) AMSL
Runways
Direction	Length and surface
13/31	1,970 metres (6,463 ft) Concrete

Pribylovo is an airbase of the Russian Aerospace Forces located near Pribylovo, Leningrad Oblast, Russia.

The base is home to the 549th Independent Helicopter Regiment.

== See also ==
- List of military airbases in Russia
