= David Suvanto =

Swedish ice hockey player

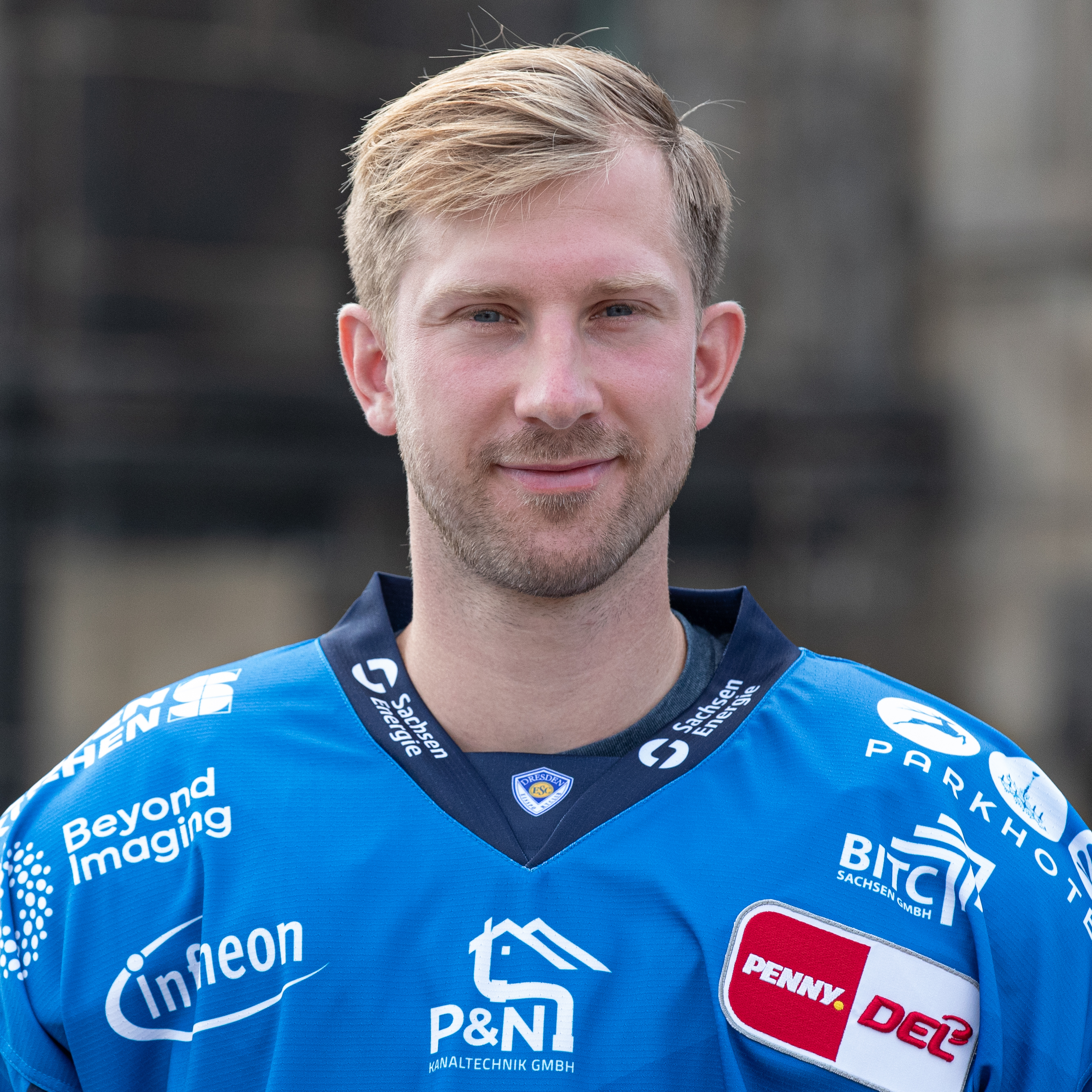
- Suvanto in 2025
- Born: August 18, 1994 (age 31) Sweden
- Height: 6 ft 1 in (185 cm)
- Weight: 152 lb (69 kg; 10 st 12 lb)
- Position: Left wing
- Shoots: Left
- Germany team Former teams: Löwen Frankfurt; LeksandsIF
- NHL draft: Undrafted
- Playing career: 2014–present

David Suvanto (born August 18, 1994) is a Swedish ice hockey player. He is currently playing with Löwen Frankfurt of the DEL2 (Germany).

Suvanto made his Swedish Hockey League debut playing with Leksands IF during the 2013–14 SHL season.
