= Veshchevo =

Rural locality in Vyborgsky, Leningrad Oblast, Russia

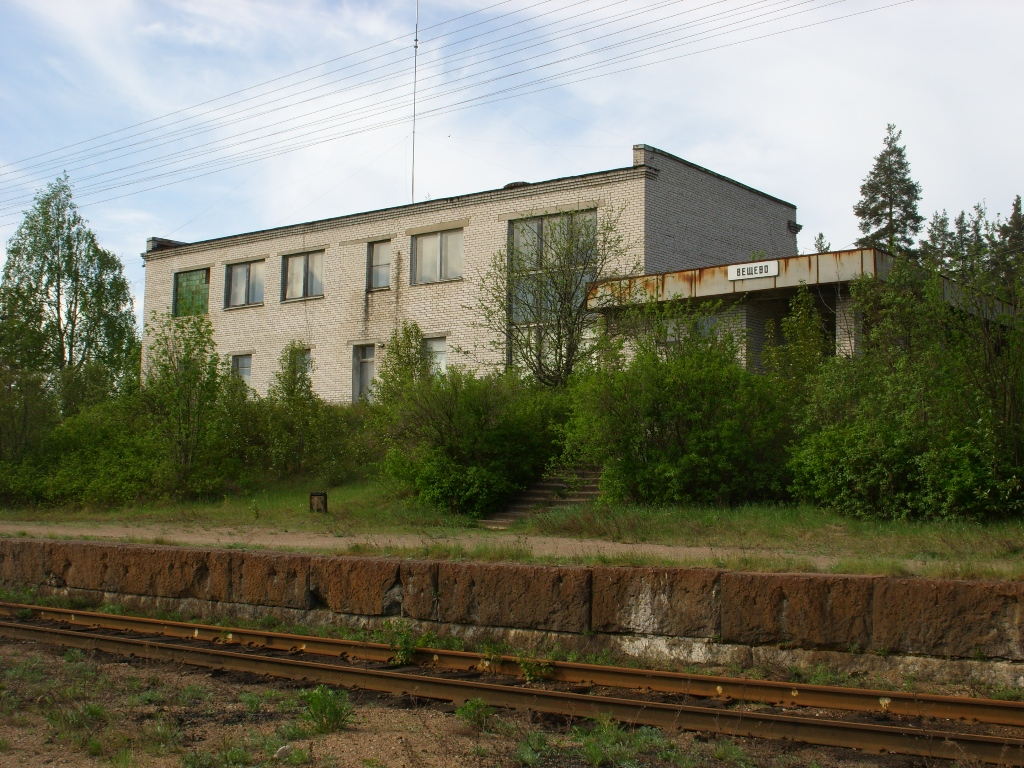
- Veshchevo railway station
- IATA: none; ICAO: none

Summary
- Airport type: Military
- Operator: Russian Navy
- Elevation AMSL: 154 ft (47 m)
- Coordinates: 60°40′24″N 029°10′0″E
- Interactive map of Veshchevo

Runways
Direction	Length		Surface
Direction	ft	m	Surface
	8,202	2,500	Concrete

Veshchevo (Russian: Вещево; Finnish: Heinjoki) is a rural locality on Karelian Isthmus, in Vyborgsky District of Leningrad Oblast, and a station of the Vyborg–Zhitkovo railroad. The railway track between Veshchevo and Zhitkovo was, however, dismantled in 2001.

Until the Winter War and the Continuation War between Finland and the Soviet Union, it had been the administrative center of the Heinjoki municipality of the Viipuri province of Finland. Established in 1869, the Heinjoki municipality was ceded to the Soviet Union in 1944.

== Veshchevo Air Base ==
The locality hosts the Veshchevo Air Base (also known as Vyborg East), located 23 km to the east of Vyborg. The 66 OMSHAP (66th Independent Naval Shturmovik Aviation Regiment) was based here with 45 Sukhoi Su-17M2 aircraft in the early 1990s. On March 8, 1988, Aeroflot Flight 3739, a hijacked Tupolev Tu-154, which was parking at this airfield was captured by Soviet security forces. The field is now abandoned.
