= Lake Sukhodolskoye =

Lake in Leningrad, Russia

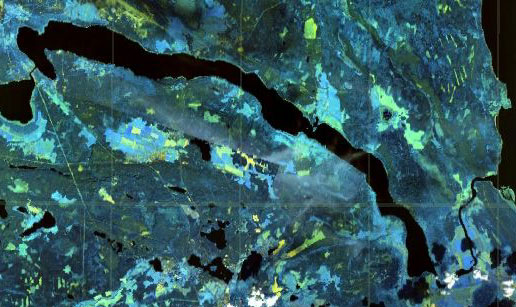

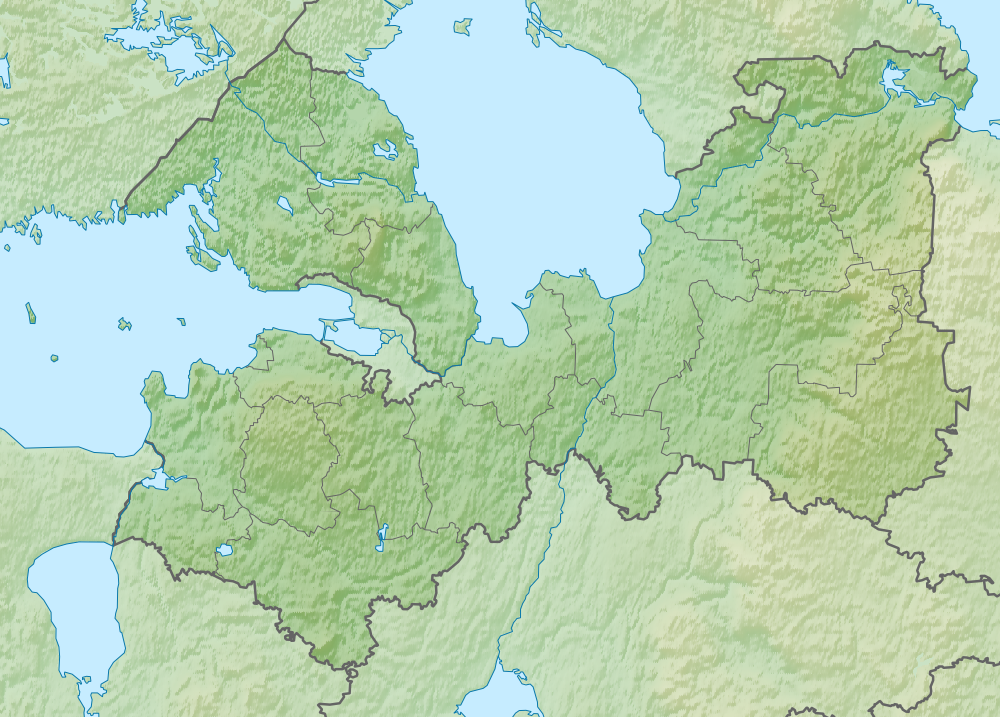
- Location within Leningrad Oblast
- Location: Priozersky District, Leningrad Oblast
- Coordinates: 60°40′29″N 30°14′42″E
- Primary outflows: Burnaya River
- Basin countries: Russia
- Max. length: 40 km (25 mi)

Lake Sukhodolskoye (Russian: Суходольское озеро; Finnish: Suvanto-järvi) is a narrow 40 km long lake on the Karelian Isthmus located in Priozersky District of Leningrad Oblast, Russia. It is a part of the Vuoksi River basin, constituting its southern armlet, and drained by Burnaya River.

Originally waters of the lake flowed into the Vuoksi through a waterway at Kiviniemi. However, in 1818 the channel that had been dug to drain spring flood waters from the lake into Lake Ladoga unexpectedly turned into Taipaleenjoki (Burnaya River), which started draining the lake itself and decreased its level by 7 m. The Kiviniemi waterway dried out. In 1857 a channel was dug there, but the stream reversed direction, revealed rapids and rendered navigation at Kiviniemi impossible. Since 1857 Lake Sukhodolskoye and Burnaya River have constituted the southern armlet of Vuoksi River, which has decreased the level of the original northern armlet flowing through Priozersk by 4 m.

== Archaeology ==
In the late 19th and early 20th centuries, stray finds of Stone Age artifacts were found on the shores of the lake. Further exploration revealed 190 finds from the shores of the lake and another fifty from the exposed bottom of the lake, including stone tools such as axes and adzes. Due to the large number of stone tools found in one place, it is believed that they were deposited there deliberately, as seen at other Stone Age sites in northern Europe and Russia.
