= Losevo, Leningrad Oblast =

Rural locality in Priozersky District, Russia

Coordinates: 60.678°N 30.001°E

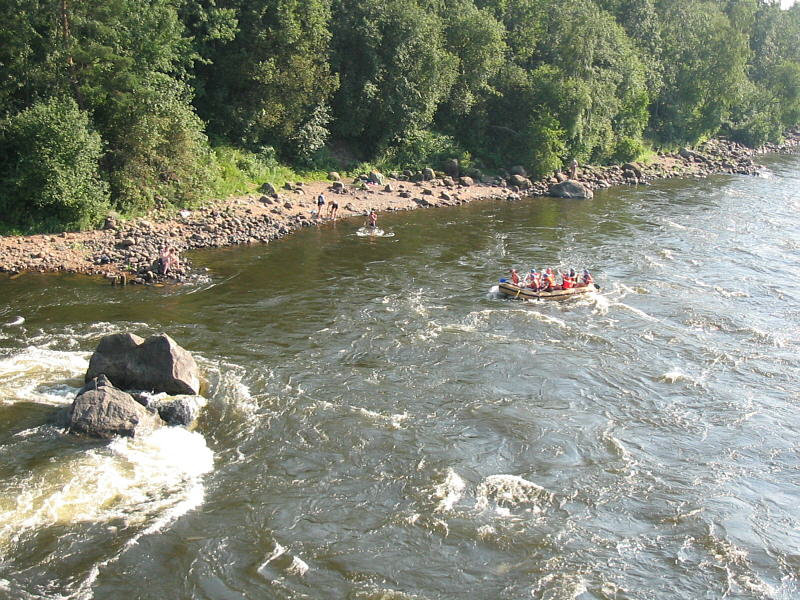
Whitewaters in Losevo

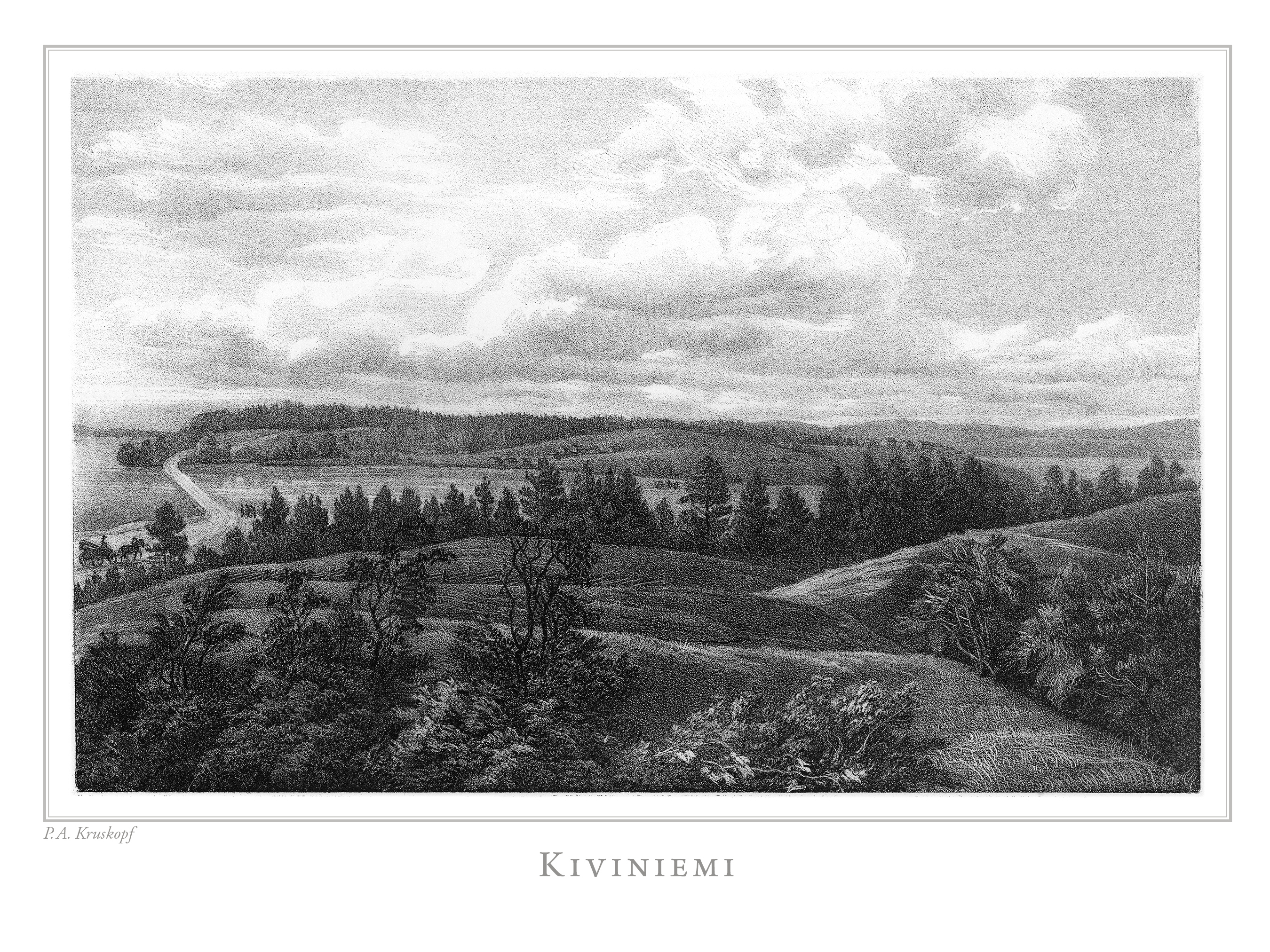
Illustration in Finland framstäldt i teckningar edited by Zacharias Topelius and published 1845-1852.

Losevo (Russian: Лосево; Finnish: Kiviniemi) is a rural locality (a station settlement) in Priozersky District, Leningrad Oblast, located at the junction of Vuoksi River and Lake Sukhodolskoye on Karelian Isthmus. It is a railway station of the Saint Petersburg–Khiytola railroad. Before the Winter War and Continuation War, it was a village of the Sakkola municipality of Finland known as Kiviniemi.

Originally waters of Lake Sukhodolskoye quietly flowed into Vuoksi, but in 1818, as Burnaya River had emerged and started draining Sukhodolskoye into Lake Ladoga, the level of the former decreased dramatically by 7 meters (23 ft) and the waterway connecting it to Vuoksi dried out. In 1857, the channel was dug, but the stream reversed direction, revealed rapids, and rendered navigation impossible. Since 1857 Lake Sukhodolskoye and Burnaya River have constituted the southern armlet of Vuoksi River, which has decreased the level of the original northern armlet by 4 meters (13 ft).

Before the construction of Saint Petersburg-Khiytola railroad, Kiviniemi was an important river port connected to Antrea (Kamennogorsk), Käkisalmi (Priozersk), and Taipale (Solovyovo). In 1917, the railroad was constructed, and a railway bridge passed over the rapids.
