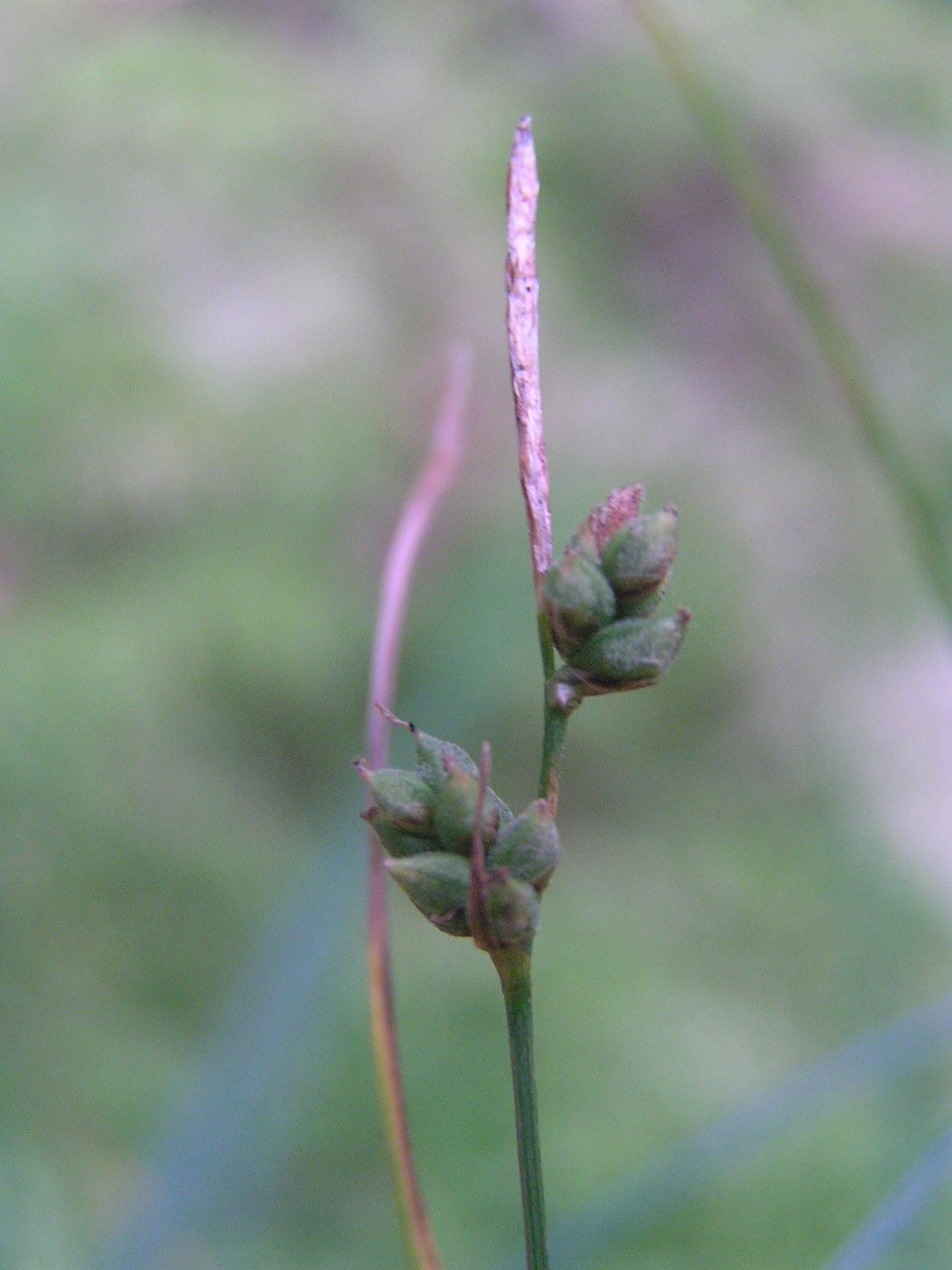

Scientific classification
- Kingdom: Plantae
- Clade: Tracheophytes
- Clade: Angiosperms
- Clade: Monocots
- Clade: Commelinids
- Order: Poales
- Family: Cyperaceae
- Genus: Carex
- Species: C. globularis

Binomial name
- Carex globularis L.

= Carex globularis =

Species of grass-like plant

Carex globularis is a perennial species of sedge in the family Cyperaceae native to damp forests and wetlands of Asia, Eastern Europe, and Scandinavia.
