= Veshevo Air Base =

Airfield in Leningrad Oblast, Russia

Veshchovo Airfield
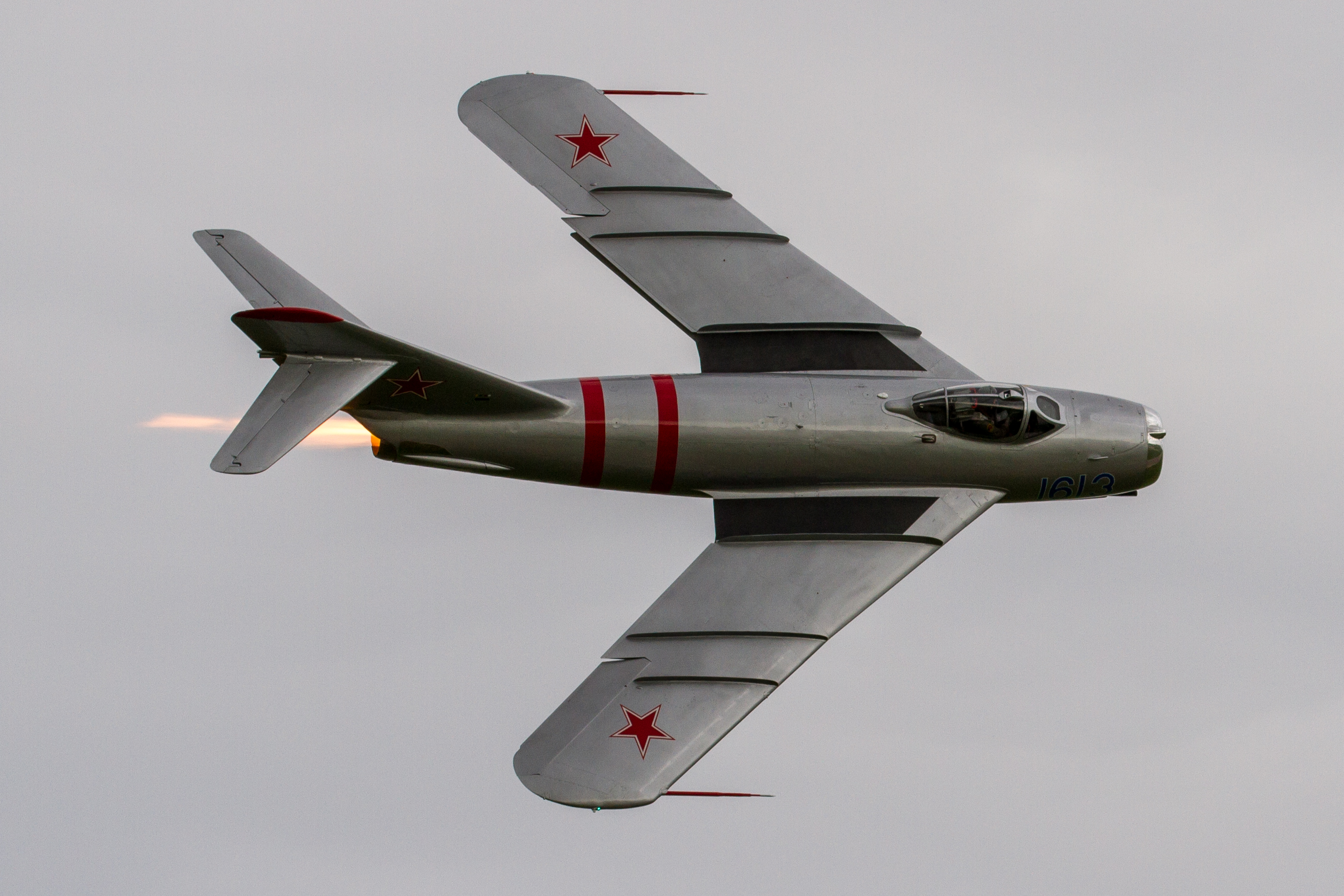
- MiG-17
- IATA: LED; ICAO: ULLI

Summary
- Airport type: Former Military Air Base
- Operator: Russian Navy
- Location: Veshchovo, Leningrad Oblast, Russia
- Elevation AMSL: 154 ft / 47 m
- Coordinates: 60°40′17″N 29°10′12″E

Map
- Location in Russia

Runways
Direction	Length		Surface
Direction	ft	m	Surface
15/33	8,202	2,500	Concrete

Veshchovo Airfield (also known as Veshevo Air Base) is a former military Air Base in village of Veshchovo, Leningrad Oblast, Russia.

== History ==
Veshchovo Airfield began in the 1950s, when it was built during the Cold War. Initially, it housed Soviet fighter jets, transitioning from Mikoyan-Gurevich MiG-17 (ASCC: Fresco) to Sukhoi Su-17M3 (ASCC: Fitter-H) aircraft. In December 1968, the 66th Independent Fighter-Bomber Aviation Regiment operated by the 76th Air Army was activated at the base until 1994, when it was disbanded. It gained attention in 1988 for alleged involvement in a UFO incident and a plane hijacking.

=== MiG-21UM Accident ===
During a training mission form Veshchsovo Air base, Mikoyan-Gurevich MiG-21UM (ASCC: Mongol-B) crashed due to engine failure at Kingisepp on 20 October 1982 in Leningrad Oblast, Russia. The crew ejected safely.

== Closure ==
Veshchovo Airfield was closed in the early 1990s after the collapse of the Soviet Union. The airfield was abandoned by the military in 1994, and it gradually fell into disrepair due to looting and neglect. Attempts to repurpose the site were unsuccessful, and it remains in a derelict state today.

== Units ==
The following units that were based here at some point:

- 66th Independent Fighter-Bomber Aviation Regiment equipped with MiG-17 from 1968-1974, MiG-21SMT from 1974-1976, Su-17M2 from 1976-1990, and Su-17M3 from 1989-1994.
