= Michurinskoye, Leningrad Oblast =

Settlement in Priozersky District, Russia

Coordinates: 60°34′N 29°52′E

Michurinskoye (Russian: Мичу́ринское; Finnish: Valkjärvi) is a settlement on Karelian Isthmus, in Priozersky District of Leningrad Oblast.

== History ==
Before the Winter War and Continuation War it was the administrative center of the Valkjärvi municipality of Finland.

== Notable people ==
- Eeva Turunen (born 1933), Finnish Member of Parliament from 1983-1995
