= Aftermath of the Winter War =

The aftermath of the Winter War covers the historical events and views following the Winter War between Finland and the Soviet Union from 30 November 1939 to 13 March 1940.

The short period between the Winter War and the Continuation War of 1941–1944, where hostilities between Finland and the Soviet Union resumed, is known as the Interim Peace.

== Post-war ==
=== Effects in Finland ===
The 105-day war had a profound and depressing effect in Finland. Useful international support was minimal, arrived late, and the German blockade prevented most armament shipments. The state of the Finnish Army on the Karelian Isthmus at the end of the war has been the subject of debate. Orders were already given to prepare a retreat to the next line of defence in the Taipale sector. Estimates of how long the enemy could have been held in these kinds of retreat-and-stand operations varied from a few days to a couple of months, most averaging around a few weeks. During the Interim Peace, Karelian local governments, parishes and provincial organizations established Karjalan Liitto, an interest group, in order to defend the rights and interests of Karelian evacuees and to find a solution for returning Karelia.

=== Soviet views ===
During the period between the war and the perestroika in late 1980s, Soviet historiography leaned solely on the Soviet foreign minister Vyacheslav Molotov's comments on the Winter War. In his radio speech of 29 November 1939, Molotov argued that the Soviet Union had been trying for two months to negotiate guarantees for the security for Leningrad. However, the Finns had taken a hostile stance in order to "please foreign imperialists". The Finns had undertaken military provocation and the Soviets could no longer honor nonaggression pacts. According to Molotov, Soviets did not want to occupy or annex Finland; the goal was purely to secure Leningrad.

Another source, later used widely in Soviet historiography, was the speech of Molotov to the Supreme Soviet on 29 March 1940. Molotov blamed western countries for instigating the war and argued that they had used Finland as a proxy to fight against the Soviet Union. The Allies had furthermore tried to persuade Sweden and Norway to join the conflict. The main "antagonists" in Soviet eyes were the United Kingdom and France, but also Sweden, the United States, and Italy, which had issued massive amounts of materials, money, and manpower to Finland. According to Molotov, the Soviet Union was merciful in peace terms, as the problem of Leningrad's security had been solved.

It has been speculated that Stalin had practically wiped out his intelligence apparatus during the purges, thus damaging the effectiveness of spies in Finland and other countries, as well as cowing operatives into telling Stalin what he wanted to hear. He therefore was not aware of the real situation in Finland and amongst the Allies. Soviet intelligence sources had reported on Allied plans to intervene in the war, but not on the actual unpreparedness of the Allies. Therefore, the Soviets felt forced to seek a premature end to the war before possible Allied intervention and declaration of war on the Soviet Union.

In 1948, Stalin wrote in Falsifiers of History that "there could hardly be any doubt that the leading circles of Finland were in league with the Hitlerites and that they wanted to turn Finland into a springboard for Hitler Germany's attack on the U.S.S.R." Regarding the beginning of the war, Stalin wrote, "In the war which the Finnish reactionaries started against the Soviet Union, Britain and France rendered the Finnish militarists every kind of assistance. The Anglo-French ruling circles kept inciting the Finnish Government to continue hostilities."

Nikita Khrushchev, who had been a party leader during the war, reminisced later on: "In our war against the Finns we had an opportunity to choose the time and the place. We outnumbered our enemy, and we had all the time in the world to prepare for our operation. Yet even in these most favorable conditions it was only after great difficulty and enormous losses that we were finally able to win. A victory at such a cost was actually a moral defeat. Our people never knew that we had suffered a moral defeat, of course, because they were never told the truth. All of us—and Stalin first and foremost—sensed in our victory a defeat by the Finns. It was a dangerous defeat because it encouraged our enemies' conviction that the Soviet Union was a colossus with feet of clay."

In 1994, the President of Russia, Boris Yeltsin, denounced the Winter War, conceding that it was a war of aggression.

=== Germany ===
The Winter War was a success for the Germans. Both the Red Army and the League of Nations were humiliated and furthermore, the Allied Supreme War Council had been revealed to be chaotic and powerless. However, the German policy of neutrality was not popular in the homeland and relations with Italy had also suffered badly. After the Peace of Moscow, the Germans did not hesitate to move to improve ties, and within two weeks, Finno-German relations were at the top of the agenda.

During the Interim Peace, the Finns gradually moved closer to Germany to fend off the perceived Soviet aggression and the Soviet interference into the Finnish domestic politics. Later Finland came to perceive the co-operation with Germany as a chance to reclaim areas ceded to the Soviet Union. Two days after the beginning of Operation Barbarossa, Soviet–Finnish hostilities resumed with start of the Continuation War.

=== Western Allies ===
The Winter War put in question the organisation and effectiveness of not only the Red Army, but also that of the Western Allies. The Supreme War Council did not manage its way through the situation, but revealed its total unsuitability to make effective war in either Britain or France. This failure led to the collapse of the Daladier government in France, and later, after the failure in the Norwegian Campaign, the fall of Chamberlain government in the United Kingdom.

=== Military consequences ===
The Supreme Military Soviet met in April 1940, sifted through the lessons of the Finnish campaign, and recommended reforms. The role of frontline political commissars was reduced and old-fashioned ranks and forms of discipline were reintroduced. Clothing, equipment and tactics for winter operations were improved. However, not all of these reforms had been completed when the Germans started Operation Barbarossa fourteen months later.

In the summer of 1940, the Soviet Union occupied the Baltic states of Estonia, Latvia, and Lithuania. Finland aimed to improve its defensive capabilities and conducted negotiations with Sweden regarding a military alliance, but negotiations ended once it became clear that both Germany and the Soviet Union opposed such an alliance. On 31 July 1940, German Chancellor Adolf Hitler gave the order to plan an assault on the Soviet Union, meaning that Germany had to reassess its position regarding Finland. Until then, Germany had rejected Finnish appeals to purchase arms, but with the prospect of an invasion of Russia, this policy was reversed, and in August the secret sale of weapons to Finland was permitted.

Karelian evacuees established an interest group, the Finnish Karelian League, to defend Karelian rights and interests, and to find a way to return ceded regions of Karelia to Finland. Finland wished to re-enter World War II mainly because of the Soviet invasion of Finland during the Winter War – which had taken place after Finland's reliance on the League of Nations and Nordic neutrality in order to avoid conflict had failed. Finland primarily aimed to reverse its territorial losses from the Moscow Peace Treaty and, depending on the success of the German invasion of the Soviet Union, to possibly expand its borders, especially into East Karelia. Some right-wing groups, such as the Academic Karelia Society, supported a Greater Finland ideology. The Continuation War began in June 1941, leading to Finnish participation in the siege of Leningrad as well as the Finnish occupation of East Karelia.

== Casualties of the war ==
During the four months of fighting, the Soviet Army suffered massive losses. One Red Army General, looking at a map of the territory just conquered, is said to have remarked: "We have won just about enough ground to bury our dead." The official Soviet figure, issued just after the war, listed 48,745 dead and 150,863 wounded.

According to Nikita Khrushchev, 1.5 million men were sent to Finland and one million of them were killed, while 1,000 aircraft, 2,300 tanks and armored cars and an enormous amount of other war materials were lost. Finland's losses were limited to 25,904 dead or missing and 43,557 wounded.

In 1990, professor Mikhail Semiryaga used the Red Army Casualty Notifications to publish a book in which he gave exact figures: 53,522 dead, 16,208 missing, 163,772 wounded and 12,064 frostbitten. Meanwhile, professor N. I. Baryshikov estimated 53,500 dead, a figure close to that of Semiryaga. In 1999, Finnish historian Ohto Manninen estimated Red Army casualties to have been 84,994 dead or prisoners, 186,584 wounded or disabled, 51,892 sick and 9,614 frostbitten. Russian historian Grigoriy Krivosheyev calculated 126,875 dead and 264,908 wounded. In 1999, Yuri Kilin, professor at Petrozavodsk State University, calculated 63,990 dead, and 207,538 wounded and frostbitten, making total casualties 271,528. A further 58,390 men were tagged as sick. In 2007, he revised the estimate of dead to 134,000 and in 2012, he updated the estimate to 138,533. In 2013, Pavel Petrov stated that the Russian State Military Archive has a database confirming 167,976 killed or missing along with the soldiers' names, dates of birth and ranks.

== Contemporary views ==
=== In Soviet historiography ===
The Winter War was one of the first modern wars fought by the Red Army before Nazi Germany's Barbarossa in June 1941. In the Soviet Union, the Winter War was called the "Soviet-Finnish War", and later the term "Border Skirmish" was also used. Over the years Soviet historians and writers presented different answers to basic questions regarding the motive of the war, the instigator, the possibility of avoiding the war, and the end result. The most important aspect was generally considered to be the motive.

The foremost motive of the war, as initially presented by Soviet historiography, was to assist the Finnish working-class people against the tyranny of the White Finns. This was rooted in the Finnish Civil War, in which thousands of Red Guards were killed, and the many communist leaders were expatriated from Finland to the Soviet Union. This motive did not resonate with the Finnish working-class, which stood by its legal government in Helsinki. The Soviets had abandoned this motive by the end of the December 1939.

A new motive was introduced by the Stavka at the turn of the year. Now, the protection of Leningrad and the northeast of the area was presented as the main motive for invading Finland. During the winter of 1940 the planned intervention by the United Kingdom and France was used by Soviet propaganda to show that the Western imperialists were willing to use Finland as springboard against the "socialist motherland". After Nazi Germany assaulted the Soviet Union, the Soviet narrative regarding the Winter War once again changed its course. This time, the main instigator of the Winter War was presented as Nazi Germany. According to this view, Finns had sold their country to Hitler, and had been planning an attack against the Soviet Union for years. Furthermore, Soviet historians argued that the Mannerheim Line was built on Germany's initiative and using its experts.

During the Cold War, the main instigator once again changed in the Soviet narrative. This time, the United States was presented as the head of an alliance whose other participants included the United Kingdom, France, and Nazi Germany. The Mannerheim Line was given funding from the United Kingdom, France, Sweden, Germany and the United States, and additionally, in the years 1938–1939 the Swedish, British and German generals had visited the area and monitored construction work. These multinational contributions demonstrated that Finland was preparing an assault against the Soviet Union with "any military alliance possible".

=== In Russian historiography ===
During the years of perestroika and glasnost, Soviet historiography began to present new views of historical events. The rendition of Winter War studies had its breakthrough when the Soviet historian Mikhail Semiryaga wrote an article for the weekly magazine Ogoniok in 1989. It was the first time the Soviet public were able to read about the scope of the Winter War; that it had not been a mere skirmish and the Soviet government had deployed a large number of personnel and materials to the conflict. Furthermore, Semiryaga wrote that the Soviets began their troop deployments in the spring of 1939. He later wrote an article in which he revealed that the goal of the Red Army was not just to secure Leningrad, but to occupy the whole of Finland.

In the 1990s and 2000s, especially after the Moscow Archives opened, there have been hundreds of articles regarding the Winter War. However, only dozens of monographs have been published. Due to the language barrier, most Russian historians have not made use of Finnish writings and sources.

In the early 1990s a transition began in which old Soviet views were mixed with modern ones. The Soviet diplomat and KGB-agent in Helsinki Viktor Vladimirov wrote Kohti talvisotaa in 1995, a book in which he admitted that the Shelling of Mainila was a Soviet provocation, but insisted that the Finns had an assault plan against the Soviet Union, that Finland was under German influence, and that the Winter War was necessary to secure the city of Leningrad. In 1998, a group of Finnish-Russian historians published a book called Zimnyaya voina 1939–1940. It was a collection of different historical articles, and the book was published a year earlier in Finnish.

Due to a general economic upturn in the early 2000s, commercial war literature became popular again in Russia. Pavel Aptekar wrote Tainy finskoi voiny in 2000 and Sovetsko-finskiye voiny in 2004, in which he emphasized the Finnish side and describes the Soviet assault as "immoral". In 2003, Pavel Petrov and Viktor Stepakov wrote a 542-page long book called Sovetsko-finlandsjaya voina 1939–1940, in which they negate the myth of a major Nazi-German influence on Finnish foreign policy, and demonstrate that the United Kingdom had a larger role. However, more conservative literature has also been published, such as Rozdeniye i krah by Nikolai Baryshnikov and Vladimir Baryshikov in 2000, in which the authors revive traditional Soviet views. For example, they claim not to be sure which party instigated the Shelling of Mainila. The book was also published in Finnish by the Johan Beckman Institute.

=== In Finnish historiography ===
During the period of Finlandization, the Finnish president Urho Kekkonen gave a speech in April 1973 in which he stated that Winter War was unnecessary. The comments were received positively in the Kremlin and among the Finnish leftists. Similar opinions were presented by the Swedish prime minister Tage Erlander and Finnish novelist Väinö Linna. The comments of President Kekkonen were objected to by the majority of Finns, however, as most had supported the Winter War and criticizing it was not looked upon favourably. However, the Continuation War could be openly criticized by the 1970s.

The 50th anniversary of the Winter War in 1989 marked a new era in Finland. In the same year the film Talvisota (Winter War) was released, which was the most expensive Finnish film made at the time. In the early 1990s the general atmosphere in Finland regarding the Winter War changed drastically, as the Soviet Union collapsed and Moscow Archives were opened, which brought new information about the war to light. Finns were able to openly show their respect for the Finnish soldiers of the three wars of 1939–1944, which would have been impossible in the 1970s. In the 2004 television programme Suuret suomalaiset (Great Finns) three Finnish people that had been involved in World War II were voted into the top four of the most significant Finns in history: Field Marshal Carl Gustaf Emil Mannerheim (1st place), President Risto Ryti (2nd place), and General Adolf Ehrnrooth (4th place).

== Possible Sovietization and resettlement ==
In the years since the Winter War, it has been speculated that the Winter War could have possibly been avoided had Finland agreed to Soviet demands for military bases and to conclude the "friendship, cooperation and mutual assistance treaty" between countries during the negotiations of 1938–39. Estonia, Latvia and Lithuania had agreed to Soviet demands and a year later were occupied and annexed – it has been brought to question whether Finland could have been the exception.

According to Finnish historian Timo Vihavainen, there are many arguments against this theory. According to Vihavainen, Stalin trusted only the Red Army, and he used it to consolidate his control of neighbouring countries. Treaties such as nonaggression pacts interested him little. Neutrality, when it ran counter to the interests of the Soviet Union, was "objectively" considered its opposite and therefore as serving the interests of Germany. The Soviet Union accused Finland of being under complete German influence in the 1930s. In reality, the general attitude of Finland towards both Germany and the Soviet Union was overwhelmingly negative.

It has also come into question whether the Soviet intent was to occupy all of Finland or just strategic areas near Leningrad. According to the document approved in 1939 by Zhdanov, Molotov, and Kuusinen, the Finnish political system was meant to be altered after the Soviet occupation by establishing a "people's republic" and capturing "enemies of the state". Marshal Ivan Konev wrote that he was informed of a conversation between Stalin, Kliment Voroshilov, and Ivan Isakov. Stalin was said to have remarked in the beginning of the Winter War that: "We shall have to resettle the Finns... the population of Finland is smaller than that of Leningrad, they can be resettled."
