= ProKarelia =

Finnish Irredentist group

ProKarelia is a Finnish marginal irredentist group that works for the return to Finland of Finnish Karelia, Petsamo, Salla and some islands in Gulf of Finland ceded to the Soviet Union in past treaties in Moscow and Paris (See Karelian question in Finnish politics). As a preliminary goal the group hopes to overturn the articles of the Paris Peace Treaty of 1947 and remove Finnish responsibility in starting the Continuation War.

ProKarelia strives to make the Karelian question better known. According to the organization itself, ProKarelia's ideas do not include aggressive actions, nor do the association participate in demonstrations. This however conflates with their statements and remarks about the local Russian population and their plans to remove the local Russian population. The organisation was accused of separatism and Russophobia.

ProKarelia publishes Internet pages in eight languages. It mails articles to decision-makers all over the world. ProKarelia also publishes the Karelia Klubi journal four times a year. They also published magazine Karjalan Kuvalehti.

ProKarelia's chairman was Heikki A. Reenpää (†2020). Their general secretary is Veikko Saksi who keeps blogs in various Finnish blogging sites and posts articles from ProKarelia website and his own writings in these and in Facebook (up until 2019). He has also made some comments in media. Former commander of the Finnish Air Force Rauno Meriö is mentioned as one of the advisers.

ProKarelia claimed they had 2,300 members in 2009.

Their website has gone offline during year 2020. Also the company that published their magazine has ceased operations at the end of 2020.

== Positions ==
ProKarelia has repeatedly accused former social democrat president Mauno Koivisto of treason or breaking the constitution.

In 2006 ProKarelia made a claim on their website that incumbent social democrat president Tarja Halonen had held a speech in 1976 where she claimed capitalism will destroy itself and wished Finland to join Soviet Union. This claim made it to the mainstream media, where it was quickly dismissed as false.

Article on ProKarelia website claims that European Union is a socialist project, initially funded by "Jewish bankers" and the CIA.

In 2009 ProKarelia organized a film screening showing The Soviet Story.

In 2015 Veikko Saksi predicted in an interview that the Russian Federation will collapse in two years and the Republic of Karelia will join Finland.

=== Nord Stream ===
In 2009 the activists of ProKarelia tried to block the building of the Nord Stream 1 operated gas pipeline between Russia and Western Europe. Making a large mining claim of the sea floor between Finland and Estonia, the actual purpose was to gain a bargaining chip to require the return of the Russian territories lost to Soviet Union during the Second World War. The mining estate was never granted, but the bad faith operation was widely reported in the media.
