= Evacuee Flag Day =

Flag flying day in Finland

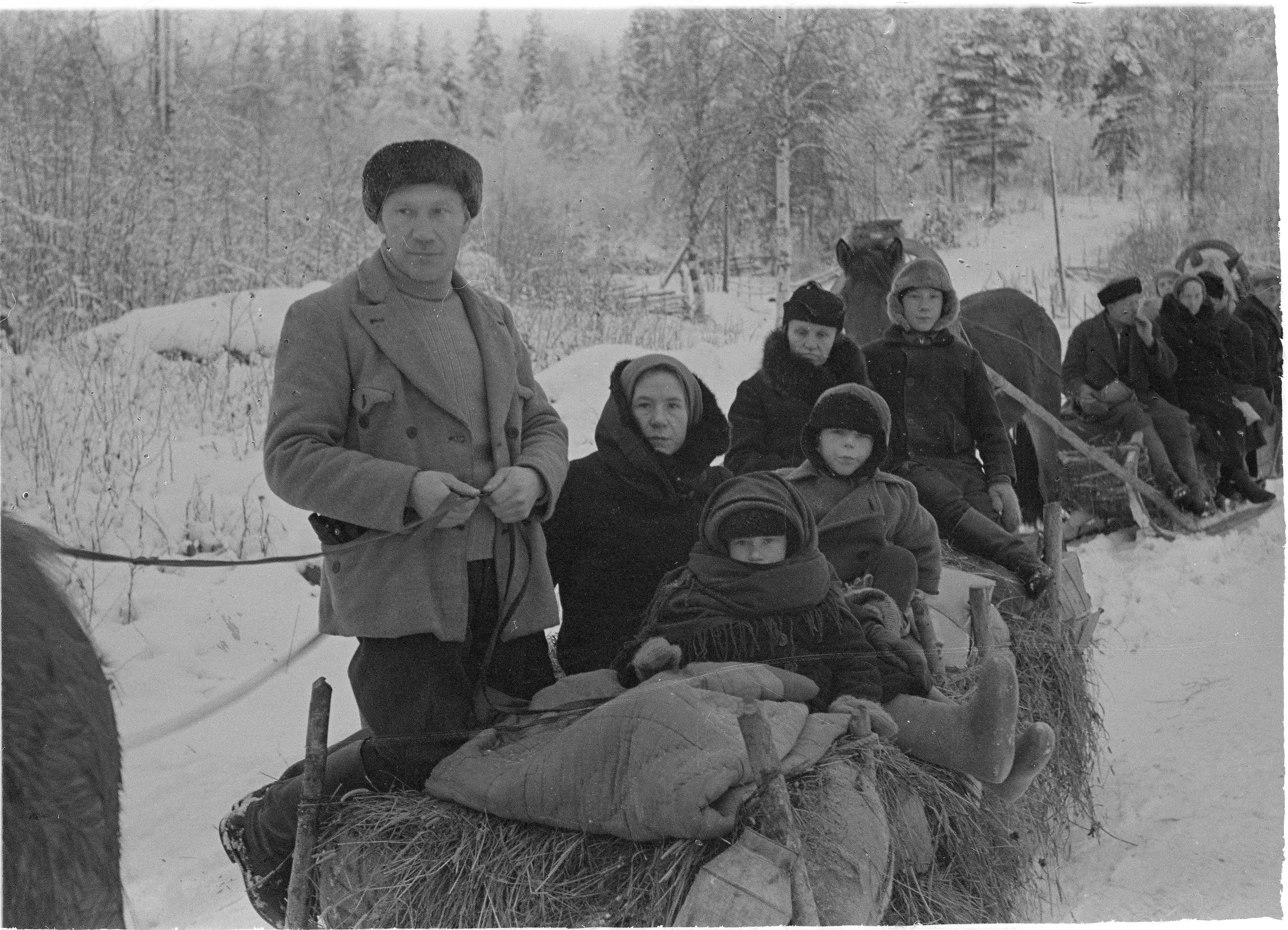
- The flag day aims to honour, among the other evacuee groups, the Karelian emigrants during the World War II. The photo shows a family from the Karelian Isthmus setting off in the early days of the Winter War.
- Official name: Finnish: Evakkojen liputuspäivä
- Observed by: Finland
- Significance: remembrance of the evacuation of Finnish Karelia
- Date: 20 April
- Next time: 20 April 2026
- Frequency: annual

Evacuee Flag Day (Finnish: evakkojen liputuspäivä) is a flag flying day in Finland observed on 20 April. The day commemorates those who were forced to leave their homes, either permanently or temporarily, due to the events of the Winter War, the Continuation War and the Lapland War during World War II.

The flag-raising day was chosen to be the founding day of the Karelian Association. The first such commemorative day was held on Easter Day in 2025 at the initiative of the Karelian Association. The organization invited state institutions, municipalities, parishes, associations, companies and private individuals to join in the flag-raising ceremony, and many of them decided to participate in the celebration of the day.

The Karelian Association and the Karelian Club of the Finnish Parliament have tried for many years to have an official flag-raising day in memory of the Karelian evacuees. A written question was submitted to the Minister of the Interior in Parliament in 2020, 2021 and 2024, but the official day was met with a negative response.

In her response to a written question in 2024, Minister of the Interior Mari Rantanen stated that the topic is valuable and important, but there are already three flag-raising days related to it: the Defence Forces Flag Day (4 June), National Veterans' Day (27 April) and Memorial Day (the third Sunday in May). In addition, the Ministry of the Interior recommended flying the flag on anniversaries of the end of wars. In 2024, there were 26 official and established flag-raising days, as well as four recommended days. A large number may cause flag-raising fatigue and raise negative feelings among citizens. Therefore, the Ministry did not see it necessary to promote the evacuees' own flag-raising day, but since the Finnish flag can be flown freely, citizens, organisations and other parties can establish a flag-raising day by flying it on a specific day.

For 2026, the Ministry of the Interior recommends 20 April as a general flag-flying day.
