= 25 mm APX modèle 1937 =

WW2 French anti-tank gun

Canon de 25 SA modèle 1937
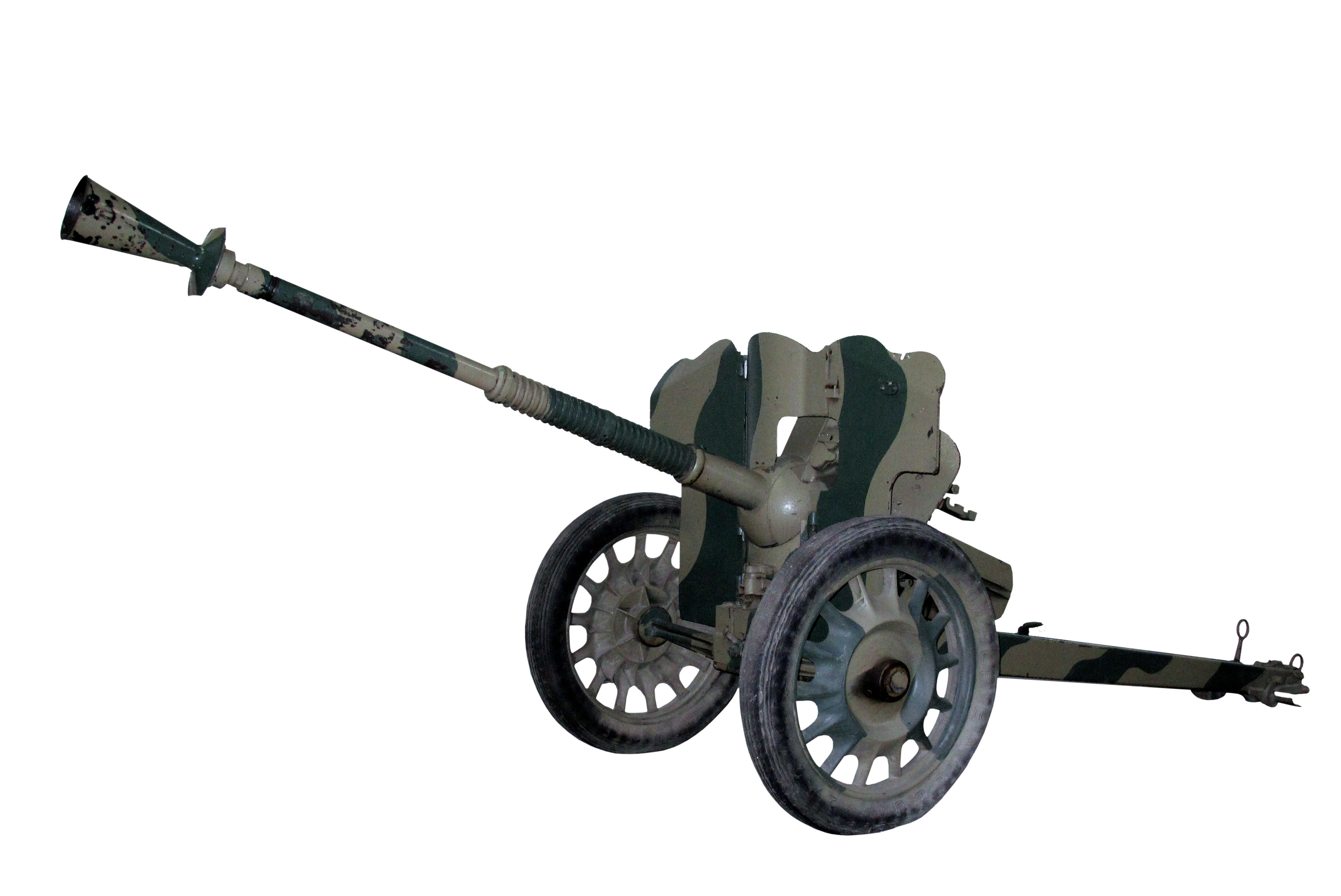
- A mle 1937 on display at the Saumur armour museum.
- Type: Anti-tank gun
- Place of origin: France

Service history
- In service: 1938–1945
- Used by: See § Users
- Wars: World War II

Production history
- Designer: Puteaux
- Designed: 1936–1937
- Manufacturer: Puteaux
- Produced: 1938–1940
- No. built: 2,485+

Specifications
- Mass: 310 kg (680 lb)
- Length: 3.71 m (12 ft 2 in)
- Barrel length: 1.92 m (6 ft 4 in) L/77
- Width: 1.05 m (3 ft 5 in)
- Height: 1.10 m (3 ft 7 in)
- Shell: 25×193.5mmR
- Shell weight: 320 g (11 oz)
- Caliber: 25 mm (0.98 in)
- Action: Semi-automatic
- Breech: Vertical sliding breech block
- Recoil: Hydro Spring
- Carriage: Split-trail
- Elevation: -10° / +26°
- Traverse: 37°
- Rate of fire: 15–20 rounds/min
- Muzzle velocity: 900 m/s (2,950 ft/s)
- Effective firing range: 1 km (1,090 yd)
- Maximum firing range: 1.8 km (1,970 yd)
- Feed system: Manual

The Canon de 25 mm semi-automatique modèle 1937 (25 mm SA-L 37) was a French anti-tank gun that saw service in the first years of the Second World War.

== Design ==
The mle 1937 was a lightened and lengthened version of the Hotchkiss designed Canon de 25 mm semi-automatique modèle 1934. The mle 1937 was designed and produced by Puteaux and it weighed 310 kg (680 lb) vs 480 kg (1,060 lb) for the mle 1934. The barrel of the mle 1937 was also 125 mm (5 in) longer than the mle 1934.

The two guns were intended for different users and modes of transportation. The mle 1934 was intended to be used by motorized units and towed by motor vehicles while the mle 1937 was intended to be used by infantry units and towed by horses. Both had poor armor piercing performance of 40 mm (1.6 in) at 400 m (440 yd) and while easy to use both were too lightly constructed to be durable.

=== Barrel ===
The barrel is longer than similar cannons design in the interwar era, which allows it to achieve higher muzzle velocities. Standard ammunition achieved a velocity of 900 m/s (2,950 ft/s) and the rounds labeled with "Charge Forte" (Strong Charge) achieving 960 m/s (3,150 ft/s). At the end of the barrel is a combination muzzle break (to reduce recoil) and flash hider (to reduce visual signature).

=== Recoil System ===
The Mle 37's recoil system consisted of a hydraulic buffer used to absorb the rearward recoil during firing and a uniquely positioned spring around the exterior of the barrel that absorbs recoil and returns the barrel to battery. The semi-automatic operations utilizes the forward movement of the barrel to drop the break block and eject the empty casing.

=== Firing mechanism ===
The firing mechanism is sophisticated for the era, utilizing a bicycle brake style trigger with thumb safety located on the traverse wheel on the left side of the cannon. This allowed the gunner to easily fire the cannon while tracking moving targets. The sighting system consisted of a 4x optic and iron sights. The cannon could be fired on its wheels or a monopod located under the carriage could be deployed along with the spades at the rear for a more stable, but less mobile firing platform.

=== Construction ===
At 680 lbs the cannon is exceptionally light weight compared to similar sized cannons of that era, most of which weighed in excess of 1,000 lbs. This was achieved by utilizing thinner materials, additional machining to remove excess materials, and lighter weight materials such as the magnesium wheel spokes. This lightweight design increases mobility on the battlefield but increased production costs and decreased long term durability.

=== Features ===
The armor shield was 7 mm thick and provided minimal protection to the cannon and crew from small arms fire. During transport the trail is latched together, a cover is applied over the muzzle, and the shield is fold forward to help with balance and prevent mud from sticking to the edges of the shield. Attached to the right trail was a wrench for tightening the muzzle break and a wood rod that slide through the steel loops at the end of the trail to aid the crew during transport.

== Users ==
- Finland − 50 French 25 mm M/37 antitank guns were purchased during the Winter War, but only 40 of them were delivered in February 1940 through Norway. The remaining ten guns were captured by the Germans when they invaded Norway in the spring of 1940. About half of the guns, which had arrived during the Winter War, saw front line service during it and three of them were lost in battle. During the Interim Peace the Germans sold 200 captured guns to Finland: 133 of them were model M/34s and 67 were model M/37s, and they were designated 25 PstK/34 and 25 PstK/37, respectively. They were withdrawn from front line use by 1943.
- France − An unknown number were used by the French during the Battle of France during World War II. At least one Free French Forces Bren carrier was converted into a tank destroyer in Syria, photographed in 1945.
- Germany − The Germans used a number of captured guns under the designation 2.5 cm PaK 113(f) and these were used to arm Atlantic Wall fortifications in France and the occupied Channel Islands.
- Romania
- Spain − 150 mle 1937 guns were sold to Spain by the Germans during 1943.
- Turkey − Unknown number of 25 mm puteaux cannons were used by the cavalry forces of Turkish army as anti tank weapon during the second world war. These weapons were showcased during military drills of 1941.
- Italy − 43 units were transferred from Germany to Italy after the surrender of France followed by an additional 250 guns that were used to strengthen the Italian Army in North Africa.

== Gallery ==
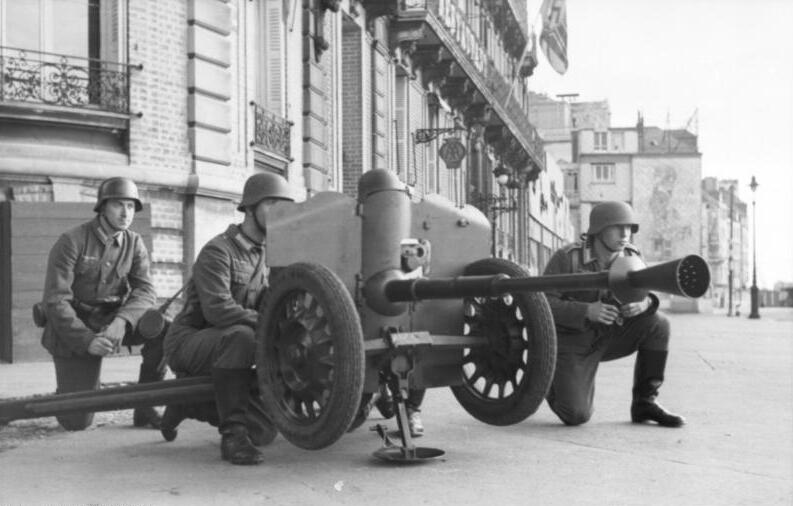
A 2.5 cm Panzerabwehrkanone 113(f) in German service in Northern France.

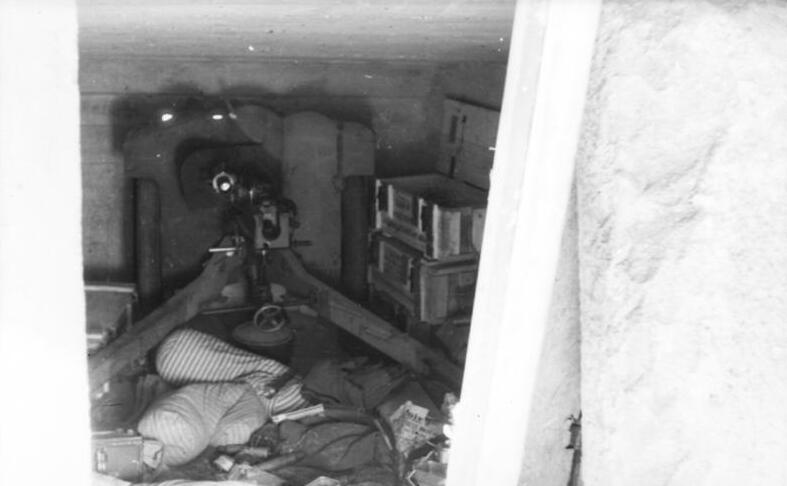
A 2.5 cm Panzerabwehrkanone 113(f) in German service in a fortification.

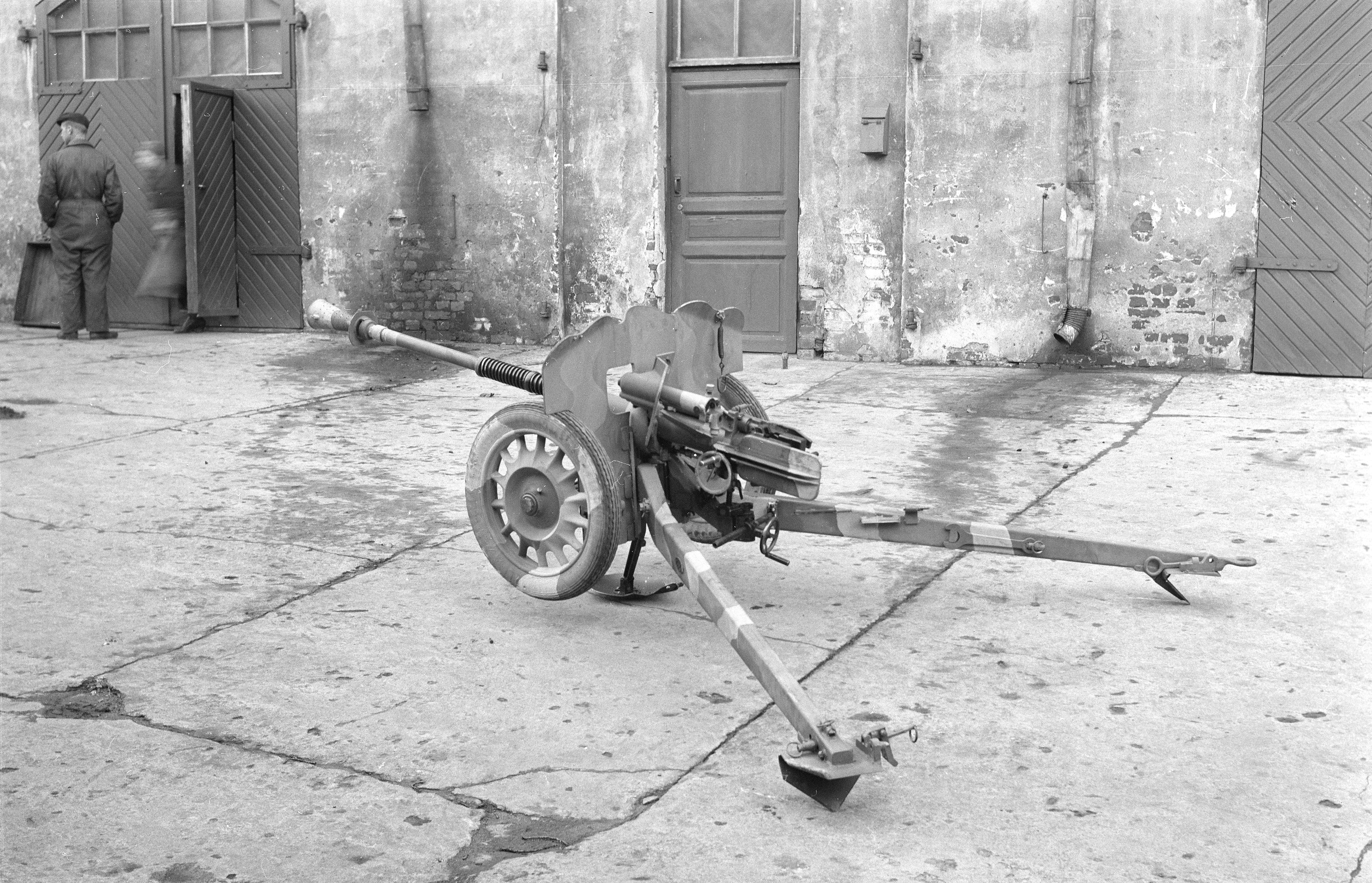
A Finnish 25 PstK37.

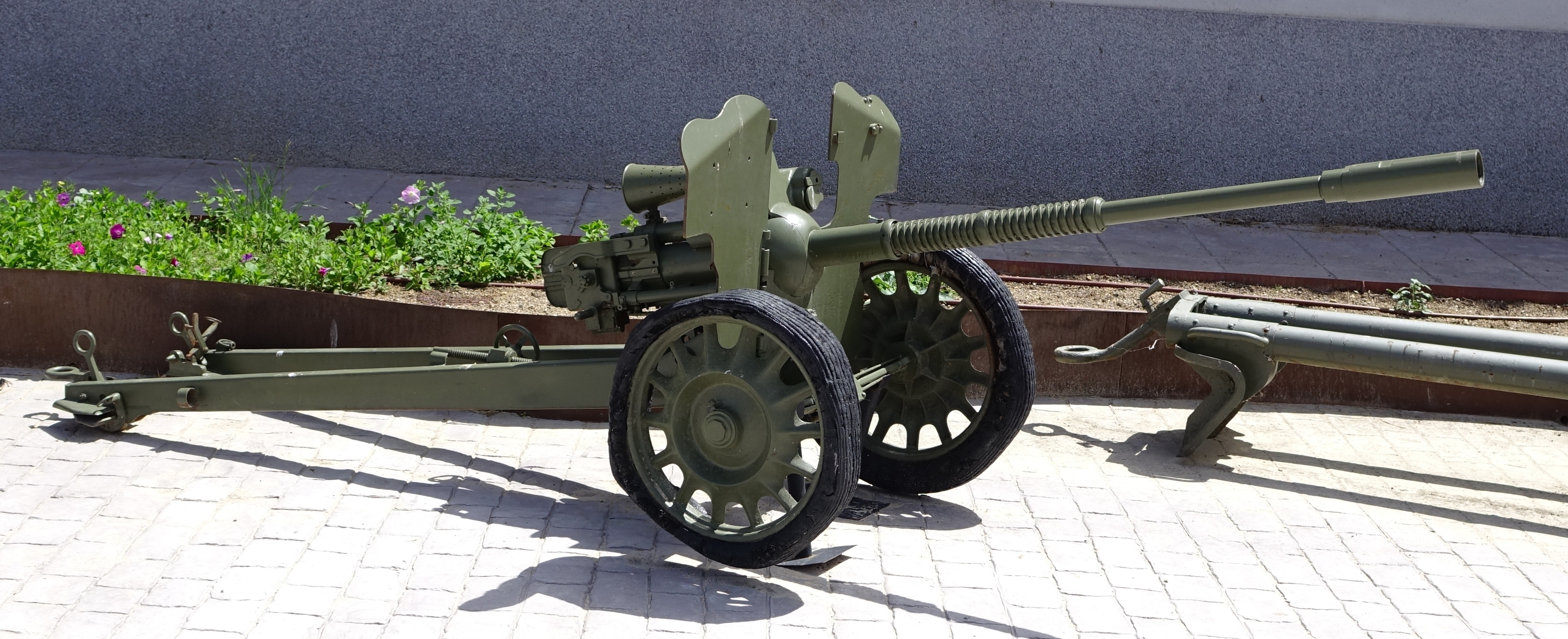
A Spanish mle 1937.

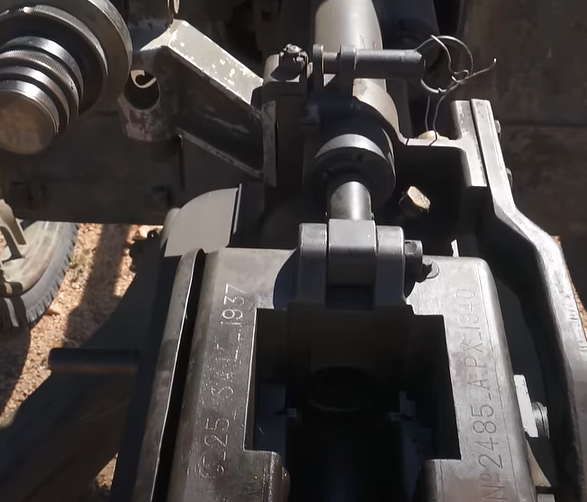
Photo showing highest known serial number 2485.

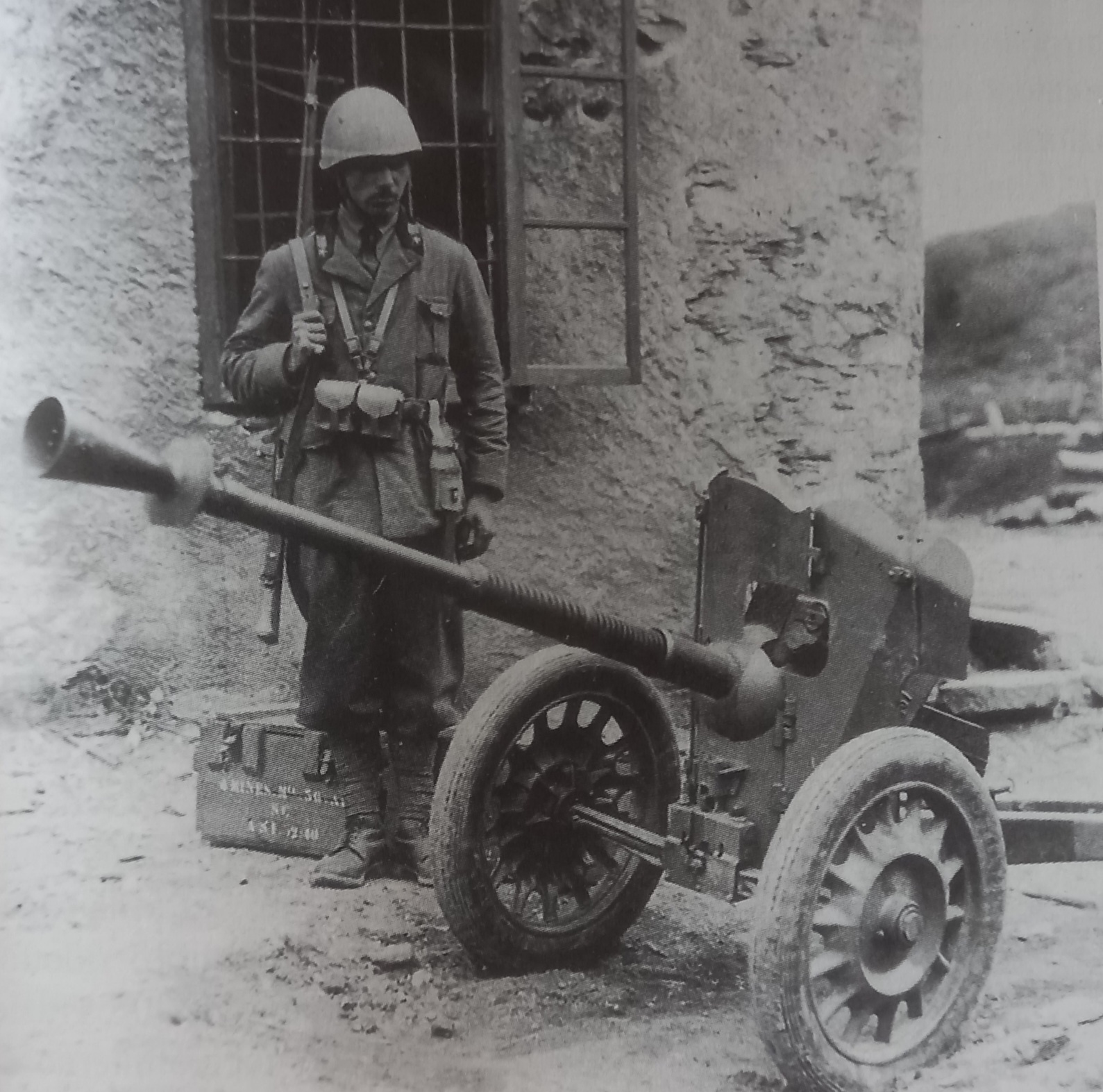
Italian soldier with damaged Puteaux.

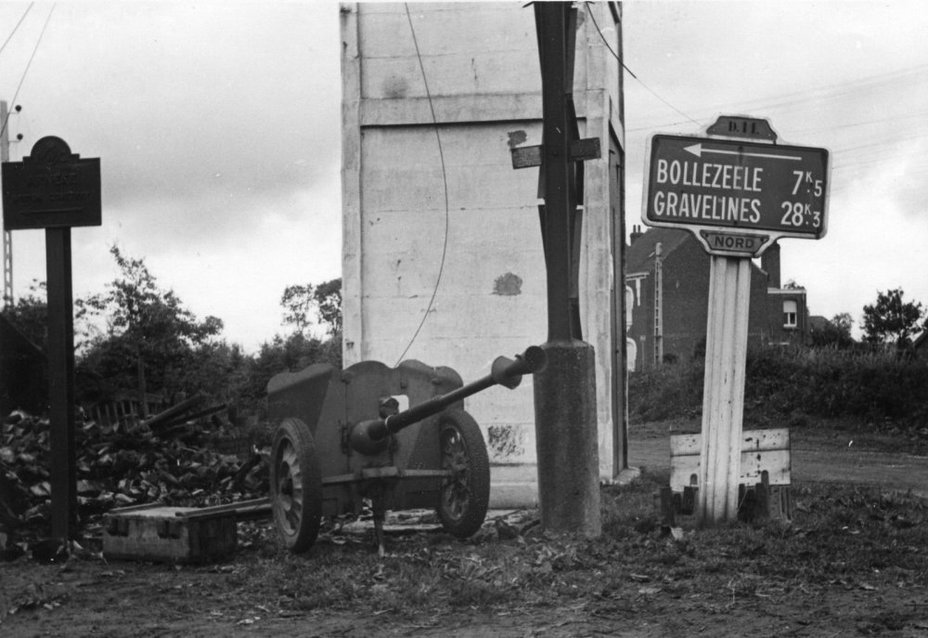
25mm Puteaux anti-tank gun abandoned during the Battle of France

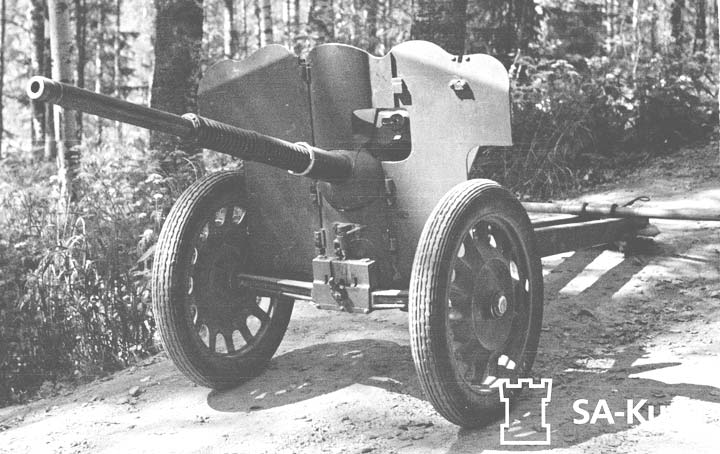
25mm Puteaux with transport bar installed
