= Karelian question =

Dispute in Finnish politics

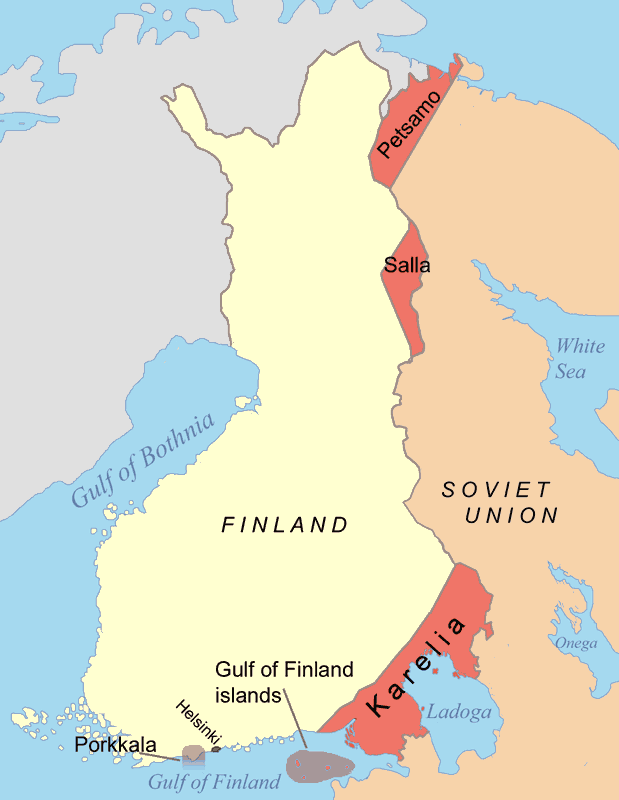
Map showing areas ceded by Finland to the Soviet Union; Porkkala was returned to Finland in 1956.

The Karelian question or Karelian issue (Finnish: Karjala-kysymys, Swedish: Karelska frågan, Russian: Карельский вопрос) is a dispute in Finnish politics over whether to try to regain control over the section of Karelia ceded to the Soviet Union in the Moscow Peace Treaty. Despite the name "Karelian question", the term may refer also to the return of Petsamo (ceded in the Moscow Armistice), ceded parts of Salla and Kuusamo, and four islands in the Gulf of Finland. Sometimes the phrase "debate on the return of the ceded territories" (luovutettujen alueiden palautuskeskustelu, Swedish: debatten om tillbakalämningen av de avträdda territorierna) is used. The Karelian question remains a matter of public debate rather than a political issue.

== History ==
The Karelian question arose when Finland was forced to cede territories to the Soviet Union after the Winter War in the Moscow Peace Treaty in 1940. Most Finnish citizens were evacuated from the ceded areas. Most of them returned during the Continuation War and eventually were evacuated again in 1944. The Soviet Union insisted the ceded areas be completely evacuated in 10 days. The evacuees were partly compensated for their losses; farmers, for example, received land in proportion to their earlier holdings. Usually, the compensation was about one third of the original farm. Compensation for movable property was much less. However, all evacuee families had a right to receive a small farm, and/or a plot for a detached house or a flat. The land used for these grants was confiscated by the state from municipalities and private owners. Financial compensation was funded by a general property tax of 10 to 30%, levied over a period of several years. Because the vast majority of the evacuees who had to settle in the rest of Finland were from ceded Karelia, the question was labeled The Karelian Question. After the Winter War, Karelian municipalities and parishes established Karjalan Liitto (the Karelian Association) to defend the rights of Karelians in Finland.

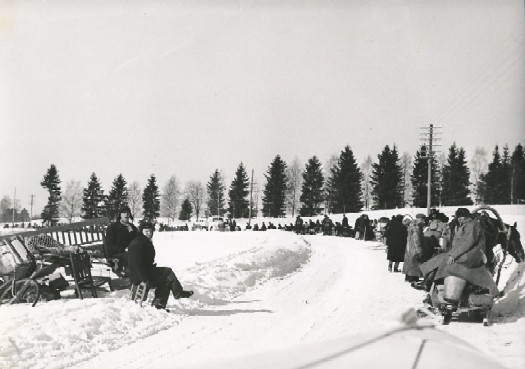
Evacuees from Muolaa moving towards Western Finland during winter 1940.

During the Cold War, the Karelian-born Finnish politician Johannes Virolainen lobbied for the return of Karelia. President Urho Kekkonen also tried to reacquire the territory, especially when the Soviet Union returned the peninsula of Porkkala to Finland in 1956. There was, however, no significant public controversy about the case, because Kekkonen wanted to keep it quiet. The last time Kekkonen tried to raise it was in 1972, but he had no success, and public discussion died out in the 1970s.

After the breakup of the Soviet Union, the Karelian question somewhat re-surfaced in Finland. According to an article by the Finnish newspaper Helsingin Sanomat in August 2007, the Russian president Boris Yeltsin unofficially offered to sell ceded Karelia to Finland in 1991 but was declined. However, according to many Finnish political leaders and the Russian vice Prime Minister of the time, there were no such offers, only unofficial probing of the idea. Andrei Fyodorov, an advisor of Boris Yeltsin, told the Helsingin Sanomat that he was part of a group that was tasked by the government of Russia in 1991–1992 with calculating the price of returning ceded Karelia to Finland. This price was set at 15 billion US dollars. According to Fyodorov, Finnish president Mauno Koivisto and Finnish foreign minister Paavo Väyrynen were aware of these unofficial discussions.

== 21st century ==
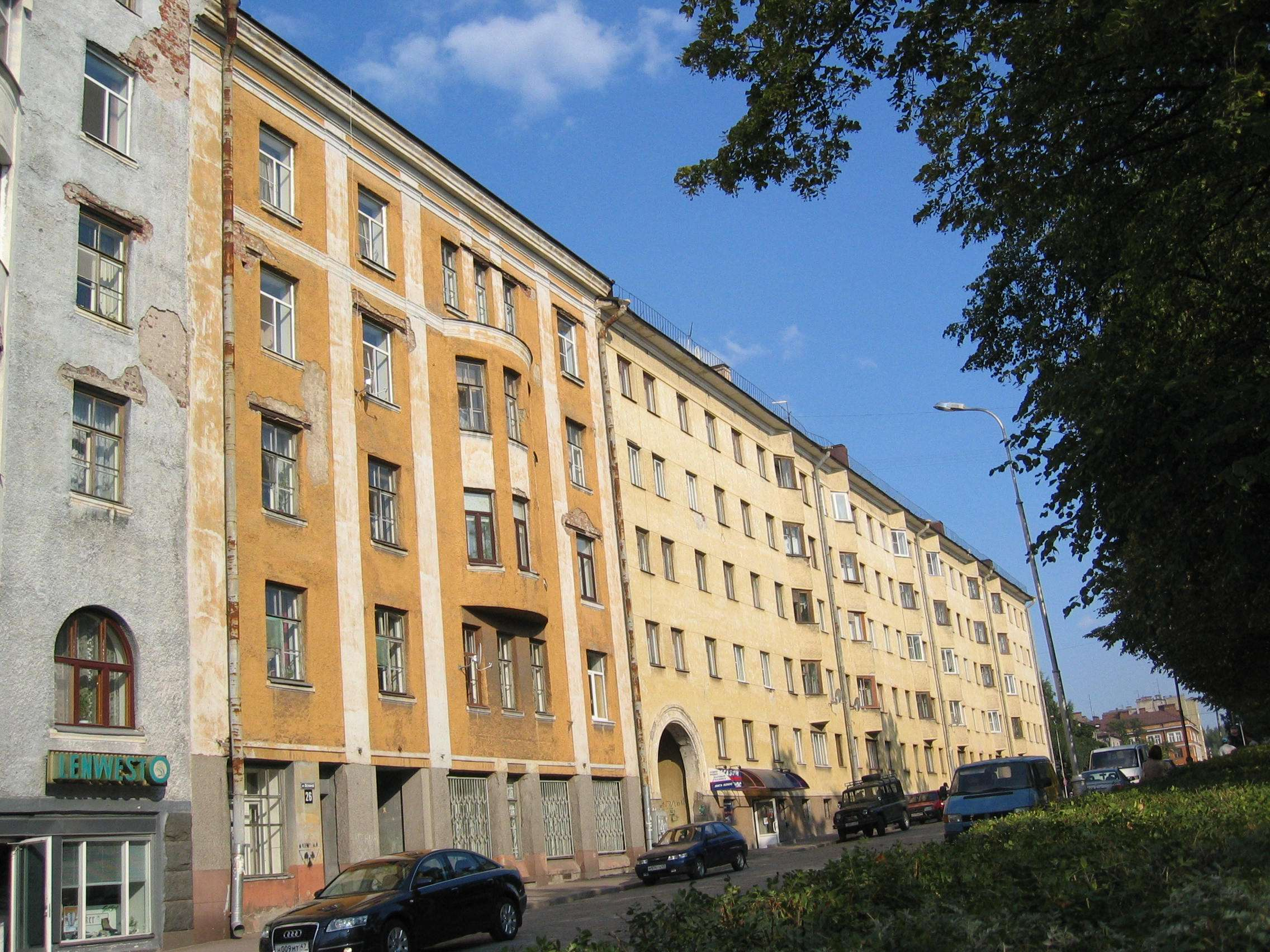
Finnish era buildings in Vyborg

Karjalan Liitto is an interest group of Karelian evacuees which hopes that ceded Karelia will once again become part of Finland at some point, but does not openly demand it. Some smaller groups, such as ProKarelia, continue to campaign for the peaceful return of Karelia. However, no serious political party has openly supported this goal, and Finnish politicians generally say there is no need for it, citing Finland's peace treaty with Russia. There are some individual politicians who support the return of Karelia, such as MEP Ari Vatanen, and two candidates in the presidential election of 2006: Timo Soini and Arto Lahti. Other candidates have stated that Finland has signed a peace treaty and should not campaign for the return of what are now Russian-developed territories. During a debate prior to the 2012 presidential election Timo Soini reiterated his view that, if elected, he would advance the issue.

=== Official opinions ===
Both Russia and Finland have repeatedly stated that no open territorial dispute exists between the two countries. Finland's official stance is that the borders may be changed through peaceful negotiations, although there is currently no need to hold open talks, as Russia has shown no intention of returning the ceded areas, or discussing the question. In 1994 Boris Yeltsin commented that the "seizure of Finnish Karelia" was an example of Stalin's totalitarian and aggressive politics. Later in 1997 he stated that the matter was closed. In 2000 Russian president Vladimir Putin stated that such discussions may endanger Finnish–Russian relations, and in 2001 he said that "changing borders is not the best way to resolve problems", but that possible solutions would be "integration and cooperation".

In 1998 Finnish president Martti Ahtisaari said that "Finland's official position is that it does not have territorial demands on Russia. However, if Russia wants to discuss returning the ceded areas, Finland is ready for that." Several other politicians holding government office, such as the former foreign minister Erkki Tuomioja and prime minister Matti Vanhanen, have made statements along the same lines.

When commenting on poll results on 18 January 2005, the foreign minister of Russia Sergei Lavrov stated that if Russia were to be asked to return the ceded areas, "the answer would be absolutely negative".

=== Polls and popular opinion ===
The latest polls show that approximately 26% to 38% of Finns would like to see the ceded section of Karelia returned to Finnish control, while 51% to 62% would oppose such a move. In Russia, people associate the word "Karelia" with the Republic of Karelia instead of Finnish Karelia, which makes conducting polls more difficult. In a 1999 poll by MTV3, 34% of the people of Vyborg supported returning ceded Karelia to Finland and 57% were opposed. Vyborg and the rest of ceded Karelia outside the Republic of Karelia nowadays contain very few ethnic Finns, and is almost exclusively inhabited by people who moved there during the Soviet era and their descendants.

In a poll conducted by the newspaper Karjala and the research institute MC-Info Oy on 13 October 2005, 36% of Finns supported the return of ceded territories, compared to 51% who are opposed. In August 2005, a poll by Helsingin Sanomat and Suomen Gallup, determined that 30% of Finns supported and 62% opposed the return. In a poll by Taloustutkimus and Karjalan Liitto conducted in May 2005, support was 26% while 58% were opposed. A year earlier, a poll by STT showed 38% supporting and 57% opposing. A poll by Taloustutkimus was criticized by ProKarelia for asking leading questions, such as, "Do you support the return of Karelia, even if it would mean more tense relations or even war with Russia?" 5% of supporters and of those who declined to respond supported the return even under these circumstances (2.1% of all replies).

Many of the people who were born in ceded Karelia and were evacuated want this region to become part of Finland. According to a 2005 Gallup poll, older people (ages 65 and up) and young people (15–25) supported the idea more strongly than the generation of their parents (25–65) who grew up during the Cold War. Former president Mauno Koivisto was against a discussion about the question. Support for regaining the ceded areas is also strong among minor nationalist right-wing groups.

== Problems and arguments ==
=== Price ===
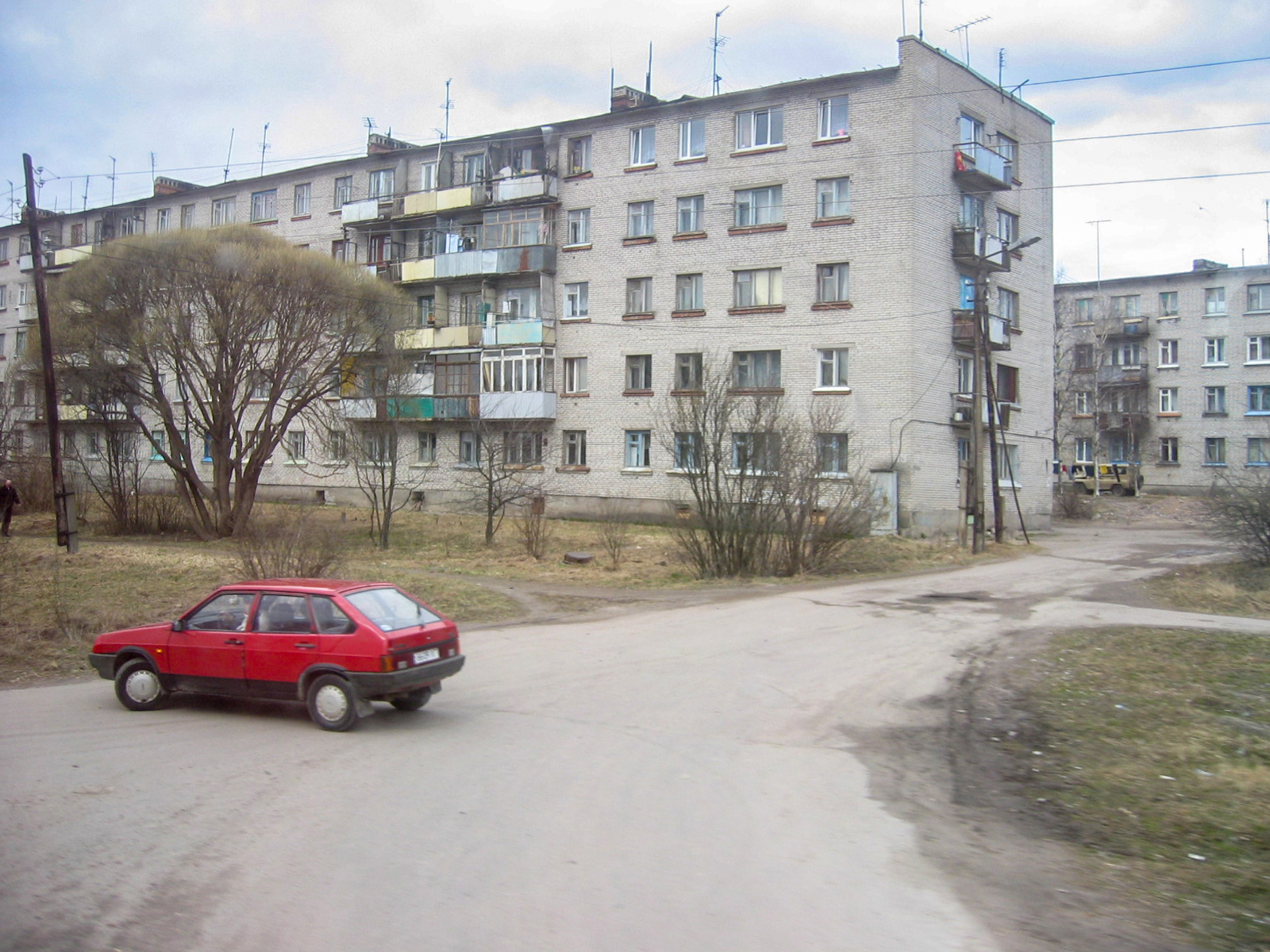
Blocks of flats built in the Soviet era in Svetogorsk (Enso)

One of the main reasons for opposing the return is the fear of the costs it would bring. According to another poll conducted by Helsingin Sanomat, 42% of Finns opposing the return list that as the most important single reason. The standard of living on the Russian side of the border is much lower than on the Finnish side. The GDP (PPP) per capita in Finland is about double that of Russia.

The cost of upgrading the infrastructure of ceded Karelia has been researched only by supporters of the idea. According to a survey conducted by ProKarelia, the area has natural advantages that, under Finnish rule, would make it a centre of trade with Russia and industry and thus bring economic growth fast enough to solve the entire problem. According to both ProKarelian research and Arto Lahti's estimate, the price of return would be about 30 billion euro.

=== Population ===
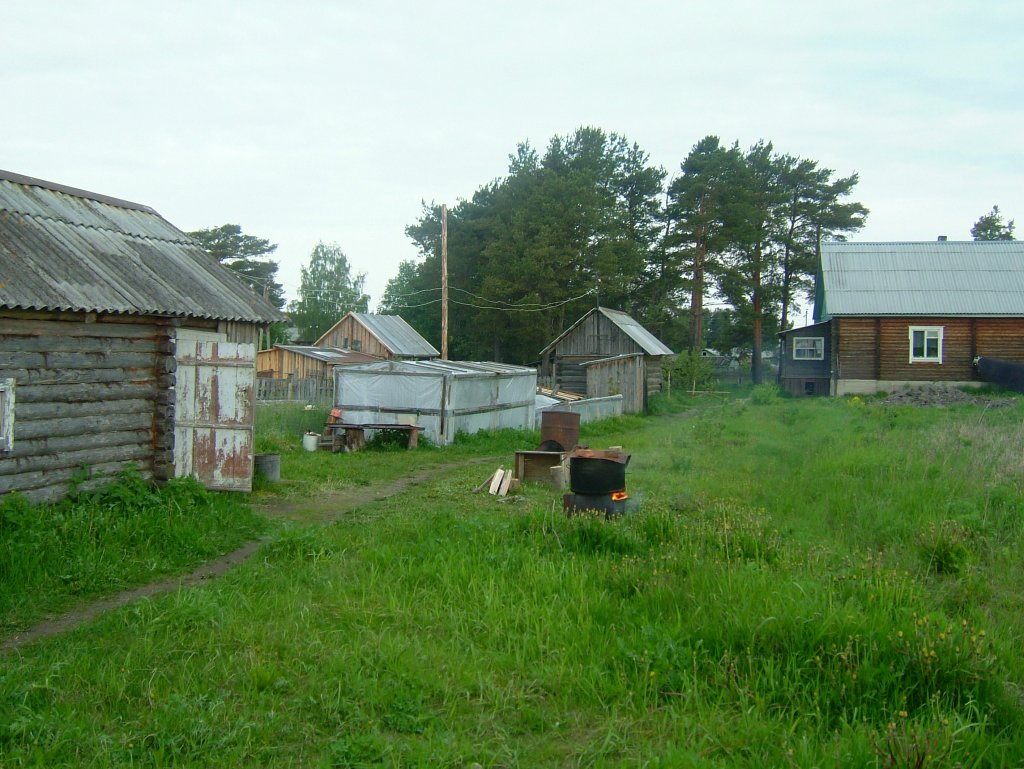
Countryside houses. A picture from Sortavala.

The area of Karelia ceded to Russia is inhabited mostly by people who moved there from Ukraine, Belarus and Russia, and their descendants. The fate of these people is a major issue in discussions of the return of ceded Karelia to Finland. According to a poll by Finnish newspaper Helsingin Sanomat, 14% of people opposing return said their biggest concern was the tensions that could be caused by a larger Russian-speaking minority in Finland. As of 2004, there were about 370,000 Russians living in the region.

If the inhabitants were allowed to stay in their homes, Finland would receive a few hundred thousand new Russian-speaking people with no experience of living in Finnish society. If services for them in their own language were to be provided, Finland would need many more officials capable of speaking Russian. In ProKarelia's vision, nearly half of the Russian population in ceded Karelia would be estimated to choose to move to Russia, and even more would leave if Finland paid their expenses for doing so. However, most of the Russian-speaking population of ceded Karelia were born there and have spent all their life in the region.

== See also ==
- History of Karelia
- Continuation War
- Former eastern territories of Germany
- Greater Finland
- Interim Peace
- Irredentism
- Kaliningrad question
- Lapland War
- Moscow Armistice
- Moscow Peace Treaty
- Reunification
- Territorial changes of the Baltic states
- Treaty of Tartu (Russian–Finnish)
- Unification of Moldova and Romania
- Winter War
- Pan-Finnicism
