= Moscow Peace Treaty =

Peace treaty signed by Finland and the Soviet Union on 12 March 1940

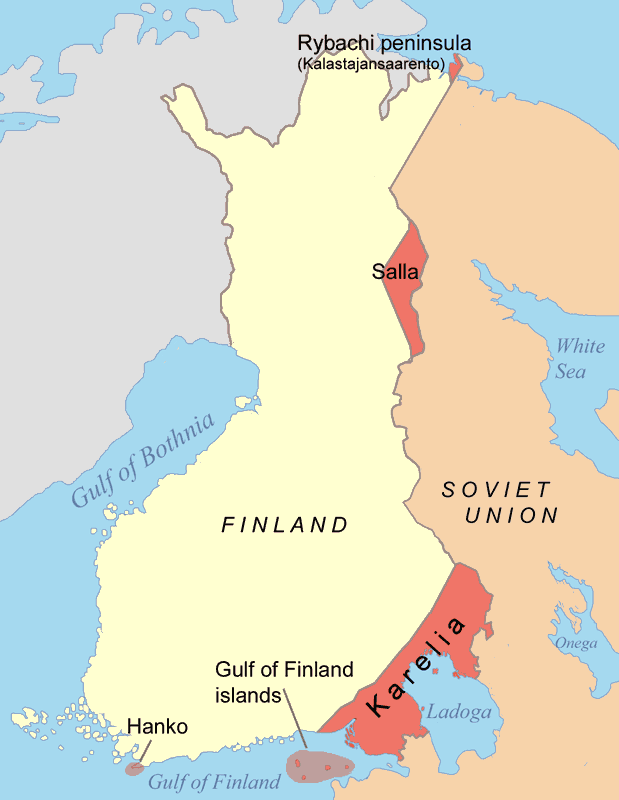
- Areas ceded by Finland to the Soviet Union
- Type: Bilateral treaty
- Signed: 12 March 1940
- Location: Moscow, Russian SFSR, USSR
- Parties: Soviet Union; Finland
- Ratifiers: Soviet Union; Finland

The Moscow Peace Treaty was signed by Finland and the Soviet Union on 12 March 1940, and the ratifications were exchanged on 21 March. It marked the end of the 105-day Winter War, upon which Finland ceded border areas to the Soviet Union. The treaty was signed by Vyacheslav Molotov, Andrei Zhdanov and Aleksandr Vasilevsky for the Soviet Union, and Risto Ryti, Juho Kusti Paasikivi, Rudolf Walden and Väinö Voionmaa for Finland. The terms of the treaty were not reversed after the dissolution of the Soviet Union. The Karelian question refers to the debate within Finland over the possible reacquisition of this ceded territory.

== Background ==
The Winter War began on 30 November 1939 with the Soviet invasion of Finland. On 29 January 1940, Soviet Minister of Foreign Affairs Vyacheslav Molotov put an end to the puppet Terijoki Government and recognized the Ryti–Tanner government as the legal government of Finland, informing it that the Soviet Union was willing to negotiate peace. The Finnish government received the first tentative peace conditions from the Soviet Union (through Stockholm) two days later. The Soviets made larger claims than they had before the war started. The demands were for Finland to cede the Karelian Isthmus, including the city of Viipuri, and Finland's shore of Lake Ladoga. The Hanko Peninsula was to be leased to the Soviet Union for 30 years.

Finland rejected the demands and intensified its pleas to Sweden, France and the United Kingdom for military support by regular troops. The reports from the front still held out hope for Finland, anticipating a League of Nations intervention. Positive signals, however inconstant, from France and Britain and more realistic expectations of troops from Sweden, for which plans and preparations had been made throughout the 1930s, were further reasons for Finland not to rush into peace negotiations. (See Winter War § Foreign support for more details.)

In February 1940, Finland's commander-in-chief, Marshal Carl Gustaf Emil Mannerheim expressed his pessimism about the military situation, which prompted the government to start peace talks on 29 February, the same day the Red Army started an attack on Viipuri (now Vyborg).

== Terms ==
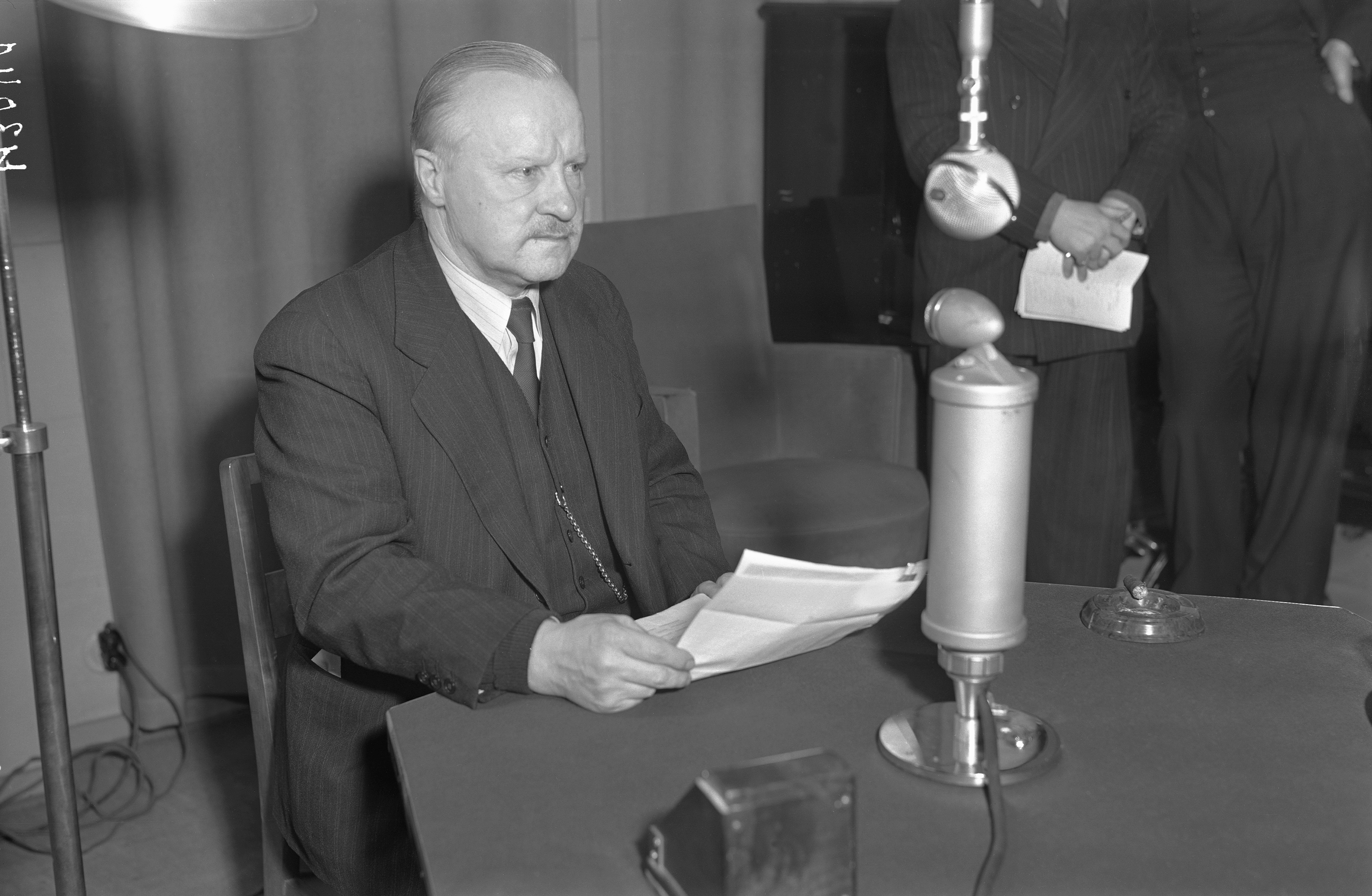
Finnish Foreign Minister Väinö Tanner reading the terms of the peace treaty on the Finnish radio at noon on 13 March 1940.

On 6 March, a Finnish delegation, led by Finnish Prime Minister Risto Ryti, travelled to Moscow. During the negotiations, the Red Army were close to surrounding Viipuri. Finnish President Kyösti Kallio resisted the idea of giving up any territory to the Soviet Union, but eventually agreed to sign the treaty; when he signed the document, the tormented president uttered the well-known words:

Let the hand wither that signs this monstrous treaty!

The treaty was signed on the evening of 12 March, Moscow Time, or 1 hour on 13 March, Finnish time. The protocol appended to the treaty stipulated that the fighting should end at noon, Leningrad time (11:00 Finnish time), and the fighting continued until then.

Finland ceded approximately half of Finnish Karelia, exceeding the amount of territory demanded by the Soviets before the war. The ceded area included Finland's industrial centre, the city of Viipuri (Finland's second-largest city [Population Register] or fourth-largest city [Church and Civil Register], depending on the census data), Käkisalmi, Sortavala, Suojärvi, and the whole of Viipuri Bay (with its islands). Much of this territory was still held by the Finnish Army. Military troops and remaining civilians were hastily evacuated inside the new border: 422,000 Finns, i.e. 12% of Finland's population, left their homes.

There was also an area that the Russians captured during the war that remained in Finnish hands according to the treaty: Petsamo. The treaty also stipulated that Finland would grant free passage for Soviet civilians through Petsamo to Norway.

Finland also had to cede a part of the Salla area, the Finnish part of the Kalastajansaarento (Rybachi) Peninsula in the Barents Sea, and in the Gulf of Finland the islands of Suursaari, Tytärsaari, Lavansaari (now Moshchny Island о. Мощный), Peninsaari (now Maly Island, о. Малый) and Seiskari. Finally, the Hanko Peninsula was leased to the Soviet Union as a naval base for 30 years at an annual rent of 8 million marks. The total area ceded by Finland amounted to approximately 9% of its territory.

Contrary to a common belief, the Soviet troops' transfer rights by railway to the Hanko base were not granted in the peace treaty, but they were demanded on 9 July, after Sweden had acknowledged the railway transit of Wehrmacht troops to occupied Norway.

Additional demands were the handing over any equipment and installations on the territories that were ceded. Thus Finland had to hand over 75 locomotives, 2,000 railroad cars, and a number of cars, trucks and ships. The Enso industrial area, which was clearly on the Finnish side of the border, as it was drawn in the peace treaty, was also soon added to the Finnish losses of territory and equipment.

== Aftermath ==
The Winter War and the subsequent peace treaty were core factors in leading to what would become the Continuation War, when hostilities resumed in 1941.

== See also ==
- Treaty of Tartu – 1920 border treaty between Finland and Soviet Russia
- Interim Peace – 1940–1941 interwar period in Finland
- Moscow Armistice – 1944 peace treaty between the USSR and Finland which ended the Continuation War
