= Ohto Manninen =

Finnish historian

Ohto Heikki Sulevi Manninen (24 March 1943 in Helsinki), is a Finnish historian, PhD 1977. Manninen was 1984–95 associate professor at Helsinki University, 1995–98 professor of Finland's history at Tampere University. In 1998 he became professor in the history of war at the academy of military science.

Ohto Manninen has focused foremost on Second World War history, and this has resulted in books like Toteutumaton valtioliitto (1977), which treats Finland and Sweden after the Winter War, Suur-Suomen ääriviivat (1980), which is about Finland's politics on Germany 1941, and Talvisodan salatut taustat (1994), a survey on the Soviet plans of operations before the Winter war, and collections of articles Molotovin cocktail – Hitlerin sateenvarjo (1994) and Stalinin kiusa – Himmlerin täi (2002).

== Publications ==
- Manninen, Ohto (1994). Talvisodan salatut taustat (in Finnish). Helsinki: Kirjaneuvos. ISBN 952-9052-51-0.
- Manninen, Ohto (2002). Stalinin kiusa – Himmlerin täi (in Finnish). Helsinki: Edita. ISBN 978-951-37-3694-1.
- Manninen, Ohto (2008). Miten Suomi valloitetaan : Puna-armeijan operaatiosuunnitelmat 1939-1944 (in Finnish). Helsinki: Edita. ISBN 978-951-37-5278-1.
