= Interim Peace =

1940–1941 interwar period in Finland

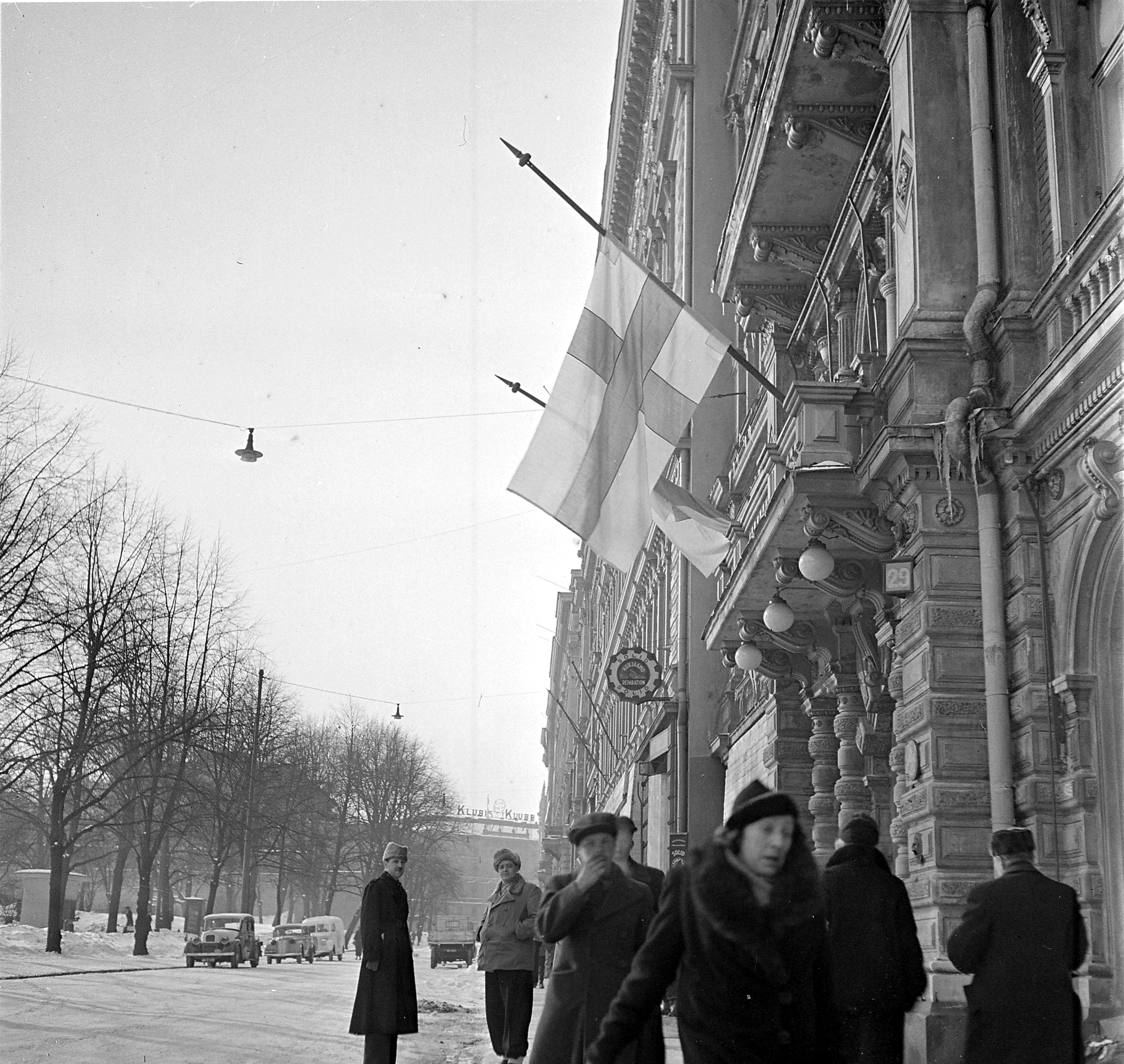
Finnish flags at half-mast after the publication of Winter War peace terms.

The Interim Peace (Finnish: Välirauha, Swedish: Mellanfreden) was a short period in the history of Finland during the Second World War. The term is used for the time between the Winter War and the Continuation War, lasting a little over 15 months, from 13 March 1940 to 24 June 1941. The Moscow Peace Treaty was signed by Finland and the Soviet Union on 12 March 1940 and it ended the 105-day Winter War.

In the aftermath of the Winter War, both the Soviet Union and Finland were preparing for a new war while Stalin pressured the Finns politically. Nazi Germany occupied Denmark and Norway in April 1940 and defeated France in June 1940. Then, Stalin occupied the Baltic states. In 1941, Finland negotiated its participation in the Axis invasion of the Soviet Union.

== Background ==
=== The Molotov–Ribbentrop Pact and the Winter War ===
The 1939 Molotov–Ribbentrop Pact clarified Soviet–German relations and enabled the Soviet Union to bring pressure to bear on the small Baltic republics and Finland. The Baltic republics had to give in to Soviet demands for bases and troop transfer rights, but Finland continued to refuse. As diplomatic pressure had failed, arms were resorted to, and on 30 November 1939 the Soviet Union began the Winter War, an invasion of Finland.

The Winter War produced in Finns a rude awakening to international politics. Condemnation by the League of Nations and by countries all over the world seemed to have no effect on Stalin's policy. Sweden allowed volunteers to join the Finnish Army, but did not send military support, and refused passage to French or British troops—which were in any event made ready in lower numbers than promised. Even right-wing extremists were shocked to find that Nazi Germany did not help at all, and also blocked material help from other countries.

The Moscow Peace Treaty, which ended the Winter War on 12 March 1940, was perceived as a great injustice. It seemed as if the losses at the negotiation table, including Viipuri (Finland's second-largest city [Population Register] or fourth-largest city [Church and Civil Register], depending on the census data), had been worse than on the battlefield. A fifth of the country's industrial capacity and 9% of its territory were lost. Of the 12% of Finland's population who lived in the lost territories, only a few hundred stayed, the remaining 420,000 moving to the Finnish side of the new border.

== After the Moscow Peace Treaty ==
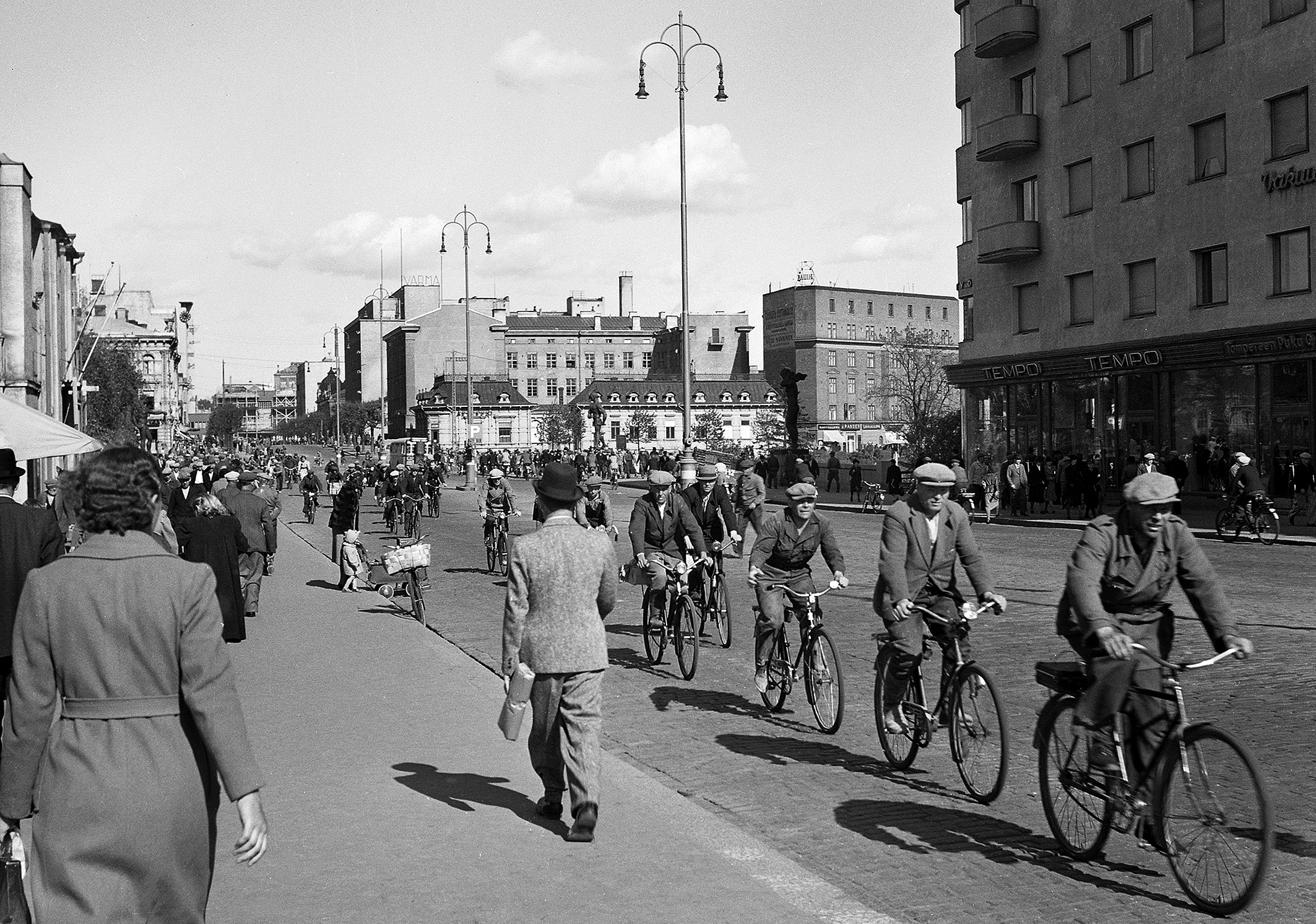
Traffic on Hämeenkatu during the interim peace in June 1940

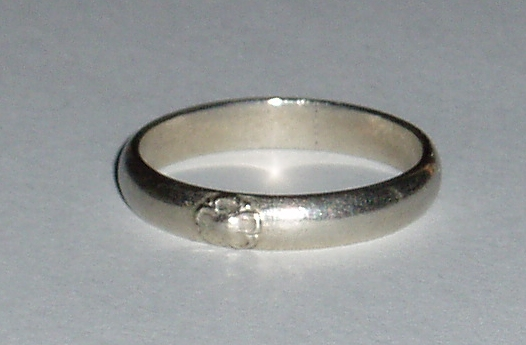
An iron ring is a ring that a Finn received in exchange for donating his gold ring to purchase military equipment for Finland fighting the Winter War, and especially for the needs of air defense after the Moscow peace. About 315,000 Finns exchanged their gold rings for "iron rings".

The Moscow Peace Treaty, signed on 12 March 1940, was a shock for the Finns. It was perceived as the ultimate failure of Finland's 1930s foreign policy, which had been based on multilateral guarantees for support from similar countries, first in the world order established by the League of Nations, and later from the Oslo group and Scandinavia. The immediate response was to broaden and intensify this policy. Binding bilateral treaties were now sought where Finland formerly had relied on goodwill and national friendship, and formerly frosty relations with ideological adversaries, such as the Soviet Union and the Third Reich, had necessarily to be eased.

Closer and improved relations were sought particularly with:

- Sweden and Norway
- the United Kingdom
- the Soviet Union
- the Third Reich

With exception for the case of Nazi Germany, all of these attempts turned out to meet critical obstacles—either due to Moscow's fear that Finland would slide out of the Soviet sphere of influence or due to general dynamics of the world war.

=== Reaction in Finland ===
Public opinion in Finland longed for the re-acquisition of the homes of the 12% of Finland's population who had been forced to leave Finnish Karelia in haste, and put their hope in the peace conference that was generally assumed would follow the World War. The term Välirauha ("Interim peace") hence became popular after the harsh peace was announced.

To protest the Moscow Peace Treaty, two ministers resigned and Prime Minister Ryti was forced to form a new cabinet right away. To achieve better national consensus, all parties except the right extremist IKL participated in the cabinet.

The most difficult post to fill was that of Foreign Minister, for which Ryti and Mannerheim first thought of Finland's ambassador to London G. A. Gripenberg, but as he believed himself to be too unpopular in Berlin, Rolf Witting, who was less British-oriented and more suitable to achieve improved relations with Nazi Germany and the Soviet Union, was selected.

=== Attempted Nordic Defence Alliance ===
During the last days of war, Väinö Tanner and Per Albin Hansson had mentioned the possibility of a Nordic Defence Alliance, possibly including also Norway and Denmark, to stabilize the situation in the region. On 15 March this plan was published for discussion in the parliaments. However, on 29 March the Soviet Union declared that an alliance would be in breach of the Moscow Peace Treaty, which stalled the plan, and Germany's invasion of Denmark and Norway killed even the option of a smaller Scandinavian defence union, which would have benefited Finland even if it were not a party to it.

=== Re-armaments ===
Although the peace treaty was signed, the state of war was not revoked because of the widening world war, the difficult food supply situation, and the poor shape of the Finnish military. Censorship was not abolished and was used to suppress critics of the Moscow Peace Treaty and the most blatantly anti-Soviet comments.

The continued state of war made it possible for President Kyösti Kallio to ask Field Marshal Mannerheim to remain commander-in-chief and supervise the reorganization of Finland's armed forces and the fortification of the new border, a task that was critically important in the unruly times. Within a week after the peace treaty was signed, the fortification works were started along the 1200 km long Salpalinja ("the Bolt Line"), where the focus was between the Gulf of Finland and Lake Saimaa.

During the summer and autumn, Finland received material purchased and donated during and immediately after the Winter War, but it took several months before Mannerheim was able to present a somewhat positive assessment of the state of the army. Military expenditures rose in 1940 to 45% of Finland's state budget. Military purchases were prioritised over civilian needs. Mannerheim's position and the continued state of war enabled an efficient management of the military, but it created an unfortunate parallel government that from time to time clashed with the structures of the civilian government.

On 13 March, the same day that the Moscow Peace Treaty came into effect, the British Ministry of Economic Warfare (MEW) asked the Foreign Office to start negotiations with Finland as soon as possible to secure positive relations with Finland. The under-secretary of MEW, Charles Hambro was authorized to form the war trade treaty with Finland, and he travelled to Helsinki on 7 April. He had already exchanged letters with Ryti, and they quickly reached a basic understanding of the contents of the treaty. The Finns were eager to start trade and from the first meeting the preliminary treaty was created, which Finns accepted immediately; but Hambro needed the approval of his superiors and stressed that the treaty would not be considered official until the final version was negotiated. In the treaty Finland gave control of her strategic material exports to Britain in exchange for armaments and other necessary materials. However, the next day, Germany attacked Norway, making the treaty unworkable due to the lack of safe trade routes between the two countries.

== Foreign relations ==
=== Denmark and Norway occupied ===
After Nazi Germany's assault on Scandinavia on 9 April 1940, Operation Weserübung, Finland was physically isolated from her traditional trade markets in the west. Sea routes to and from Finland were now controlled by the Kriegsmarine. The outlet of the Baltic sea was blockaded, and in the far north Finland's route to the world was an Arctic dirt road from Rovaniemi to the ice-free harbour of Petsamo, from where the ships had to pass a long stretch of German-occupied Norwegian coast by the Arctic Ocean. Finland, like Sweden, was spared occupation but encircled by Nazi Germany and Soviet Union. With direct support by Marshal Mannerheim a volunteer unit was formed and sent to Norway to help the fight against the Nazi army. The ambulance unit participated in the war until the Germans conquered the area in which it was serving. The volunteers returned to Finland.

Especially damaging was the loss of fertilizer imports, that, together with the loss of arable land ceded in the Moscow Peace, the loss of cattle during the hasty evacuation after the Winter War, and the unfavourable weather in the summer of 1940, resulted in a drastic fall of foodstuff production to less than two thirds of what was Finland's estimated need. Some of the deficit could be purchased from Sweden and some from the Soviet Union, although delayed deliveries were then a means to exert pressure on Finland. In this situation, Finland had no alternative but to turn to Germany for help.

=== Finland seeks German rapprochement ===
Germany had traditionally been a counterweight to Russia in the Baltic region, and despite the fact that Hitler's Third Reich had acquiesced with the invader, Finland perceived some value in also seeking warmer relations in that direction. After the German occupation of Norway, and particularly after the Allied evacuation from northern Norway, the relative importance of a German rapprochement increased. Finland had queried about the possibility of buying arms from Germany on 9 May, but Germany refused to even discuss the matter.

From May 1940, Finland pursued a campaign to re-establish the good relations with Germany that had soured in the last year of the 1930s. Finland rested her hope in the fragility of the Nazi–Soviet bond, and in the many personal friendships between Finnish and German athletes, scientists, industrialists, and military officers. A part of that policy was accrediting the energetic former Prime Minister Toivo Mikael Kivimäki as ambassador in Berlin in June 1940. The Finnish mass media not only refrained from criticism of Nazi Germany, but also took active part in this campaign. Dissent was censored. Seen from Berlin, this looked like a refreshing contrast to the annoyingly anti-Nazi press in Sweden.

After the fall of France, in June 1940, the Finnish ambassador in Stockholm heard from the diplomatic sources that Britain could soon be forced to negotiate peace with Germany. The experience from World War I emphasized the importance of close and friendly relations with the victors, and accordingly the courting of Nazi Germany was stepped up still further.

The first crack in the German coldness towards Finland was registered in late July, when Ludwig Weissauer, a secret representative of the German Foreign Minister, visited Finland and queried Mannerheim and Ryti about Finland's willingness to defend the country against the Soviet Union. Mannerheim estimated the Finnish Army could last a few weeks without more arms. Weissauer left without any promises.

=== Continued Soviet pressure ===
The implementation of the Moscow Peace Treaty created problems due to the Soviet Vae Victis-mentality. Border arrangements in the Enso industrial area, which even Soviet members of the border commission considered to be on the Finnish side of the border, the forced return of evacuated machinery, locomotives, and rail cars; and inflexibility on questions which could have eased hardships created by the new border, such as fishing rights and the usage of Saimaa Canal merely served to heighten distrust about the objectives of the Soviet Union.

The Soviet attitude was personified in the new ambassador to Helsinki, Ivan Zotov. He behaved undiplomatically and had a stiff-necked drive to advance Soviet interests, real or imagined, in Finland. During the summer and autumn he recommended several times in his reports to the Soviet Foreign Office that Finland ought to be finished off and wholly annexed by the Soviet Union.

On 14 June Soviet bombers shot down the Finnish passenger plane Kaleva, while en route from Tallinn to Helsinki. All nine passengers and crew perished.

On 23 June the Soviet Union proposed that Finland should revoke Petsamo mining rights from the British–Canadian company and transfer them to the Soviet Union, or to a joint venture owned by the Soviets and the Finns. On 27 June Moscow demanded either demilitarization or a joint fortification effort in Åland. After Sweden had signed the troop transfer agreement with Germany on 8 July, Soviet Foreign Minister Molotov demanded similar rights for a Soviet troop transit to Hanko on 9 July. The transfer rights were given on 6 September, and demilitarization of Åland was agreed on 11 October, but negotiations on Petsamo continued to drag on, with Finnish negotiators stalling as much as possible.

The Communist Party was so discredited in the Winter War that it never managed to recuperate between the wars. Instead, on 22 May, the Peace and Friendship Society of Finland and Soviet Union was created, and it actively propagated Soviet viewpoints. Ambassador Zotov had very close contacts with the Society by holding weekly meetings with the Society leadership in the Soviet embassy and having Soviet diplomats participating in Society board meetings. The Society started by criticizing the government and military, and gained around 35,000 members at maximum. Emboldened by its success, it started organizing almost daily violent demonstrations during the first half of August which were supported politically by Zotov and a press campaign in Leningrad. The government reacted forcefully and arrested leading members of the society which ended the demonstrations in spite of Zotov's and Molotov's protests. The Society was finally outlawed in December 1940.

The Soviet Union demanded that Väinö Tanner be discharged from the cabinet because of his anti-Soviet stance and he had to resign on 15 August. Ambassador Zotov further demanded the resignation of both the Minister of Social Affairs Karl-August Fagerholm because he had called the Society a fifth column in a public speech, and the Minister of Interior Affairs Ernst von Born, who was responsible for police and led the crackdown of the Society, but they retained their places in the cabinet after Ryti delivered a radio speech in which he stated the willingness of his government to improve relations between Finland and the Soviet Union.

President Kallio suffered a stroke on 28 August, after which he was unable to work, but when he presented his resignation on 27 November the Soviet Union reacted by announcing that if Mannerheim, Tanner, Kivimäki, Svinhufvud or someone of their ilk were chosen president, it would be considered a breach of the Moscow peace treaty.

All of this reminded the public heavily of how the Baltic Republics had been occupied and annexed only a few months earlier. It was no wonder that the average Finn feared that the Winter War had produced only a short delay of the same fate.

=== British policy change ===
Compared to the early spring, during the summer of 1940, British foreign policy looked to gain some support from the Soviet Union, so the new Britain government under Churchill appointed Sir Stafford Cripps, from the left wing of the Labour Party, as ambassador to Moscow. He had openly supported the Terijoki Government during the Winter War and he wondered to Ambassador Paasikivi 'didn't the Finns really want to follow Baltic Republics and join the Soviet Union?'. He also dismissively called President Kallio "Kulak" and Nordic social democracy "reactionary". However, his opinions were not shared by the British Foreign Office, which apologized for his language to Ambassador Gripenberg.

During the nickel negotiations the Foreign Office pressured the license owning British-Canadian company to "temporarily" release the license and offered diplomatic support to Soviet attempts to gain control of the mine with the precondition that no ore would be shipped to Germany.

=== Improved relations with Nazi Germany ===
Unbeknownst to Finland, Adolf Hitler had started to plan his forthcoming invasion of the Soviet Union (Operation Barbarossa) now that France had collapsed. He had not been interested in Finland before the Winter War, but now he saw the value of Finland as an operating base, and perhaps also the military value of the Finnish Army. In the first weeks of August 1940, German fears of a likely immediate Soviet attack on Finland caused Hitler to free the arms embargo. The arms deliveries, which were stopped under the Winter War, were now resumed.

The next visitor from Germany came on 18 August, when a representative of Hermann Göring, arms dealer Joseph Veltjens, arrived. He negotiated with Ryti and Mannerheim about German troop transfer rights between Finnmark in Northern Norway and ports of Gulf of Bothnia in exchange for arms and other material. At first these arms shipments were transferred via Sweden, but later they came directly to Finland. For the Third Reich, this was a breach of the Molotov–Ribbentrop Pact, as well as being for Finland a material breach of the Moscow Peace Treaty—that in fact had been chiefly targeted against cooperation between Germany and Finland. It has been disputed in retrospect whether the ailing President Kallio was informed. Possibly Kallio's health collapsed before he could be confidentially briefed.

From the campaign to ease the Third Reich's coldness towards Finland, it seemed a natural development to also promote closer relations and cooperation, especially since the much-disliked Moscow Peace Treaty had, in clear language, tried to persuade the Finns not to do exactly that. Propaganda in the censored press contributed to Finland's international re-orientation—although with very measured means.

Soviet negotiators had insisted that the troop transfer agreement (to Hanko) should not be published for parliamentary discussion or voting. This precedent made it easy for the Finnish government to keep a troop transfer agreement with the Germans secret until the first German troops arrived at the port of Vaasa on 21 September. The arrival of German troops produced much relief to the insecurity of average Finns, and was largely approved. Most contrary voices opposed more the way the agreement was negotiated than the transfer itself, although the Finnish people knew only the barest details of the agreements with the Third Reich. The presence of German troops was seen as a deterrent for further Soviet threats and a counterbalance to the Soviet troop transfer right. The German troop transfer agreement was augmented on 21 November, allowing the transfer of wounded, and soldiers on leave, via Turku. Germans arrived and established quarters, depots, and bases along the rail lines from Vaasa and Oulu to Ylitornio and Rovaniemi, and from there along the roads via Karesuvanto and Kilpisjärvi or Ivalo and Petsamo to Skibotn and Kirkenes in northern Norway. Also roadworks for improving winter road (between Karesuvanto and Skibotn) and totally new road (between Ivalo and Karasjok) were discussed, and later financed, by Germans.

Ryti, Mannerheim, Minister of Defence Walden and chief of staff Heinrichs decided on 23 October that information concerning Finnish defence plans of Lapland could be given to the Wehrmacht to gain goodwill, even with the risk that they could be forwarded to the Soviet Union.

When Soviet Foreign Minister Molotov visited Berlin on 12 November, he demanded that Germany stop supporting Finland, and the right to handle Finland in a similar way to Baltic states, but Hitler demanded that there should be no new military activities in Northern Europe before summer. Through unofficial channels, Finnish representatives were informed that "Finnish leaders can sleep peacefully, Hitler has opened his umbrella over Finland."

=== Attempted defence union with Sweden ===
On 19 August a new initiative was launched for co-operation between Sweden and Finland. It called for a union of the two states in exchange for a Finnish declaration of satisfaction with the current borders. The plans were primarily championed by the Swedish Foreign Minister, Christian Günther, and Conservative party leader Gösta Bagge, Education Minister in Stockholm. They had to counter increasing anti-Swedish opinions in Finland; and in Sweden, Liberal and Socialist suspicions against what was seen as right-wing dominance in Finland. One of the chief objectives of the plan was to ensure greatest possible liberty for Sweden and Finland in a presumed post-war Europe totally dominated by Nazi Germany. In Sweden, political opponents criticized the necessary adaptations to the Nazis; in Finland, the resistance centred on the loss of sovereignty and influence—and the acceptance of the loss of Finnish Karelia. However, the general feeling of Finland's dire and deteriorating position quieted many critics.

The official request for a union was made by Christian Günther on 18 October, and Finland's approval was received on 25 October, but by 5 November the Soviet ambassador in Stockholm, Alexandra Kollontai, warned Sweden about the treaty. The Swedish government retreated from the issue but discussions for a more acceptable treaty continued until December when, on 6 December, the Soviet Union and, on 19 December Germany announced their strong opposition to any kind of union between Sweden and Finland.

== Road to war ==
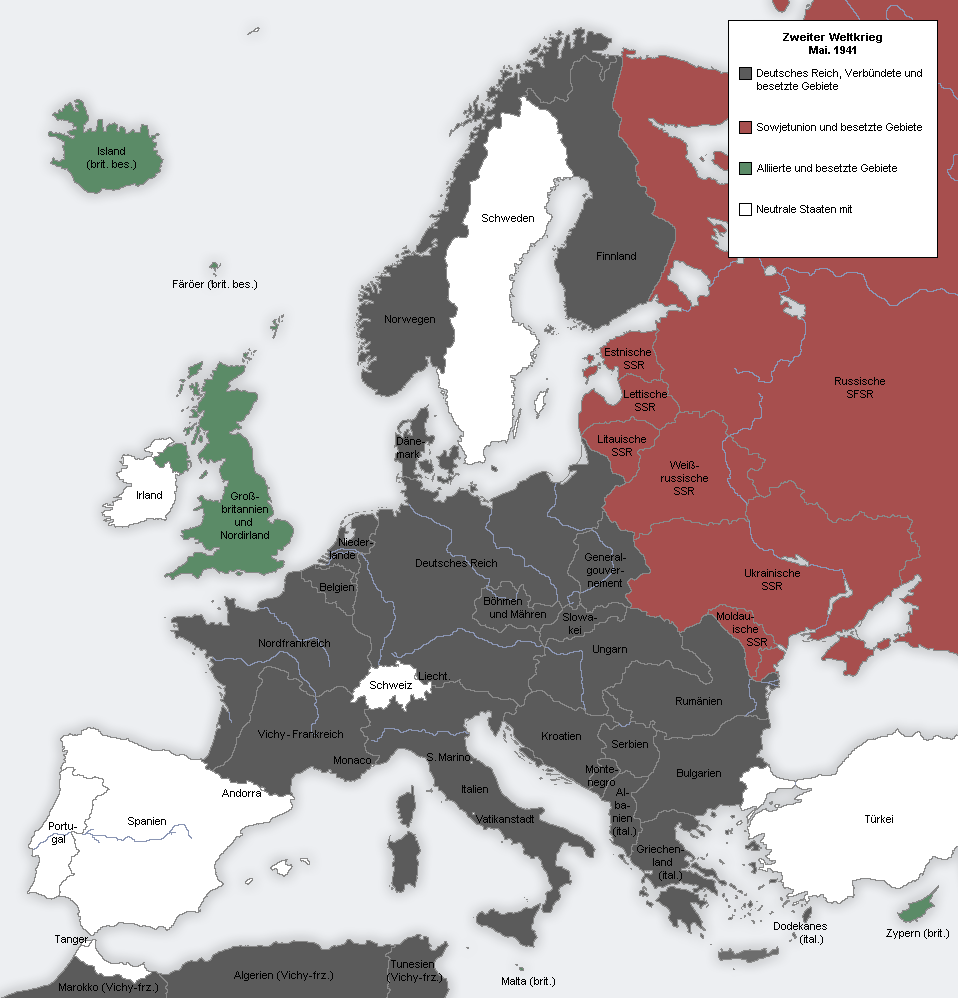
Situation in Europe by May/June 1941, immediately before Operation Barbarossa

At the autumn of 1940, Finnish generals visited Germany and German occupied Europe several times to purchase additional material, guns and munition. Mannerheim even wrote a personal letter on 7 January 1941 to Göring, on which he tried to persuade him to release Finnish purchased artillery pieces Germany had captured in Norwegian harbours during Weserübung. During one of these visits, Major General Paavo Talvela met with Chief of Staff of OKH, Col. Gen Franz Halder and Göring on 15–18 January 1941, and was asked about Finnish plans to defend itself in case of new Soviet invasion. The Germans also inquired about the possibility of someone from Finland coming and giving a presentation about the experiences of the Winter War.

After the resignation of president Kallio, Risto Ryti was elected by parliament as the new president of Finland on 19 December. Johan Wilhelm Rangell formed a new government on 4 January, and this time the far-right IKL party was included in the cabinet as an act of goodwill toward Nazi Germany.

=== Petsamo Crisis ===
Finland had negotiated with the Germans since the spring of 1940 about the production of Kolosjoki nickel mines in Petsamo. In July 1940 Finland made a contract with the German company I.G. Farbenindustrie: 60% of the nickel produced was to be shipped to Germany. The negotiations alarmed the Soviet Union, which in June asked for 75% ownership of the mine and a nearby power plant together with the right to handle security in the area.

According to German reports, the ore body of Kolosjoki mines had a value of over 1 billion Reichsmark, and it could fulfil the demand for nickel in the Third Reich for 20 years. Later on, at the end of 1940, the Germans raised their estimate of the Kolosjoki nickel reserves four times larger.

Negotiations with the Soviet Union had dragged on for six months when the Soviet Foreign Ministry announced, on 14 January 1941, that the negotiations had to be concluded quickly. On the same day, the Soviet Union interrupted grain deliveries to Finland. Soviet ambassador Zotov was recalled home on 18 January and Soviet radio broadcasts started attacking Finland. On 21 January 1941 the Soviet Foreign Ministry issued an ultimatum demanding that nickel negotiations be concluded in two days.

When Finnish military intelligence spotted troop movements on the Soviet side of the border, Mannerheim proposed, on 23 January 1941, a partial mobilization, but Ryti and Rangell didn't accept. Ambassador Kivimäki reported on 24 January 1941 that Germany was conscripting new age classes, and it was unlikely that they were needed against Britain.

Finnish Chief of Staff Lt. Gen. Heinrichs visited Berlin on 30 January–3 February, officially giving a lecture about Finnish experiences in the Winter War, but also including discussions with Halder. During the discussions Halder speculated about a possible German assault on the Soviet Union and Heinrichs informed him about Finnish mobilization limits and defence plans with and without German or Swedish participation.

Col. Buschenhagen had reported from northern Norway on 1 February that the Soviet Union had collected 500 fishing ships in Murmansk, capable of transporting a division. Hitler ordered troops in Norway to occupy Petsamo (Operation Rentier) immediately if the Soviet Union started attacking Finland.

Mannerheim submitted his letter of resignation on 10 February, claiming that the continuing appeasement made it impossible to defend the country against an invader. He took his resignation back the next day after discussions with Ryti and after stricter instructions were sent to negotiators: 49% of mining rights to the Soviet Union, the power plant to a separate Finnish company, reservation of the highest management positions for Finns and no further Soviet agitation against Finland. The Soviet Union rejected those terms on 18 February, thus ending nickel negotiations.

=== Diplomatic activities ===
After Heinrichs' visit and the end of the nickel negotiations, diplomatic activities were halted for a few months. The most significant activities of that time was the visit of Colonel Buschenhagen to Helsinki and Northern Finland on 18 February – 3 March, when he familiarized himself with the terrain and climate of Lappland. He also had discussions with Mannerheim, Heinrichs, Major General Airo and chief-of-operational-office Colonel Tapola. Both sides were careful to point out the speculative nature of these discussions, although later they became the basis of formal agreements.

Already in December 1940, leaders of Germany's Waffen-SS had demanded that Finland should show its orientation towards Germany "with deeds", by which it was clear that it meant enlistment of Finnish troops to the SS. The official contact was made on 1 March, and in the following negotiations the Finns tried in vain to transform the troops from SS to Wehrmacht, in commemoration of the World War I-era Finnish Jäger Battalion. Ryti and Mannerheim considered the battalion necessary to reinforce German support of Finland, thence the nickname "Panttipataljoona" ("Pawn battalion"), and the negotiations were concluded on 28 April with the Finnish conditions that Government, Civil Guards or Armed Forces would not enlist and that all military personnel wishing to participate must first take their leave of the Finnish Army. (These conditions were designed to limit Finnish commitment to Nazi Germany.) The enlistment was carried out in May, and in June the troops were transferred to Germany where a Finnish SS battalion was founded on 18 June. Foreign minister Witting informed Sweden, where similar activities were also conducted, already on 23 March about possible enlistment. The British ambassador to Helsinki, Gordon Vereker, notified the Finnish Foreign Ministry on 16 May of the issue, demanding an end to the enlistment.

Relations between Sweden and Germany strained in March, and on 15 March Sweden mobilized 80,000 more men and moved military units to the southern coast and western border making it even more likely that Sweden couldn't support Finland if war broke out. This also affected Swedish-Finnish co-operation as the Finnish interest for intelligence exchange diminished considerably during April.

Race issues were sources of particular concern: the Finns were not viewed favourably by the Nazi race theorists. By active participation on Germany's side, Finnish leaders hoped for a more independent position in post-war Europe, through the removal of the Soviet threat and the incorporation of the related Finnish peoples of neighbouring Soviet areas, especially Karelia. This view gained increasing popularity in the Finnish leadership, and also in the press, during the spring of 1941.

From February to April, Germany prepared Barbarossa in secret, and apart from the above contacts, no operational or political discussions were concluded during this time. Instead they published disinformation, such as claims that the German troop buildup in the East was merely a ruse ahead of a planned invasion of Britain (such a plan had been considered under the codename Operation Sea Lion) or safe training locations from British bombers, to hide their real intentions. When Germany invaded Yugoslavia and Greece beginning on 6 April, suspicion of German intentions increased in Finland, though uncertainty still prevailed as to whether Hitler really intended to attack the Soviet Union before the Battle of Britain was concluded.

However, the Finns had, in the past, learned bitterly how a small country can be used as small change in the deals of great powers, and in such a case Finland could have been used as a token of reconciliation between Hitler and Stalin, something which the Finns had every reason to fear, which is why relations with Berlin were considered of the utmost priority for the future of Finland, especially so if the war between Germany and Soviet Union failed to materialize.

Once again the German Foreign Ministry sent Ludwig Weissauer to Finland on 5 May, this time to clarify that war between Germany and the Soviet Union would not be launched before spring 1942. Ryti and Witting believed that, at least officially, and forwarded the message to Swedish Foreign Minister Günther, who was visiting Finland on 6–9 May. Witting also sent the information to Finnish-ambassador-to-London Gripenberg. When the war broke out only a couple of weeks later, it was understandable that both Swedish and British governments felt that the Finns had lied to them.

Part of that disinformation campaign was a request to ambassador Kivimäki that Finland should offer proposals for a new border that the Germans could pressure the Soviets to accept in negotiations. On 30 May 1941 General Airo produced five alternative border drafts for delivery to the Germans, who should then propose the best they felt they could bargain from the Soviet Union. In reality, the Germans had no such intentions, but the exercise served to fuel the support among leading Finns for taking part in Operation Barbarossa.

Operations like Barbarossa don't begin without some advance notice, and worsening of Soviet-German relations, which began with the meeting in Berlin on 12 November, was visible around the end of March 1941. Stalin tried to improve relations toward the Third Reich by taking the leadership of the Soviet government on 6 May, backed off from unimportant issues, and fulfilled all trade deals even as German deliveries were late. Part of this policy was also improving relations with Finland. A new ambassador, Pavel Orlov, was named to Helsinki on 23 April and a gift of a trainload of wheat was presented to J. K. Paasikivi when he retired from Moscow. The Soviet Union also renounced opposition to a Swedish-Finnish defence alliance, but Swedish disinterest and German opposition to that kind of alliance rendered the proposal moot. Soviet radio propaganda against Finland also ceased. Orlov acted very conciliatory and soothed many feelings which had been raised by his predecessor, but as he failed to solve any critical issues (like the disagreement over Petsamo nickel) or to restart grain imports from Soviet Union, his line was seen only as a new facade on old policy.

British-ambassador-Vereker saw Finland moving towards Germany, and due to his reports, the British Foreign Office had requested easing Finnish trade regulations in Petsamo on 30 March. On 28 April Vereker reported that the British government should pressure the Soviet Union to return Hanko or Vyborg to Finland as he saw it as the only possible way to secure Finnish neutrality in the case of German-Soviet war.

The Petsamo crisis had disillusioned Finnish politicians, especially Ryti and Mannerheim, creating the impression that peaceful co-existence with the Soviet Union was impossible, and that Finland would survive in peace only if the Soviet Union was defeated, as Ryti presented it to US ambassador Arthur Schoenfeld on 28 April. The effect of this general feeling was that voices advocating closer ties with Germany grew stronger and the voices advocating armed neutrality within Finland's new borders (some among the Social Democrats, and some of the more left-leaning in the Swedish People's Party) softened. Contacts with Sweden's Conservative Foreign Minister Günther showed an enthusiasm unusual for the Swedes for the anticipated "Crusade against Bolshevism".

After the successful occupation of Yugoslavia and Greece by the spring of 1941, the German army's standing was at its zenith, and its victory in the war seemed more than likely. The envoy of the German Foreign Ministry, Karl Schnurre, visited Finland on 20–24 May, and invited one or more staff officers to negotiations in Salzburg.

=== Cooperation with Germany ===
A group of staff officers led by General Heinrichs left Finland on 24 May and participated in discussions with OKW in Salzburg on 25 May, when the Germans informed them about the northern part of Operation Barbarossa. The Germans also presented their interest in using Finnish territory to attack from Petsamo to Murmansk and from Salla to Kandalaksha. Heinrichs presented Finnish interest in Eastern Karelia, but Germany recommended a passive stance. The negotiations continued the next day in Berlin with OKH, and contrary to the negotiations of the previous day, Germany wanted Finland to form a strong attack formation ready to strike on the eastern or western side of Lake Ladoga. The Finns promised to examine the proposal, but notified the Germans that they were only able to arrange supply to the Olonets-Petrozavodsk-line. The issue of mobilization was also discussed. It was decided that the Germans would send signal officers to enable confidential messaging to Mannerheim's headquarters in Mikkeli. Naval issues were discussed, mainly for securing sea lines over the Baltic Sea, but also possible usage of the Finnish navy in the upcoming war. During these negotiations the Finns presented a number of material requests ranging from grain and fuel to airplanes and radio equipment.

Heinrichs' group returned on 28 May and reported their discussions to Mannerheim, Walden and Ryti. And on 30 May Ryti, Witting, Walden, Kivimäki, Mannerheim, Heinrichs, Talvela and Aaro Pakaslahti from Foreign Ministry had a meeting where they accepted the results of those negotiations with a list of some prerequisites: a guarantee of Finnish independence, the pre-Winter War borders (or better), continuing grain deliveries, and that Finnish troops would not cross the border before a Soviet incursion.

The next round of negotiations occurred in Helsinki on 3–6 June regarding some practical details. During these negotiations it was decided that Germany would be responsible for the area north of Oulu. This area was easily given to them because it was sparsely inhabited and not critical to the defence of the more important southern provinces. The Finns also agreed to give two divisions to the Germans in northern Finland (30 000 men) and to the usage of airfields in Helsinki and Kemijärvi (Because of the number of German aircraft, airfields at Kemi and Rovaniemi were added later). Finland also warned Germany that an attempt to establish a Quisling government would end co-operation as they considered it very important that Finland not be the aggressor and that no invasion should be launched from Finnish soil.

The negotiations for naval operations continued on 6 June in Kiel. It was agreed that the Kriegsmarine would close the Gulf of Finland with mines as soon as the war began.

The arrival of German troops participating in Operation Barbarossa began on 7 June in Petsamo, where SS Division Nord started southwards, and on 8 June in the ports of the Gulf of Bothnia where the German 169th Infantry Division was transported by rail to Rovaniemi, where both of these turned eastward on 18 June. Britain cancelled all naval traffic to Petsamo from 14 June in protest against these moves. Starting from 14 June, a number of German minelayers and supporting MTBs arrived in Finland, some on an official naval visit, others hiding in the southern archipelago.

Finnish parliament was informed for the first time on 9 June, when first mobilization orders were issued for troops needed to safeguard the following mobilization phases, like anti-air and border guard units. The Committee on Foreign Affairs complained that parliament was bypassed when deciding on these issues, and protesting that Parliament should be trusted with sensitive information, but no other actions were taken. Swedish ambassador Karl-Ivan Westman wrote that the Soviet-minded "Sextuples", the far-left Social Democrats, were the reason that parliament couldn't be trusted in foreign policy questions. When Soviet news agency TASS reported on 13 June that no negotiations were ongoing between Germany and the Soviet Union, Ryti and Mannerheim decided to delay mobilization as no guarantees had been received from Germany. General Waldemar Erfurt, who had been nominated as liaison officer to Finland on 11 June, reported to OKW on 14 June that Finland wouldn't finalize mobilization unless the prerequisites were granted. Although the Finns continued on the same day (14 June) with the second phase of mobilization, this time the mobilizing forces were located in northern Finland and later operated under German command. Field Marshal Keitel sent a message on 15 June stating that the Finnish prerequisites were accepted, and the general mobilization restarted on 17 June, two days later than scheduled. On 16 June two Finnish divisions were transferred to the German army in Lapland.

An airfield in Utti was evacuated by Finnish planes on 18 June and the Germans were allowed to use it for refuelling from 19 June. German reconnaissance planes were stationed at Tikkakoski, near Jyväskylä, on 20 June.

On 20 June Finland's government ordered 45,000 people at the Soviet border to be evacuated. On 21 June Finland's chief of the General Staff, Erik Heinrichs, was finally informed by his German counterpart that the attack was to begin.

=== To the opening of hostilities ===
Operation Barbarossa had already commenced in the northern Baltic by the late hours of 21 June, when German minelayers, which had been hiding in the Finnish archipelago, laid two large minefields across the Gulf of Finland, one at the mouth of the Gulf and a second in the middle of the Gulf.

These minefields ultimately proved sufficient to confine the Soviets' Baltic Fleet to the easternmost part of the Gulf of Finland until the end of the Continuation War. Three Finnish submarines participated in the mining operation by laying 9 small fields between Suursaari Island and the Estonian coast with first mines being laid at 0738 on 22 June 1941 by Finnish submarine Vetehinen.

Later the same night, German bombers, flying from East Prussian airfields, flew along the Gulf of Finland to Leningrad and mined the harbour and the river Neva. Finnish air defence noticed that one group of these bombers, most likely the ones responsible for mining the river Neva, flew over southern Finland. On the return trip, these bombers refuelled in Utti airfield before returning to East Prussia.

Finland feared that the Soviet Union would occupy Åland as soon as possible and use it to close naval routes from Finland to Sweden and Germany (together with Hanko base), so Operation Kilpapurjehdus (Sail Race) was launched in the early hours of 22 June to deliver Finnish troops to Åland. Soviet bombers launched attacks against Finnish ships during the operation at 0605 on 22 June 1941 before the Finnish ships had delivered the troops to Åland but no damage was inflicted in the air attack.

Individual Soviet artillery batteries started to shoot at Finnish positions from Hanko early in the morning, so the Finnish commander sought permission to return fire, but before the permission was granted, Soviet artillery had stopped shooting.

On the morning of 22 June, the German Gebirgskorps Norwegen started Operation Rentier and began its move from Northern Norway to Petsamo. The German ambassador initiated urgent negotiations with Sweden for transfer of the German 163rd Infantry Division from Norway to Finland using Swedish rail. Sweden agreed to this on 24 June.

On the morning of 22 June, both the Soviet Union and Finland declared that each would be neutral in respect of the other in the war that was now underway. This precipitated unease in the Nazi leadership, which tried to provoke a response from the Soviet Union by using both the Finnish archipelago as a base, and Finnish airfields for refuelling. Hitler's public statement worked in the same direction; Hitler declared that Germany would attack the Bolshevists "(...) in the North in alliance ["im Bunde"] with the Finnish freedom heroes". This was in flat contradiction of the statement made to parliament by British Foreign Secretary Eden on 24 June affirming Finnish neutrality.

Finland did not allow direct German attacks from its soil to the Soviet Union, so German forces in Petsamo and Salla had to hold their fire. Air attacks were also prohibited, and very bad weather in northern Finland helped to keep the Germans from flying. Only one attack from Southern Finland against the White Sea Canal was approved, but even that had to be cancelled due to bad weather. There were occasional individual and group level small arms shooting between Soviet and Finnish border guards, but otherwise the front was quiet.

To keep a close eye on their opponents, both parties—and also the Germans—performed active air reconnaissance over the border, but no air fights ensued.

After three days, early on the morning of 25 June the Soviet Union made its move and unleashed a major air offensive against 18 cities with 460 planes, mainly striking airfields but seriously damaging civilian targets as well. The worst damage was done in Turku, where the airfield become inoperable for a week, but among civilian targets, the medieval Turku Castle was damaged. (After the war, the castle was repaired, but the work took until 1961.) Heavy damage to civilian targets was also sustained in Kotka and Heinola. However, civilian casualties of this attack were relatively limited.

The Soviet Union justified the attack as being directed against German targets in Finland, but even the British embassy had to admit that the heaviest hits had been taken by southern Finland, and airfields where there were no Germans. Only two targets had German forces present at the time of attack: Rovaniemi and Petsamo. Once again Foreign Minister Eden had to admit to parliament on 26 June that the Soviet Union had initiated the war.

A meeting of parliament was scheduled for 25 June, when Prime Minister Rangell had been due to present a notice about Finland's neutrality in the Soviet-German war, but the Soviet bombings led him to instead observe that Finland was once again at war with the Soviet Union. The Continuation War had begun.

== See also ==
- Aftermath of the Winter War
