= Karjalan Liitto =

Finnish organization that promotes Karelian culture and history

- Karelian Association
- Formation: 20 April 1940; 86 years ago
- Purpose: Cultural institution Advocacy group
- Headquarters: Helsinki
- Location: Finland
- Origins: Local government of Finnish Karelia
- Members: 20,000 (2022)
- Chairman: Martti Talja
- Board of directors: Federal Council
- Website: https://www.karjalanliitto.fi/

Karjalan Liitto (in English: Karelian Association) is a Finnish organisation that promotes Karelian culture and history. It also functions as an interest group for Karelian evacuees. As of 2023, the organization consists of 14 districts in Finland, cooperating with other Karelian movements and organisations.

== History ==
The association was established by Karelian local governments, parishes and provincial organizations on 20 April 1940, immediately after the Winter War. The chief aim was to attend to the interests of Karelians who had lost their homes.

By the 1960s, the organization started to focus on preservation of the Karelian culture, by that point most of the economic and social problems faced by resettled Karelians were addressed.

The Karelian Association has close ties to the Finnish government and the European Union.

The organization had an official magazine Karjala Lehti, which stopped being published in September 2022, but there are plans to restart printing in 2023.

In 2023, Karjalan Liitto was contacted by a Karelian nationalist organisation, which wanted to cooperate with the movement in order to return Karelia back to Finland. The movement refused the offer, seeing it as a Russian information attack.

== Goals ==
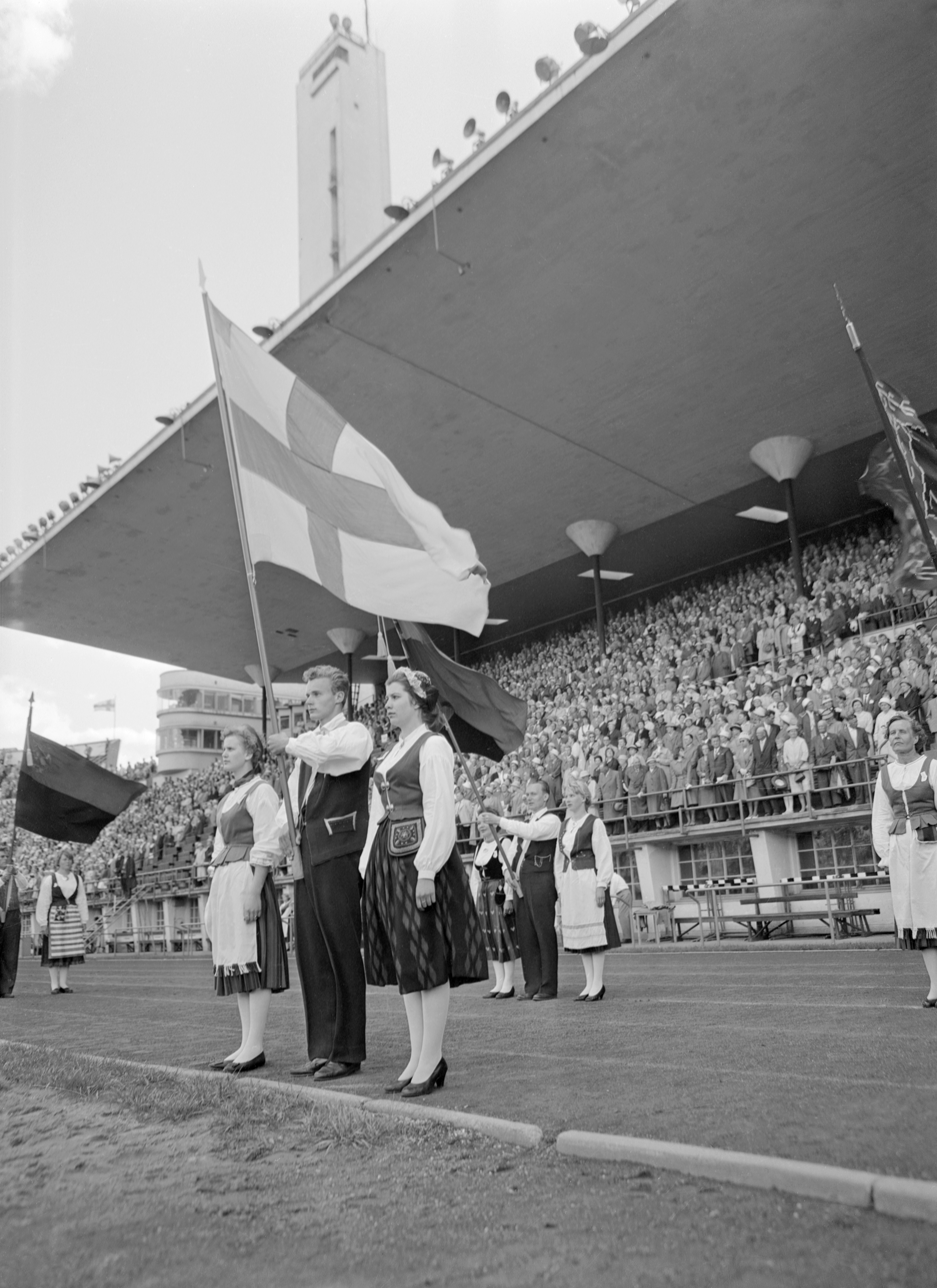
Karelians' big celebrations at the Helsinki Olympic Stadium in 1960

- Preservation of Karelian culture
- Displaying Karelian culture
- Cross border cooperation (frozen)
- Promotion of Karelianism
- Cooperation with other Karelian organizations

Some members of Karjalan Liito supported a peaceful return of Karelia, but as of 2023, the movement is against border changes with Russia.
