= Evacuation of Finnish Karelia =

Displacement of the population of Finnish Karelia

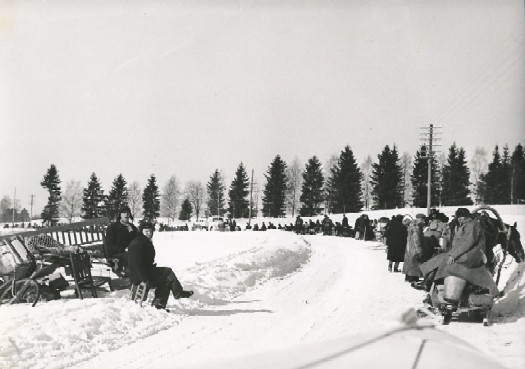
Evacuees from Muolaa municipality, Finnish Karelia, going to western Finland, beginning of the Winter War.

As a result of the 1940 Moscow Peace Treaty that concluded the Winter War, Finland ceded a portion of Finnish Karelia along with other territories to the Soviet Union. As a result, about 410,000 people, or 12% of Finland's population, were relocated to the remaining parts of Finland.

The treaty did not require Finland to empty the ceded territory, but few were willing to stay, and almost the whole population chose to relocate, taking their belongings with them. Only the buildings and machinery were to be left behind intact as per the Peace Treaty, which for the most part also took place.

During the Continuation War, some 260,000 of the displaced population returned home. In June 1944, Finnish troops partially withdrew from the ceded areas again as a result of the Soviet Fourth strategic offensive. Simultaneously, the population was again evacuated.

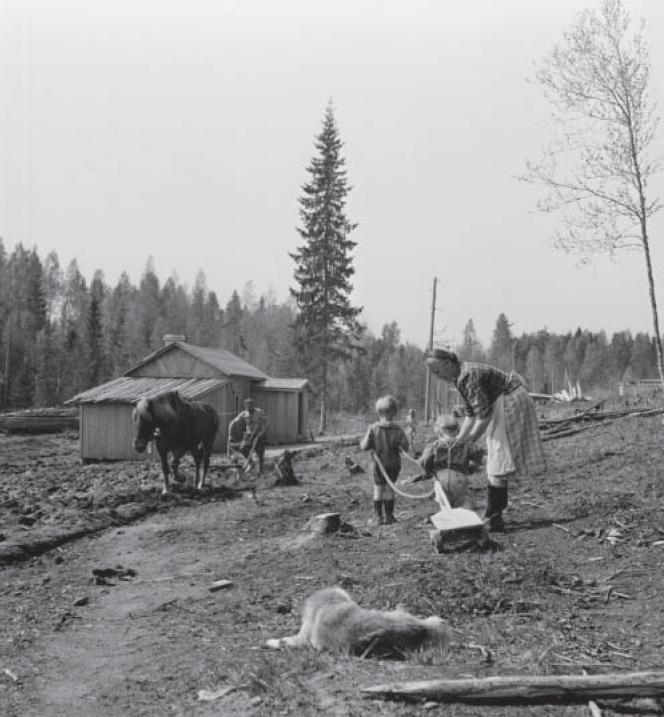
An evacuee family resettled in the Askola parish in Southern Finland, toiling on the field.

The Paris Peace Treaty finally confirmed the loss of Finland's territory. The evacuees were permanently settled in Finland. The government of Finland subsidized the resettlement in two ways:

- Resettlers were subsidized. Families were allocated land in proportion to their former property. In addition, everyone evacuated from Finnish Karelia was given the right to receive a homestead and city-dwellers and business-owners were given monetary compensation. The right to homestead was also extended to war veterans, widows and orphans of war.
- Private owners of the land given to resettlers were monetarily compensated for the loss of real estate.

Since the 1990s, some associations have demanded the return of Finnish Karelia to Finland. However, the official position of Finland has been it does not have any territorial disputes or demands with Russia.

== See also ==
- Evacuee Flag Day – Flag flying day in Finland
- Finnish war children
