= Kymi Province =

Former province in Finland

Kymi Province Kymen lääni (Finnish) Kymmene län (Swedish)
- Province of Finland
- 1945–1997
- Coat of arms

- Capital: Kouvola
- Area
  - 1 January 1993: 12,828 km^{2} (4,953 sq mi)
- Population
  - 1 January 1993: 335,037
- History
  - Established: 1945
  - Disestablished: 1997
Preceded by	Succeeded by
Viipuri Province	Southern Finland Province

The Kymi Province (Finnish: Kymen lääni, Swedish: Kymmene län) was a province of Finland from 1945 to 1997.

The Kymi Province was the remainder of the territory from the Viipuri Province after the main part was left to Russia at the Moscow Armistice in 1944. By the Paris Peace Treaty in 1947, territories on the Karelian Isthmus and around of the Lake Ladoga were formally ceded to the Soviet Union.

In 1997, the Kymi Province was merged with the Uusimaa Province and the southern parts of the Häme Province into the new Southern Finland Province.

== Maps ==
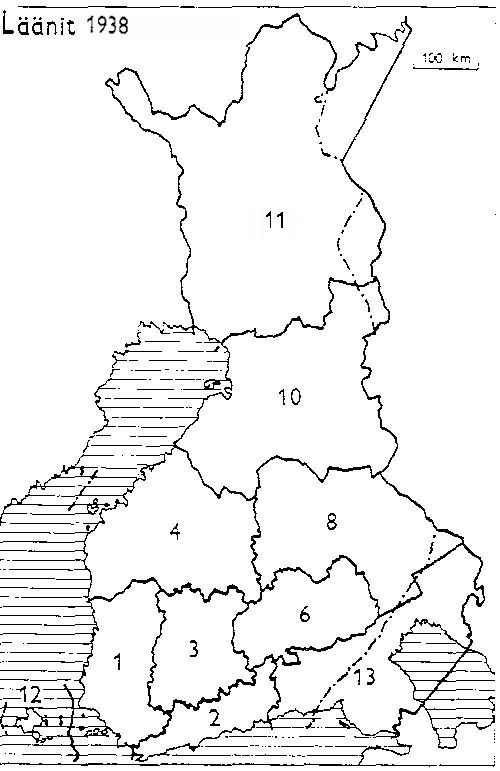
Provinces of Finland 1938: 1: Turku and Pori, 2: Uusimaa, 3: Häme, 4: Vaasa, 6: Mikkeli, 8: Kuopio, 10: Oulu, 11: Lapland, 12: Åland, 13: Viipuri

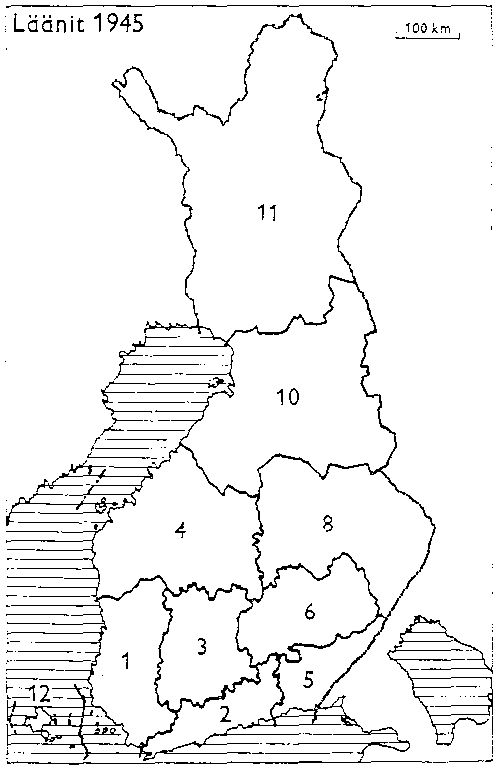
Provinces of Finland 1945: 1: Turku and Pori, 2: Uusimaa, 3: Häme, 4: Vaasa, 5: Kymi, 6: Mikkeli, 8: Kuopio, 10: Oulu, 11: Lapland, 12: Åland

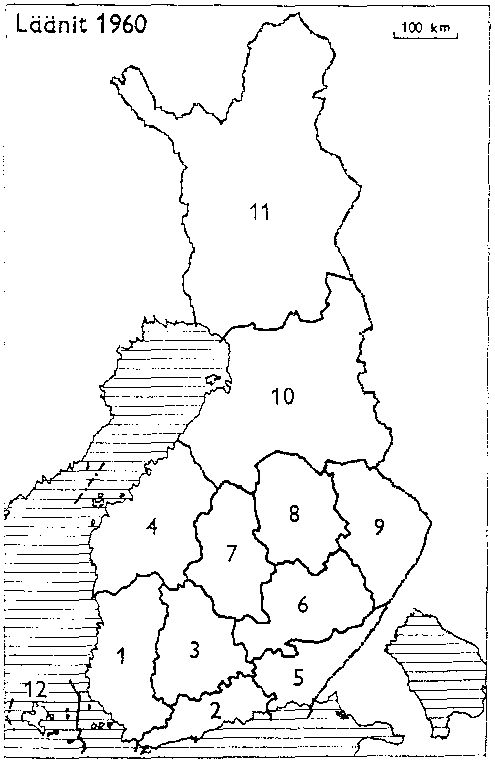
Provinces of Finland 1960: 1: Turku and Pori, 2: Uusimaa, 3: Häme, 4: Vaasa, 5: Kymi, 6: Mikkeli, 7: Central Finland, 8: Kuopio, 9: Northern Karelia, 10: Oulu, 11: Lapland, 12: Åland

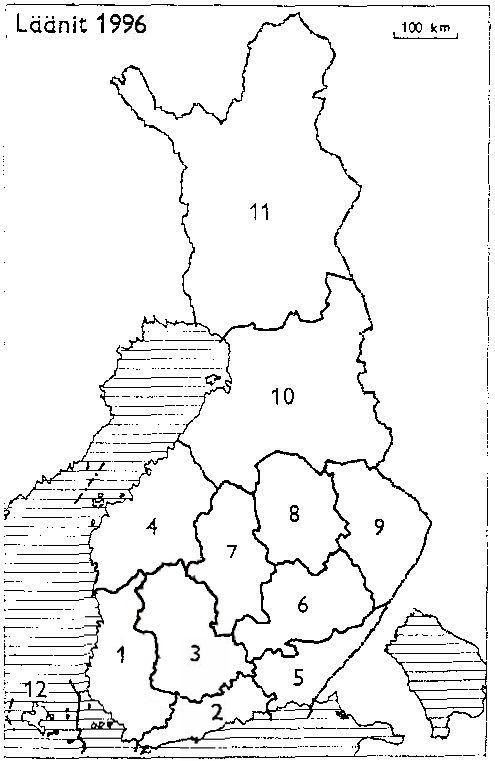
Provinces of Finland 1996: 1: Turku and Pori, 2: Uusimaa, 3: Häme, 4: Vaasa, 5: Kymi, 6: Mikkeli, 7: Central Finland, 8: Kuopio, 9: Northern Karelia, 10: Oulu, 11: Lapland, 12: Åland

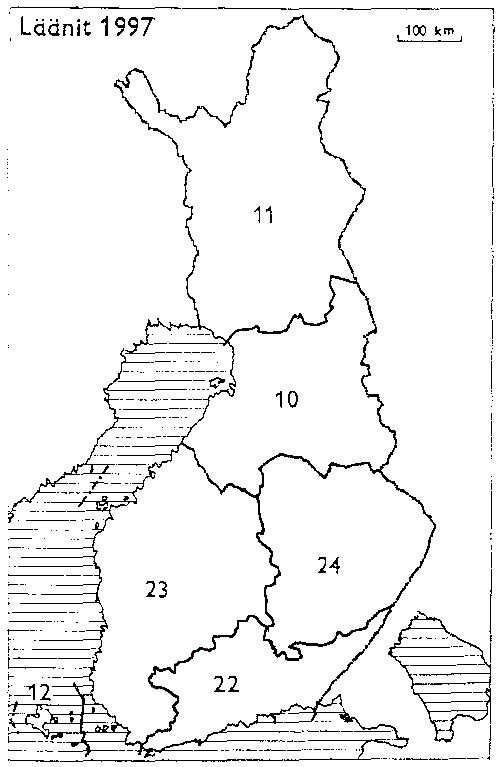
Provinces of Finland 1997: 10: Oulu, 11: Lapland, 12: Åland, 22: Southern Finland, 23: Western Finland, 24: Eastern Finland

== Municipalities in 1997 (cities in bold) ==
- **Anjalankoski**
- Elimäki
- **Hamina**
- Iitti
- **Imatra**
- Jaala
- Joutseno
- **Kotka**
- **Kouvola**
- **Kuusankoski**
- **Lappeenranta**
- Lemi
- Luumäki
- Miehikkälä
- Parikkala
- Pyhtää
- Rautjärvi
- Ruokolahti
- Saari
- Savitaipale
- Suomenniemi
- Taipalsaari
- Uukuniemi
- Valkeala
- Vehkalahti
- Virolahti
- Ylämaa

== Former municipalities (disestablished before 1997) ==
- Anjala
- Haapasaari
- Jääski
- Karhula
- Kymi
- Lappee
- Lauritsala
- Nuijamaa
- Simpele
- Sippola
- Säkkijärvi
- Vahviala

== Governors ==
- Arvo Manner 1945–1955
- Artturi Ranta 1955–1964
- Esko Peltonen 1965–1975
- Erkki Huurtamo 1975–1984
- Matti Jaatinen 1984–1993
- Mauri Miettinen 1993–1997
