= Regions of Southern Finland =

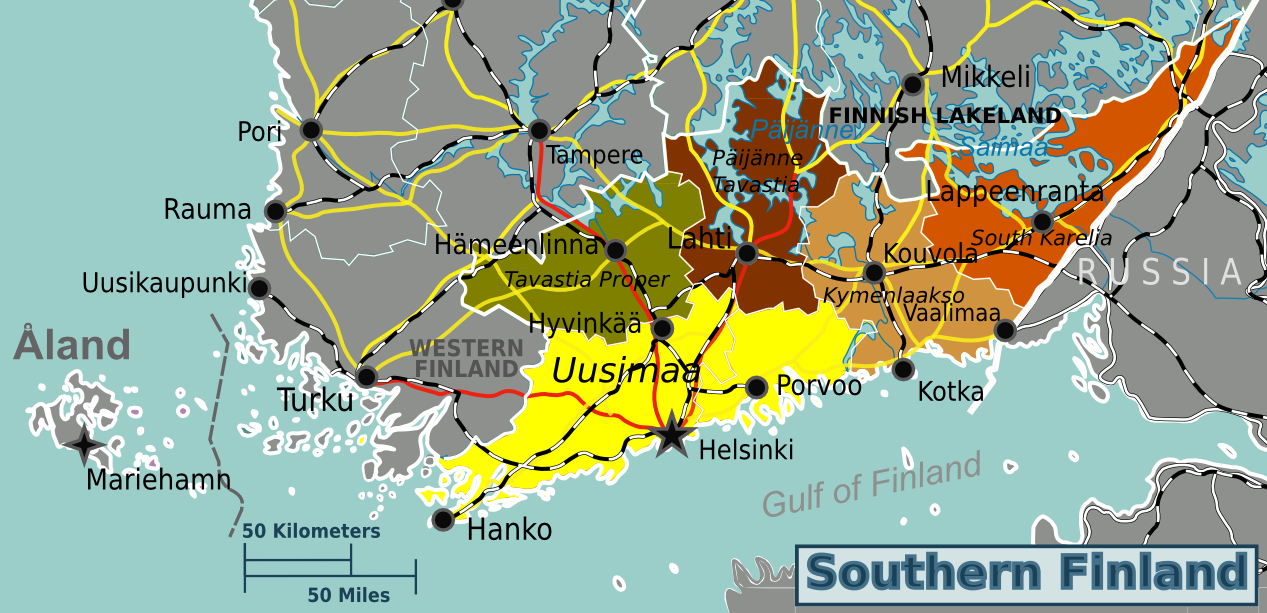

The former Province of Southern Finland in Finland was divided into six regions, 16 sub-regions, and 88 municipalities.

== Regions ==
- South Karelia (Etelä-Karjala/Södra Karelen)
- Päijät-Häme (Päijät-Häme/Päijänne-Tavastland)
- Kanta-Häme (Kanta-Häme/Egentliga Tavastland)
- Uusimaa (Uusimaa/Nyland)
- Kymenlaakso (Kymenlaakso/Kymmenedalen)

== South Karelia Region ==
- Lappeenranta Sub-region
  - Joutseno
  - Lappeenranta (Villmanstrand)
- Western Saimaa
  - Lemi
  - Luumäki
  - Savitaipale
  - Suomenniemi
  - Taipalsaari
  - Ylämaa
- Imatra Sub-region
  - Imatra
  - Rautjärvi
  - Ruokolahti (Ruokolax)
- Kärkikunnat Sub-region
  - Parikkala
  - Saari
  - Uukuniemi

== Päijät-Häme Region ==
- Lahti Sub-region
  - Artjärvi (Artsjö)
  - Asikkala
  - Hollola
  - Hämeenkoski
  - Kärkölä
  - Lahti (Lahtis)
  - Nastola
  - Orimattila
  - Padasjoki
- Heinola Sub-region
  - Hartola (Gustav Adolfs)
  - Heinola
  - Sysmä

== Kanta-Häme Region ==
- Hämeenlinna Sub-region
  - Hattula
  - Hauho
  - Hämeenlinna (Tavastehus)
  - Janakkala
  - Kalvola
  - Lammi
  - Renko
  - Tuulos
- Riihimäki Sub-region
  - Hausjärvi
  - Loppi
  - Riihimäki
- Forssa Sub-region
  - Forssa
  - Humppila
  - Jokioinen (Jockis)
  - Tammela
  - Ypäjä

== Uusimaa Region ==
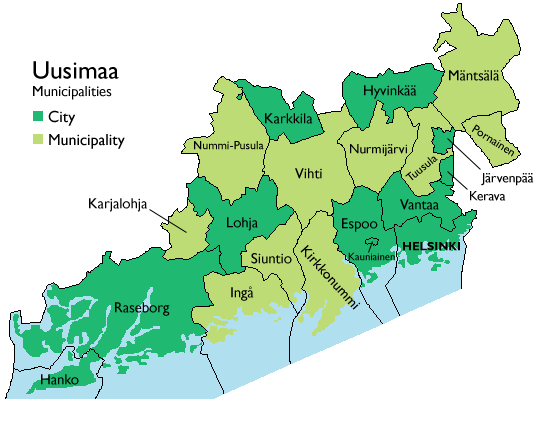

- Helsinki Sub-region
  - Espoo (Esbo)
  - Helsinki (Helsingfors)
  - Vantaa (Vanda)
  - Hyvinkää (Hyvinge)
  - Järvenpää (Träskända)
  - Kauniainen (Grankulla)
  - Kerava (Kervo)
  - Kirkkonummi (Kyrkslätt)
  - Mäntsälä
  - Nurmijärvi
  - Pornainen (Borgnäs)
  - Siuntio (Sjundeå)
  - Tuusula (Tusby)
- Lohja Sub-region
  - Karjalohja (Karislojo)
  - Karkkila (Högfors)
  - Lohja (Lojo)
  - Nummi-Pusula
  - Sammatti
  - Vihti (Vichtis)
- Porvoo Sub-region
  - Askola
  - Myrskylä (Mörskom)
  - Pukkila
  - Porvoo (Borgå)
  - Sipoo (Sibbo)
- Loviisa Sub-region
  - Lapinjärvi (Lappträsk)
  - Liljendal
  - Loviisa (Lovisa)
  - Pernå (Pernaja)
  - Ruotsinpyhtää (Strömfors)
- Ekenäs Sub-region
  - Hanko (Hangö)
  - Ingå (Inkoo)
  - Karis (Karjaa)
  - Pohja (Pojo)
  - Ekenäs (Tammisaari)

== Kymenlaakso Region ==

- Kouvola Sub-region
  - Elimäki (Elimä)
  - Iitti (Itis)
  - Jaala
  - Kouvola
  - Kuusankoski
  - Anjalankoski
  - Valkeala
- Kotka-Hamina Sub-region
  - Hamina (Fredrikshamn)
  - Kotka
  - Miehikkälä
  - Pyhtää (Pyttis)
  - Virolahti (Vederlax)

== See also ==
- Municipalities of South Karelia
- Municipalities of Päijät-Häme
- Municipalities of Kanta-Häme
- Municipalities of Uusimaa
- Municipalities of Kymenlaakso
