= Viipuri Province =

Former Finnish province (1812–1945)

Viipuri Province Viipurin lääni Viborgs län Выборгская губерния
- Province of Finland
- 1812–1945
- Coat of arms

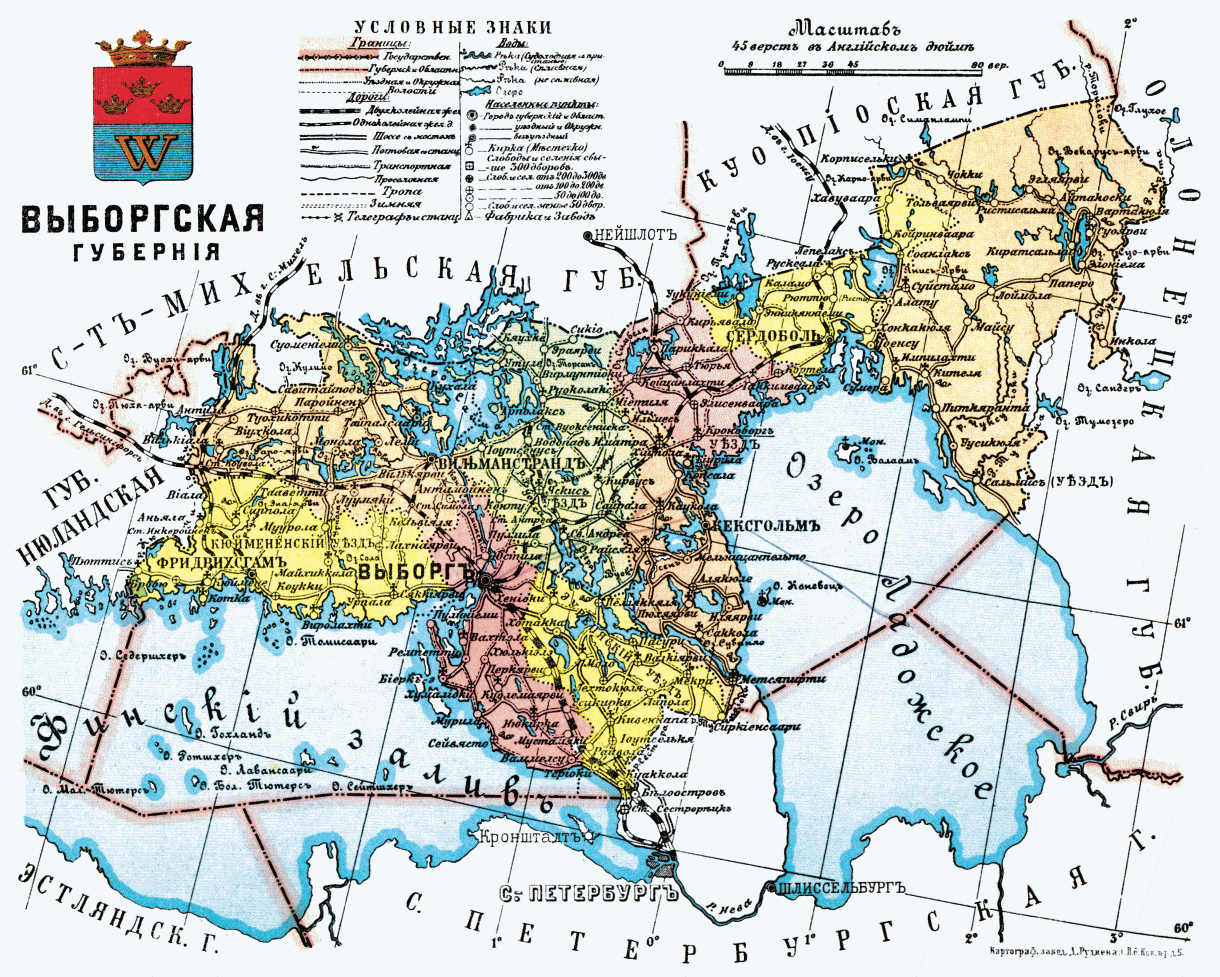
- Map of the province of Vyborg from 1913
- Capital: Viipuri
- Area
  - 1939^{1}: 32,134 km^{2} (12,407 sq mi)
- Population
  - 1939^{1}: 620,838
- History
  - Established: 1812
  - Disestablished: 1945
Preceded by
Vyborg Governorate
Succeeded by
Karelo-Finnish Soviet Socialist Republic
Leningrad Oblast
Kymi Province
- ^{1} About 43 thousand km^{2} with the surface of the Finnish part of Lake Ladoga.

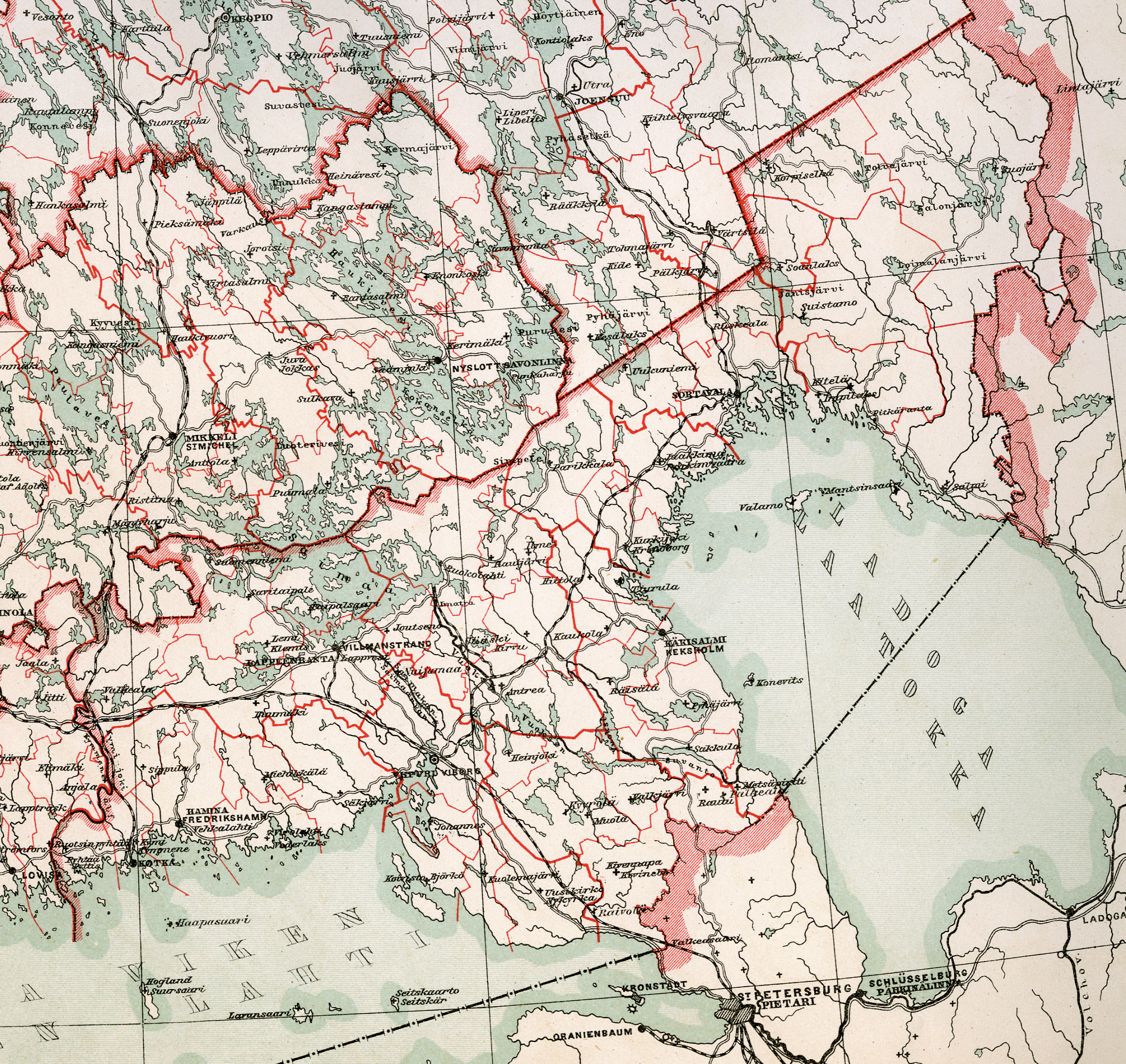
Viipuri Province in 1897

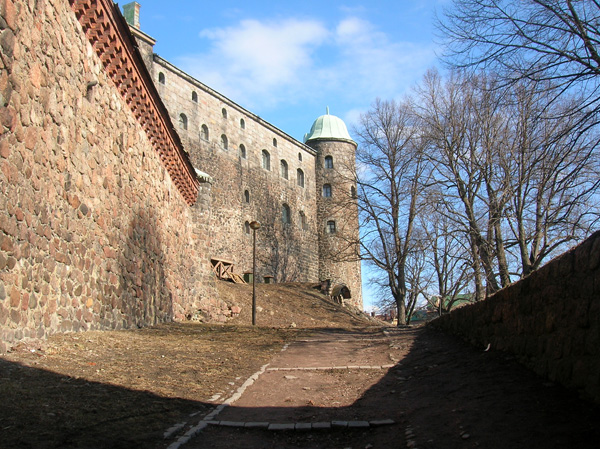
Viborg Castle

Viipuri Province (Note: Finnish: Viipurin lääni; Swedish: Viborgs län; Russian: Выборгская губерния, romanized: Vyborgskaya guberniya) was a province of Finland from 1812 to 1945.

== History ==
The predecessor of the province was Vyborg Governorate, which was established in 1744 from territories ceded by the Swedish Empire to Russia in 1721 (Treaty of Nystad) and in 1743 (Treaty of Åbo). These territories originated as parts of the Viborg and Nyslott County and Kexholm County in 1721, and parts of the Savolax and Kymmenegård County in 1743. The governorate was also known as Old Finland.

During the Napoleonic Wars, the Kingdom of Sweden had allied itself with the Russian Empire, United Kingdom and other parties against Napoleonic France. However, following the Treaty of Tilsit in 1807, Russia made peace with France. In 1808, supported by France, Russia successfully challenged Swedish control over Finland in the Finnish War. In the Treaty of Fredrikshamn on September 17, 1809, Sweden was obliged to cede all its territory in Finland east of the Torne River to Russia. The Russian Empire reconstituted the new territories into the autonomous Grand Duchy of Finland, with the Russian Tsar as Grand Duke.

In 1812, the territories of the Vyborg Governorate were transferred from Russia proper to the Grand Duchy of Finland and established as Viipuri Province. The transfer announced by Tsar Alexander I just before Christmas, on December 23, 1811 O.S. (January 4, 1812 N.S.), can be seen as a symbolic gesture and an attempt to appease the sentiment of the Finnish population, which had just experienced Russian conquest of their country by force. Siestarjoki was transferred to Saint Petersburg Governorate in 1864.

When Finland became independent from Russia in 1917, the status of Viipuri Province remained unchanged. The provincial capital, Vyborg (Swedish: Viborg, Finnish: Viipuri), was at this time the fourth largest city in Finland.

Viipuri Province had sided with the Finnish Socialist Workers' Republic during the Finnish Civil War. The Province was important to Red Finland for the reason that it shared a border with the Russian SFSR which in turn could send troops and supplies to Red Finland.

=== World War II ===
On September 1, 1939, Nazi Germany invaded Poland and started World War II. On September 17, 1939, the USSR, in accordance with the secret protocols of the Molotov–Ribbentrop Pact, invaded Poland from the east. Within months, the Soviet Union launched a war against Finland. As a result of this war, Finland was forced to cede territory, including parts of Viipuri Province, to the Soviet Union in the Moscow Peace Treaty in early 1940. Finland lost its natural border along the Rajajoki River (Swedish: Systerbäck) in the south. 22,973 km^{2}, or 71.5 percent of the province on the Karelian Isthmus, including the cities of Viipuri and Sortavala, became part of the newly established Karelo-Finnish SSR in the Soviet Union. Following the peace treaty, the entire population of the ceded territories, more than four hundred thousand people, was evacuated to central Finland.

In 1941 the Continuation War broke out and Finland recaptured the territories, but in 1944 its forces were pushed back and by the Moscow Armistice on September 19, 1944, and the Paris Peace Treaty in 1947 the territorial losses were confirmed again.

Winter war evacuees had returned following the Finnish offensive in 1941 and were evacuated again in 1944 after the Soviet counterattack, and the territories were repopulated by people from other parts of the Soviet Union. This time, the Karelian Isthmus became part of the Vyborgsky and Priozersky districts of the Leningrad Oblast, and only Ladoga Karelia and Border Karelia became part of the Karelo-Finnish SSR.

While Ladoga Karelia retained most of its original toponyms, the vast majority of toponyms in the Karelian Isthmus were renamed by the Soviet government around 1948. In 1945 the parts of the province that remained in Finnish hands were renamed Kymi Province, with its center at Kouvola. The Kymi Province was in turn merged with other provinces into the larger Southern Finland Province in 1997.

== Maps ==
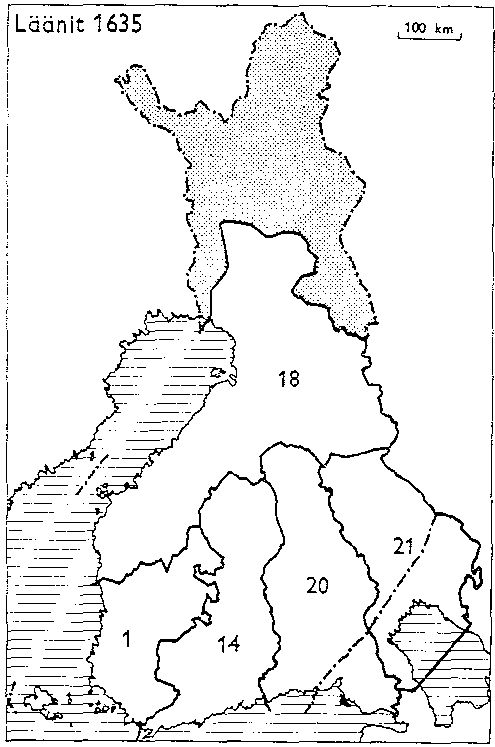
Provinces of Finland 1634: 1: Turku and Pori, 14: Nyland and Tavastehus, 18: Ostrobothnia, 20: Viborg and Nyslott, 21: Kexholm

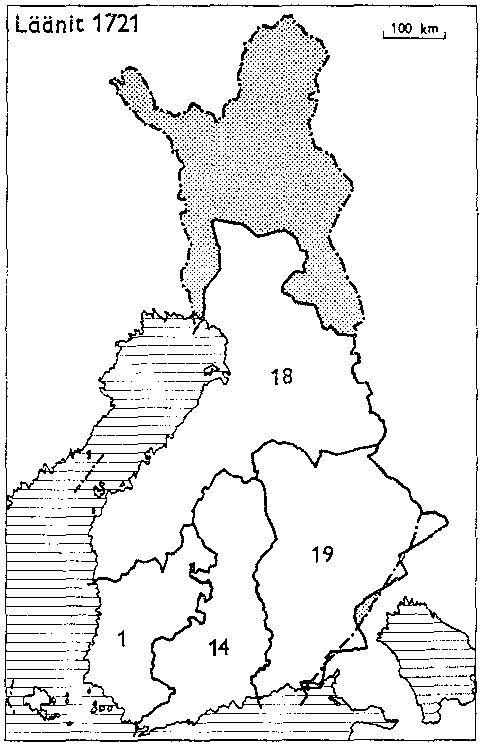
Provinces of Finland 1721: 1: Turku and Pori, 14: Nyland and Tavastehus, 18: Ostrobothnia, 19: Kymmenegård and Nyslott

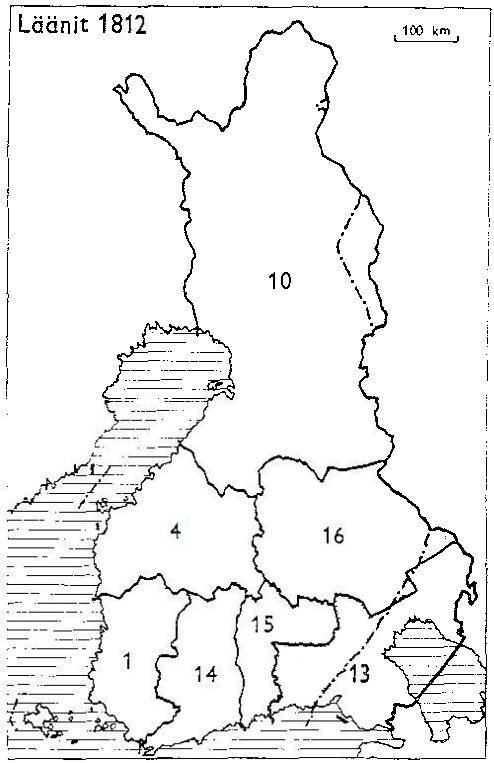
Provinces of Finland 1812:1: Turku and Pori, 4: Vaasa, 10: Oulu, 13: Viipuri, 14: Nyland and Tavastehus, 15: Kymmenegård, 16: Savolax and Karelia

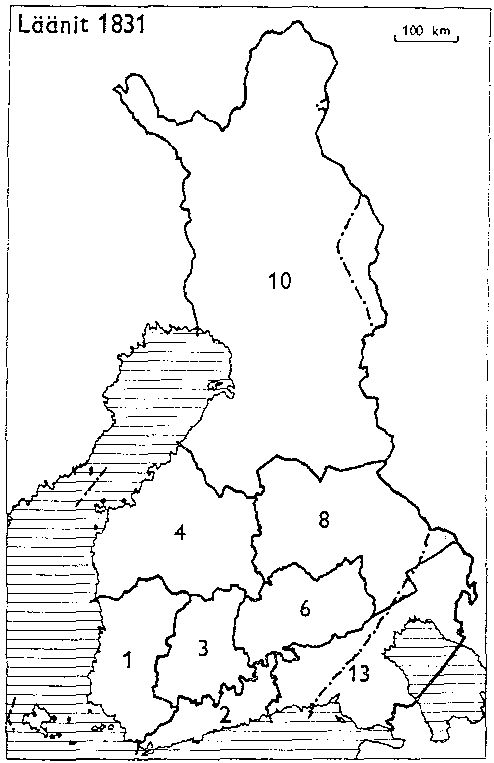
Provinces of Finland 1831: 1: Turku and Pori, 2: Uusimaa, 3: Häme, 4: Vaasa, 6: Mikkeli, 8: Kuopio, 10: Oulu, 13: Viipuri

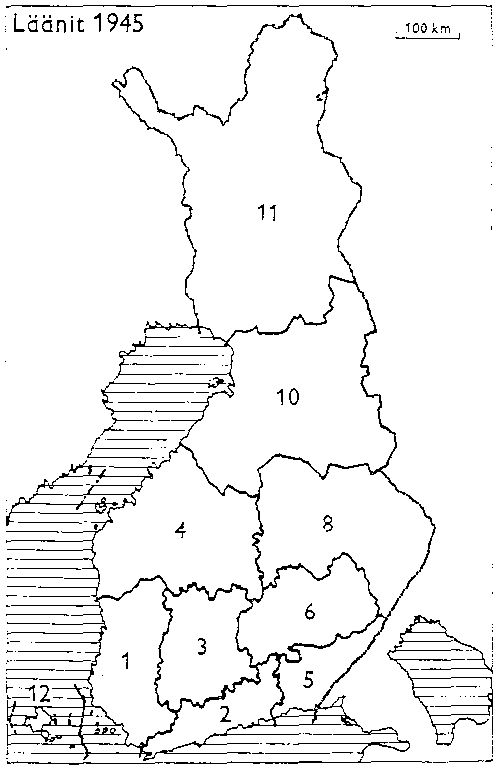
Provinces of Finland 1945: 1: Turku and Pori, 2: Uusimaa, 3: Häme, 4: Vaasa, 5: Kymi, 6: Mikkeli, 8: Kuopio, 10: Oulu, 11: Lapland, 12: Åland

Coat of arms between 1812 and 1917

Coat of arms after 1917

== Economy ==
The area had a well-developed economy due to its proximity to Saint Petersburg, the capital of the Russian Empire. In 1856 Saimaa Canal (Russian: Сайменский канал, Saymensky kanal) was opened, linking Lake Saimaa and Finnish Lakeland to the Vyborg Bay.

The development of the province was bolstered further by the construction of the Saint Petersburg–Riihimäki railroad in 1870, the Viborg–Joensuu railroad in 1894 and the Petrograd–Hiitola railroad in 1917.

Granite, marble (in Ruskeala) and bog iron mining as well as logging were important branches of industry. Starting from the beginning of the 20th century, a number of hydroelectric power plants were built by Enso in the higher reaches of the River Vuoksi to supply its pulp and paper mills.

== Serfdom ==
Following its cession to Russia in 1721, the Vyborg Governorate initially retained Swedish laws, which upheld the personal freedom of peasants and workers. However, throughout the 18th century, an influx of Russian landowners introduced the institution of serfdom to the region—a practice eventually adopted by some established local families as well. By 1812, in the city of Viipuri, for example, 106 serfs were recorded within a population of over 2,900.

Serfdom became a legal issue when the province was incorporated into the Grand Duchy of Finland in 1812 and the emperor declared that all inhabitants were to be governed by Finnish laws, which did not recognize ownership of human beings. Nevertheless, members of the Russian upper class and families of German origin continued to keep serfs after 1812. References to serfdom become increasingly sparse in the sources after the 1840s.

== Administrative divisions ==
=== Local districts ===
In Finnish kihlakunta, in Swedish härad.

- Ranta Swedish: Stranda
- Äyräpää Swedish: Äyräpää
- Käkisalmi Swedish: Kexholm
- Kurkijoki Swedish: Kronoborg now usually transliterated into English as Kurkiyoki (Куркиёки)
- Kymi Swedish: Kymmene
- Lappee Swedish: Lappvesi
- Salmi Swedish: Salmis
- Sortavala Swedish: Sordavala
- Jääski Swedish: Jäskis

=== Cities, towns and municipalities in 1939 ===
Those which were ceded to the Soviet Union during World War II are given in italics.

Cities

- Hamina – Fredrikshamn
- Kotka
- Käkisalmi – Kexholm
- Lappeenranta – Villmanstrand
- Sortavala – Sordavala
- Viipuri – Viborg

Towns

- Kouvola
- Koivisto – Björkö
- Lahdenpohja
- Lauritsala (merged into Lappeenranta in 1967)

Rural municipalities

Finnish/Swedish name. Main village with the same name unless otherwise noted.

- Antrea – S:t Andree
- Haapasaari – Aspö (merged into Kotka in 1974)
- Harlu
- Heinjoki
- Hiitola
- Impilahti – Impilax
- Jaakkima
- Johannes – S:t Johannes
- Joutseno (merged into Lappeenranta in 2009
- Jääski – Jäskis (partially lost, the rest incorporated into Imatra, Joutseno and Ruokolahti in 1948)
- Kanneljärvi
- Kaukola
- Kirvu – Kirvus
- Kivennapa – Kivinebb
- Koiviston maalaiskunta – Björkö landkommun (Koivisto rural municipality)
- Korpiselkä (partially lost, the rest incorporated into Tuupovaara in 1946)
- Kuolemajärvi
- Kurkijoki – Kronoborg
- Kymi – Kymmene (merged into Kotka in 1977)
- Käkisalmen maalaiskunta – Kexholms landkommun (Käkisalmi rural municipality)
- Lappee (merged into Lappeenranta in 1967) – Lappvesi
- Lavansaari – Lövskär
- Lemi – Klemis
- Lumivaara
- Luumäki
- Metsäpirtti
- Miehikkälä
- Muolaa – Mohla (Kyyrölä merged into Muolaa in 1934)
- Nuijamaa (merged into Lappeenranta in 1989)
- Parikkala
- Pyhtää – Pyttis
- Pyhäjärvi
- Rautjärvi
- Rautu – Rautus
- Ruokolahti – Ruokolax
- Ruskeala
- Räisälä
- Saari (merged into Parikkala in 2005)
- Sakkola
- Salmi – Salmis
- Savitaipale
- Seiskari – Seitskär
- Simpele (merged into Rautjärvi in 1973)
- Sippola (merged into Anjalankoski in 1975)
- Soanlahti
- Sortavalan maalaiskunta – Sordavala landkommun (Sortavala rural municipality)
- Suistamo
- Suojärvi
- Suomenniemi
- Suursaari – Hogland
- Säkkijärvi (partially lost, the rest incorporated into Miehikkälä and Ylämaa in 1946)
- Taipalsaari
- Terijoki
- Tytärsaari – Tytärskär
- Uukuniemi (merged into Parikkala in 2005)
- Uusikirkko – Nykyrka
- Vahviala (partially lost, the rest incorporated into Lappee and Ylämaa in 1946)
- Valkeala (merged into Kouvola in 2009
- Valkjärvi
- Vehkalahti – Veckelax (merged into Hamina in 2003)
- Viipurin maalaiskunta – Viborgs landkommun (Viipuri rural municipality)
- Virolahti – Vederlax
- Vuoksela
- Vuoksenranta
- Ylämaa (merged into Lappeenranta in 2010
- Äyräpää (main village – Pölläkkälä)

=== Electoral districts ===
Following the electoral reform to the new Parliament of Finland in 1906, the province was divided into an Eastern and a Western electoral district.

Western electoral district

Haapasaari, Hamina, Johannes, Kanneljärvi, Koivisto, Koiviston maalaiskunta, Kotka, Kouvola, Kuolemajärvi, Kymi, Lappee, Lappeenranta, Lauritsala, Lavansaari, Lemi, Luumäki, Miehikkälä, Nuijamaa, Pyhtää, Savitaipale, Seiskari, Sippola, Suomenniemi, Suursaari, Säkkijärvi, Taipalsaari, Tytärsaari, Uusikirkko, Vahviala, Valkeala, Vehkalahti, Viipuri, Viipurin maalaiskunta, Virolahti, Ylämaa.

Eastern electoral district

Antrea, Harlu, Heinjoki, Hiitola, Impilahti, Jaakkima, Joutseno, Jääski, Kaukola, Kirvu, Kivennapa, Korpiselkä, Kurkijoki, Käkisalmen maalaiskunta, Käkisalmi, Lahdenpohja, Lumivaara, Metsäpirtti, Muolaa, Parikkala, Pyhäjärvi, Rautjärvi, Rautu, Ruokolahti, Ruskeala, Räisälä, Sakkola, Salmi, Simpele, Soanlahti, Sortavala, Sortavalan maalaiskunta, Suistamo, Suojärvi, Terijoki, Uukuniemi, Valkjärvi, Vuoksela, Vuoksenranta, Äyräpää.

== Gallery ==
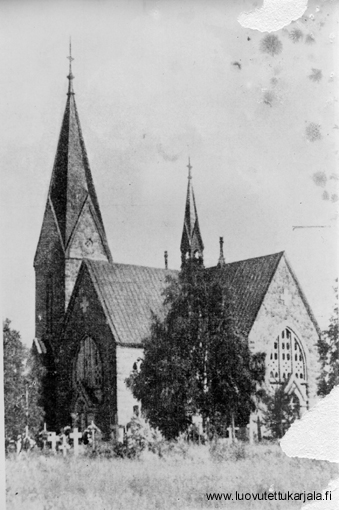
Kuolemajärvi Lutheran Church. Built in 1903, destroyed in 1939.

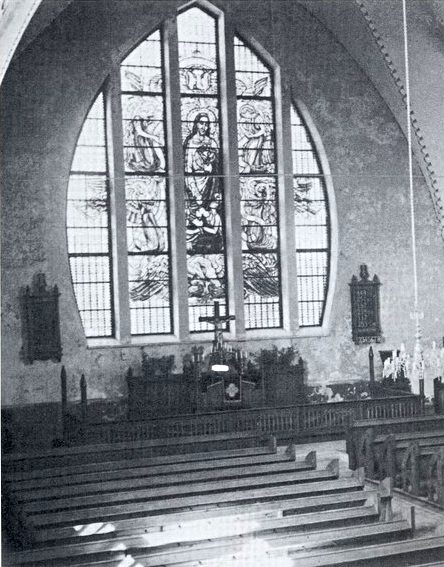
Lutheran Church in Koivisto, designed by Josef Stenbäck

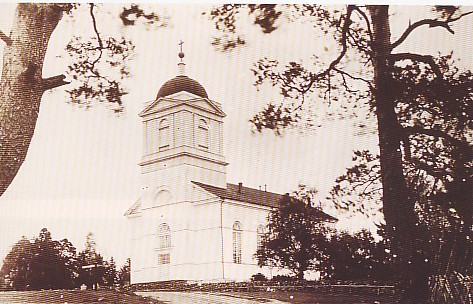
Muolaa Lutheran church. Built in 1849, destroyed during the Second World War.

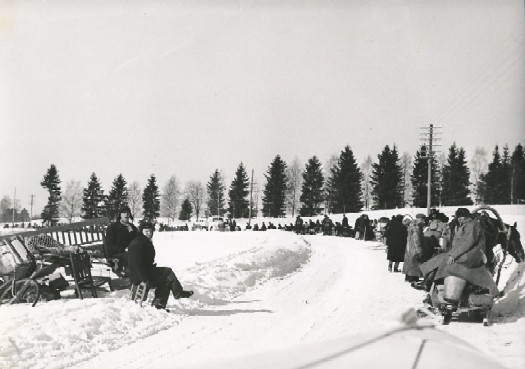
Evacuees from Muolaa municipality on their way to West-Finland, December 1939

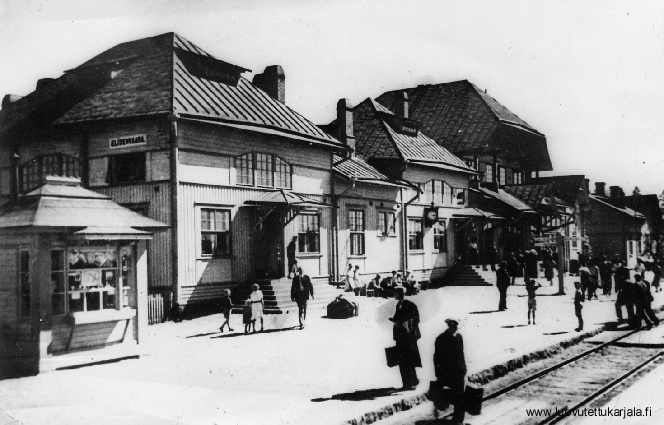
The old railway station in Elisenvaara, constructed around 1893, was destroyed in the Winter War.

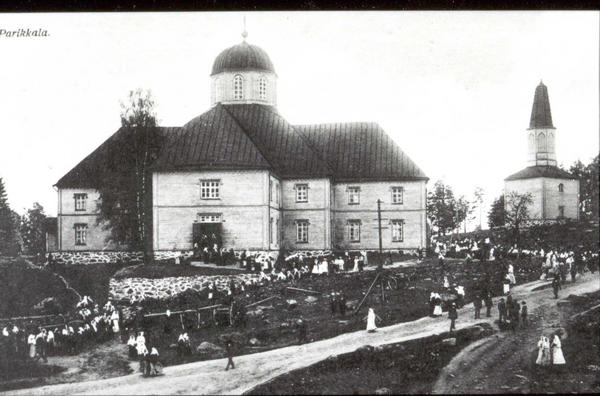
Parikkala old Lutheran Church

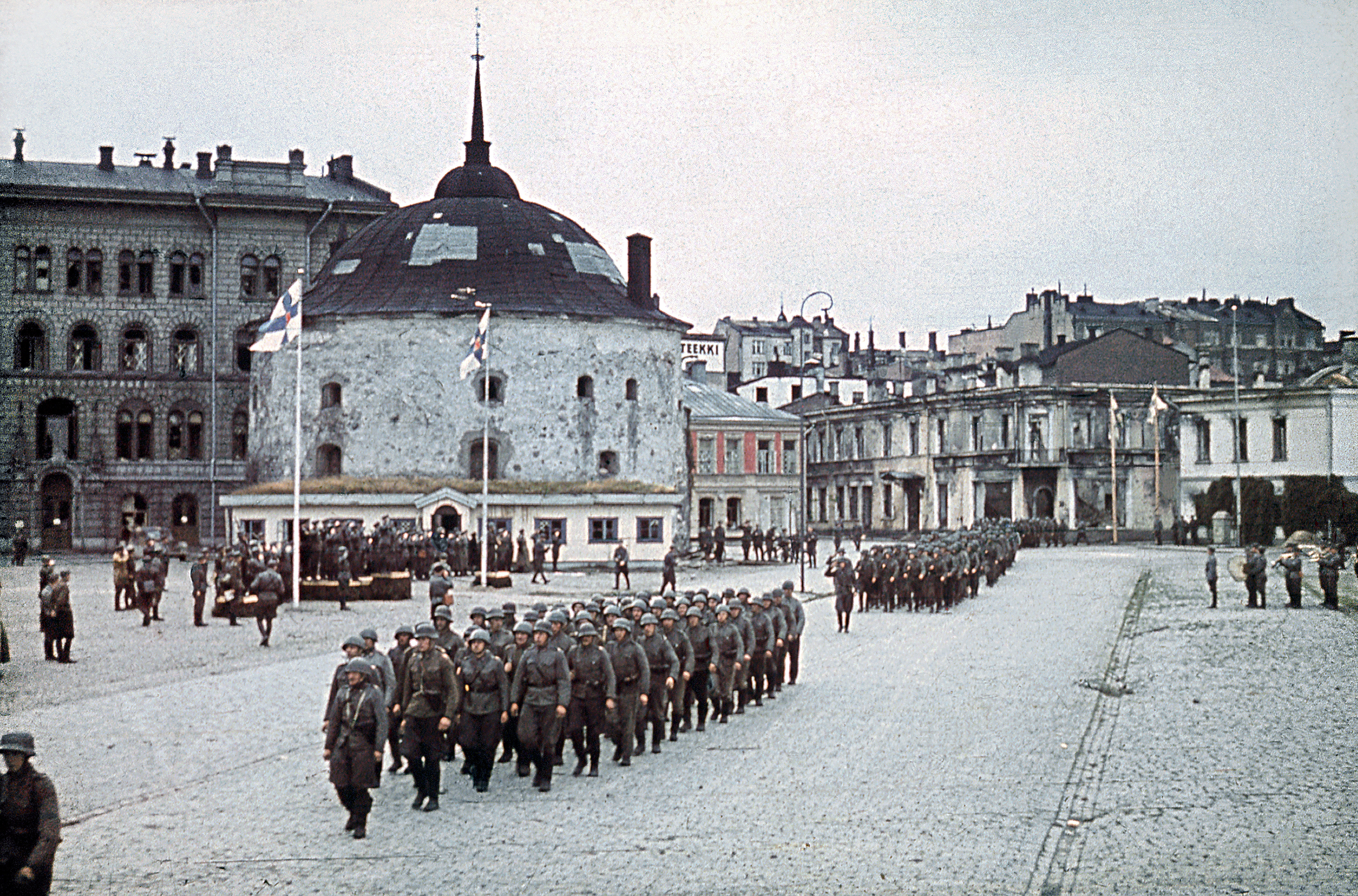
Finnish military parade in Viipuri on August 31, 1941, after its recapture

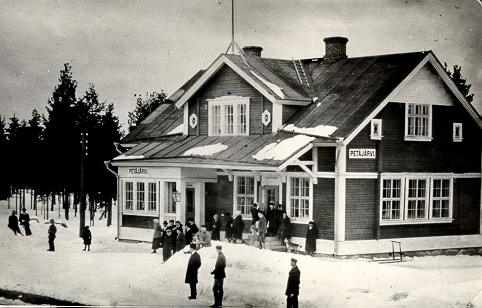
The Petäjärvi railway station, Sakkola municipality, in the 1930s

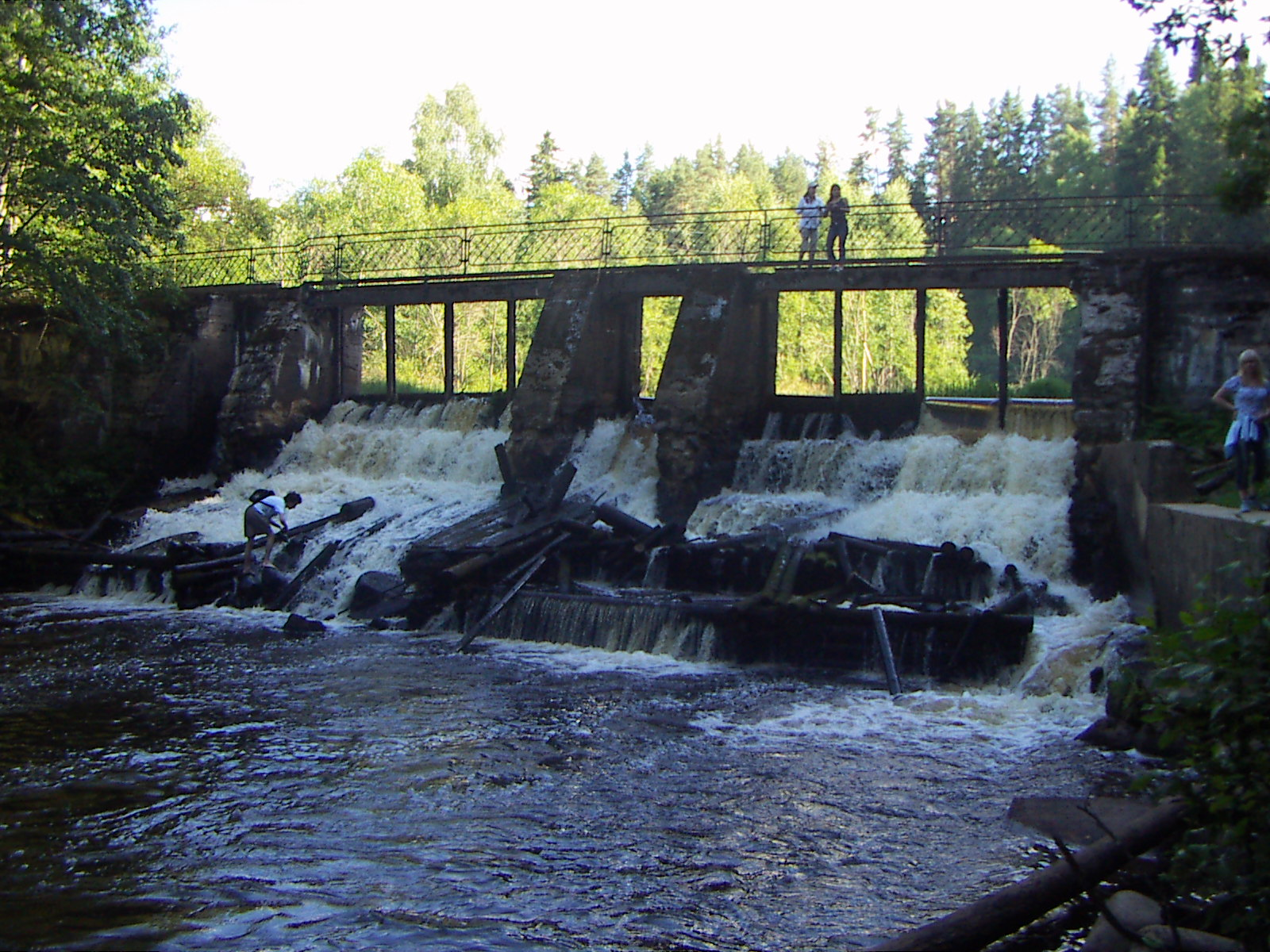
Dam of the old private Finnish hydroelectric plant on Saijanjoki

== Governors ==
Governors of the Viipuri Province 1812–1945:

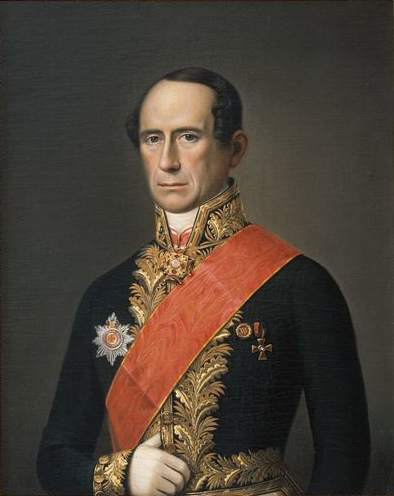
Carl Gustaf Mannerheim, Governor 1834–1839

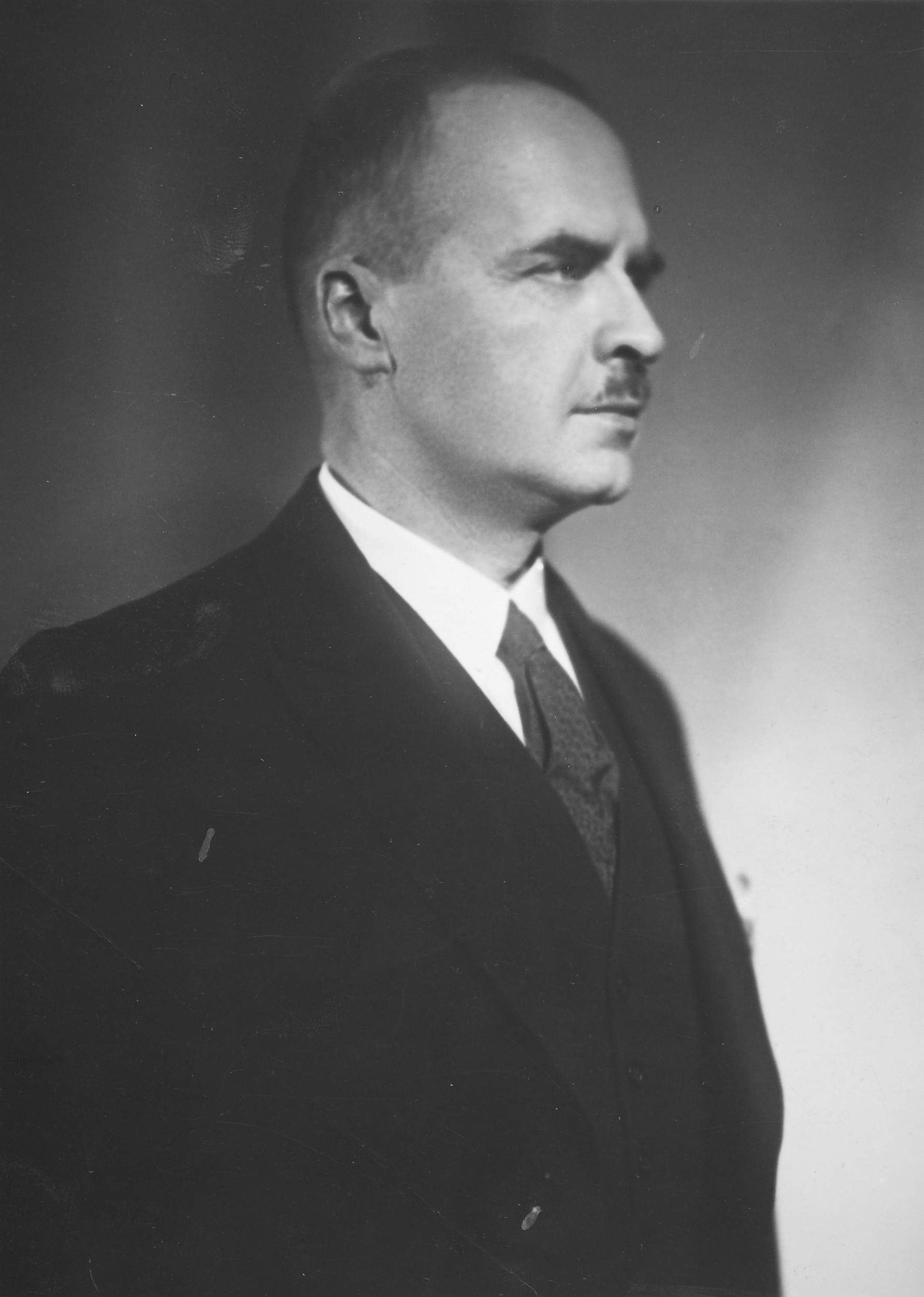
Antti Hackzell, Governor 1918–1920

- Carl Johan Stjernvall 1812–1815
- Carl Johan Walleen 1816–1820
- Otto Wilhelm Klinckowström 1820–1821 (acting) and 1821–1825
- Carl August Ramsay 1825–1827 (acting) and 1827–1834
- Carl Gustaf Mannerheim 1834–1839
- Fredric Stewen 1839–1844
- Casimir von Kothen 1844–1846 (acting) and 1846–1853
- Alexander Adam Thesleff 1853–1856
- Bernhard Indrenius 1856–1866
- Christian Theodor Åker-Blom 1866–1882
- Woldemar von Daehn 1882–1885
- Sten Carl Tudeer 1885–1888 (acting) and 1888–1889
- Johan Axel Gripenberg 1889–1899
- Nikolai von Rechenberg 1900–1902
- Nikolai Mjasojedov 1902–1905
- Konstantin Kazansky 1905 (acting) and 1905
- Mikael von Medem 1905–1906 (acting)
- Nikolai von Rechenberg 1906–1907
- Birger Gustaf Samuel von Troil 1907–1910
- Frans Carl Fredrik Josef von Pfaler 1910–1917
- Vilho Sarkanen (acting) 1917
- Valfrid Suhonen (acting) 1917–1918
- Antti Hackzell 1918–1920
- Lauri Kristian Relander 1920–1925
- Arvo Manner 1925–1945

Both the second President of Finland Lauri Kristian Relander and Carl Gustaf Mannerheim, grandfather of the sixth President, Carl Gustaf Emil Mannerheim, were governors of Viipuri province.

== Notable people ==
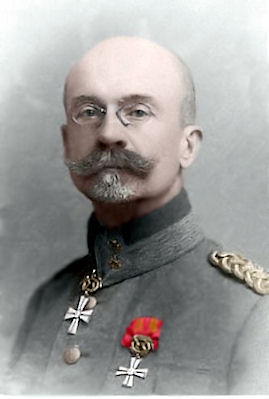
Ernst Löfström

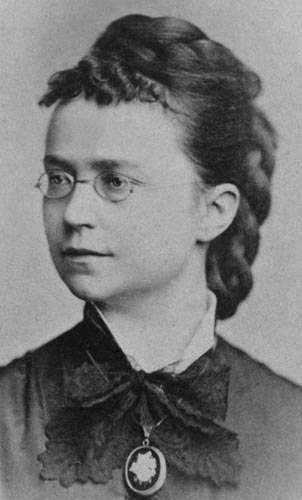
Lydia Sesemann

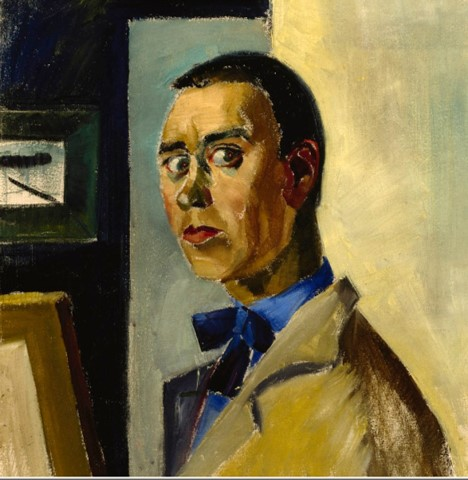
Väinö Kunnas Self-portrait, 1926

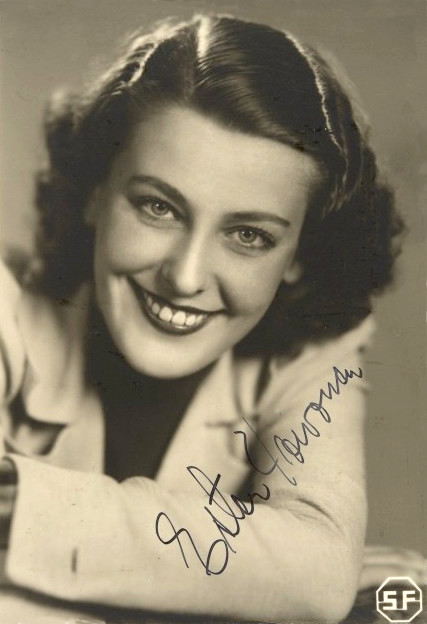
Ester Toivonen, 1930s

People born in Viipuri Province between 1812 and 1917, when it was part of the Grand Duchy of Finland

- Carl Jaenisch (1813–1872) Finnish and Russian chess player and theorist
- Stephen Wäkevä (1833 in Säkkijärvi – 1910) Russian silversmith of Finnish origin, Fabergé workmaster
- Julius Krohn (1835, Viipuri – 1888) Finnish poetry researcher, professor of Finnish literature and Fennoman
- Leo Mechelin (1839 in Hamina – 1914) Finnish professor, statesman, senator and liberal reformer
- Kaarlo Bergbom (1843, Viipuri – 1906) theatre director, founded the Finnish National Theatre
- Lydia Sesemann (1845–1925) Finnish doctor of chemistry
- Evald Relander (1856–1926), Finnish agronomist, rector and banker
- Alexandra Gripenberg (1857, Kurkiyoki [Finnish Kurkijoki] – 1913) Finnish social activist, newspaper publisher and Fennoman
- Ernst Löfström (1865–1937) Finnish general
- Gustaf Komppa (1867, Viipuri – 1949), Finnish chemist
- Armas Järnefelt (1869, Viipuri – 1958), Finnish composer and conductor
- Magnus Enckell (1870 in Hamina – 1925) Finnish symbolist painter
- Georg Schnéevoigt (1872–1947) Finnish conductor and cellist
- Hugo Simberg (1873–1917) Finnish symbolist painter and graphic artist.
- Erkki Melartin (1875 in Käkisalmi – 1937) Finnish composer
- Ernst Mielck (1877 in Viipuri – 1899), Finnish composer
- Onni Talas (1877 in Lappeenranta — 1958) Finnish lawyer, politician, professor and diplomat
- Aino Kallas (1878 in Kiiskilä – 1956) Finnish-Estonian author of novellas
- Uno Ullberg (1879, Viipuri – 1944), Finnish architect
- Lauri Kristian Relander (1883, Kurkiyoki – 1942), second President of Finland
- Kersti Bergroth (1886–1975) Finnish author and playwright.
- Algoth Niska (1888, Viipuri – 1954), a Finnish bootlegger, footballer and adventurer
- Juho Niukkanen (1888 in Kirvu – 1954), Finnish minister
- Karl Lennart Oesch (1892 in Pyhäjärvi – 1978), Finnish general
- Elsa Arokallio (1892 in Kurkiyoki – 1982) Finnish architect
- Edwin Linkomies (1894, Viipuri – 1963), Prime Minister of Finland
- Väinö Kunnas (1896–1929) Finnish Expressionist painter
- Saara Ranin (1898 in Hamina – 1992) Finnish actress and director
- Tyyne Leivo-Larsson (1902 in Uusikirkko – 1977) Finnish Ambassador and MP
- Cay Sundström (1902 in Hamina – 1959) Finnish dentist, politician and diplomat
- Simo Häyhä (born 1905, Rautjärvi – 2002), Finnish soldier
- Helvi Hämäläinen (1907 in Hamina – 1998) Finnish author, published prose and poetry
- Viljo Vesterinen (1907 in Terijoki – 1961) Finnish accordionist and composer.
- Sam Vanni (1908–1992) Finnish painter, pioneer of abstract art
- Veikko Lavi (1912 in Kotka – 1996) Finnish singer, songwriter and author
- Harry Lindblad (1912–1984) President of the Finnish Ice Hockey Association
- Armi Ratia (1912 Pälkjärvi – 1979) founder of the Finnish textile and clothing company Marimekko
- Sylvi Saimo (1914 in Jaakkima – 2004) Finnish sprint canoeist, gold medalist, 1952 Summer Olympics
- Wassily Hoeffding (1914 in Mustamäki – 1991) Finnish statistician and probabilist
- Johannes Virolainen (1914 near Viipuri – 2000), 30th Prime Minister of Finland
- Masa Niemi (1914, Viipuri – 1960) drummer, actor and comedian
- Mikhail Bogdanov (1914–1995) a Soviet production designer
- Ester Toivonen (1914 in Hamina — 1979) Miss Finland in 1933, Miss Europe 1934, then film star
- Helga Sonck-Majewski (1916–2015), Finnish artist
- Erna Tauro (1916–1993) Finnish-Swedish pianist and composer
- Anja Hatakka (1938–2026), Finnish actress

For people born after 1917 in Vyborg

== See also ==
- Fief of Viborg (1320–1534)
- Viborg and Nyslott County and Kexholm County (1634–1721)
- Karelian Isthmus for the present-day region, which once was the heartland of the province

== Works cited ==
- Einonen, Piia (2013). "Cultural Conflicts in a Border Town - The Question of Russian Serfdom in Vyborg in the Beginning of the 19th century". In Bárány, Attila; Matikainen, Satu (eds.). Small Nations on the Borderlines of Great Powers. Speculum Historiae Debreceniense. Vol. 14. Debrecen: Multiplex Media-Debrecen Kft. pp. 111–126. ISBN 978-963-473-604-2.
