= History of Karelia =

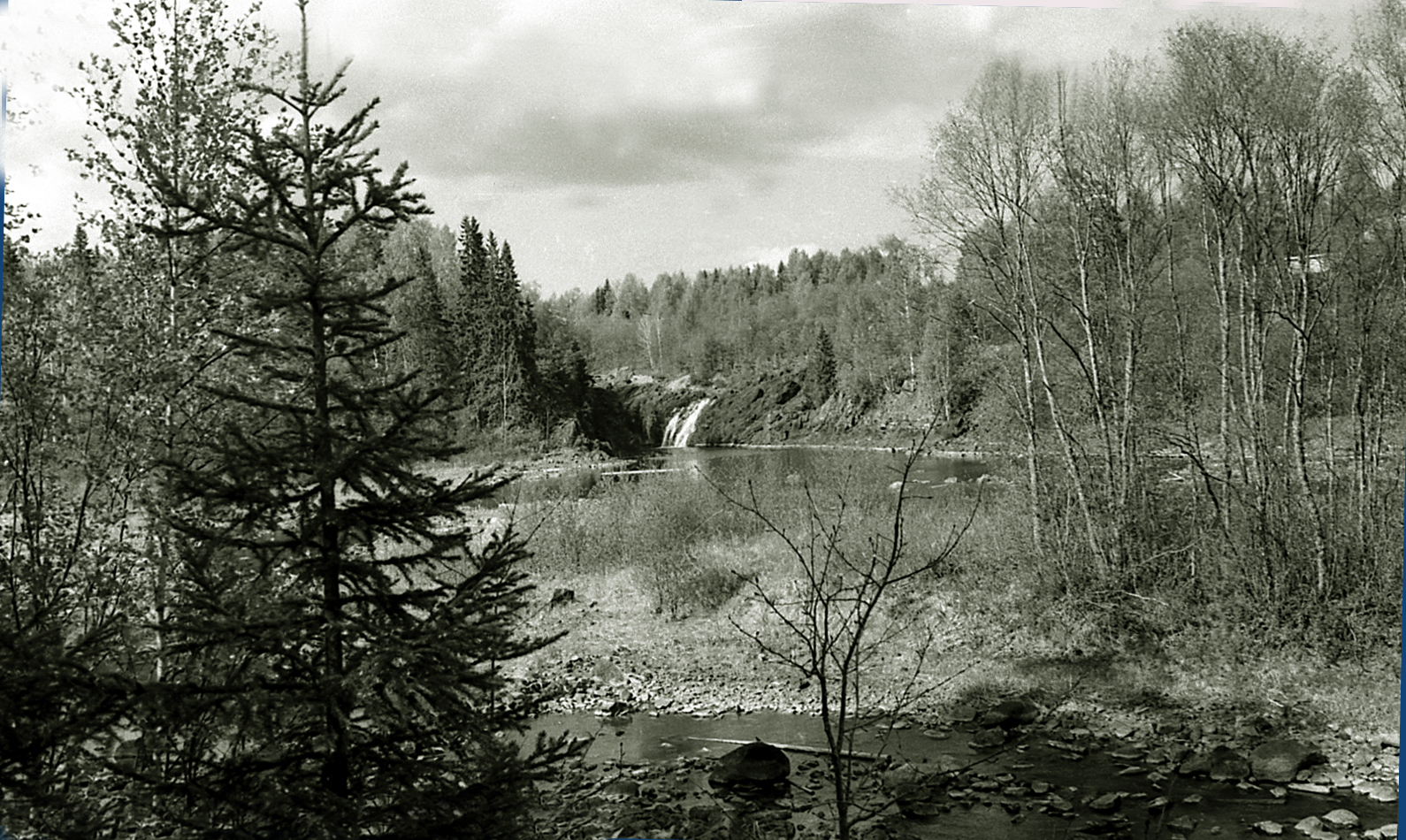
The Scandinavian and Russian taiga landscape in Karelia.

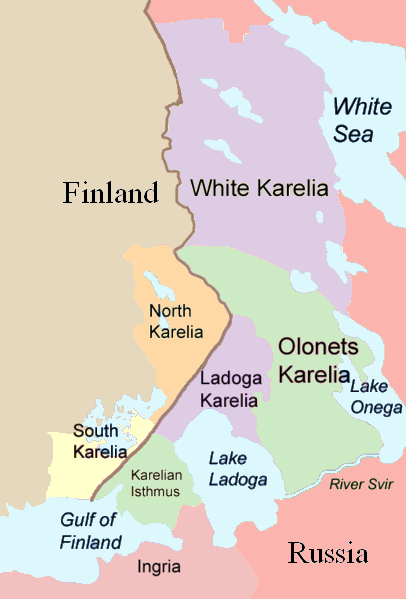
Regions of Karelia, as traditionally divided.

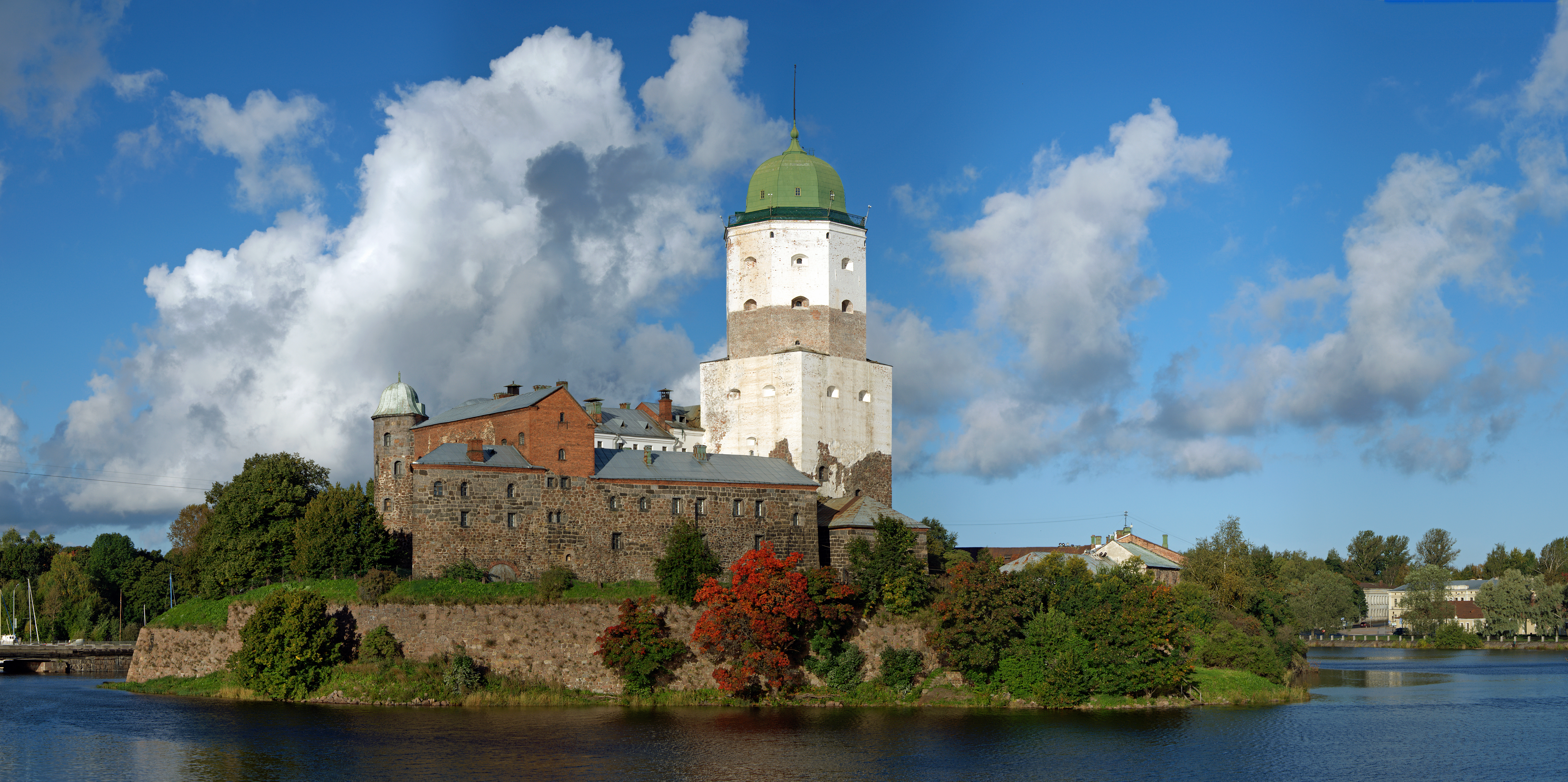
14th century Vyborg Castle, the easternmost outpost of medieval Sweden, in Karelia.

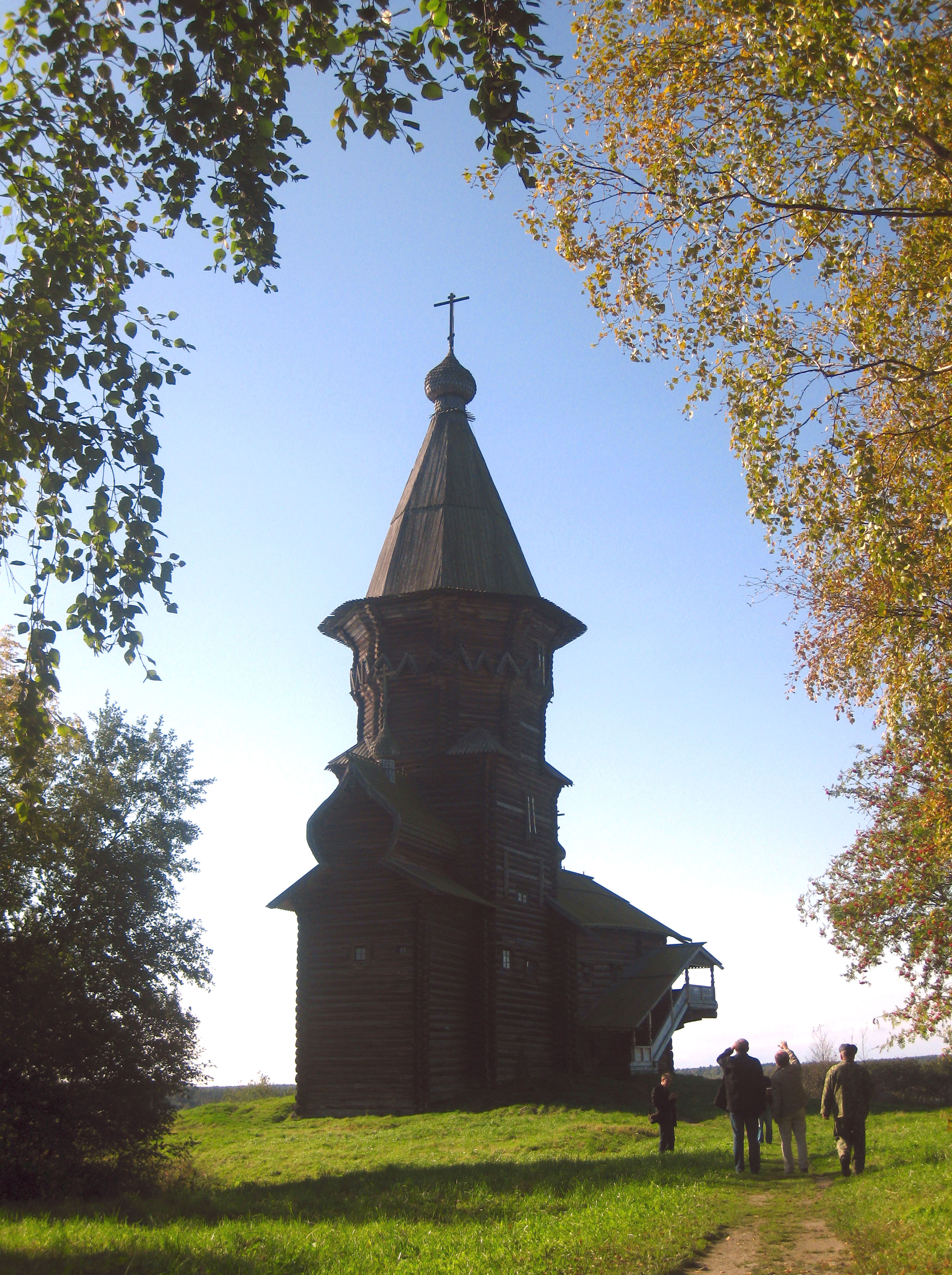
The 1774 Dormition of the Theotokos church, in Kondopoga, Karelia.

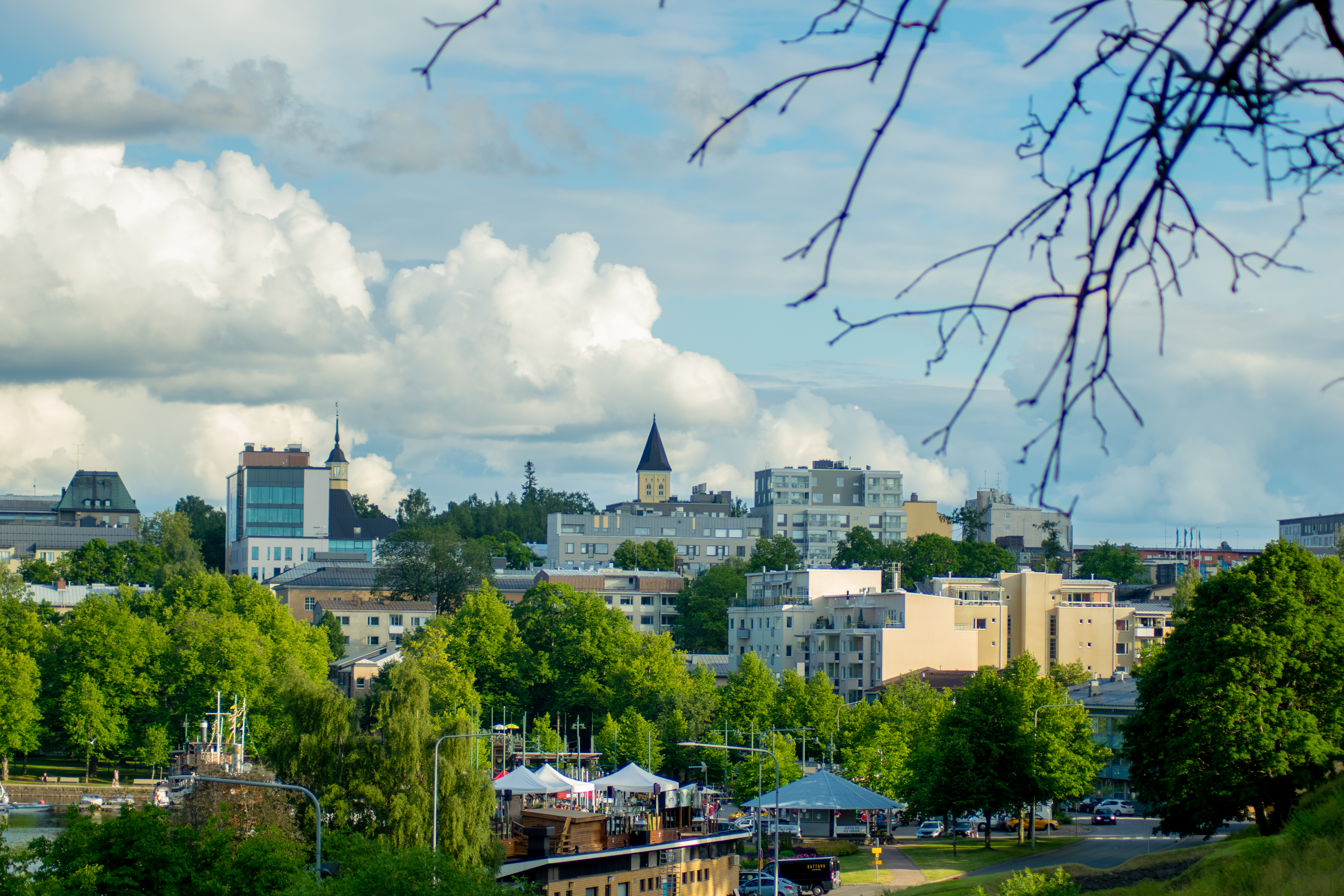
View of Lappeenranta, South Karelia.

The Karelian people's presence can be dated back to the 7th millennium BC–6th millennium BC. The region itself is rich with fish, lakes, and minerals, and because of that its holder has changed throughout history, and to this day it is divided between the Republic of Finland and the Russian Federation.

== Prehistoric ==
Karelia is primarily within the Scandinavian and Russian taiga habitat and ecoregion, which was rich in natural resources for prehistoric people's food and shelter needs.

The Vuoksi river was formed approximately 6,000 years ago when the waters of Saimaa breached the Salpausselkä ridge. The ancestors of Karelians and Finns crossed the Baltic Sea from Estonia into Finland between 1500 BC and 1300 BC.

The mining of copper in Karelia began between 1 AD and 1000 AD. The ethnic composition of Karelia at the end of the 1st millennium consisted of Balto-Finnic peoples.

== Middle Ages ==
During the Early Middle Ages, settlers from western Finland mixed with the local population to form the Karelian ethnic group. Possible migration from elsewhere may also have contributed to the Karelian ethnic composition.

Archeological evidence indicates that Karelian inhabitation was highest along the western shore of Lake Ladoga and the Karelian Isthmus, with multiple cemeteries and other archeological discoveries dating from AD 600 to AD 800. In South Karelia, the number of archeological discoveries from this time period is lower, though permanent inhabitation was nonetheless present. Lappee, South Karelia has been continuously inhabited for approximately 2,000 years. In North Karelia, only one archeological discovery from this time period has been found, dating to the eighth century. The considerably higher number of archeological discoveries in these regions from AD 800 to AD 1050 indicates that the Karelian population grew and expanded rapidly during this time. Karelia was mentioned several times in Viking Sagas, and until the IX century Karelian folk is mentioned as Kirjals and declared to have ties to Finns.

The Russian colonization of Karelia began around 1100, around the same time the Korela fortress was built. The new lands were then contested by the Swedes and bitterly fought over by Sweden and the Novgorod Republic during the 13th-century Swedish–Novgorodian Wars. The Treaty of Nöteborg (Finnish: Pähkinäsaaren rauha) in 1323 divided Karelia between the two. Sweden received the southern portion of the Karelian Isthmus and most of South Karelia. The province of Swedish Karelia would include this territory, plus the region east of the Kymi river. The Baltic Sea port city of Viborg (Finnish: Viipuri) became the capital of the new Swedish province, with the Fief of Viborg existing from 1320 to 1534. Novgorod received the northern portion of the Karelian Isthmus, North Karelia, Ladoga Karelia, and the northern portion of South Karelia. Käkisalmi served as the main population center of this region.

== Modern Era ==
Lappeenranta was chartered in 1649 by Queen Christina of Sweden. At that time, Lappeenranta was an important port for tar.

During the reign of Peter the Great the town of Petrozavodsk would be established, becoming a large industrial hub and one of the main artillery guns manufacturer of Russia. The first manufacture to be founded in Petrozavodsk was the Alexandrovsky Arms Manufacture.

The Treaty of Nystad (Finnish: Uudenkaupungin rauha) in 1721 between Imperial Russia and Sweden ceded most of Karelia, as the Vyborg Governorate, to Russia. The Treaty of Åbo in 1743 between Sweden and Russia then ceded South Karelia to Russia. After Finland had been occupied by Russia in the Finnish War, parts of the ceded provinces 'Old Finland' were incorporated into the Grand Duchy of Finland, in the Russian Empire.

Joensuu was founded in 1848 by Czar Nicholas I of Russia. By the end of the century, the total amount of villages of Olonetsk Karelia alone would surpass 600, having 7 cities at the same time.

== 20th century ==
=== Early 20th century ===
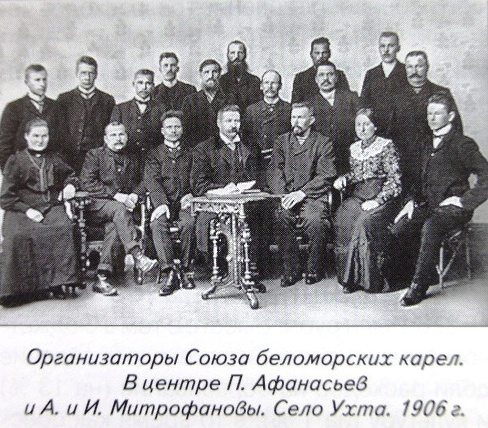
Union of White Sea Karelians

In 1906, the Union of White Sea Karelians (Finnish: Wienan karjalaisten liitto) was created. The Union's main goal was to improve the life of the common Karelians and additionally develop their own national identity. The union was temporarily dissolved in 1911 after series of repressions done by the local government.

In 1917, the Murmansk Railroad was built. This has led much of intelligentsia to believe that the Russian tourism and Immigration into the region would rise, leading to further assimilation of the Karelians to the Russian culture.

=== The Russian Civil War ===
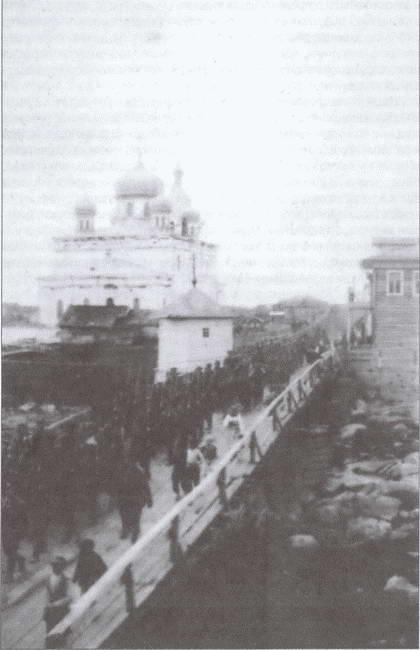
Karelian Legion crossing Kem

Most of the Karelian people in the north of the region, being alienated from the rest of the Russian country by the lakes and marshes, hearing the news of the revolution did not at first mind of it, meanwhile Petrozavodsk was of very revolutionary nature because of being an exile region for political criminals in Tsar's times.

After the October Revolution occurred, Finland declared independence, later recognized by the new government. During the Finnish Civil War, Germans intervened on the side of the Whiteguard. This raised concerns for the rest of Entente powers, and with some of Finnish Whiteguard officers already crossing into Karelia and Cola by themselves, Allied feared that Germans and Finns together could push all Russian forces out of Karelia, Cola and Petersburg, Allies intervened and landed in Murmansk. During that intervention, the Allies occupied the town of Kem, where local Karelians would form up a volunteer Karelian Legion of the British Army.

The allies would push the Finns and Germans out of the Russian borders, but with the main goal of the operation being to distract the German forces being completed, the Intervents left shortly after. This left the Karelian Legion to be, for a brief period of time, the only force in the North Karelian region, becoming the Forest Guerrillas.

The Union of White Karelians, upon receiving the news of the right to self-determination, would attempt to use that right, establishing the Uhtua Committee, but it was suppressed by the local Soviet government and forced to flee to Finland, asking them for aid. The Finns would cross to Uhtua, and declared the Republic of Uhtua, which would be abandoned by the Finnish government in exchange for territories of the Viipuri Province and Petsamo. The Karelians did not organise their own military, and shortly after, the Bolsheviks occupied the town with no resistance. The presence of Bolsheviks in the region would mean for the Bolshevik policies to be active, leading to Prodrazverstka. The local peasantry would then rebel in the East-Karelian uprising. The uprising saw help from the Finns again, but was later defeated by the Red Army.

=== Karelian Labour Commune ===
During the years of its existence, the Commune was actively educating the people, opening the schools and libraries as of the Likbez policy were open and maintained. The Commune was later expanded in 1923 by transferring the Kolezhemskaya, Lapinskaya, Navodnitskaya and many other posads from Archangelsk Gubernia.

In 1923, the Karelian Labour Commune becomes the Karelian Autonomous Soviet Socialist Republic due its de facto large autonomy, with the government of the region directly managing the local economy without having to pay its taxes to the RSFSR's state budget. The formal increase of the autonomy was first vetoed by People's Commissar for Nationalities of the RSFSR Joseph Stalin, but it was later accepted by the Central Committee of the Communist Party of the Soviet Union.

=== Karelian Autonomous Soviet Socialist Republic ===
After the Likbez policy was successfully fulfilled, the Republic now shifted its goal from educating the people to expanding the production and electrifying the Republic according to the GOERLO plan. The first steps were the creation of Mevezegorsky and Pudozsky tree-cutting factories, the Kondopoga Paper Factory, the launch of the Kem and the Uhta Hydroelectrostations.

In the 1930s, the goal yet again shifted, now to improving the cultural and physical development and well-being of the locals by creation of many free clinics and hospitals, "Houses of Physical Education", Theaters, ETC.

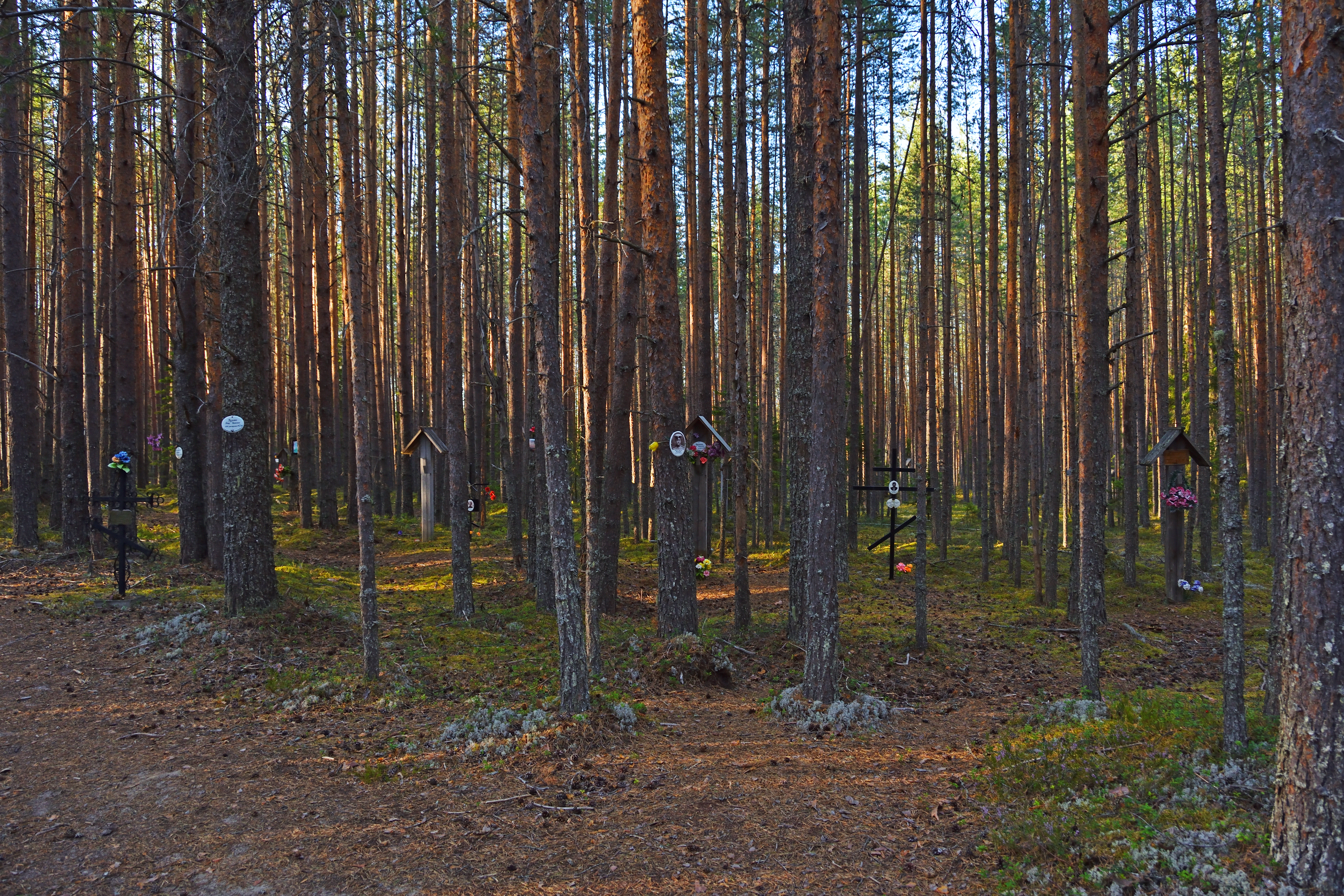
Sandarmokh forest

Many of the Finns who fled to Karelia were, as the part of the Great Purge of 1937, detained and either shot or exiled, with the Karelian Ethnic Finns population dropping to 21%. Karelia has one of the biggest burial sites from the Great Purge in Russia – Sandarmoh, where possibly thousands of victims were executed.

During Soviet Union's first five-year plan (1928 to 1932) tens of thousands of gulag prisoners were used to dig the White Sea–Baltic Canal. In the years of the Stalin's Great Purge (1936 to 1938) around 6,000 people were executed in the woods at Sandormokh near the Solovetsky Islands.

=== World War II ===
Finland had constructed a defensive line in the 1920s and 1930s, the so-called Mannerheim Line. In 1939, the Soviet Union invaded Finland, starting the Winter War, with the goal of annexing Finland. The Soviets failed to achieve this objective, and fighting ended in March 1940 with the signing of the Moscow Peace Treaty. Per the treaty, Finland ceded the eastern half of Finnish Karelia to the Soviet Union. About 400,000 people, virtually the whole population, had to be relocated within Finland. In 1941 Finland attacked the Soviet Union and proceeded to occupy East Karelia. The Finnish military administration in Eastern Karelia administered the region during 1941–1944.

The ceding of the eastern half of Finnish Karelia to the Soviets caused considerable bitterness in Finland, which had lost Viipuri (Finland's second-largest [Population Register] or fourth-largest [Church and Civil Register] city, depending on the census data), its industrial heartland along the River Vuoksi, half of the Saimaa canal that connected central Finland to the Gulf of Finland, and access to the fishing waters of Lake Ladoga (Finnish: Laatokka). An eighth of the Finnish population became displaced refugees, without a chance of return to their Karelian homeland.

=== Post-World War II ===
As a consequence of the peace treaty, the Karelian ASSR was incorporated with the Karelo-Finnish SSR 1941–1956, after which it became an ASSR again. Karelia was the only Soviet republic that was "demoted" from an SSR to an ASSR within the Russian SFR. Unlike autonomous republics, soviets republics had the constitutional right to secede. The possible fear of secession, as well as the Russian ethnic majority in Karelia may have resulted in its "demotion."

With the collapse of USSR in 1991, the ASSR was reorganized into the Republic of Karelia, a subject of the Russian Federation.

The portion of Viipuri Province that remained within Finland existed as Kymi Province from 1945 to 1997. The eastern part of this province is now the region of South Karelia, while the western portion is part of Kymenlaakso.

== See also ==
- Karelian language
- Karelians
- Karelia (historical province of Finland)
- North American Finns in Soviet Karelia
