= Lappee =

- Former municipality
- Lappeen kunta Lappvesi kommun
- Coat of arms

- Location of Lappee in Finland
- Coordinates: 60°51′58″N 28°17′59″E
- Country: Finland
- Province: Kymi Province
- Region: South Karelia
- Merged into Lappeenranta: 1967
- Seat: Vainikkala

Area
  - Land: 574.3 km^{2} (221.7 sq mi)

Population (1966-12-31)
  - Total: 11,906

Lappee is an old parish and a former municipality of Finland in the South Karelia region, originally in Viipuri Province and after the Second World War, Kymi Province. It was consolidated with Lappeenranta in 1967 together with Lauritsala.

Its seat was in Vainikkala near the border with Russia, however the largest settlements were Laihia and Lavola near Lappeenranta and Lauritsala.

The coat of arms depicts Lappee's medieval patron saint, Saint Lawrence (Pyhä Lauri).

== Geography ==
Lappee bordered Lappeenranta, Lauritsala, Joutseno, Nuijamaa, Ylämaa, Luumäki, Lemi and Taipalsaari. It also bordered Vahviala before it was ceded to the Soviet Union.

== Name ==
The original name of Lappee was Lapvesi, which also refers to the southern part of the Saimaa. The current name was formed from the local dialectal declension of the name, e.g. genitive Lapveen > Lappeen (standard Lapveden), later nominalized as Lappee. The lap- element is generally thought to be etymologically connected with the name of Lapland, which may suggest that Sámi people have lived in the area.

The Swedish name Lappvesi as well as the surnames Lapveteläinen and Lappeteläinen are derived from the older name.

== History ==
Municipal mergers of Lappeenranta.

The village of Kauskila was among the most significant Karelian population centers in South Karelia during the Middle Ages. Kauskila has been continuously inhabited for approximately 2,000 years.

Lappee was first mentioned as Lappawesi in 1415, while in 1416, a vicar named Gudmund is mentioned in Lappevesi. These mentions suggest that Lappee was already an independent parish in the early 15th century, however it may also have been active already in the 14th century. The center of the parish was in the village of Kauskila.

The first parish to be separated from Lappee was Taipalsaari in 1571, which also included Lemi, Savitaipale, Suomenniemi and a part of Mäntyharju. In 1639, a part of Lappee was given to the newly established Joutseno parish, mainly separated from Jääski. Luumäki was separated from Lappee in 1642.

The town of Lappeenranta was established in 1652, the name of which literally means "Lappee's coast". Before the town's establishment, the name referred to a marketplace on the shore of Saimaa. The town did not have its own parish until 1913.

In 1903, parts of Lappee were transferred to the new Nuijamaa parish. Lauritsala was the last municipality to be separated completely from Lappee, which happened in 1932. Lappee and Lauritsala were merged into Lappeenranta in 1967. The parishes of Lappee and Lauritsala remained separate.
