= Nikolai von Rechenberg =

Nikolai von Rechenberg was a general serving in the Imperial Russian Army

Nikolai von Rechenberg (4 November 1846 Saint Petersburg – 22 November 1908 Saint Petersburg) was a Finnish lieutenant general serving in the Imperial Russian Army. He was the Governor of Viipuri Province between 1900 and 1902 and for the second time between 1906 and 1907.

== Early life ==
On 4 November 1846 Nikolai von Rechenberg was born in Saint Petersburg to Alexander von Rechenberg and Natalie Alexandrine Stewen-Steinheil. On 16 August 1859 von Rechenberg started studying in Hamina Cadet School. On 12 September 1865 he was transferred to the Page Corps in Saint Petersburg.

== Career ==
After graduating from the Page Corps in 1866 von Rechenberg was promoted to the rank of Sub-lieutenant. He was serving in the Russo-Turkish War and on 24 October 1877 he was wounded during the Battle of Gorni Dubnik.

Von Rechenberg became the Governor of Viipuri Province on 12 January 1900. He had to resign on 22 August 1902 because of the strengthened Russification acts in Finland. He once again became the Governor of Viipuri Province on 20 February 1906 and was given the title of Privy Councillor on 15 April. He retired from his position as the Governor of Viipuri Province in March 1907.
