= Lake Nuijamaa =

Lake in Finland and Russia

Lake Nuijamaa Nuijamaanjärvi
- Location within Finland
- Coordinates: 60.951548°N 28.572714°E
- Basin countries: Finland, Russia

Lake Nuijamaa (Finnish: Nuijamaanjärvi) is a lake on the border between Finland and Russia next to the town of Nuijamaa.

It is part of the Saimaa Canal linking Vyborg Bay in the Baltic Sea to Lake Saimaa in the Finnish Lakeland.
