= Wille Särkkä =

Finnish politician (1877–1968)

Wilhelm Gustaf Särkkä (26 February 1877 in Suomenniemi – 18 April 1968) was a Finnish politician. He was a member of the Parliament of Finland from 1917 to 1929 and again from 1930 to 1936, representing the Young Finnish Party from 1917 to 1918 and the National Progressive Party from 1918 on. He died in Lappeenranta on 18 April 1968.
