= Lesogorsky =

Lesogorsky Лесогорский
- Urban-type settlement
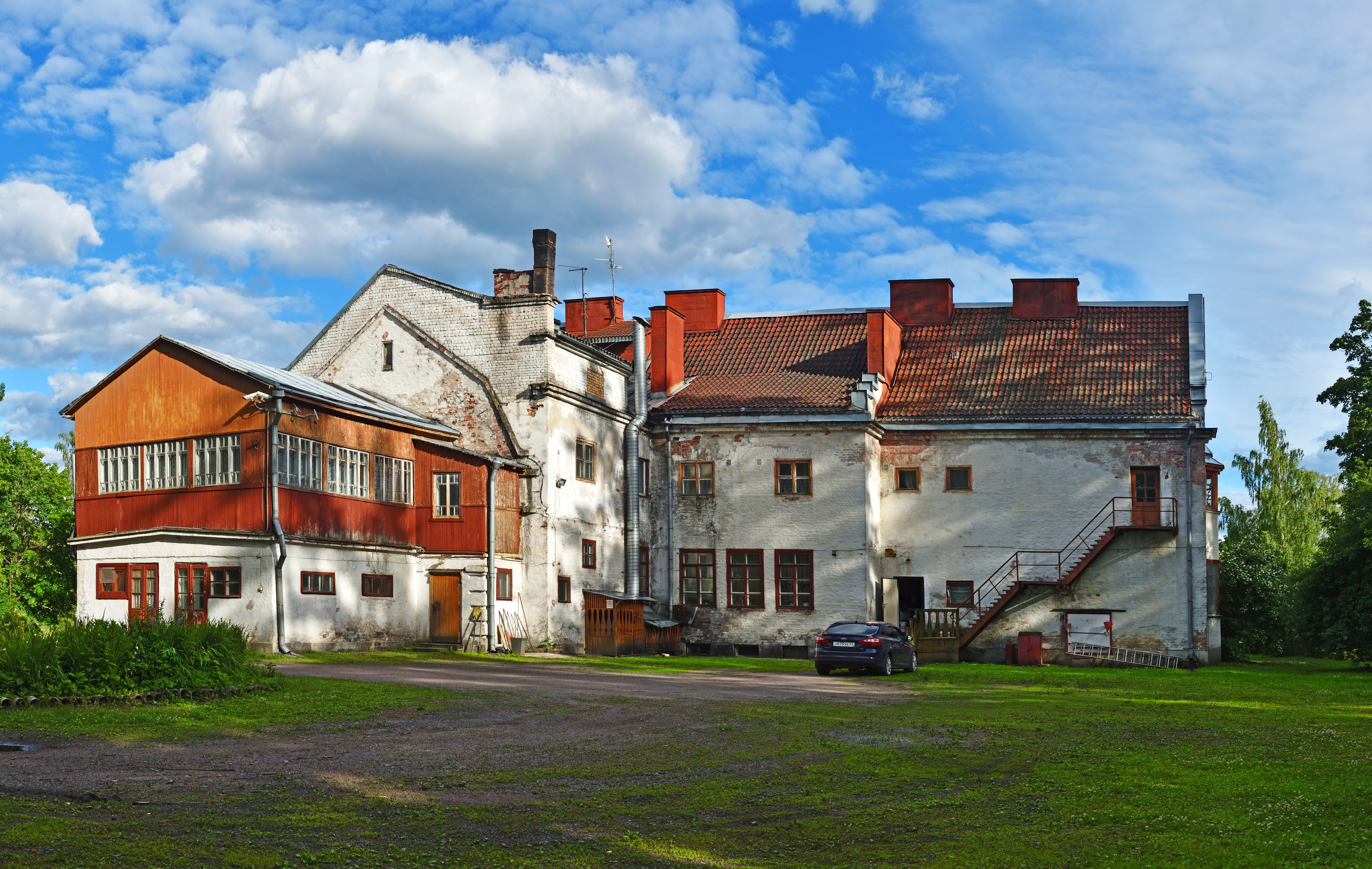
- Valf manor, a building by Uno Ullberg

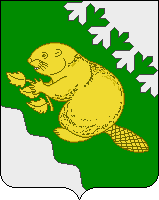
- Coat of arms
- Interactive map of Lesogorsky
- Location of Lesogorsky Lesogorsky (Leningrad Oblast)
- Coordinates: 61°03′N 28°55′E
- Country: Russia
- Federal subject: Leningrad Oblast
- Administrative district: Vyborgsky District
- Urban-type settlement status since: 1940

Population (2010 Census)
  - Total: 3,273
  - Estimate (2024): 3,024 (−7.6%)

Municipal status
  - Municipal district: Vyborgsky Municipal District
  - Urban settlement: Svetogorskoye Urban Settlement
- Time zone: UTC+3 (MSK)
- Postal code: 188961
- OKTMO ID: 41615114056

Lesogorsky (Russian: Лесого́рский; Finnish: Jääski; Swedish: Jäskis) is an urban locality (an urban-type settlement) in Vyborgsky District of Leningrad Oblast, located on the left bank of the Vuoksi River, on the Karelian Isthmus, near the Russia–Finland border, and a station of the Kamennogorsk–Svetogorsk–Imatra railway. Population: 3,273 (2010 census); 3,004 (2002 census); 3,744 (1989 Soviet census).

Municipally, Lesogorsky together with the town of Svetogorsk form Svetogorskoye Urban Settlement of Vyborgsky Municipal District.

== History ==
=== Early history ===
Jääski may have been mentioned in a Russian chronicle from 1137 as an area taxed by the bishop of Novgorod, but this identification has not been confirmed. The first clear mention of Jääski is from 1323, as it was mentioned in the Treaty of Nöteborg as one of the three pogosts given to Sweden by Novgorod, the other two being Äyräpää and Savilahti (Mikkeli). The pogost also included the territories of the later Ruokolahti, Antrea, Kirvu and Vuoksenranta parishes as well as parts of Rautjärvi, Joutseno, Nuijamaa and the Viipuri parish. It is possible that the entire area of what became the Viipuri parish belonged to the Jääski pogost before the construction of the Vyborg Castle. Out of these parishes, the territories of Viipuri, Antrea, Kirvu and Vuoksenranta are now part of Russia while Ruokolahti, Rautjärvi, Joutseno and Nuijamaa are part of Finland.

=== Acquisition by Russia ===
Russia acquired the area in 1721 after the Great Northern War in the Treaty of Nystad. Until 1918 it was a part of Vyborg Governorate, which after 1812 belonged to the Grand Duchy of Finland and was known as the Viipuri Province.

=== Finnish rule ===
Unofficial Finnish coat of arms

In 1917, Finland became independent, and the town became the administrative center of the Jääski municipality, established in 1869, of the Viipuri Province. The industrial area of Enso, later Svetogorsk, was also a part of Jääski.

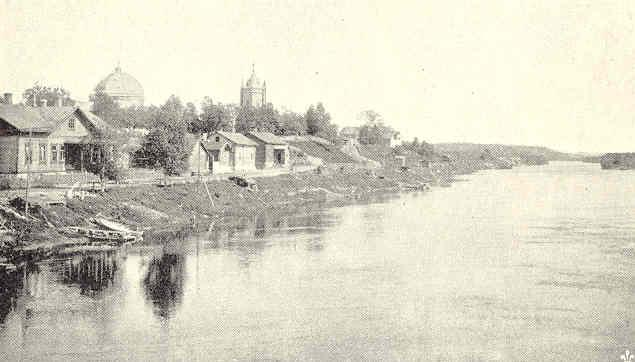
Jääski ca. 1900

=== Soviet and Russian rule ===
The territory had been ceded by Finland to the Soviet Union by the Moscow Peace Treaty as a result of the Winter War. In the border settlement of 1940, 355.5 km^{2} (137.3 sq mi) of Jääski's total area was ceded to the Soviet Union, and 62.7 km^{2} (24.2 sq mi) remained on the Finnish side. It was recaptured by Finns between 1941 and 1944 during the Continuation War but was again ceded to the Soviet Union after the Moscow Armistice. This secession was formalized after signing the Paris Peace Treaty in 1947. The Viipuri Province was divided, with the larger part ceded to Soviet Union and the smaller part remaining in Finland. The population was resettled to Finland, mainly to Elimäki, Anjala and Kuusankoski, while people from Central Russia were resettled to populate the Karelian Isthmus. The northwesternmost parts of the Jääski municipality remained Finnish and were mainly used to form Imatra. Other parts of the municipality were transferred to Joutseno and Ruokolahti.

In March 1940 Yaskinsky District with the administrative center in Jääski was established, and Jääski obtained work settlement status. The district was a part of the Karelian Autonomous Soviet Socialist Republic, after March 31, 1940 of the Karelo-Finnish Soviet Socialist Republic. On November 24, 1944, Yaskinsky District was transferred from Karelo-Finnish Soviet Socialist Republic to Leningrad Oblast. On October 1, 1948 the district was renamed Lesogorsky, and on January 13, 1949 Jääski was renamed Lesogorsky. On December 9, 1960 Lesogorsky District was abolished and merged into Vyborgsky District.

== Economy ==
=== Industry ===
In Lesogorsky, there is a plant producing plastic and fibers. There is a power plant on the Vuoksi.

=== Transportation ===
Lesogorsky is connected by railway with Kamennogorsk, where it has connection to the old Vyborg–Joensuu railroad. There is suburban traffic to Vyborg. The continuation of the railroad beyond Svetogorsk to the state border is disused.

Lesogorsky is connected by roads with Kamennogorsk and Vyborg, as well as with Imatra across the border via Svetogorsk.
