= Nuijamaa =

- former municipality
- Nuijamaan kunta Nuijamaa kommun
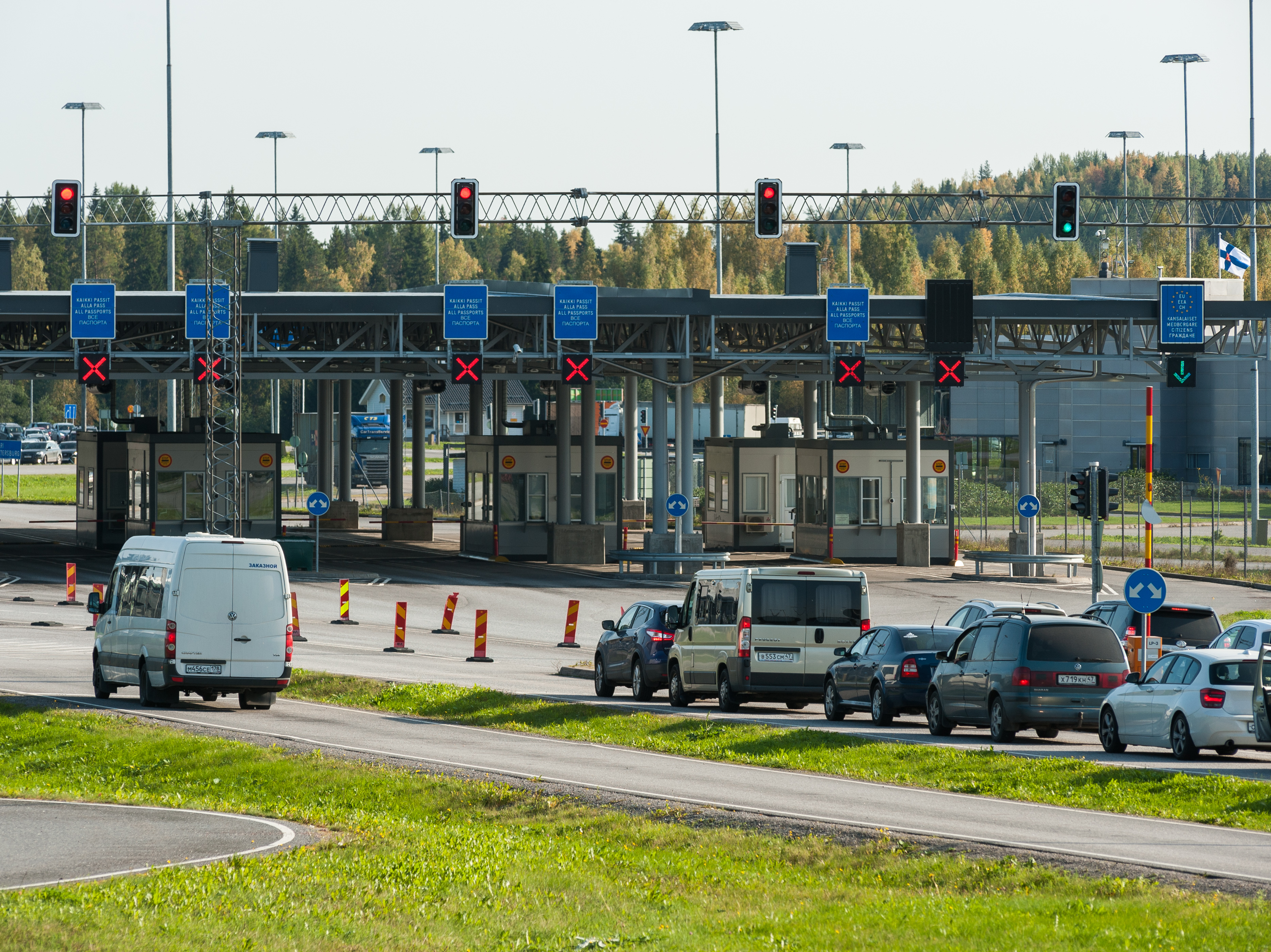
- The car traffic on the Finnish side of the Russian border at the Nuijamaa Border Crossing Point in 2017

- Coat of arms

- Coordinates: 60°57′33.174″N 28°32′53.167″E
- Country: Finland
- Region: South Karelia
- Province: Kymmene län

Area
  - Total: 136 km^{2} (53 sq mi)

Population (1988)
  - Total: 1,199
  - Density: 8.82/km^{2} (22.8/sq mi)
- Time zone: UTC+02:00 (EET)
  - Summer (DST): UTC+03:00 (EEST)

Nuijamaa (Finnish: [ˈnui̯jɑˌmɑː]; literally translated the "club land") is a former municipality in the province of South Karelia in Finland. The municipality had 1,199 inhabitants and an area of 136 km² in 1988. Nuijamaa was a Finnish-speaking municipality. Nuijamaa bordered the municipalities of Lappee, Lappeenranta, Lauritsala, Taipalsaari, Lemi, Luumäki, Ylämaa, and Joutseno. It also shared a border with Russia. It is 26 kilometres (16 mi) from Nuijamaa to the city center of Lappeenranta and 39 kilometres (24 mi) to the medieval town of Vyborg, Russia.

Before the Winter War, Nuijamaa had an area of 356 km^{2} (137 sq mi). With the Continuation War in 1944, 220 km^{2} (85 sq mi) of the municipality was ceded to Russia. In 1975, an international border with Russia opened in Nuijamaa. The total crossings in 2007 were over 1.7 million.

Nuijamaa was incorporated into Lappeenranta in 1989.

== See also ==
- Lake Nuijamaa
- Nuijamaa Church
