= Yashino, Leningrad Oblast =

Rural locality in Vyborgsky District, Russia

Coordinates: 60°47′17″N 28°26′03″E

Yashino (Finnish: Vahviala) is a rural locality (a settlement) in Vyborgsky District of Leningrad Oblast, Russia, located on the Karelian Isthmus.

Before the Winter War and during the Continuation War, it was the center of the Vahviala municipality in the Viipuri Province of Finland. Its name was changed in 1948 from Vahviala to Yashino.
