= Joutseno =

- Former municipality
- Joutsenon kaupunki Joutseno stad
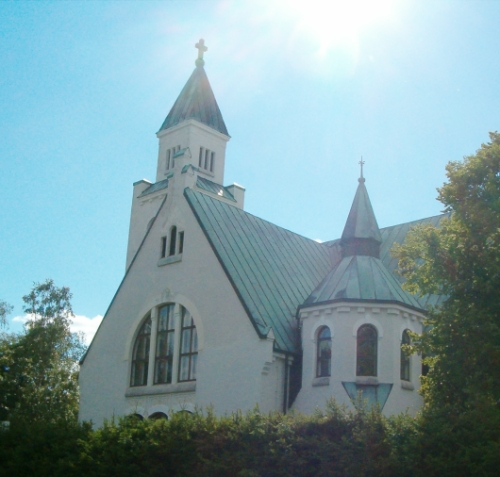
- Joutseno Church.

- Coat of arms

- Location of Joutseno in Finland
- Coordinates: 61.1230340°N 28.5014586°E
- Country: Finland
- Province: Southern Finland Province
- Region: South Karelia
- Established: 1941
- Merged into Lappeenranta: 2009
- Seat: Joutsenon kirkonkylä

Area 498.35
  - Land: 311.2 km^{2} (120.2 sq mi)
  - Water: 187.15 km^{2} (72.26 sq mi)

Population (2008-12-31)
  - Total: 10,659

Joutseno (Finnish pronunciation: [ˈjou̯tseno]) is a former town and municipality of Finland. It is located in the province of Southern Finland and is part of the South Karelia region.

The municipality was unilingually Finnish. Joutseno was consolidated with Lappeenranta on 1 January 2009.

It bordered Lappeenranta, Taipalsaari, Ruokolahti and Imatra, prior to 1967 it bordered Lappee instead of Lappeenranta and prior to 1989 it bordered Nuijamaa. The municipality also had a 9 km border with Russia, more specifically its Vyborgsky District.

== Geography ==
=== Lakes ===
Joutseno is located by Finland's largest lake Saimaa.

== History ==
The name Joutseno is usually connected to the word joutsen meaning "swan" (hence the coat of arms), however it may also refer to joutsi, a dialectal variant of the word jousi, "bow (weapon)", the genitive of which is joutsen.

Joutseno has existed at least since 1544, when it was mentioned as Jousenby as a village of Jääski, which is now a part of Russia as Lesogorsky. Joutseno became a separate parish in 1639 and was originally called Joutsenus. The current name Joutseno has referred to the parish since the 18th century, but became the predominant spelling in the 19th century.

Joutseno became a town in 2005. It was consolidated with Lappeenranta in 2009.

== Places to visit ==
- The Local History Museum
- Joutseno Church
- South Karelian Motor Museum
- The Domestic Animal Park of Korpikeidas
- The storm monument by the library
- Lake Ahvenlampi
- The Myllymäki skiing center

== International relations ==
=== Twin towns — Sister cities ===
Joutseno is twinned with: Säter, Sweden
