= Suomenniemi =

- Former municipality
- Suomenniemen kunta Suomenniemi kommun
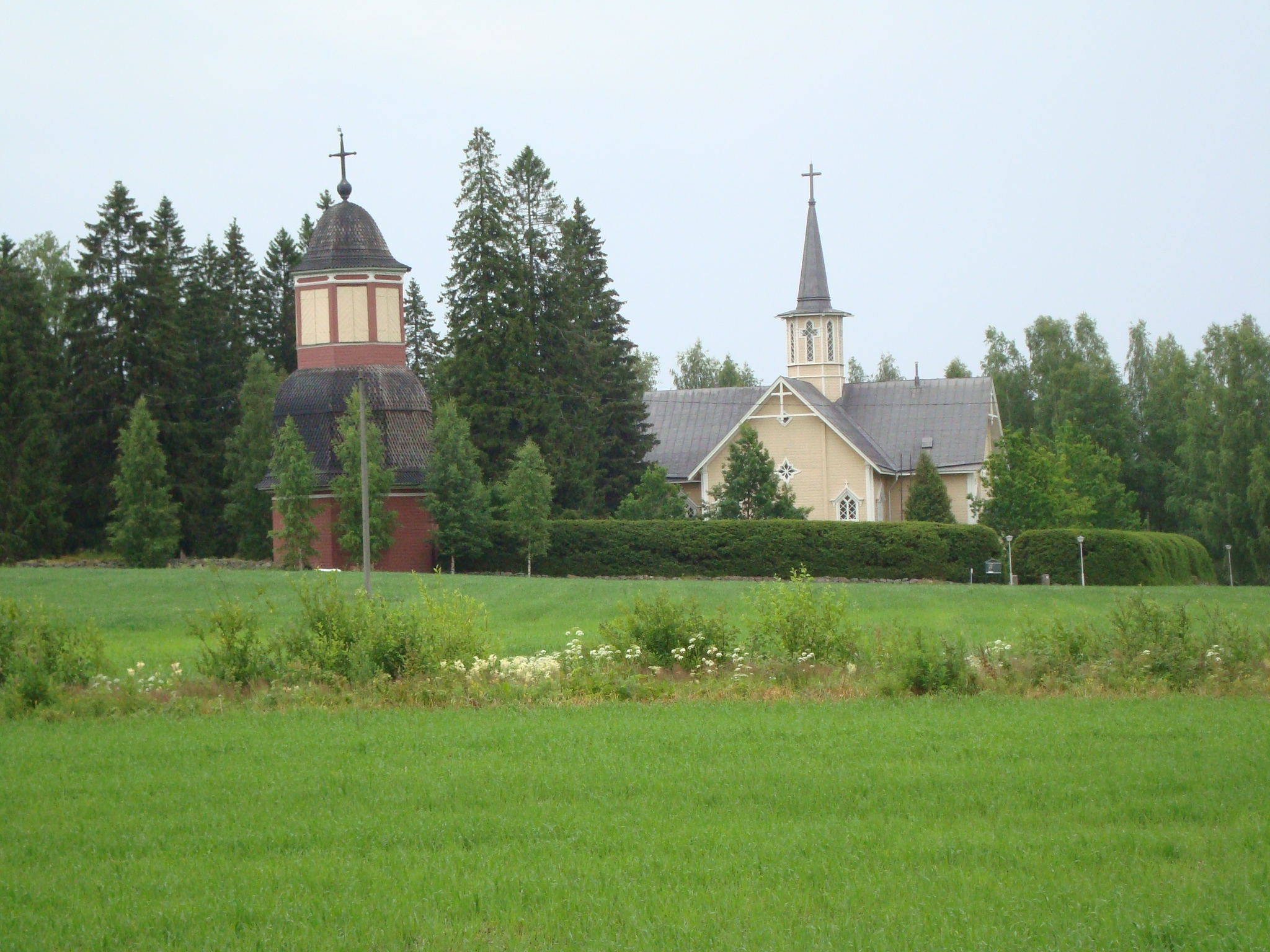
- The church in Suomenniemi

- Coat of arms

- Location of Suomenniemi in Finland
- Coordinates: 61°19.5′N 027°27′E
- Country: Finland
- Region: South Savo
- Consolidated: 2013

Government
  - Municipal manager: Anne Ukkonen

Area
  - Total: 362.96 km^{2} (140.14 sq mi)
  - Land: 283.72 km^{2} (109.54 sq mi)
  - Water: 79.24 km^{2} (30.59 sq mi)

Population (31 December 2012)
  - Total: 763
- Time zone: UTC+2 (EET)
  - Summer (DST): UTC+3 (EEST)
- Website: www.suomenniemi.fi

Suomenniemi is a former municipality of Finland. It was consolidated with Mikkeli on 1 January 2013.

It was located in the province of Southern Finland and was part of the South Karelia region. The municipality had a population of 763 (31 December 2012) and covered an area of 362.96 square kilometres (140.14 sq mi) of which 79.24 km^{2} (30.59 sq mi) is water. The population density is 2.6893/km^{2} (6.965/sq mi). The municipality had the smallest population of the Finnish mainland. With the merger to Mikkeli, Suomenniemi became part of South Savo region and Eastern Finland with regard to state administration.

The municipality was unilingually Finnish.

== History ==
The names of Suomenniemi (literally "peninsula of Finland") and the nearby lake Suomijärvi refer to 13th century settlers from Finland Proper, who were known as suomalaiset while their homeland was called Suomi. Nowadays the Finns proper are known as varsinaissuomalaiset, as the term suomalaiset was extended to all Finnic groups of the Swedish realm.

The village was first mentioned in 1544 as Somenemiby (in a Swedishized form) as a part of the Lappee parish. In 1571 it became a part of the newly founded Taipalsaari parish, while Savitaipale was split off from Taipalsaari in 1639 and Suomenniemi was transferred to it. Suomenniemi became a chapel community in 1689 and a separate parish and municipality in 1866.

In 2013, Suomenniemi was consolidated with Mikkeli.

== People born in Suomenniemi ==
- Wille Särkkä (1877 – 1968)
- Jalmari Rötkö (1892 – 1938)
