= Lemi =

- Municipality
- Lemin kunta Lemi kommun
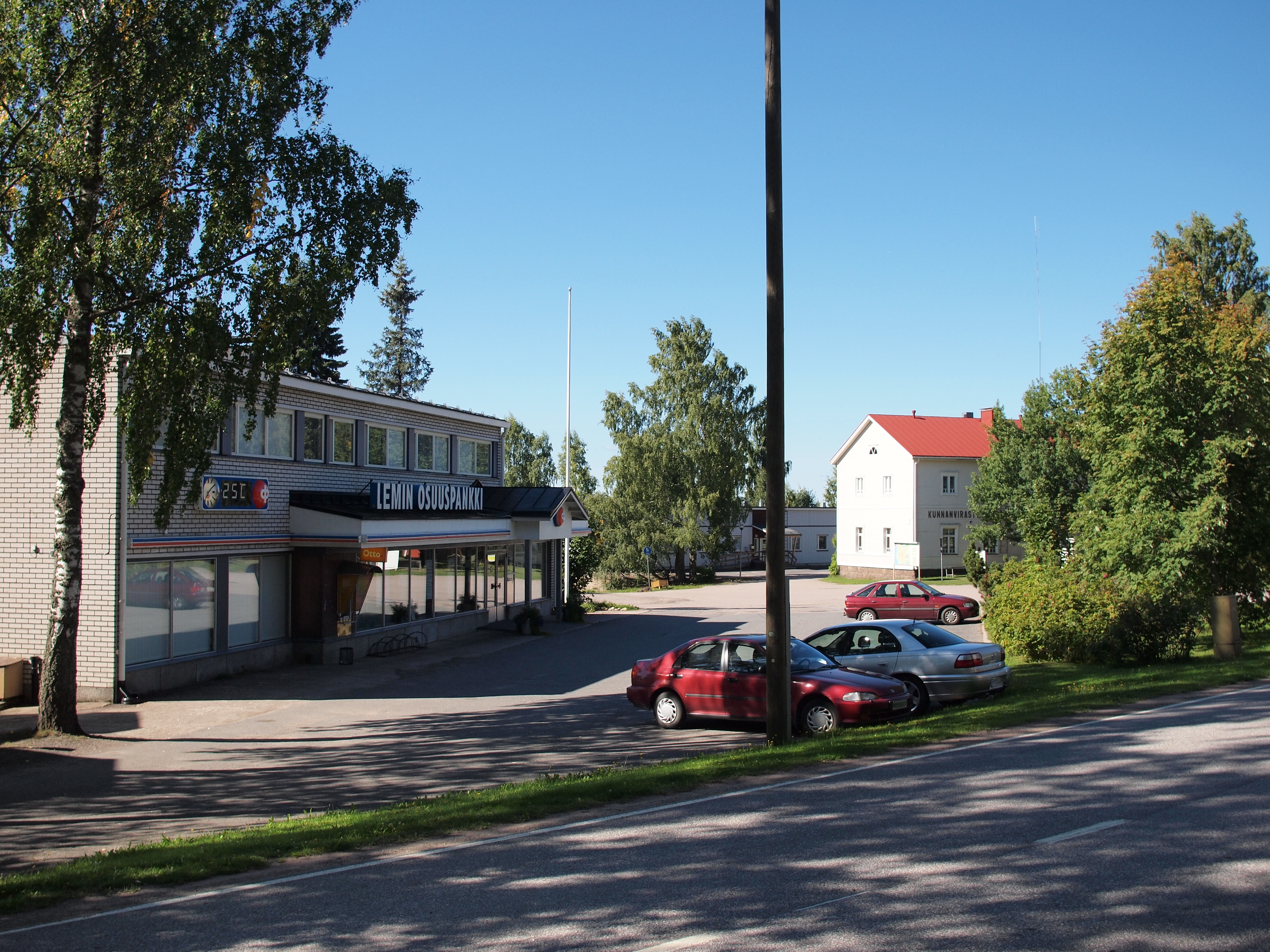
- The center of Lemi

- Coat of arms

- Location of Lemi in Finland
- Interactive map of Lemi
- Coordinates: 61°03.7′N 027°48.3′E
- Country: Finland
- Region: South Karelia
- Sub-region: Lappeenranta sub-region
- Charter: 1688
- Municipality: 1867

Government
  - Municipal manager: Simo Luukkanen

Area (2018-01-01)
  - Total: 262.48 km^{2} (101.34 sq mi)
  - Land: 217.96 km^{2} (84.15 sq mi)
  - Water: 44.71 km^{2} (17.26 sq mi)
  - Rank: 255th largest in Finland

Population (2025-12-31)
  - Total: 2,878
  - Rank: 220th largest in Finland
  - Density: 13.2/km^{2} (34/sq mi)

Population by native language
  - Finnish: 97.5% (official)
  - Others: 2.5%

Population by age
  - 0 to 14: 17.3%
  - 15 to 64: 56.8%
  - 65 or older: 25.8%
- Time zone: UTC+02:00 (EET)
  - Summer (DST): UTC+03:00 (EEST)
- Climate: Dfc
- Website: lemi.fi/in-english/

Lemi is a municipality of Finland. It is located in the South Karelia region. The municipality has a population of 2,878 (31 December 2025), which make it the smallest municipality in South Karelia in terms of population. It covers an area of 262.48 square kilometres (101.34 sq mi) of which 44.71 km^{2} (17.26 sq mi) is water. The population density is 13.2 inhabitants per square kilometre (34/sq mi).

The municipality is unilingually Finnish. The Finnish thrash metal band Stam1na is from Lemi. In 2018 Lemi won the title "heavy metal capital of the world," a title that was determined by number of bands per capita. Lemi had 13 recognised bands. Due to Lemi only having just 3,076 inhabitants at the time, it won with a ratio of 422.6 bands per 100,000 inhabitants.

== Geography ==
The municipal center of Lemi is Juvola. The other villages are Ahtiala, Hakulila, Heikkilä, Huttula, Hyvärilä, Iitiä, Juuresaho (prev. Remunen), Juvola, Kaamanniemi, Kuukanniemi, Kapiala, Keskisenpää, Korpela, Kurkela, Kärmeniemi, Laakkola, Lavola, Merenlahti, Metsola, Mikkola, Mikonharju, Nisola, Nuppola, Olkkonen, Parkkola, Pöllölä, Ruohiala, Ruomi, Sairala, Sorvarila, Suomalainen, Suoniala, Suontakainen, Sutela, Taipale, Tevaniemi, Torvenniemi, Tuomelanpelto (partly belongs to Iitiä), Uiminniemi, Urola, Vainikkala, Välikangas and Värtölä.

The schools are in Juvola and Kuukanniemi. There are about 750 inhabitants in Kuukanniemi and the villages it affects.

== History ==
=== Independence ===
Lemi has been founded in 1688 as an independent Evangelical Lutheran parish. Due to the secularization of the local governments according to the decree of 1865, the secular local government was separated from the clerical in 1867 as the municipality of Lemi.

=== War time ===
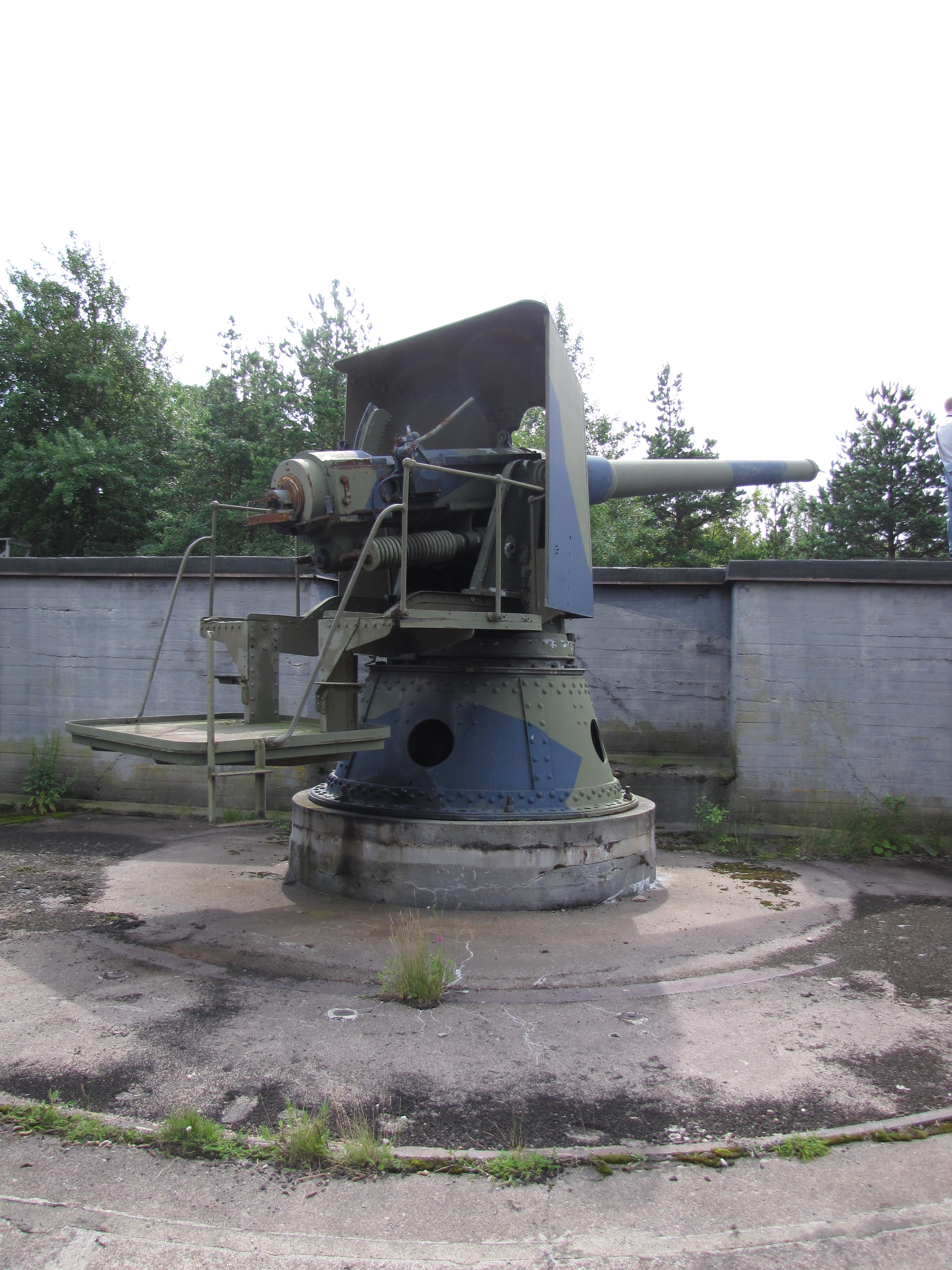
A Canet 152/45-C naval gun in Kuivasaari

Some fighting took place in the cemetery of Lemi during the civil war in 1918. After the Winter War as the military hardware had to be displaced from the territories to be given to the Soviet Union on the basis of the Moscow Armistice, naval artillery was brought to Lemi to create part of the Salpa Line. From the Käkisalmi region the Vahtiniemi battery was transferred to Kärmeniemi consisting of two Canet 152/45-C naval guns. Later, on 11 July 1941, they were taken to Antamoinen to be tested on 22 July. Four days later they were transported by train from Lappeenranta again near Käkisalmi to Vahtiniemi to become operational 9 September 1941. After the Continuation War the 32nd heavy battery brought only one of the two Canet 152/45-C's it had as the other was to repaired. By the end of November 1944 the 32nd heavy battery was dissolved and the guns were sent to Parola.

After the war there has not been naval guns in Lemi, but the remaining positions can be seen both in Kärmeniemi and Juvola.

== Attractions ==
Name	Place	Description	WGS 84
The Evangelical Lutheran Church of Lemi			
Juvolan mörssäripatteri – The mortar battery of Juvola	Juvola	The partly restored position of four positions of the 280 mm mortar of the year 1877. The four mortars are destroyed after the Continuation War. The battery has been a part of the Salpa Line	
Kärmeniemen patteri – The battery of Kärmeniemi	Juvola	The position of two Canet 152/45 C guns. The guns are displaced The battery has been a part of the Salpa Line	

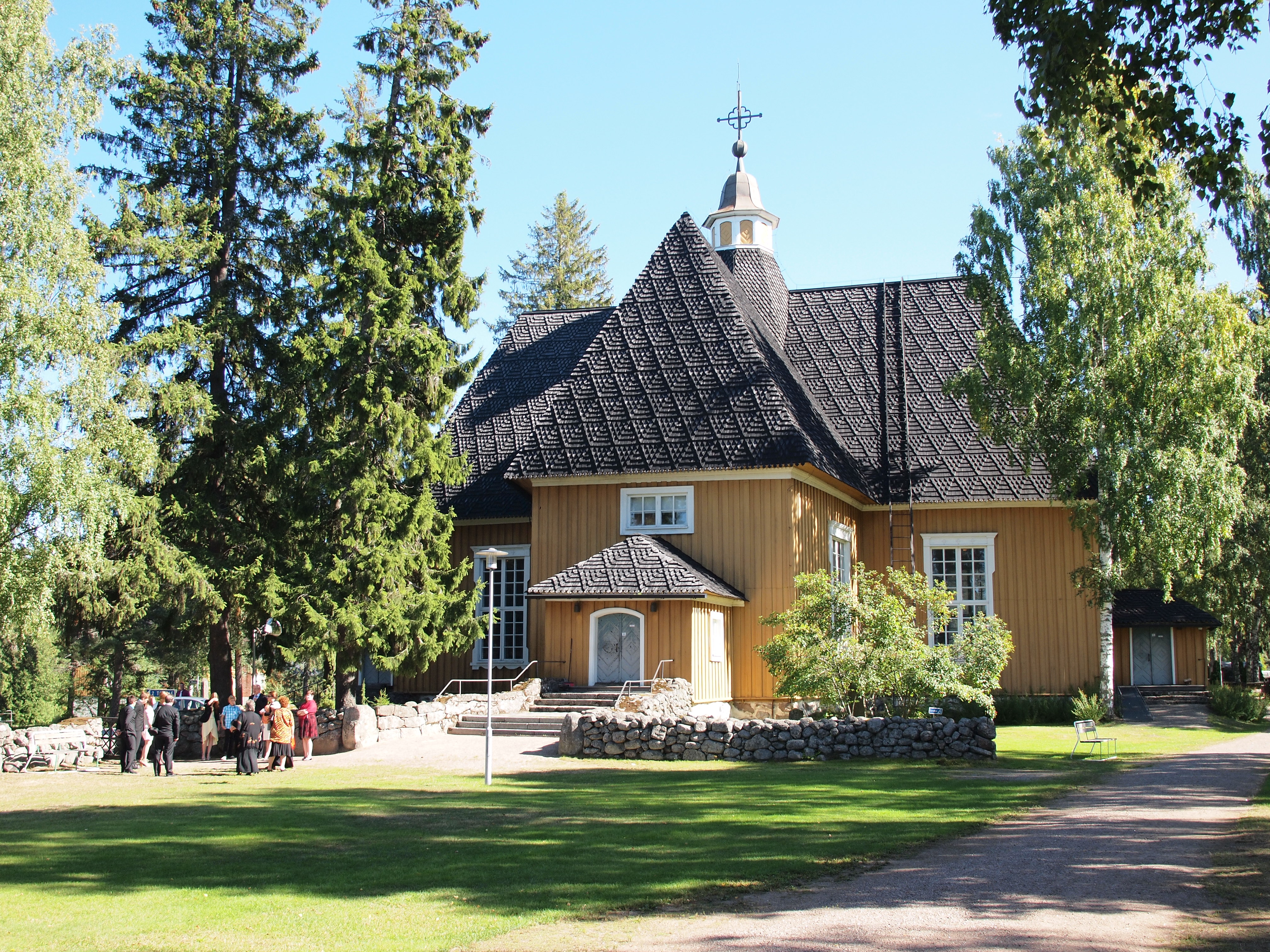
Lemi church

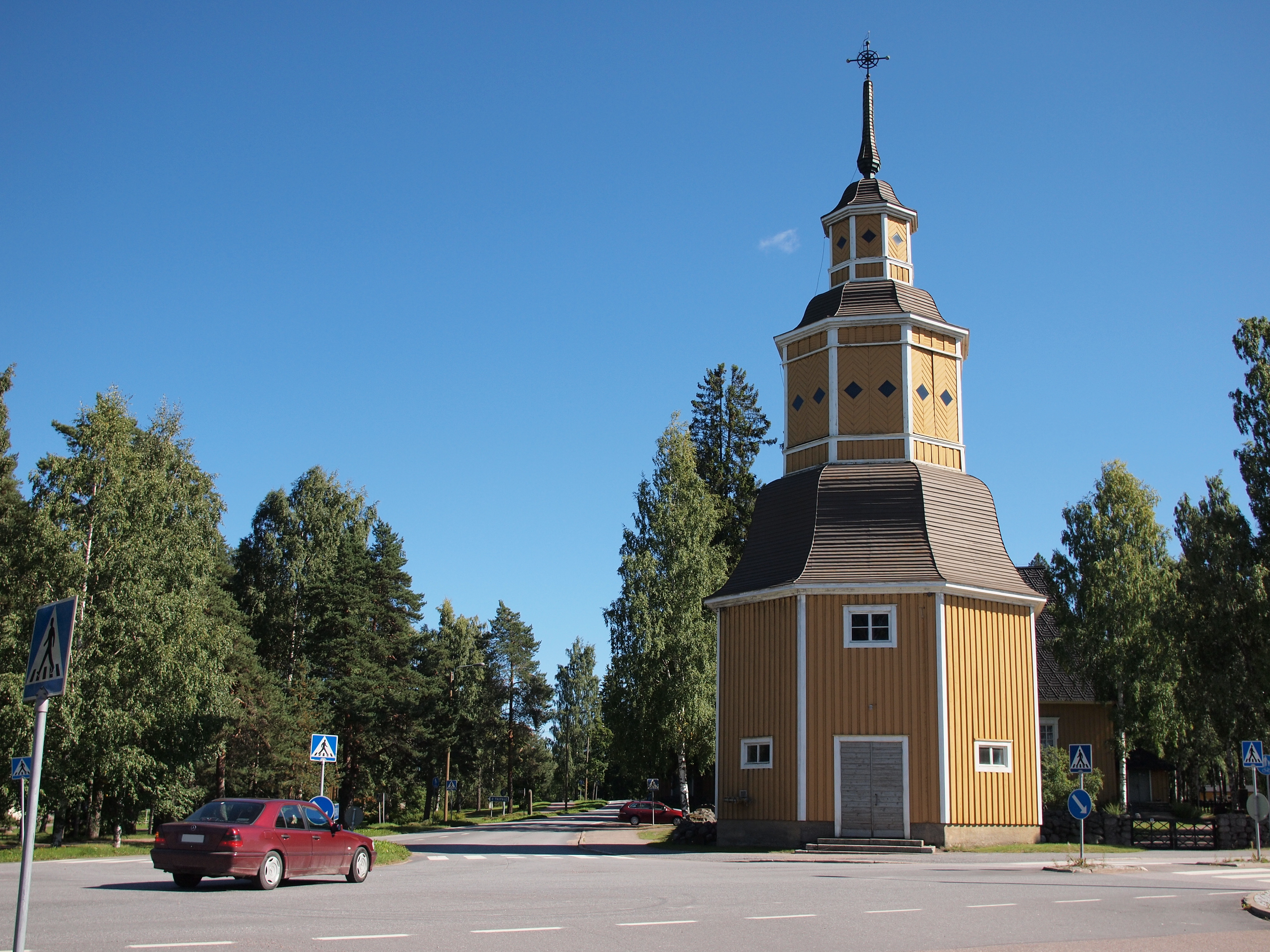
Bell tower in Lemi's center

== Notable individuals ==
- Elias Muukka, painter
- Mirja Hietamies, Olympic champion cross-country skier
- Stam1na, thrash metal band
