= Ylämaa =

- Former municipality
- Ylämaan kunta Ylämaa kommun
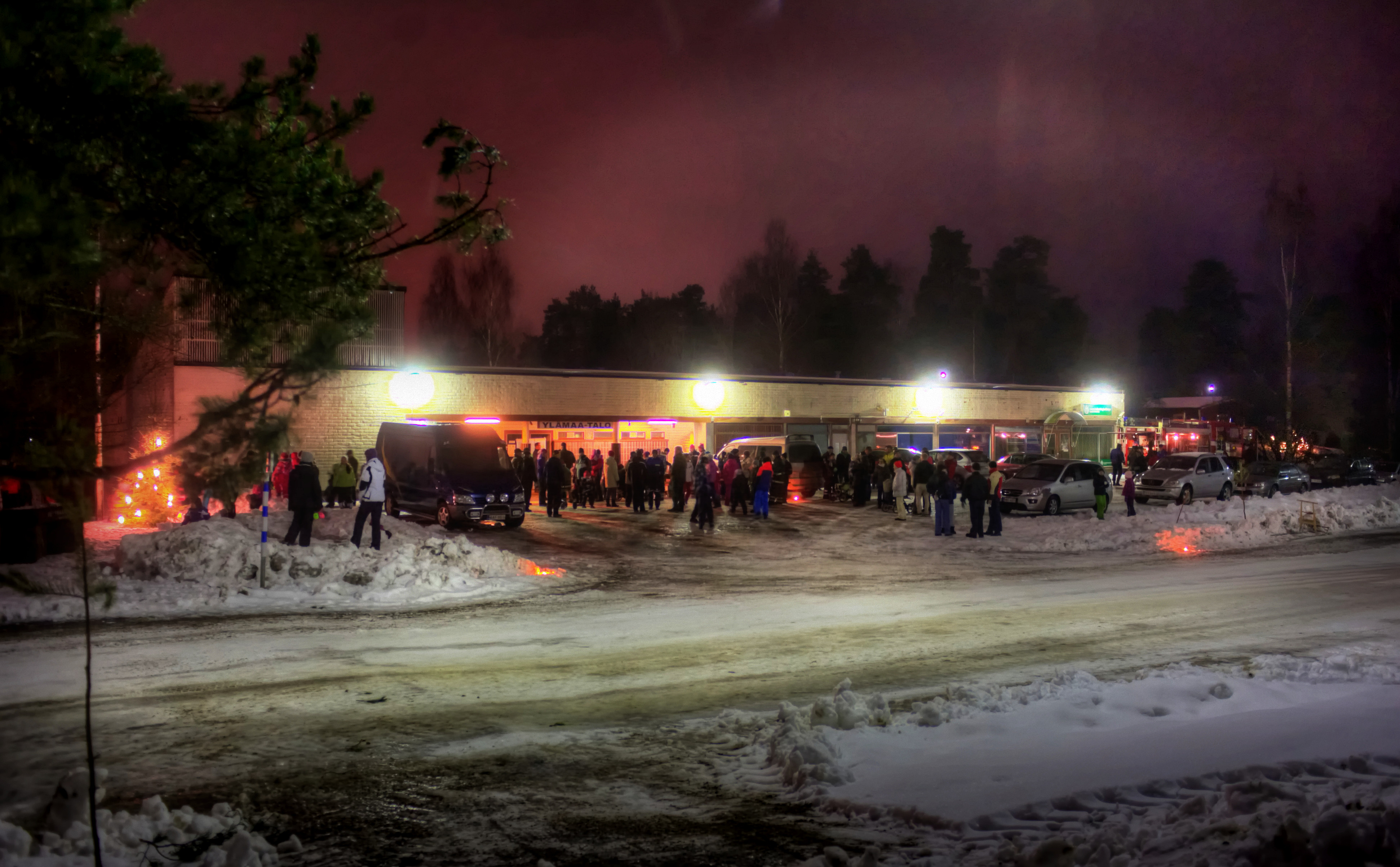
- Ylämaa Town Hall

- Coat of arms

- Location of Ylämaa in Finland
- Coordinates: 60°48′N 028°00.5′E
- Country: Finland
- Region: South Karelia
- Sub-region: Lappeenranta sub-region
- Charter: 1925
- Consolidated: 2010

Government
  - Municipal manager: Esko Hämäläinen

Area
  - Total: 408.94 km^{2} (157.89 sq mi)
  - Land: 379.75 km^{2} (146.62 sq mi)
  - Water: 29.19 km^{2} (11.27 sq mi)

Population (2009-12-31)
  - Total: 1,408
- Time zone: UTC+2 (EET)
  - Summer (DST): UTC+3 (EEST)
- Climate: Dfb
- Website: www.ylamaa.fi

Ylämaa (Finnish: [ˈylæˌmɑː]; literally translated the "Highland") is a former municipality of Finland, located in the province of Southern Finland as part of the South Karelia region. It was consolidated with Lappeenranta on January 1, 2010.

The municipality had a population of 1,408 (31 December 2009) and covers an area of 408.94 square kilometres (157.89 sq mi) of which 29.19 km^{2} (11.27 sq mi) is water. The population density is 3.71 inhabitants per square kilometre (9.6/sq mi). The municipality was unilingually Finnish.

There is a strong concentration of the spectrolite in the region of Ylämaa, which is well-known for gemstones and minerals. Plans to build a pyramid in Ylämaa have existed since 1998, but as of 2010 the project has been on hold due to the high cost.
