= Provincial Governors of Finland =

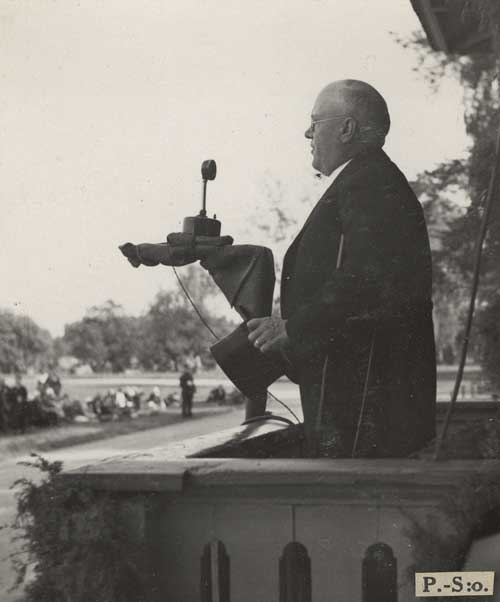
Gustaf Ignatius, governor of Kuopio province

The governor (Finnish: Maaherra, or Swedish: Landshövding) of a province of Finland headed the activities of the State Provincial Office (Finnish: Lääninhallitus, or Swedish: Länsstyrelse) until the end of 2009, when the provinces were abolished. The governors were appointed by the President. Many former ministers including but not limited to Kaarlo Hillilä, Martti Miettunen, Hannele Pokka and Anneli Taina served as governors, since the post was regarded as prestigious enough for a retiring minister, but still politically neutral. The title of maaherra was also considered a personal title, such that once appointed, the title maaherra remained for life.

During the Swedish period (1634–1809) and the Russian period (1809–1917) the governor was a royal plenipotentiary, representing the sovereign, but with independence, the function was reversed: the governor represented his territory to the central government.

== List of Provincial Governors ==
=== Province of Turku and Pori 1634–1997 ===
- Bror Rålamb 1634–1637
- Melkior von Falkenberg 1637–1641
- Melkior von Falkenberg 1641–1642 (Province of Åbo)
- Knut Lillienhöök 1642–1646 (Province of Åbo)
- No governor 1641–1646 (Province of Björneborg)
- Knut Lillienhöök 1647–1648
- Lorentz Creutz (elder) 1649–1655
- Erik von der Linde 1655–1666
- Ernst Johan Creutz (elder) 1666
- Harald Oxe 1666–1682
- Lorenz Creutz (younger) 1682–1698
- Jakob Bure 1698–1706
- Justus von Palmberg 1706–1714
- Johan Stiernstedt 1711–1713 (acting) and 1714–1722
- Otto Reinhold Yxkull 1722–1746
- Lars Johan Ehrenmalm 1744–1747 (acting) and 1747–1749
- Johan Georg Lillienberg 1749–1757
- Jeremias Wallén 1757–1768
- Kristoffer Johan Rappe 1769–1776
- Fredrik Ulrik von Rosen 1776–1781
- Nils Fredenskiöld 1780 (acting)
- Magnus Wilhelm Armfelt 1782–1790
- Joakim von Glan 1790–1791 (acting)
- Ernst Gustaf von Willebrand 1790–1806
- Olof Wibelius 1801–1802 (acting)
- Knut von Troil 1806–1816
- Otto Herman Lode 1811–1813 (acting)
- Carl Erik Mannerheim 1816–1826
- Lars Gabriel von Haartman 1820–1822 (acting)
- Eric Wallenius 1822–1826 (acting) and 1826–1828
- Adolf Broberg 1828–1831
- Lars Gabriel von Haartman 1831–1842
- Gabriel Anton Cronstedt 1840–1842 (acting) and 1842–1856
- Samuel Werner von Troil 1856 (acting)
- Carl Fabian Langenskiöld 1856–1858
- Selim Mohamed Ekbom 1857–1858 (acting)
- Johan Axel Cedercreutz 1858–1863 (acting) and 1863
- Carl Magnus Creutz 1864–1866 (acting) and 1866–1889
- Axel Gustaf Samuel von Troil 1889–1891
- Wilhelm Theodor von Kraemer 1891–1903
- Theodor Hjalmar Lang 1903–1905
- Knut Gustaf Nikolai Borgenström 1905–1911
- Eliel Ilmari Wuorinen 1911–1917
- Albert Alexander von Hellens 1917 (acting)
- Kaarlo Collan 1917–1922
- Ilmari Helenius 1922–1932
- Wilho Kyttä 1932–1949
- Erkki Härmä 1949–1957
- Esko Kulovaara 1957–1971
- Sylvi Siltanen 1972–1977
- Paavo Aitio 1977–1985
- Pirkko Työläjärvi 1985–1997

=== Province of Nyland and Tavastehus 1634–1831 ===
- Arvid Göransson Horn af Kanckas 1634–1640
- Arvid Göransson Horn af Kanckas 1640–1648 (Province of Tavastehus)
- Reinhold Mettstake 1640–1642 (Province of Nyland)
- Jacob Uggla 1642–1648 (Province of Nyland)
- Erik Andersson Oxe 1648–1652
- Ernst Johan Greutz 1652–1666
- Udde Knutsson Ödell 1666–1668
- Axel Eriksson Stålarm 1668–1678
- Axel Rosenhane 1678–1685
- Jonas Klingstedt 1685–1687
- Karl Bonde 1687–1695
- Mårten Lindhielm 1695–1696
- Abraham Cronhjort 1696–1703
- Johan Creutz 1703–1719
- Per Stierncrantz 1719–1737
- Axel Erik Gyllenstierna af Lundholm 1737–1746
- Gustaf Samuel Gylleborg 1746–1756
- Anders Johan Nordenskjöld 1756–1761
- Hans Erik Boije af Gennäs 1761–1772
- Carl Ribbing af Koberg 1773
- Anders Henrik Ramsay 1774–1776
- Anders de Bruce 1777–1786
- Carl Gustaf Armfelt 1787–1788
- Johan Henrik Munck 1790–1809
- Gustaf Fredrik Stiernwall 1810–1815
- Gustaf Hjärne 1816–1828
- Carl Klick 1828–1831

=== Province of Ostrobothnia 1634–1775 ===
- Melcher Wernstedt 1635–1642
- Hans Kyle 1642–1648 (Province of Vasa)
- Erik Soop 1644–1648 (Province of Uleåborg)
- Hans Kyle 1648–1650
- Ture Svensson Ribbing 1650–1654
- Johan Graan 1654–1668
- Jacob Duwall 1668–1669
- Johan Graan 1669–1674
- Didrik Wrangel af Adinal 1674–1685
- Gustaf Grass 1685–1694
- Johan Nilsson Ehrenskiöldh 1694–1706
- Johan Stiernstedt 1706 (acting)
- Lorentz Clerk 1706–1720
- Reinhold Wilhelm von Essen 1720–1732
- Carl Henrik Wrangel af Adinal 1732
- Broor Rålamb 1733–1734
- Carl Frölich 1734–1739
- Gustaf Creutz 1739–1746
- Gustaf Abraham Piper 1746–1761
- Gustaf von Grooth 1761–1762
- Carl Sparre 1763
- Fredrik Henrik Sparre 1763
- Lorentz Johan Göös 1763–1774
- Fredrik Magnus von Numers 1774 (acting)

=== Province of Viborg and Nyslott 1634–1721 ===
- Åke Eriksson Oxenstierna 1634–1637
- Erik Gyllenstierna 1637–1641
- Karl Mörner 1641–1644 (Province of Viborg)
- Johan Rosenhane 1644–1650 (Province of Viborg)
- Herman Fleming 1641–1645 (Province of Nyslott)
- Mikael von Jordan 1645–1650 (Province of Nyslott)
- Johan Rosenhane 1650–1655
- Axel Axelsson Stålarm 1655–1656
- Anders Koskull 1656–1657
- Erik Kruse 1657–1658
- Jakob Törnsköld 1658–1667
- Conrad Gyllenstierna 1667–1674
- Fabian Wrede 1675–1681
- Carl Falkenberg 1681–1686
- Anders Lindhielm 1689–1704
- Georg Lybecker 1705–1712

=== Province of Kexholm 1634–1721 ===
- Henrik Månsson 1634–1636
- Magnus Nieroth 1636–1641
- Henrik Piper 1641–1642 (acting)
- Reinhold Mettstake 1642–1652
- Jakob Törnsköld 1652–1656
- Karl von Scheiding 1657–1660
- Patrick Ogilwie 1660–1674
- Berendt Mellin 1674–1690

=== Province of Kymmenegård and Nyslott 1721–1747 ===
- Johan Henrik Friesenheim 1721–1737
- Joachim von Dittmer 1738–1741
- Carl Johan Stiernstedt 1741–1746

=== Province of Savolax and Kymmenegård 1747–1775 ===
- Henrik Jacob Wrede af Elimä 1747–1753
- Anders Johan Nordenskjöld 1753–1756
- Otto Wilhelm De Geer 1757–1765
- Anders Henrik Ramsay 1765–1774

=== Province of Vaasa 1775–1997 ===
- Bror Cederström 1775–1785
- Adolf Tandefeldt 1785–1794
- Carl Fridrik Krabbe 1794–1805
- Magnus Wanberg 1805–1808
- Nils Fredric von Schoultz 1808
- Carl Constantin de Carnall 1808–1822
- Herman Henrik Wärnhjelm 1822–1830
- Gustaf Magnus Armfelt 1830–1832
- Carl Gustaf von Mannerheim 1832–1833 (acting) and 1833–1834
- Carl Olof Cronstedt 1834–1837 (acting) and 1837–1845
- John Ferdinand Bergenheim 1845–1847
- Berndt Federley 1847–1854
- Alexander von Rechenberg 1854–1858
- Otto Leonard von Blom 1858–1861
- Carl Gustaf Fabian Wrede 1862–1863 (acting) and 1863–1884
- Viktor Napoleon Procopé 1884–1888
- August Alexander Järnefelt 1888–1894
- Fredrik Waldemar Schauman 1894–1898
- Gustaf Axel von Kothen 1898–1900
- Fredrik Geronimo Björnberg 1900–1903
- Theodor Knipovitsch 1903–1906
- Kasten Fredrik Ferdinand de Pont 1906–1910
- Bernhard Otto Widnäs 1910–1913
- Nikolai Sillman 1913–1916
- Leo Aristides Sirelius 1916–1917
- Juho Torppa 1917 (acting)
- Teodor August Heikel 1917–1920
- Bruno Sarlin 1920–1930
- Erik Heinrichs 1930
- Kaarlo Martonen 1930–1938
- Jalo Lahdensuo 1938–1943
- Toivo Tarjanne 1943–1944
- K. G. R. Ahlbäck 1944–1967
- Martti Viitanen 1967–1977
- Antti Pohjonen 1977–1978
- Mauno Kangasniemi 1978–1991
- Tom Westergård 1991–1997

=== Province of Oulu 1775–2009 ===
- Carl Magnus Jägerhorn 1775–1782
- Adolf Tandefelt 1782–1785
- Johan Fredrik Carpelan 1785–1800
- Samuel af Forselles 1800–1802
- Adolf Edelsvärd 1802–1804
- Jakob Daniel Lange 1805–1808
- Carl Henrik Ehrenstolpe 1809–1820
- Samuel Fredrik von Born 1820–1826
- Johan Abraham Stjernschantz 1826–1834
- Robert Wilhelm Lagerborg 1834–1849
- Alexander Lavonius 1849–1862
- George von Alfthan 1862–1873
- Otto Nyberg 1873–1879
- Carl Johan Jägerhorn 1878–1883
- Carl Adolf Tamelander 1883–1884
- Johan Gabriel Masalin 1884–1886
- Johan Axel Gripenberg 1886–1889
- Anders Johan Malmgrén 1889–1897
- Gustaf Esaias Fellman 1897–1901
- Edvard Furuhjelm 1901–1903
- Otto Savander 1903–1905
- Guido Gadolin 1905–1911
- Hjalmar Langinkoski 1911–1915
- Axel Fabian af Enehjelm 1915–1917
- Matts von Nandelstadh 1917–1925
- Eero Pehkonen 1925–1948
- Kaarle Määttä 1949–1967
- Niilo Ryhtä 1967–1973
- Erkki Haukipuro 1973–1986
- Ahti Pekkala 1986–1991
- Eino Siuruainen 1991–2009

=== Province of Kymmenegård 1775–1831 ===
- Gustaf Riddercreutz 1774–1783
- Robert Wilhelm de Geer af Tervik 1783–1789
- Otto Wilhelm Ramsay 1789–1792
- Herman af Låstbom 1793
- Otto Wilhelm Ramsay 1793
- Johan Herman Lode 1793–1810
- Fredrik Adolf Jägerhorn af Spurila 1810–1812
- Anders Gustaf Langenskiöld 1812–1827
- Adolf Broberg 1827–1828
- Erik Wallenius 1828
- Abraham Joakim Molander 1828–1831

=== Province of Savolax and Karelia 1775–1831 ===
- Otto Ernst Boije 1775–1781
- Georg Henrik von Wrigh 1781–1786
- Simon Vilhelm Carpelan 1786–1791
- Anders Johan Ramsay 1791–1803
- Eric Johan von Fieandt 1803
- Olof Wibelius 1803–1809
- Simon Vilhelm Carpelan 1809–1810
- Gustaf Aminoff 1810–1827
- Carl Klick 1828–1829
- Lars Sacklen 1829–1831

=== Province of Viipuri 1812–1945 ===
- Carl Johan Stjernvall 1812–1815
- Carl Johan Walleen 1816–1820
- Otto Wilhelm Klinckowström 1820–1821 (acting) and 1821–1825
- Carl August Ramsay 1825–1827 (acting) and 1827–1834
- Carl Gustaf von Mannerheim 1834–1839
- Fredric Stewen 1839–1844
- Casimir von Kothen 1844–1846 (acting) and 1846–1853
- Alexander Thesleff 1853–1856
- Bernhard Indrenius 1856–1866
- Christian Theodor Åker-Blom 1866–1882
- Woldemar von Daehn 1882–1885
- Sten Carl Tudeer 1885–1888 (acting) and 1888–1889
- Johan Axel Gripenberg 1889–1899
- Nikolai von Rechenberg 1900–1902
- Nikolai Mjasojedov 1902–1905
- Konstantin Kazansky 1905 (acting) and 1905
- Mikael von Medem 1905–1906 (acting)
- Nikolai von Rechenberg 1906-1907
- Birger Gustaf Samuel von Troil 1907–1910
- Frans Carl Fredrik Josef von Pfaler 1910–1917
- Antti Hackzell 1918–1920
- Lauri Kristian Relander 1920–1925
- Arvo Manner 1925–1945

=== Province of Uusimaa 1831–1997 ===
- Johan Ulrik Sebastian Gripenberg 1831
- Gustaf Magnus Armfelt 1832–1847
- Johan Mauritz Nordenstam 1847–1858
- Samuel Henrik Antell 1858–1862
- Vladimir Alfons Walleen 1862–1869
- Theodor Thilén 1869–1873
- Georg von Alfthan 1873–1888
- Victor Napoleon Procopé 1888
- Hjalmar Georg Palin 1888–1897
- Kasten de Pont 1897–1900
- Mikhail Nikiforovitsh Kaigorodoff 1901–1905
- Anatol Anatolievitsch Rheinbott 1905
- Alexander Lvovsky 1905–1906
- Max Theodor Alfthan 1906–1910
- Eugraf Nyman 1910–1917
- Bernhard Otto Widnäs 1913–1917
- Bruno Jalander 1917–1932
- Ilmari Helenius 1932–1944
- Armas-Eino Martola 1944–1946
- Väinö Meltti 1946–1964
- Reino Lehto 1964–1966
- Kaarlo Pitsinki 1966–1982
- Jacob Söderman 1982–1989
- Eva-Riitta Siitonen 1990–1996
- Pekka Silventoinen 1996–1997

=== Province of Häme 1831–1997 ===
- Carl Klick 1831
- Jakob Snellman 1831 (acting)
- Johan Fredrik Stichaeus 1831–1841
- Carl Otto Rehbinder 1841–1863
- Samuel Werner von Troil 1863–1865
- Clas Herman Molander 1865–1869
- Hjalmar (Sebastian) Nordenstreng 1870–1875
- Edvard (Reinhold) von Ammondt 1875–1887
- Torsten Costiander 1887–1895
- Edvard Boehm 1895–1899
- Gustaf Axel von Kothen 1900–1901
- Isidor Svertschkoff 1901–1904
- Alexander Pappkoff 1904–1906
- Ivar (Sune) Gordie 1906–1910
- Arthur Brofeldt 1910–1911 (acting)
- Rafael Knut Harald Spåre 1911–1917
- Kustaa Adolf Saarinen 1917–1918 (acting)
- Antti Tulenheimo 1918–1919
- Albert von Hellens 1919–1930
- Sigurd Mattsson 1930–1959
- Jorma Tuominen 1959–1972
- Valdemar Sandelin 1973–1979
- Risto Tainio 1979–1994
- Kaarina Suonio 1994–1997

=== Province of Mikkeli 1831–1997 ===
- Abraham Joakim Molander-Nordenheim 1831–1837
- Gabriel Anton Cronstedt 1837–1840
- Otto Abraham Boije 1840–1847
- Alexander Thesleff 1847–1853
- Carl Fabian Langenskiöld 1853–1854
- Carl Emil Cedercreutz 1854–1856
- Bernhard Indrenius 1856
- Samuel Werner von Troil 1856–1863
- Theodor Sebastian Gustaf Thilén 1863–1869
- Carl Gustav Mortimer von Kraemer 1869–1873
- Edvard Reinhold von Ammondt 1874–1875
- Hjalmar Sebastian Nordenstreng 1876–1883
- August Alexander Järnefelt 1883–1884
- Gustav Axel Samuel von Troil 1884–1889
- Johannes Gripenberg 1889–1891
- Knut Robert Carl Walfrid Spåre 1891–1899
- Lennart Fritiof Munck 1900–1903
- Aleksander Watatzi 1903–1905
- Anton Leonard von Knorring 1905–1910
- Eliel Ilmari Vuorinen 1910–1911
- Leo Aristides Sirelius 1911–1916
- Nikolai Sillman 1916–1917
- Aleksanteri August Aho 1917
- Ernst Edvard Rosenqvist 1918–1927
- Albin Pulkkinen 1927–1933
- Emil Jatkola 1933–1948
- Alpo Lumme 1949–1957
- Urho Kiukas 1957–1970
- Viljo Virtanen 1970–1979
- Uuno Voutilainen 1979–1989
- Juhani Kortesalmi 1989–1997

=== Province of Kuopio 1831–1997 ===
- Lars Sackleen 1831–1833
- Gustaf Adolf Ramsay 1833–1854
- Berndt Federley 1854–1855
- Sten Knut Johan Furuhjelm 1855–1862
- Samuel Henrik Antell 1862–1866
- Johan August von Essen 1866–1873
- Carl Gustaf Mortimer von Kraemer 1873–1884
- August Alexander Järnefelt 1884–1888
- Johan Fredrik Gustaf Aminoff 1888–1899
- Henrik Åkerman 1899–1900
- Edvard Gabriel Krogius 1900–1903
- Martin Alexius Bergh (Martti Vuori) 1903–1905
- Emil Wilhelm Stenius 1905–1911
- Werner Nikolaus Tavaststjerna 1911–1913
- Arthur Spåre 1913–1917
- Albert von Hellens 1917–1918
- Gustaf Ignatius 1918–1940
- Pekka Heikkinen 1940–1950
- Lauri Riikonen 1950–1960
- Erkki O. Mantere 1960–1966
- Risto Hölttä 1966–1978
- Kauko Hjerppe 1978–1993
- Olavi Martikainen 1993–1997

=== Province of Åland 1918–2009 ===
- Hjalmar von Bonsdorff 1918
- William Isaksson 1918–1922
- Lars Wilhelm Fagerlund 1922–1937
- Torsten Rothberg 1938
- Ruben Österberg 1939–1945
- Herman Koroleff 1945–1953
- Tor Brenning 1954–1972
- Martin Isaksson 1972–1982
- Henrik Gustavsson 1982–1999
- Peter Lindbäck 1999–2009

=== Province of Petsamo 1921–1921 ===
- Ilmari Helenius 1921

=== Province of Lapland 1938–2009 ===
- Kaarlo Hillilä 1938–1947
- Uuno Hannula 1947–1958
- Martti Miettunen 1958–1973
- Asko Oinas 1974–1994
- Hannele Pokka 1994–2008
- Timo E. Korva 2008–2009

=== Province of Kymi 1945–1997 ===
- Arvo Manner 1945–1955
- Artturi Ranta 1955–1964
- Esko Peltonen 1965–1975
- Erkki Huurtamo 1975–1984
- Matti Jaatinen 1984–1993
- Mauri Miettinen 1993–1997

=== Province of Central Finland 1960–1997 ===
- Eino Palovesi 1960–1972
- Artturi Jämsén 1972–1976
- Kauko Sipponen 1976–1985
- Kalevi Kivistö 1985–1997

=== Province of Northern Karelia 1960–1997 ===
- Lauri Riikonen 1960–1967
- Esa Timonen 1967–1992
- Hannu Tenhiälä 1992–1997

=== Province of Southern Finland 1997–2009 ===
- Tuula Linnainmaa 1997–2003
- Anneli Taina 2003–2009

=== Province of Western Finland 1997–2009 ===
- Heikki Koski 1997–2003
- Rauno Saari 2003–2009

=== Province of Eastern Finland 1997–2009 ===
- Pirjo Ala-Kapee 1997–2009

== Governors of Västernorrland County, Västerbotten County, Saint Petersburg Governorate and Vyborg Governorate ==
Governors of Västernorrland County and Västerbotten County ruled in 1634–1809 also northern part of Finnish Lapland and eastern part of Torne Valley. Governors of Saint Petersburg Governorate and Vyborg Governorate ruled Old Finland (predecessor of Province of Viipuri) in 1721–1812.

=== Västernorrland County 1634–1638 ===
- Stellan Otto von Mörner 1634–1638

=== Västerbotten County 1638–1809 ===
- Stellan Otto von Mörner 1638–1641
- Frans Crusebjörn 1641–1653
- Johan Graan 1653–1679
- Jakob Fleming 1679
- Hans Clerck 1680–1683
- Hans Abraham Kruuse af Verchou 1683–1688
- Reinhold Johan von Fersen 1688
- Gotthard Strijk 1688–1692
- Arvid Horn 1692
- Gustaf Douglas 1692–1705
- Otto Wilhelm Löwen 1705–1712
- Anders Erik Ramsay 1713–1717
- Fredrik Magnus Cronberg 1717–1719
- Otto Reinhold Strömfelt 1719
- Carl Paulin Lagerflycht 1719
- Jacob Grundel 1719–1733
- Gabriel Gabrielsson Gyllengrip 1733–1753
- Olof Leijonstedt 1755–1759
- Johan Funck 1759–1762
- Martin Ehrensvan 1762–1765
- Olof Malmerfelt 1765–1769
- Carl Efraim Carpelan 1769
- Magnus Adolf von Kothen 1769–1775
- Georg Gustaf Wrangel 1775–1781
- Carl Wilhelm Leijonstedt 1781–1782
- Fredrik von Stenhagen 1782–1789
- Johan Gustaf af Donner 1789–1795
- Pehr Adam Stromberg 1795–1809

=== Saint Petersburg Governorate 1721–1744 ===
- Fjodor Apraksin 1721–1723
- Pjotr Apraksin, 1724–1725
- Aleksandr Menshikov 1725–1727
- Jan Kazimierz Sapieha 1727–1728
- Burkhard Christoph von Münnich 1728–1734
- Vasili Saltykov 1734–1740
- Jakov Shahovskoi 1740
- Nikolai Golovin 1742
- Peter von Lacy 1743
- Vasili Repnin 1744
- Stepan Ignatiev 1744

=== Vyborg Governorate 1744–1812 ===
- Yury Nikitich Repnin 1744
- Afanasey Isakov 1745–1752 (acting)
- Johann Christoph von Keyser 1752–1754
- Afanasey Isakov 1754–1766
- Nikolaus Hendrik von Engelhardt 1766–1778
- Yevgeny Petrovich Kashkin 1779–1780
- Pyotr Alekseyevich Stupishin 1780–1782
- Wilhelm Heinrich von Engelhardt 1782–1785
- Alexander Magnus von Peutling 1785–1785
- Karl Johann von Günzel 1785–1793
- Fyodor Pavlovich Shcherbatov 1793–1797
- Karl Magnus von Rüdinger 1797–1799
- Pyotr Vasilyevich Zheltuhin 1799–1799
- Magnus Orraeus 1799–1804
- Nikolay Fyodorovich Emin 1804–1808
- Ivan Jakovlevich Bukharin 1808–1811
- Johan Winter 1811–1812

== See also ==
- Governor General of Finland
- Governor-General in the Swedish Realm
- County Governors of Sweden
