= Viborg and Nyslott County =

County of Sweden

Viborg and Nyslott County^{1} Viborgs och Nyslotts län Viipurin ja Savonlinnan lääni
- County of the Swedish Empire
- 1634–1721
- Capital: Vyborg
- History
  - Established: 1634
  - Great Northern War: 1700–21
  - Treaty of Nystad: 30 August 1721
Succeeded by
County of Kymmenegård and Nyslott; Saint Petersburg Governorate
- ^{1} Prior to 1658 it was known as the County of Karelia (Swedish: Karelens län, Finnish: Karjalan lääni).

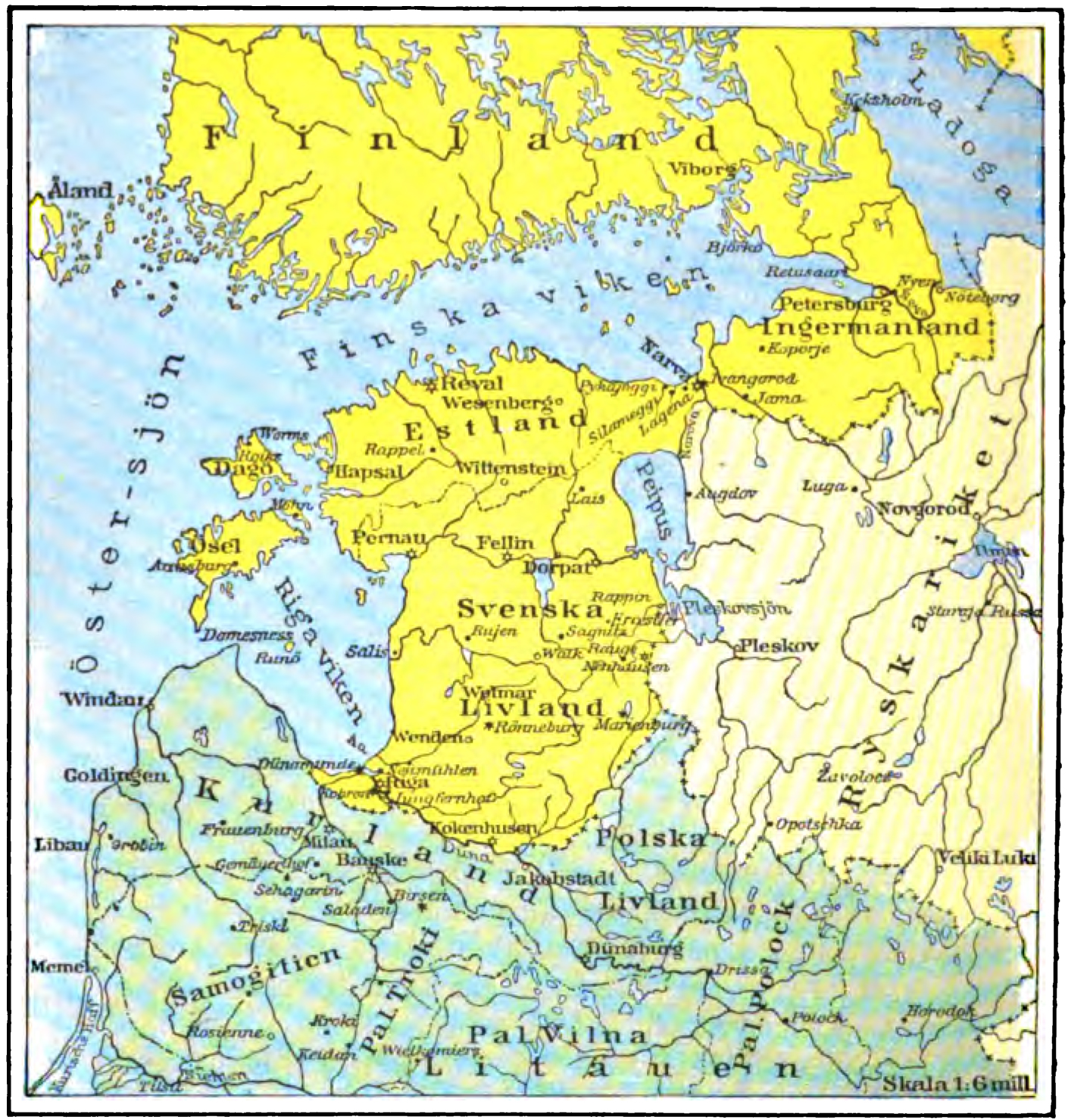
Provinces of the Swedish Empire around the Gulf of Finland in the 17th century

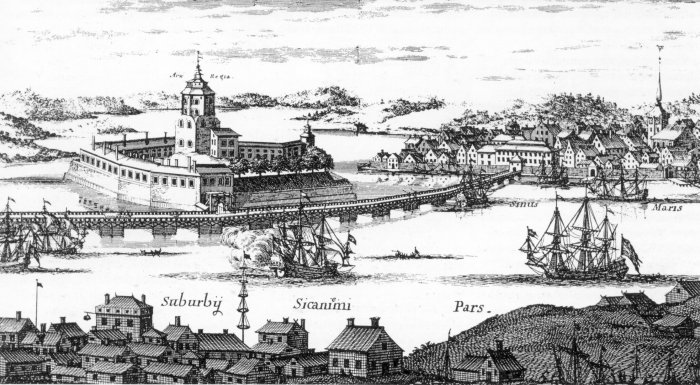
An engraving of Viborg Castle from Suecia antiqua et hodierna

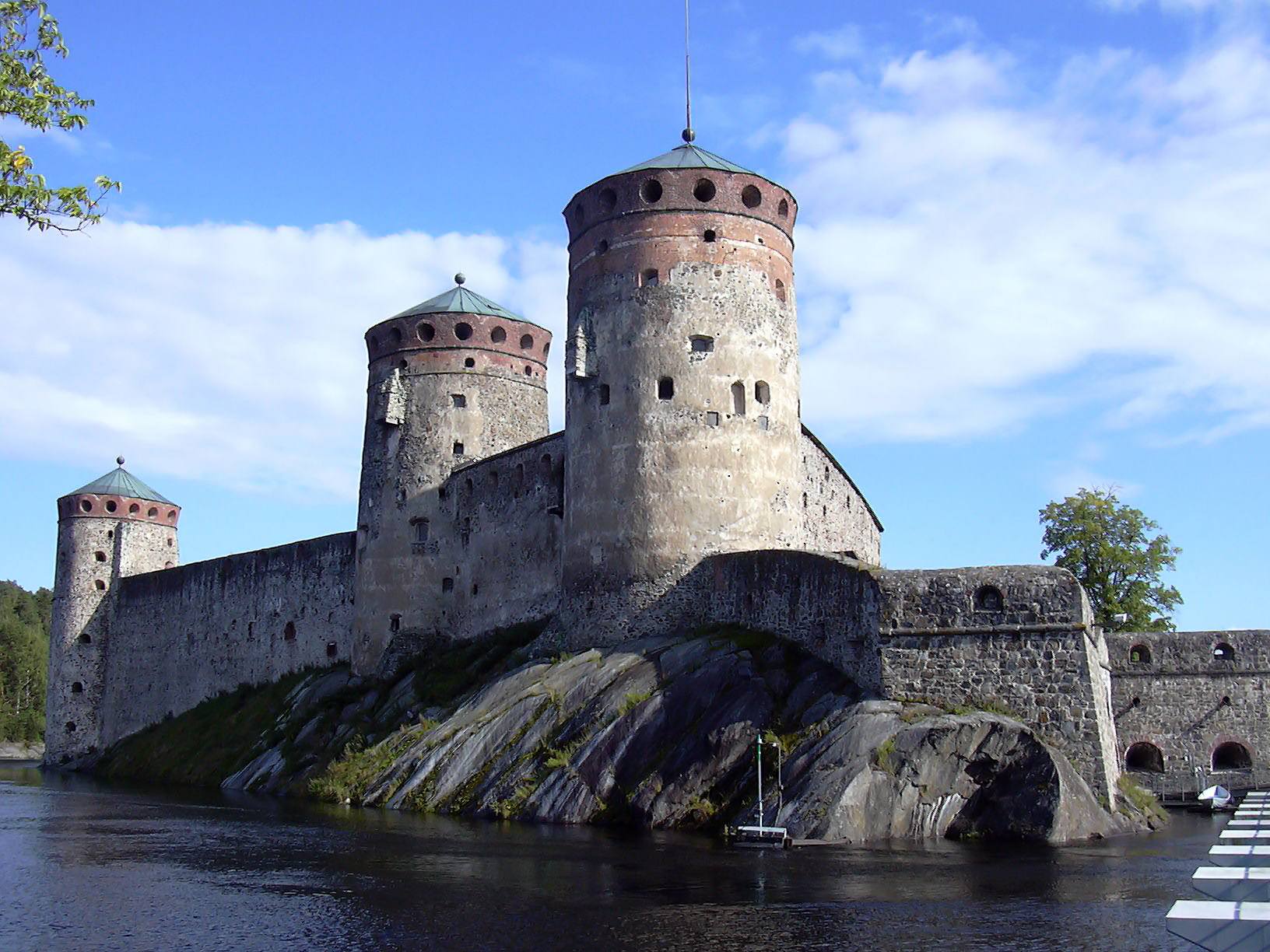
A photograph of St. Olaf's Castle at Nyslott

Viborg and Nyslott County (Swedish: Viborgs och Nyslotts län, Finnish: Viipurin ja Savonlinnan lääni) was a county of the Swedish Empire from 1634 to 1721. The county was named after the castle towns of Viborg (Finnish: Viipuri) and Nyslott (Finnish: Savonlinna, literally New Castle), today located in the towns of Vyborg in Russia and Savonlinna in Finland.

The county was established in 1634 as Karelia County (Swedish: Karelens län, Finnish: Karjalan lääni), but in 1641 Nyslott County (Swedish: Nyslotts län, Finnish: Savonlinnan lääni) was broken out and made a separate entity. Remainder of Karelia County was now called Viborg County. In 1650 the counties were joined again as the Viborg and Nyslott County.

Following the Great Northern War southeastern parts of the county were ceded to Russia in 1721, and the territory that remained was reconstituted into the County of Kymmenegård and Nyslott (Swedish: Kymmenegårds och Nyslotts län, Finnish: Savonlinnan ja Kymenkartanon lääni), with the northern and western parts of County of Kexholm. In 1743 following a new conflict part of this county was also ceded to Russia in the Treaty of Åbo. The ceded parts of the County of Viborg and Nyslott and the County of Kexholm were at first part of the Saint Petersburg Governorate, but in 1744 they were reconstituted with new conquests into the Russian Vyborg Governorate, which also became known as Old Finland. Remainder of the County of Kymmenegård and Nyslott was joined with some parts of the County of Nyland and Tavastehus in 1747 into the County of Savolax and Kymmenegård.

After the Russian victory in the Finnish War in 1809, Sweden ceded all its territory in Finland to Russia by the Treaty of Fredrikshamn. As part of Russian Empire Finland became to constitute a separate grand duchy. In 1812 Russia made the territories of Vyborg Governorate part of the new Grand Duchy of Finland as Viipuri Province.

== Maps ==
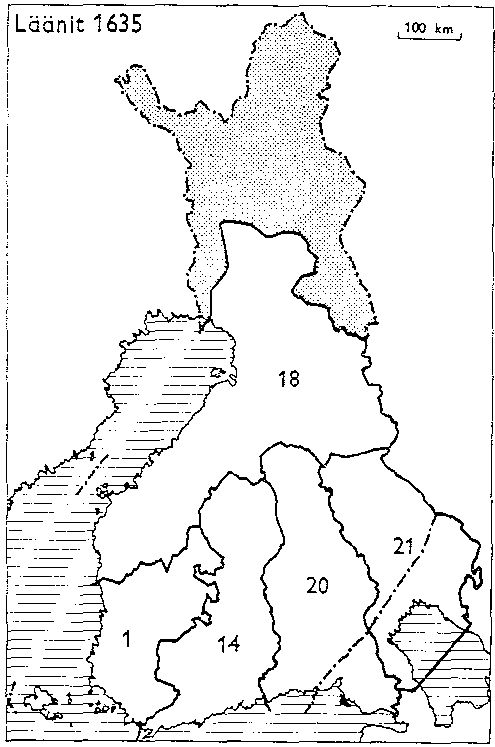
Provinces of Finland 1634: 1: Turku and Pori, 14: Nyland and Tavastehus, 18: Ostrobothnia, 20: Viborg and Nyslott, 21: Kexholm

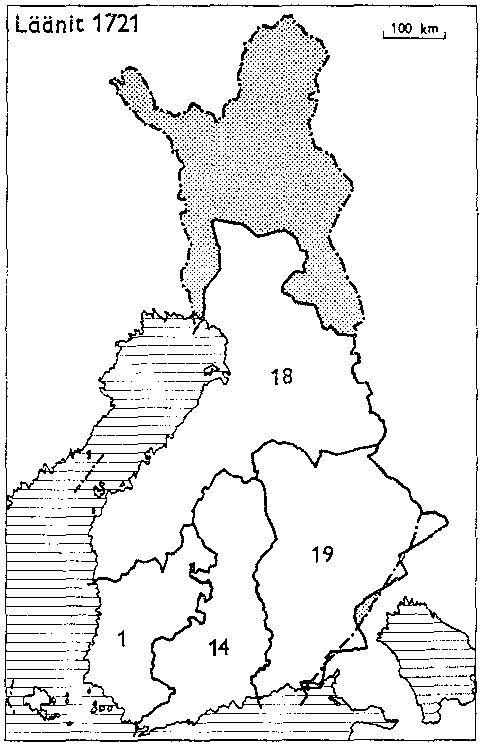
Provinces of Finland 1721: 1: Turku and Pori, 14: Nyland and Tavastehus, 18: Ostrobothnia, 19: Kymmenegård and Nyslott

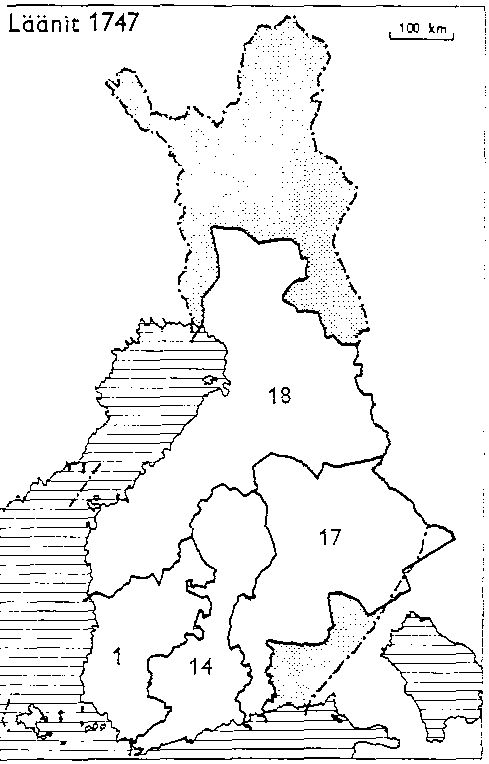
Provinces of Finland 1747: 1: Turku and Pori, 14: Nyland and Tavastehus, 17: Savolax and Kymmenegård, 18: Ostrobothnia

== Governors ==
- Åke Eriksson Oxenstierna 1634–1637
- Erik Gyllenstierna 1637–1641
- Karl Mörner 1641–1644 (Viborg County)
- Johan Rosenhane 1644–1650 (Viborg County)
- Herman Fleming 1641–1645 (Nyslott County)
- Mikael von Jordan 1645–1650 (Nyslott County)
- Johan Rosenhane 1650–1655
- Axel Axelsson Stålarm 1655–1656
- Anders Koskull 1656–1657
- Erik Kruse 1657–1658
- Jakob Törnsköld 1658–1667
- Conrad Gyllenstierna 1667–1674
- Fabian Wrede 1675–1681
- Carl Falkenberg 1681–1686
- Anders Lindhielm 1689–1704
- Georg Lybecker 1705–1712

== See also ==
- Fief of Viborg
- Vyborg Governorate
