= Kexholm County =

County of Sweden (1634–1721)

Kexholm County Kexholms län Käkisalmen lääni
- County of the Swedish Empire
- 1634–1721
- Coat of arms
- Capital: Kexholm
- History
  - Treaty of Nöteborg: 12 August 1323
  - Established: 1634
  - Great Northern War: 1700–21
  - Treaty of Nystad: 30 August 1721
Succeeded by
County of Kymmenegård and Nyslott; Saint Petersburg Governorate

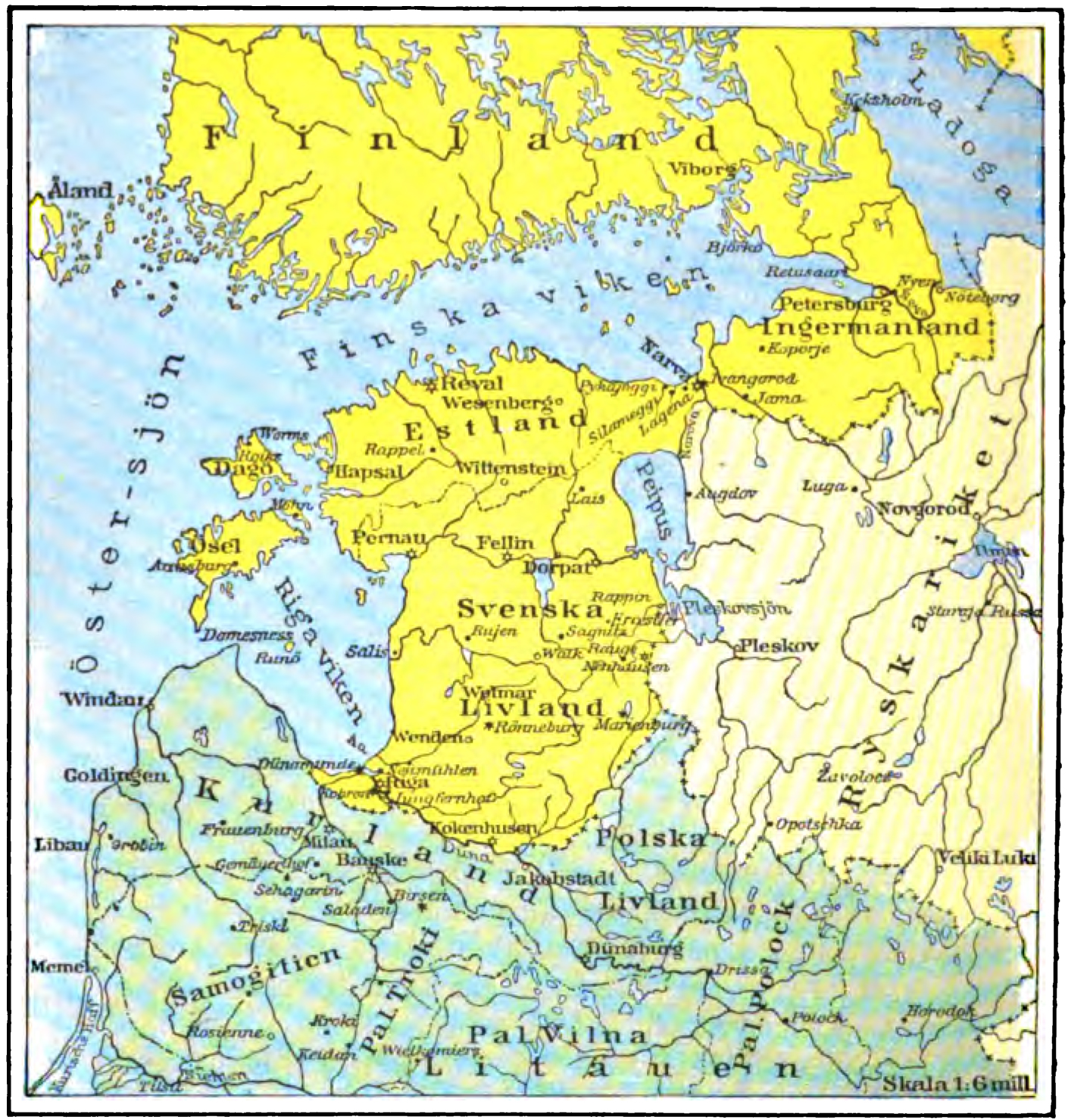
Provinces of the Swedish Empire around the Gulf of Finland in the 17th century.

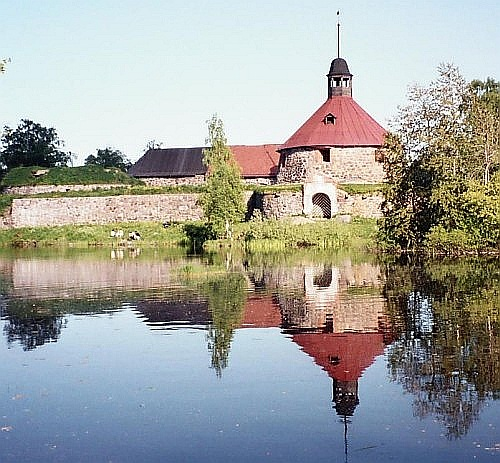
A photograph of the Castle of Kexholm at Priozersk.

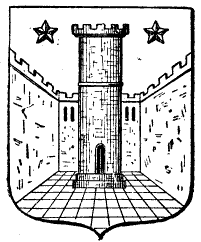
Coat of arms of the County of Kexholm.

Kexholm County, or Käkisalmi Province, (Note: Swedish: Kexholms län, Finnish: Käkisalmen lääni. In Finnish contexts, lääni or län is usually translated as 'province', while in Swedish contexts, län is usually translated as 'county'.) was a county of the Swedish Empire from 1634 to 1721, when the southern part was ceded to the Russian Empire in the Treaty of Nystad. The capital of the county was Kexholm (Finnish: Käkisalmi), which today is Priozersk.

== History ==
The county was ceded to Sweden by Russia together with Ingria by the Treaty of Stolbovo in 1617. The county extended to the parishes of Lieksa in the north and of Suojärvi in the east. In the south and west, the county was bordered by Viborg and Nyslott County.

Following the Great Northern War, southern and eastern parts were ceded to Russia in 1721, and the territory that remained was reconstituted into the County of Kymmenegård and Nyslott (Swedish: Kymmenegårds och Nyslotts län, Finnish: Savonlinnan ja Kymenkartanon lääni), with the remainder of the Viborg and Nyslott County. In 1743 following a new conflict part of this county was also ceded to Russia in the Treaty of Åbo. The ceded parts of the County of Viborg and Nyslott and the County of Kexholm were at first part of the Saint Petersburg Governorate, but in 1744 they were reconstituted with new conquests into the Russian Vyborg Governorate, which also became known as Old Finland. Remainder of the County of Kymmenegård and Nyslott was joined with some parts of the County of Nyland and Tavastehus in 1747 into the County of Savolax and Kymmenegård.

After the Russian victory in the Finnish War of 1809, Sweden ceded all its territory in Finland to Russia by the Treaty of Fredrikshamn. As part of the Russian Empire Finland came to constitute a separate grand duchy. In 1812 Russia made the territories of the Vyborg Governorate part of the new Grand Duchy of Finland as Viipuri Province.

== Maps ==
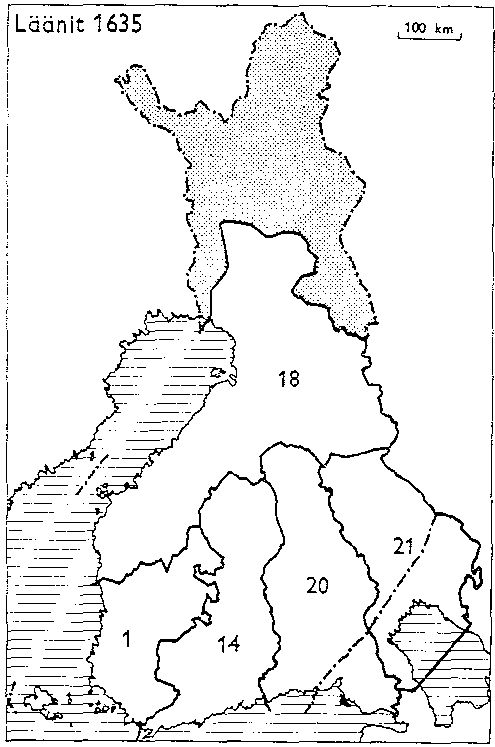
Provinces of Finland 1634: 1: Turku and Pori, 14: Nyland and Tavastehus, 18: Ostrobothnia, 20: Viborg and Nyslott, 21: Kexholm

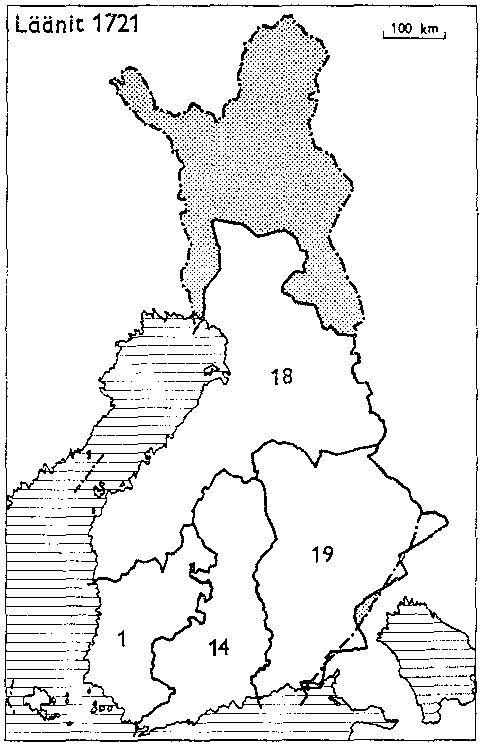
Provinces of Finland 1721: 1: Turku and Pori, 14: Nyland and Tavastehus, 18: Ostrobothnia, 19: Kymmenegård and Nyslott

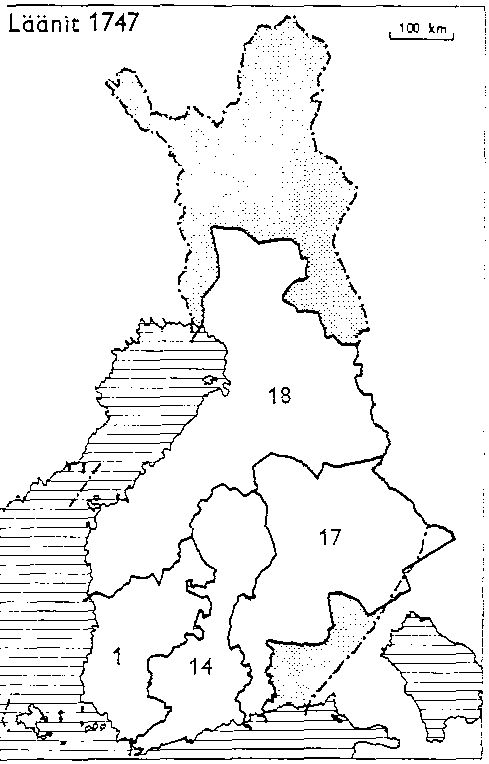
Provinces of Finland 1747: 1: Turku and Pori, 14: Nyland and Tavastehus, 17: Savolax and Kymmenegård, 18: Ostrobothnia

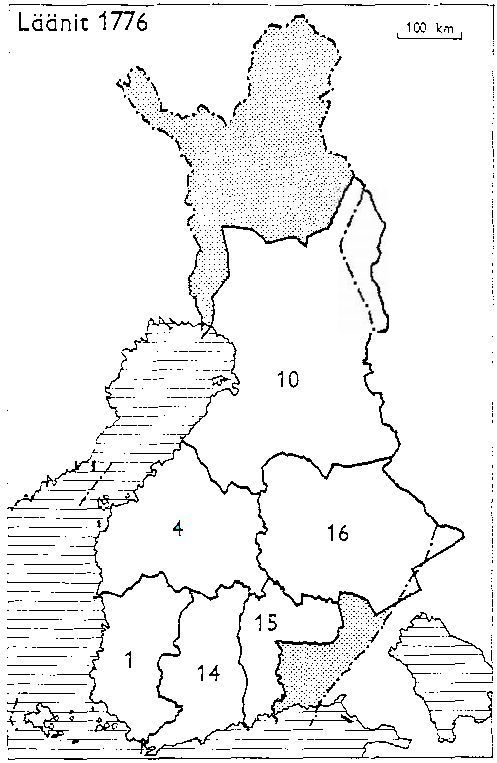
Provinces of Finland 1776: 1: Turku and Pori, 4: Vaasa, 10: Oulu, 14: Nyland and Tavastehus, 15: Kymmenegård, 16: Savolax and Karelia

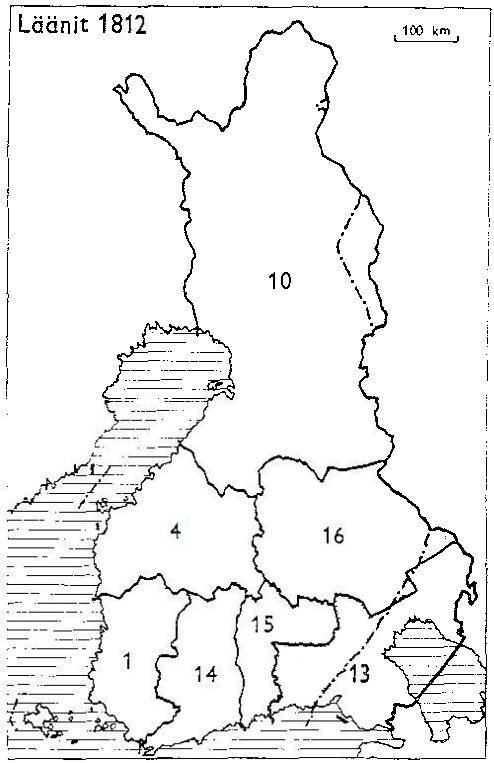
Provinces of Finland 1812:1: Turku and Pori, 4: Vaasa, 10: Oulu, 13: Viipuri, 14: Nyland and Tavastehus, 15: Kymmenegård, 16: Savolax and Karelia

== Governors ==
- Henrik Månsson 1634–1636
- Magnus Nieroth 1636–1641
- Henrik Piper 1641–1642 (acting)
- Reinhold Mettstake 1642–1652
- Jakob Törnsköld 1652–1656
- Karl von Scheiding 1657–1660
- Patrick Ogilwie 1660–1674
- Berendt Mellin 1674–1690

== See also ==
- Vyborg Governorate
- Karelia
