= Kymmenegård County =

Kymmenegård County Kymmenegårds län Kymenkartanon lääni
- County of Sweden 1775–1809; Province of Grand Duchy of Finland 1809–1831
- 1775–1831
- Capital: Heinola
- History
  - Established: 1775
  - Disestablished: 1831
Preceded by	Succeeded by
Savolax and Kymmenegård County	Mikkeli Province; Uusimaa Province

Kymmenegård County, or Kymenkartano Province, (Note: Swedish: Kymmenegårds län, Finnish: Kymenkartanon lääni. In Finnish contexts, lääni or län is usually translated as 'province', while in Swedish contexts, län is usually translated as 'county'.) was a county of Sweden from 1775 to 1809, and a county of Grand Duchy of Finland from 1809 to 1831.

The county was created in 1775 by dividing the Savolax and Kymmenegård County (Swedish: Savolax och Kymmenegårds län, Finnish: Savonlinnan ja Kymenkartanon lääni) into two parts: Savolax and Karelia County and Kymmenegård County. Residence city was Heinola.

By the Treaty of Fredrikshamn in 1809 Sweden ceded all its territories in Finland, east of the Torne River, to Russia. Kymmenegård Province was succeeded in 1831 by the Mikkeli Province in the autonomous Grand Duchy of Finland. Minor parts of province were merged to Uusimaa Province.

== Maps ==
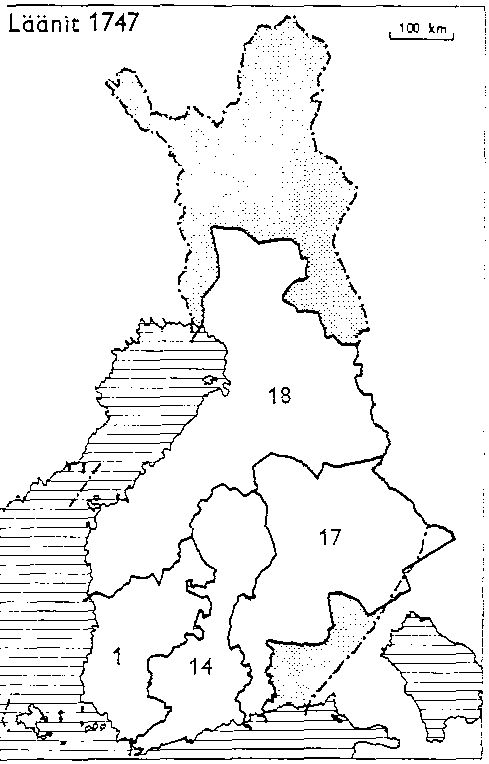
Provinces of Finland 1747: 1: Turku and Pori, 14: Nyland and Tavastehus, 17: Savolax and Kymmenegård, 18: Ostrobothnia

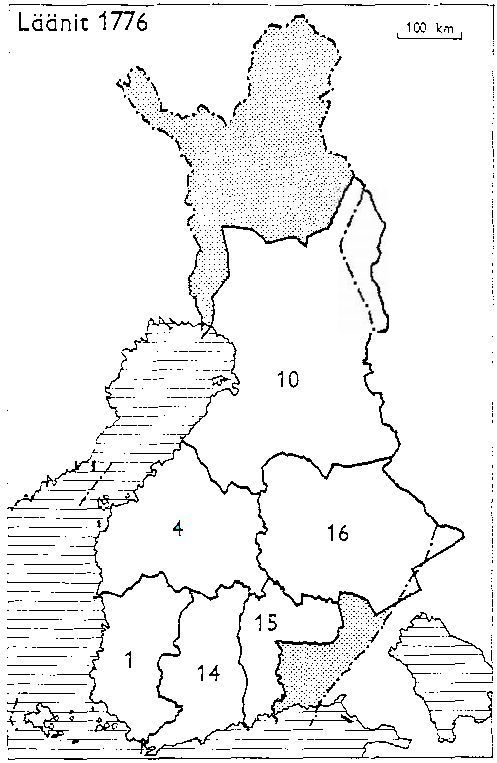
Provinces of Finland 1776: 1: Turku and Pori, 4: Vaasa, 10: Oulu, 14: Nyland and Tavastehus, 15: Kymmenegård, 16: Savolax and Karelia

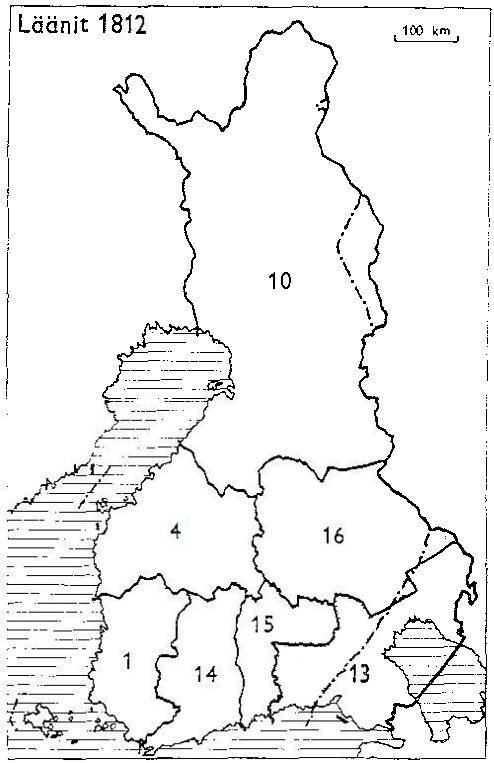
Provinces of Finland 1812: 1: Turku and Pori, 4: Vaasa, 10: Oulu, 13: Viipuri, 14: Nyland and Tavastehus, 15: Kymmenegård, 16: Savolax and Karelia

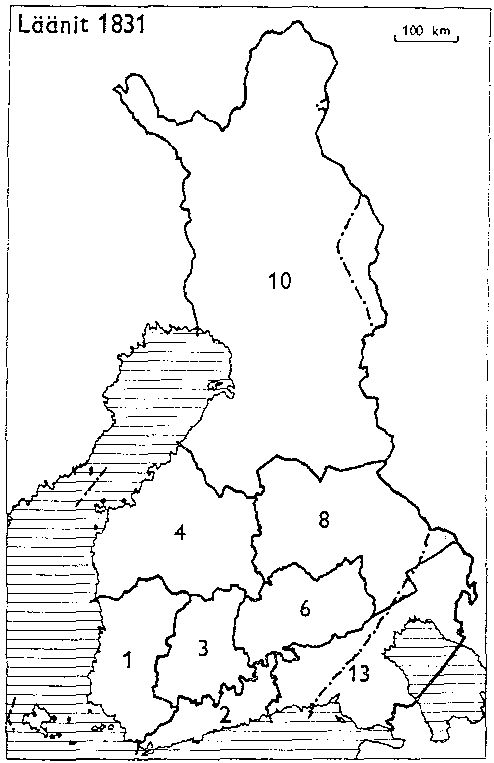
Provinces of Finland 1831: 1: Turku and Pori, 2: Uusimaa, 3: Häme, 4: Vaasa, 6: Mikkeli, 8: Kuopio, 10: Oulu, 13: Viipuri

== Governors ==
- Gustaf Riddercreutz 1774–1783
- Robert Wilhelm de Geer af Tervik 1783–1789
- Otto Wilhelm Ramsay 1789–1792
- Herman af Låstbom 1793
- Otto Wilhelm Ramsay 1793
- Johan Herman Lode 1793–1810
- Fredrik Adolf Jägerhorn af Spurila 1810–1812
- Anders Gustaf Langenskiöld 1812–1827
- Adolf Broberg 1827–1828
- Erik Wallenius 1828
- Abraham Joakim Molander 1828–1831
