= Brofeldt =

Brofeldt is a surname. Notable people with the surname include:

- Arthur Brofeldt (1868–1928), Finnish politician
- Helga Brofeldt (1881–1968), Swedish film actress
- Juhani Aho (born Johannes Brofeldt, 1861–1921), Finnish author and journalist
