= Kymmenegård and Nyslott County =

Swedish political subdivision

Kymmenegård and Nyslott County Kymmenegårds och Nyslotts län Savonlinnan ja Kymenkartanon lääni
- County of Sweden
- 1721–1747
- Capital: Villmanstrand^{1}
- History
  - Established: 1721
  - Disestablished: 1747
| Preceded by | Succeeded by |
| Viborg and Nyslott County; Kexholm County | Savolax and Kymmenegård County; Vyborg Governorate |
- ^{1} Finnish: Lappeenranta

Kymmenegård and Nyslott County (Swedish: Kymmenegårds och Nyslotts län, Finnish: Savonlinnan ja Kymenkartanon lääni) was a county of Sweden from 1721 to 1747.

In 1721, following the Great Northern War, the southern parts of the counties of Viborg and Nyslott and Kexholm were ceded by the Treaty of Nystad to the Russian Empire. The remaining territories were joined into the new County of Kymmenegård and Nyslott. In 1743 following a new conflict southern part of the new county, including the residence city of Villmanstrand, was ceded to Russia in the Treaty of Åbo. Remaining part of the county was merged with some territories from County of Nyland and Tavastehus in 1747 to a new County of Savolax and Kymmenegård.

== Maps ==
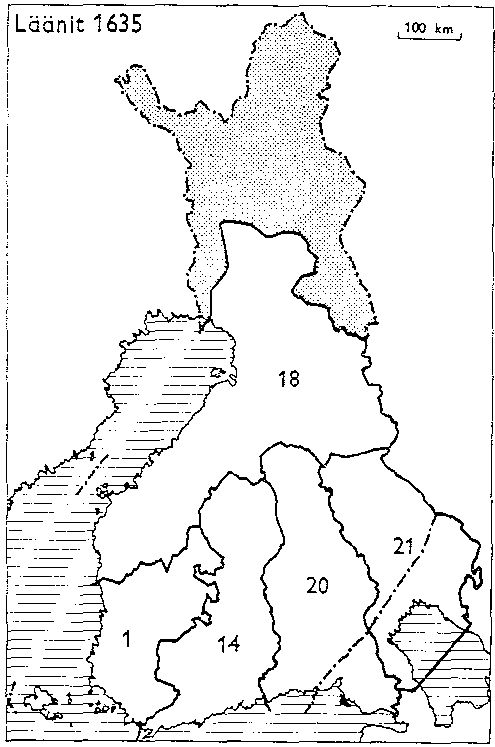
Provinces of Finland 1634: 1: Turku and Pori, 14: Nyland and Tavastehus, 18: Ostrobothnia, 20: Viborg and Nyslott, 21: Kexholm

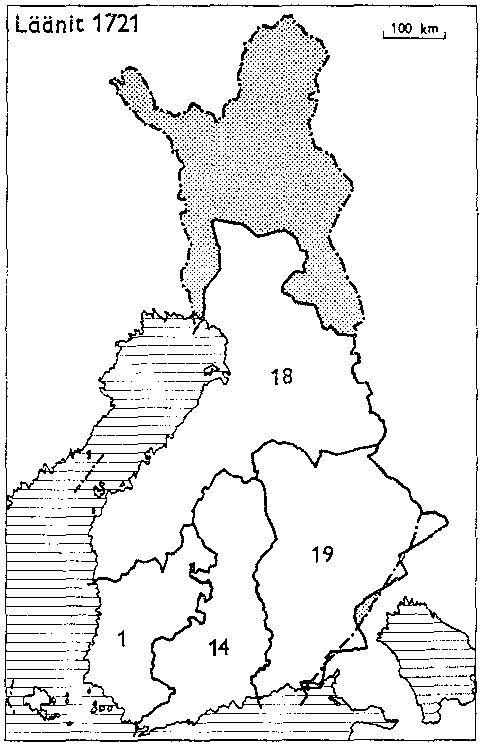
Provinces of Finland 1721: 1: Turku and Pori, 14: Nyland and Tavastehus, 18: Ostrobothnia, 19: Kymmenegård and Nyslott

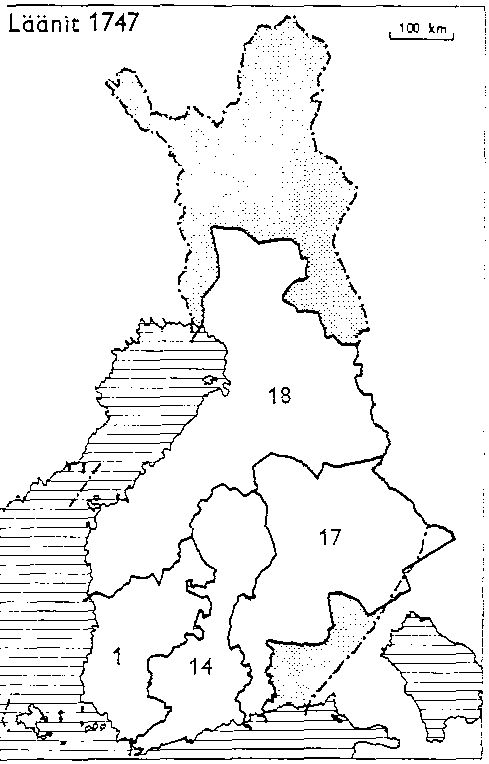
Provinces of Finland 1747: 1: Turku and Pori, 14: Nyland and Tavastehus, 17: Savolax and Kymmenegård, 18: Ostrobothnia

== Governors ==
- Johan Henrik Friesenheim 1721–1737
- Joachim von Dittmer 1738–1741
- Carl Johan Stiernstedt 1741–1746
