= Savolax and Karelia County =

Former country of Sweden

Savolax and Karelia County Savolax och Karelia län Savon ja Karjalan lääni
- County of Sweden 1775–1809; Province of Grand Duchy of Finland 1809–1831
- 1775–1831
- Capital: Kuopio
- History
  - Established: 1775
  - Disestablished: 1831
Preceded by	Succeeded by
Savolax and Kymmenegård County	Kuopio Province; Mikkeli Province

Savolax and Karelia County (Swedish: Savolax och Karelens län, Finnish: Savonlinnan ja Karjalan lääni or Savo-Karjalan lääni) was a county of Sweden 1775–1809 and province of Grand Duchy of Finland 1809–1831. It was formed in 1775 when Savolax and Kymmenegård County was divided into Savolax and Karelia County and Kymmenegård County. Residence city was Kuopio.

By the Treaty of Fredrikshamn in 1809 Sweden ceded all its territories in Finland, east of the Torne River, to Russia. Savolax and Karelia Province was succeeded in 1831 by the Kuopio Province in the autonomous Grand Duchy of Finland. Minor parts of province were merged to Mikkeli Province.

== Maps ==
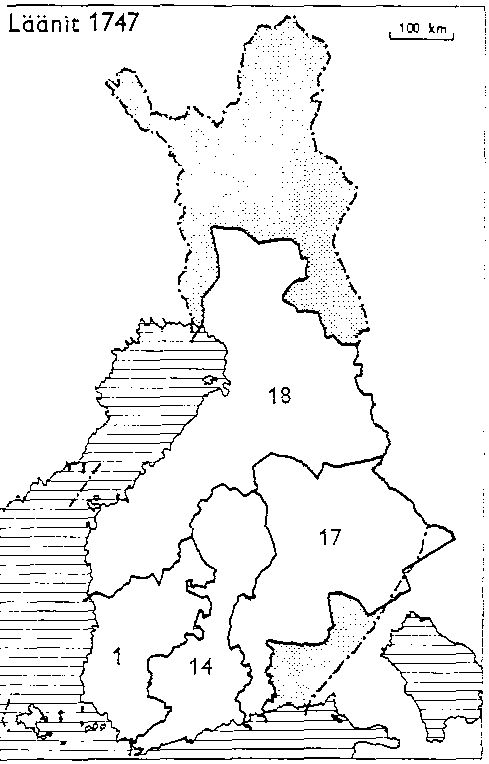
Provinces of Finland 1747: 1: Turku and Pori, 14: Nyland and Tavastehus, 17: Savolax and Kymmenegård, 18: Ostrobothnia

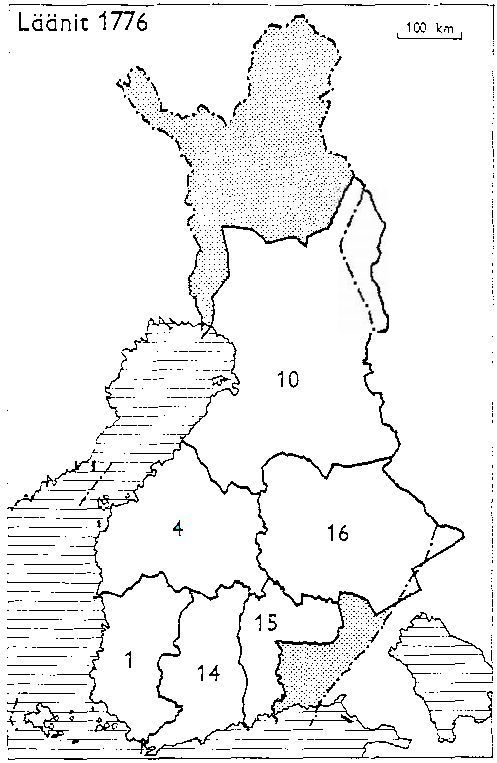
Provinces of Finland 1776: 1: Turku and Pori, 4: Vaasa, 10: Oulu, 14: Nyland and Tavastehus, 15: Kymmenegård, 16: Savolax and Karelia

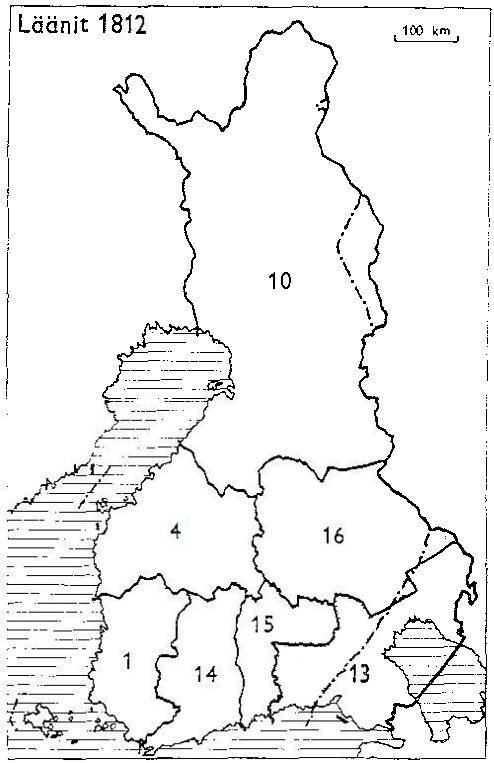
Provinces of Finland 1812:1: Turku and Pori, 4: Vaasa, 10: Oulu, 13: Viipuri, 14: Nyland and Tavastehus, 15: Kymmenegård, 16: Savolax and Karelia

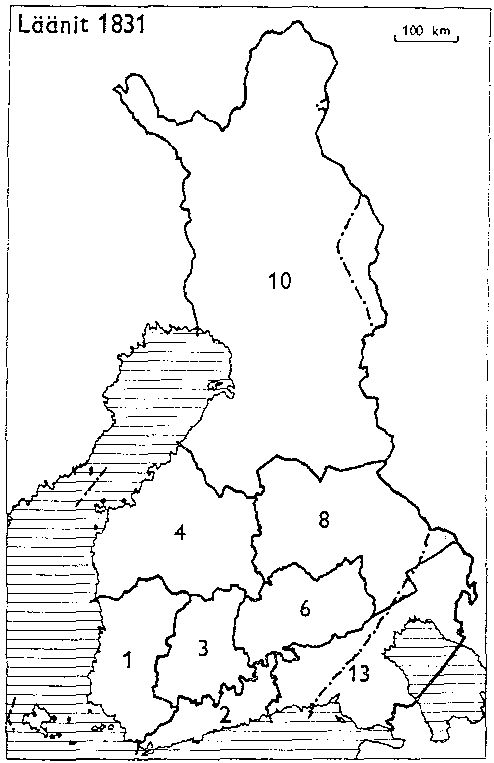
Provinces of Finland 1831: 1: Turku and Pori, 2: Uusimaa, 3: Häme, 4: Vaasa, 6: Mikkeli, 8: Kuopio, 10: Oulu, 13: Viipuri

== Governors ==
- Otto Ernst Boije 1775–1781
- Georg Henrik von Wright 1781–1786
- Simon Vilhelm Carpelan 1786–1791
- Anders Johan Ramsay 1791–1803
- Eric Johan von Fieandt 1803
- Olof Wibelius 1803–1809
- Simon Vilhelm Carpelan 1809–1810
- Gustaf Aminoff 1810–1827
- Carl Klick 1828–1829
- Lars Sacklen 1829–1831
