= Uusimaa Province =

Former province of Finland

Coordinates: 60.1733°N 24.9486°E

Uusimaa Province Uudenmaan lääni Nylands län Нюландская губерния
- Province of Finland
- 1831–1997
- Coat of arms

- Capital: Helsinki
- Area
  - 1 January 1993: 10,404 km^{2} (4,017 sq mi)
- Population
  - 1 January 1993: 1,277,932
- History
  - Established: 1831
  - Disestablished: 1997
Preceded by	Succeeded by
County of Nyland and Tavastehus	Southern Finland

Uusimaa Province (Finnish: Uudenmaan lääni, Swedish: Nylands län, Russian: Нюландская губерния) was a province of Finland from 1831 to 1997.

It was established in 1831, when the County of Nyland and Tavastehus was divided into the Häme Province and Uusimaa Province.

In 1997 it was merged with the Kymi Province and the southern parts of the Häme Province into the new Southern Finland Province.

== History ==
The beginnings of the province of Uusimaa lie in the Swedish governance reforms of 1634. At that time, new counties were established also in the territories of Finland.

The five counties established in Finland were the counties of Uusimaa and Häme, the counties of Turku and Pori, the counties of Viipuri and Savonlinna, the province of Ostrobothnia and the county of Käkisalmi.

== Maps ==
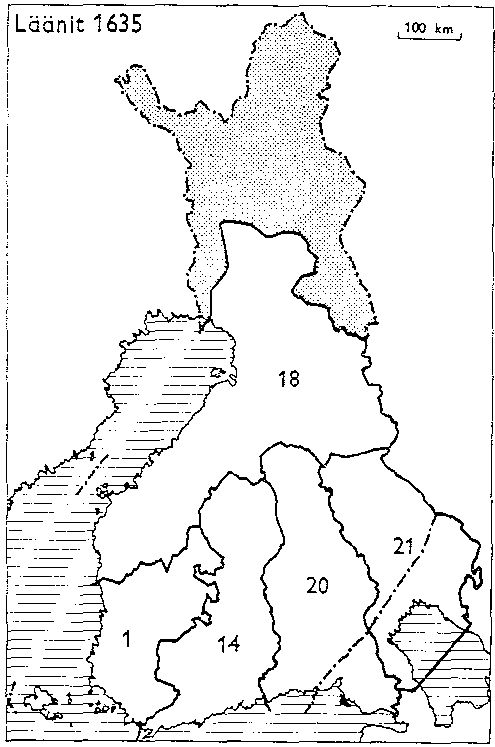
Provinces of Finland 1634: 1: Turku and Pori, 14: Nyland and Tavastehus, 18: Ostrobothnia, 20: Viborg and Nyslott, 21: Kexholm

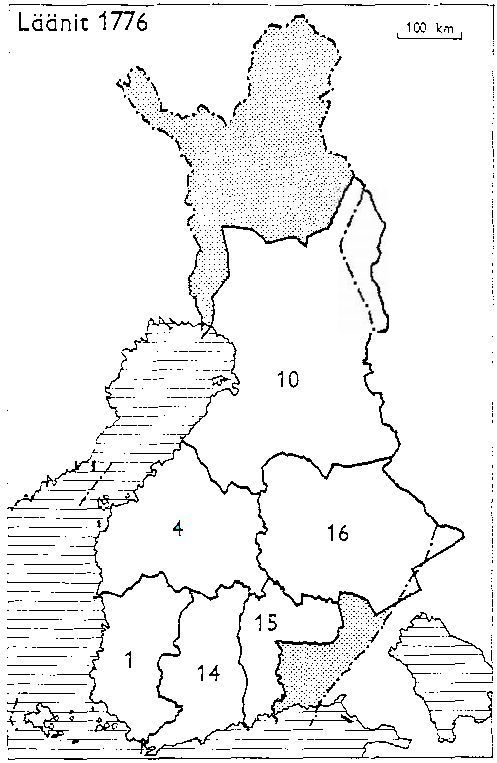
Provinces of Finland 1776: 1: Turku and Pori, 4: Vaasa, 10: Oulu, 14: Nyland and Tavastehus, 15: Kymmenegård, 16: Savolax and Karelia

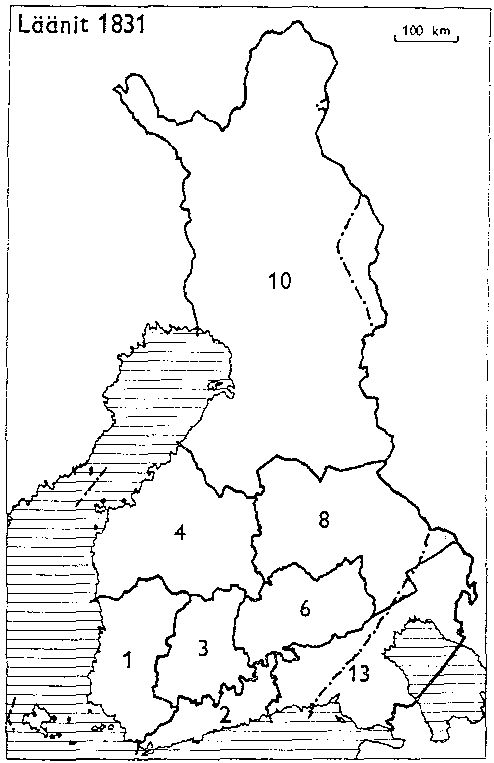
Provinces of Finland 1831: 1: Turku and Pori, 2: Uusimaa, 3: Häme, 4: Vaasa, 6: Mikkeli, 8: Kuopio, 10: Oulu, 13: Viipuri

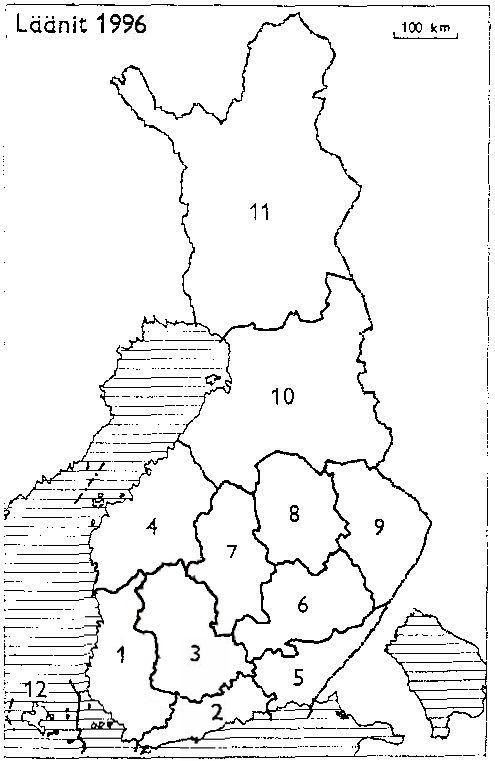
Provinces of Finland 1996: 1: Turku and Pori, 2: Uusimaa, 3: Häme, 4: Vaasa, 5: Kymi, 6: Mikkeli, 7: Central Finland, 8: Kuopio, 9: Northern Karelia, 10: Oulu, 11: Lapland, 12: Åland

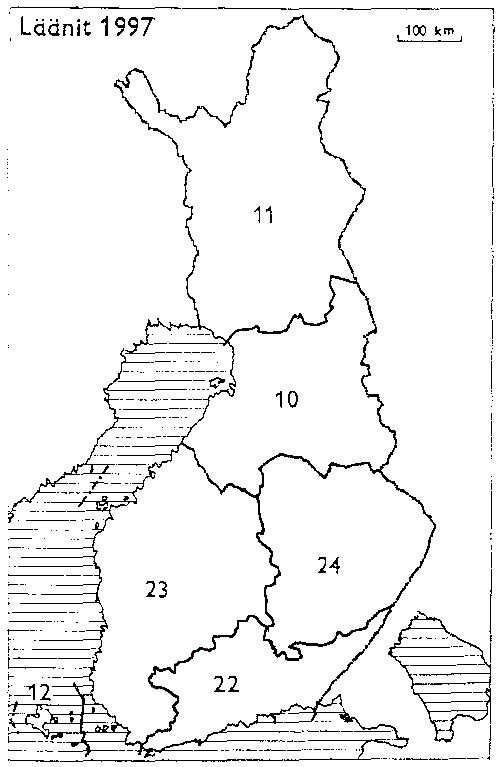
Provinces of Finland 1997: 10: Oulu, 11: Lapland, 12: Åland, 22: Southern Finland, 23: Western Finland, 24: Eastern Finland

== Municipalities in 1997 (cities in bold) ==
- Artjärvi
- Askola
- **Ekenäs**
- **Espoo**
- **Hanko**
- **Helsinki**
- **Hyvinkää**
- Ingå
- **Järvenpää**
- **Karis**
- Karjalohja
- **Karkkila**
- **Kauniainen**
- **Kerava**
- Kirkkonummi
- Lapinjärvi
- Liljendal
- **Lohja**
- **Loviisa**
- Myrskylä
- Mäntsälä
- Nummi-Pusula
- Nurmijärvi
- **Orimattila**
- Pernå
- Pohja
- Pornainen
- **Porvoo**
- Pukkila
- Ruotsinpyhtää
- Sammatti
- Sipoo
- Siuntio
- Tuusula
- **Vantaa**
- Vihti

== Former municipalities (disestablished before 1997) ==
- Degerby
- Haaga
- Huopalahti
- Hyvinkään mlk
- Karis lk
- Kulosaari
- Oulunkylä
- Lohjan kunta
- Nummi
- Pusula
- Pyhäjärvi Ul
- Tenala

== Governors ==
- Johan Ulrik Sebastian Gripenberg 1831
- Gustaf Magnus Armfelt 1832–1847
- Johan Mauritz Nordenstam 1847–1858
- Samuel Henrik Antell 1858–1862
- Vladimir Alfons Walleen 1862–1869
- Theodor Thilén 1869–1873
- Georg von Alfthan 1873–1888
- Victor Napoleon Procopé 1888
- Hjalmar Georg Palin 1888–1897
- Kasten de Pont 1897–1900
- Mikhail Nikiforovitsh Kaigorodoff 1901–1905
- Anatol Anatolievitsch Rheinbott 1905
- Alexander Lvovsky 1905–1906
- Max Theodor Alfthan 1906–1910
- Eugraf Nyman 1910–1917
- Bernhard Otto Widnäs 1913–1917
- Bruno Jalander 1917–1932
- Ilmari Helenius 1932–1944
- Armas-Eino Martola 1944–1946
- Väinö Meltti 1946–1964
- Reino Lehto 1964–1966
- Kaarlo Pitsinki 1966–1982
- Jacob Söderman 1982–1989
- Eva-Riitta Siitonen 1990–1996
- Pekka Silventoinen 1996–1997
