= Southern Finland Province =

Coordinates: 60°30′N 26°00′E

Southern Finland Province Etelä-Suomen lääni Södra Finlands län
- Coat of arms

- Country: Finland
- Established: 1 September 1997
- Abolished: 1 January 2010
- Capital: Hämeenlinna
- Largest city: Helsinki

Government
  - Governor: Anneli Taina

Area
  - Total: 34,378 km^{2} (13,273 sq mi)

Population (31 December 2009)
  - Total: 2,209,677
  - Density: 64.276/km^{2} (166.47/sq mi)
- Time zone: UTC+2 (EET)
  - Summer (DST): UTC+3 (EEST)
- ISO 3166 code: ES
- NUTS code: 18

Southern Finland (Finnish: Etelä-Suomen lääni, Swedish: Södra Finlands län) was a province of Finland from 1997 to 2009. It bordered the provinces of Western Finland and Eastern Finland. It also bordered the Gulf of Finland and Russia.

== History ==
On 1 September 1997 the Uusimaa Province, the Kymi Province and the southern parts of the Häme Province were joined to form the new Southern Finland Province.

All the provinces of Finland were abolished on 1 January 2010.

== Administration ==
The State Provincial Office was a joint regional authority of seven different ministries. It promoted national and regional objectives of the State central administration. The State Provincial Office of Southern Finland employed about 380 persons. Its service offices were located in the cities of Hämeenlinna, Helsinki, and Kouvola. The administrative seat was placed at Hämeenlinna.

== Regions ==
Southern Finland was divided into six regions:

- South Karelia (Etelä-Karjala / Södra Karelen)
- Päijät-Häme (Päijät-Häme / Päijänne Tavastland)
- Kanta-Häme (Kanta-Häme / Egentliga Tavastland)
- Uusimaa (Uusimaa / Nyland)
- Eastern Uusimaa (Itä-Uusimaa / Östra Nyland)
- Kymenlaakso (Kymenlaakso / Kymmenedalen)

== Municipalities in 2009 (cities in bold) ==
Southern Finland was divided into 72 municipalities in 2009.

- Artjärvi
- Asikkala
- Askola
- **Espoo**
- **Forssa**
- **Hamina**
- **Hanko**
- Hartola
- Hattula
- Hausjärvi
- **Heinola**
- **Helsinki**
- Hollola
- Humppila
- **Hyvinkää**
- Hämeenkoski
- **Hämeenlinna**
- Iitti
- **Imatra**
- Ingå
- Janakkala
- Jokioinen
- **Järvenpää**
- Karjalohja
- **Karkkila**
- **Kauniainen**
- **Kerava**
- Kirkkonummi
- **Kotka**
- **Kouvola**
- Kärkölä
- **Lahti**
- Lapinjärvi
- **Lappeenranta**
- Lemi
- Liljendal
- **Lohja**
- Loppi
- **Loviisa**
- Luumäki
- Miehikkälä
- Myrskylä
- Mäntsälä
- Nastola
- Nummi-Pusula
- Nurmijärvi
- **Orimattila**
- Padasjoki
- Parikkala
- Pernå
- Pornainen
- **Porvoo**
- Pukkila
- Pyhtää
- **Raseborg**
- Rautjärvi
- **Riihimäki**
- Ruokolahti
- Ruotsinpyhtää
- Savitaipale
- Sipoo
- Siuntio
- Suomenniemi
- Sysmä
- Taipalsaari
- Tammela
- Tuusula
- **Vantaa**
- Vihti
- Virolahti
- Ylämaa
- Ypäjä

== Former municipalities (disestablished before 2009) ==
- Anjalankoski
- Ekenäs
- Elimäki
- Hauho
- Jaala
- Joutseno
- Kalvola
- Karis
- Kuusankoski
- Lammi
- Pohja
- Renko
- Saari
- Sammatti
- Tuulos
- Uukuniemi
- Valkeala
- Vehkalahti

== Governors ==
- Tuula Linnainmaa 1997-2003
- Anneli Taina 2003-2009

== Heraldry ==
The coat of arms of Southern Finland was composed of the arms of Häme (Tavastia), Karelia and Uusimaa.
