= Vyborg Governorate =

1744–1812 unit of Russia

Coordinates: 60.7092°N 28.7442°E

Vyborg Governorate Выборгская губерния
- Governorate of the Russian Empire
- 1744–1812
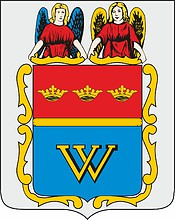
- Coat of arms

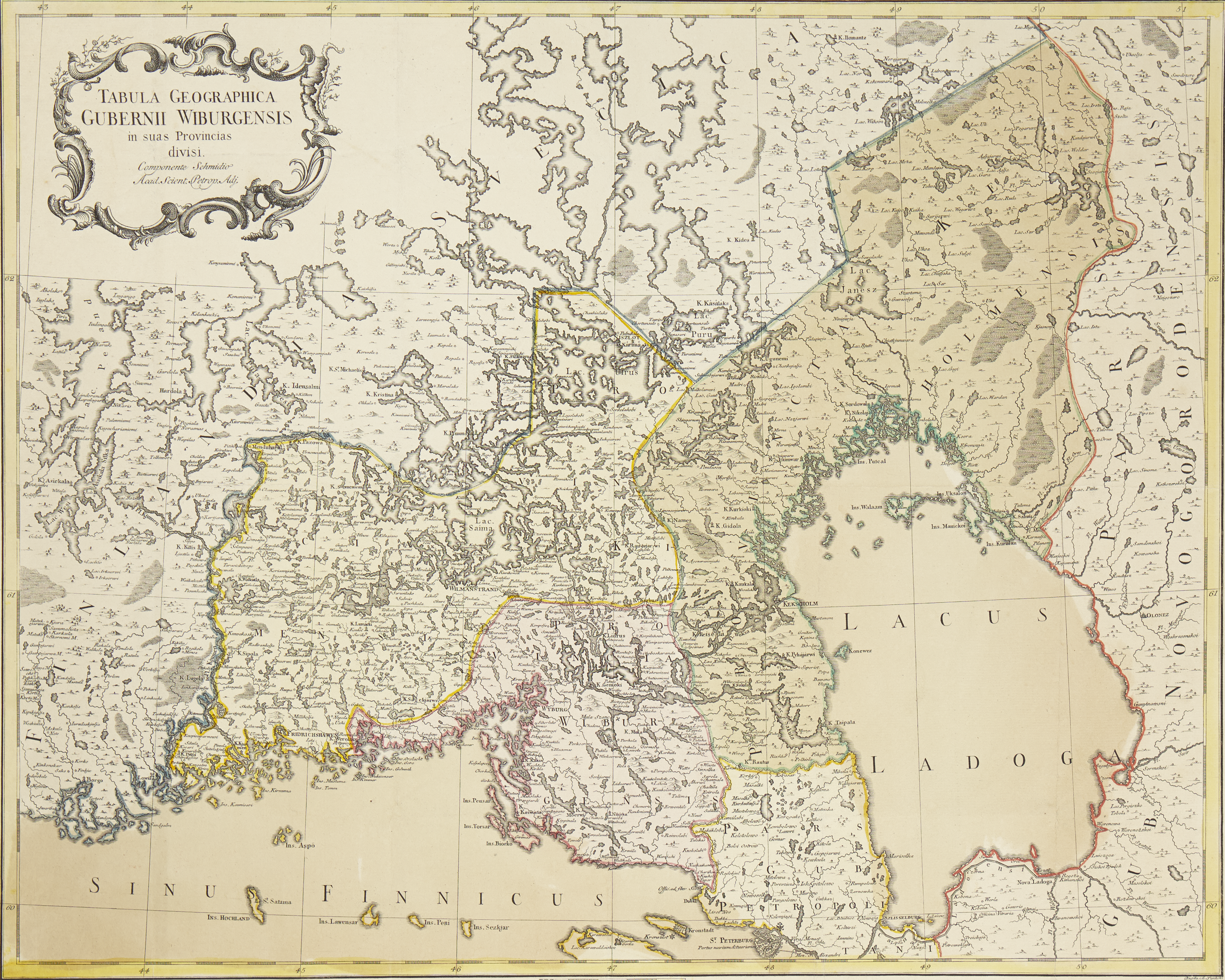
- History
  - Established: 1744
  - Disestablished: 1812
Preceded by	Succeeded by
Saint Petersburg Governorate	Viipuri Province
- Today part of: Finland; Russia

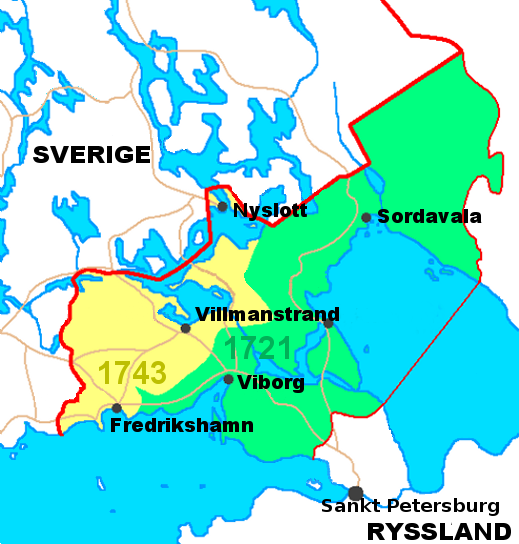
Map of the secession of former Swedish Empire territory to the Russian Empire in 1721 and 1743 within the Vyborg Governorate.

Vyborg Governorate (Note: Russian: Выборгская губерния, romanized: Vyborgskaya guberniya; Finnish: Viipurin kuvernementti) was an administrative-territorial unit (guberniya) of the Russian Empire, established in 1744 from territories ceded by Sweden to Russia in two successive conflicts: the Great Northern War (1700–1721), concluded by the Treaty of Nystad, and the Russo-Swedish War (1741–1743), concluded by the Treaty of Åbo. These areas were initially attached to the Saint Petersburg Governorate before being reorganized as a separate governorate with its capital in Vyborg (Viipuri).

The administrative reforms under Catherine II transformed the governorate into Vyborg Viceroyalty in 1784. The reforms were largely abandoned after her death in 1796. In 1802, the governorate was officially renamed the Finland Governorate.

The region is often referred to as Old Finland (Note: Finnish: Vanha Suomi; Russian: Ста́рая Финля́ндия, romanized: Staraya Finlyandiya; Swedish: Gamla Finland) to distinguish it from the parts of Finland which remained under Swedish rule. Following Russia's victory in the Finnish War (1808–1809), Sweden ceded the rest of Finland. The newly conquered regions were organized as the autonomous Grand Duchy of Finland ("New Finland"). In 1812, Old Finland was incorporated into the Grand Duchy as Vyborg Province.

Old Finland retained many Swedish-era laws and institutions under Russian rule, creating a distinct legal and administrative identity.

== Formation ==
In the Treaty of Nystad of 1721, Sweden formally ceded control of parts of the Viborg and Nyslott County and the Kexholm County located on the Karelian Isthmus and Lake Ladoga region to Russia. First these areas were part of the Saint Petersburg Governorate. Vyborg Governorate was established in 1744 when Sweden ceded control of parts of Kymmenegård and Nyslott County (which had been parts of Viborg and Nyslott County prior to the Treaty of Nystad) by the Treaty of Åbo.

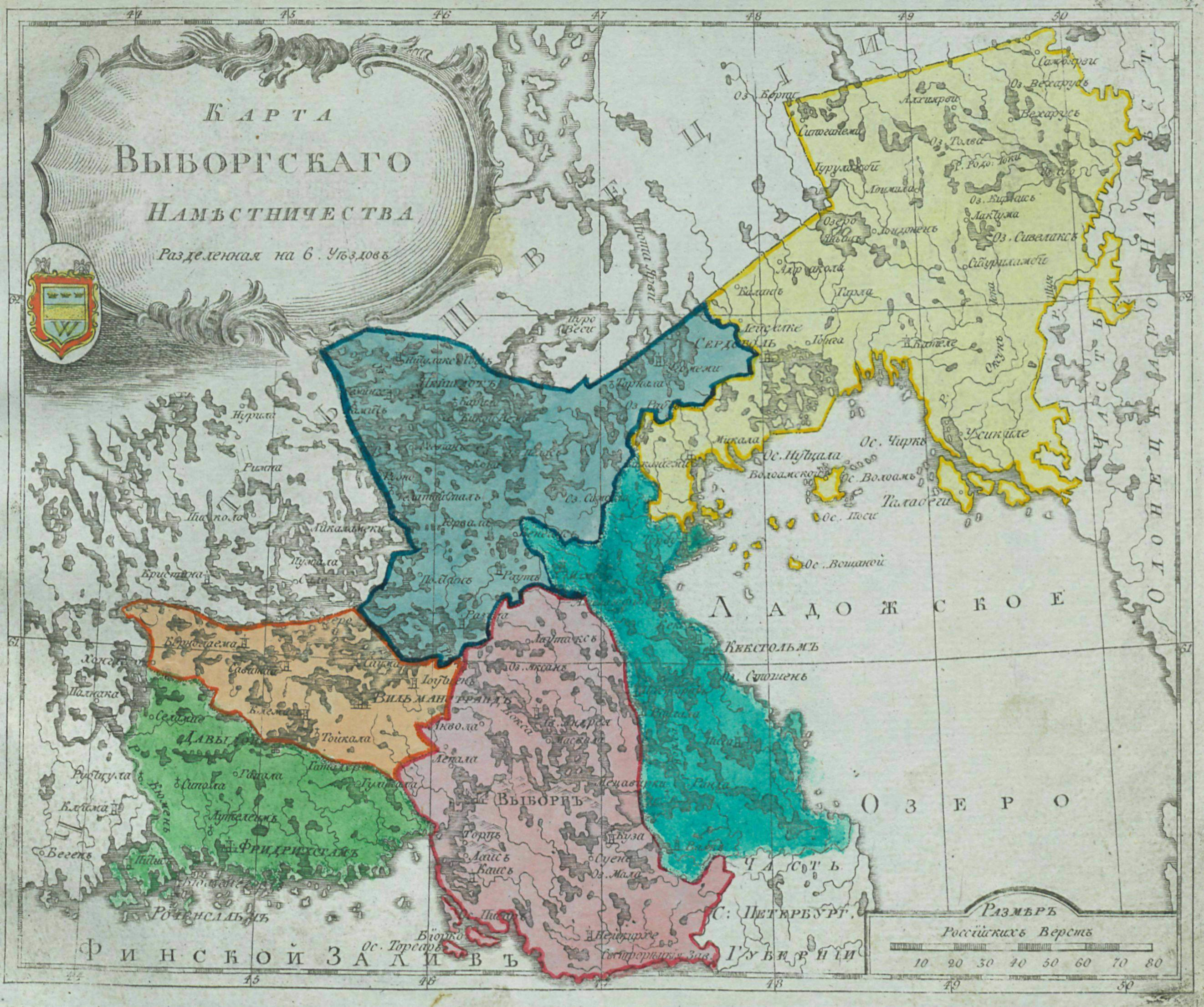
Map of the Vyborg Viceroyalty with its six uyezds, 1792.

Initially the governorate had subdivision into three provinces: Kymi Province, Vyborg Province and Kexholm Province, which reflected the previous borders of the Swedish counties (part of Kymmenegård and Nyslott County ceded in 1743, part of Viborg and Nyslott County ceded in 1721 and part of Kexholm County ceded in 1721, respectively). Catherine the Great issued a decree in 1775 to change the previous administrative division from governorates to viceroyalties (namestnichestvo), and in 1784 the Vyborg Governorate was renamed into Vyborg Viceroyalty (Russian: Выборгское наместничество, romanized: Vyborgskoye namestnichestvo, however in Finnish the name did not change) within its previous borders. The subdivision was also changed, from provinces into uyezds (Russian: уе́зд, Finnish: kihlakunta), of which there were 6 in the viceroyalty: Wilmanstrand, Vyborg, Friedrichshaven, Nijschlott, Kexholm and Serdobol. (Note: Russia used Baltic/Low German names for the cities instead of Swedish in the Vyborg Province/Viceroyalty, and contemporary Russian names are transliterations of them.) Paul I changed the name back to Vyborg Governorate in 1796, renaming the previous uyezds into districts (German: Lands Kommissariat, Russian: округ, romanized: okrug, Finnish: kihlakunta).

In 1802, King Gustav IV Adolf of Sweden revived the title Grand Duke of Finland for his second son, Prince Carl Gustaf. Russia objected, and Emperor Alexander I responded by renaming the Vyborg Governorate as the Finland Governorate in December 1802. Prince Carl Gustaf died three years later in 1805.

== Legal situation ==
The Russian emperor guaranteed religion, property rights, old Swedish laws, and some privileges to the inhabitants of these territories. However, a circumvention occurred, as the Russian administrators and Russian military were unfamiliar with the Swedish system. The Russians were used to a different system with its serfs, serfdom. As a result, the economy of the area was markedly different from that on the Swedish side of the border.

The territories enjoyed a sort of autonomy and much particularism, since the Russian rulers applied similar principles here as in the Baltic Provinces. The administration resembled a German principality, rather than a Russian province.

Ecclesiastically, the areas were administered as a diocese, but without a bishop. The church building in Viipuri and another in Hamina were assigned as cathedrals, with a diocesan chapter ("consistory"), led by the archdean.

The area was not forced to contribute men to the Russian Army until 1797. However, there were many non-Finnish troops in the area, especially after the 1788–90 war.

Scandinavian-style district courts continued in judicial function, each with a judge and lay members. However, the Russian estate owners and military often ignored these courts' decisions and imposed illegal punishments on the peasants.

Because of the absence of an evenly applied, up-to-date legal system in the area, apathy in some ways dominated among Old Finland's residents; and not many figures from the area have a prominent place in history. Two of these are Maximilian von Alopeus and his brother David Alopaeus, born into a Finnish family in Viipuri and both later serving many posts in Imperial administration, including ambassador in some Central European countries.

== Integration with the Grand Duchy of Finland ==
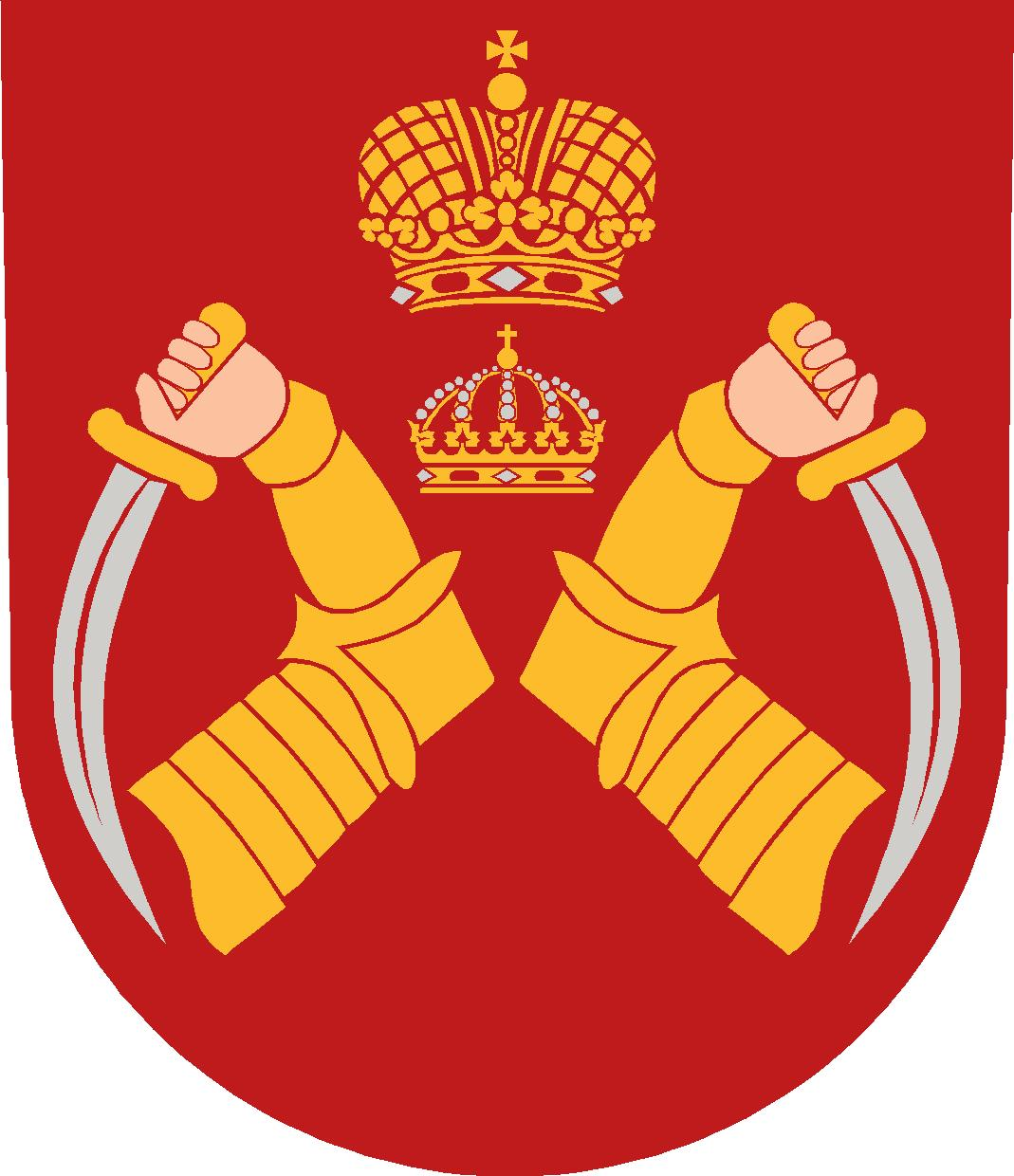
Coat of arms 1788–1811

During the Napoleonic Wars, the Kingdom of Sweden had allied itself with the Russian Empire, United Kingdom and the other parties against Napoleonic France. However, following the Treaty of Tilsit in 1807, Russia made peace with France. In 1808, and supported by France, Russia successfully challenged Swedish control over Finland in the Finnish War. In the Treaty of Fredrikshamn on September 17, 1809, Sweden was obliged to cede all its territory in Finland, east of the Torne River, to Russia. The ceded territories became a part of the Russian Empire and was reconstituted into the Grand Duchy of Finland, with the Russian tsar as the grand duke.

In 1812, the area of Vyborg Governorate was transferred from Russia proper to the grand duchy and established as Viipuri Province. The transfer, announced by Tsar Alexander I just before Christmas, on December 23, 1811 O.S. (January 4, 1812 N.S.), can be seen as a symbolic gesture and an attempt to appease the sentiment of the Finnish population, which had just experienced Russian conquest of their country by force in the Finnish War.

Some of the legal developments in Sweden during the 18th century had not been introduced in Old Finland: the Viipuri and Käkisalmi territory did not adopt the 1734 General Law of Sweden (though Hamina (Fredrikshamn), Lappeenranta (Villmanstrand), and Savonlinna (Nyslott), at the time still Swedish, of course did adopt it), and the new constitution of King Gustav III was not implemented in the entire area.

After integration, the inhabitants of Old Finland were gradually brought under the same legal system as the rest of the grand duchy, including its Constitution and General Law, although some privileges took time to implement. The so-called donated estates (owned by Russian noblemen) in Karelia were a headache resolved slowly by monetary compensation from the Grand Duchy's Treasury. This was a long lasting burden, as the last instance of compensation was not until the 1870s.

== Governors ==
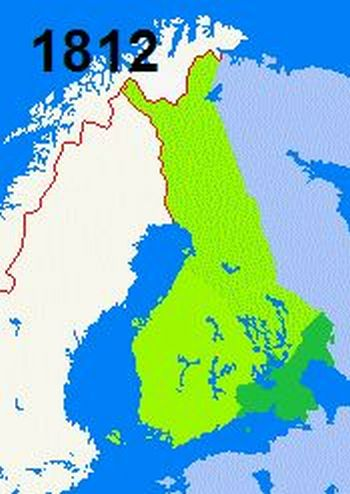
The annexation of Vyborg Governorate to the Grand Duchy of Finland in 1812

- 1744–1744 Yury Nikitich Repnin
- 1745–1752 Afanasiy Isakov (acting)
- 1752–1754 Johann Christoph von Keyser
- 1754–1766 Afanasiy Isakov
- 1766–1778 Nikolaus Hendrik von Engelhardt
- 1779–1780 Yevgeny Petrovich Kashkin
- 1780–1782 Pyotr Alekseyevich Stupishin
- 1782–1785 Wilhelm Heinrich von Engelhardt
- 1785–1785 Alexander von Peutling
- 1785–1793 Karl Johann von Günzel (acting)
- 1793–1797 Fyodor Pavlovich Shcherbatov
- 1797–1799 Karl Magnus von Rüdinger
- 1799–1799 Pyotr Vasilyevich Zheltuhin
- 1799–1804 Magnus Orraeus
- 1804–1808 Nikolay Fyodorovich Emin
- 1808–1811 Ivan Jakovlevich Buharin
- 1811–1812 Johan Gustaf Winter

== See also ==
- Fief of Viborg
- Finnish Karelia
- History of the administrative division of Russia
- South-Eastern Finland fortification system
