= Tuula Linnainmaa =

Finnish politician (born 1942)

Minister of Transport and Communications
- In office 1995–1997
- Prime Minister: Paavo Lipponen
- Preceded by: Ole Norrback
- Succeeded by: Matti Aura

Member of the Finnish Parliament
- In office 1987–1997
- Constituency: Uusimaa

Governor — Southern Finland Province
- In office 1997–2003

Personal details
- Born: Tuula Maj-Lis Forss; 8 January 1942 (age 84) Hämeenlinna, Finland
- Party: National Coalition Party
- Website: Official website

Tuula Linnainmaa (née Forss; born 8 January 1942) is a retired Finnish politician representing the National Coalition Party. She served as a Member of Parliament for the Uusimaa constituency in 1987–1997, and as the transport minister in the first Lipponen cabinet in 1995–1997. In 1997, she was appointed the inaugural Governor (Finnish: Maaherra) of the newly-formed Southern Finland Province, serving there until 2003. She was also active for many years in local politics, as a member of the Espoo City Council.
