= Väinö Meltti =

Väinö Johannes Meltti (12 March 1898 in Viipuri – 3 May 1964) was a Finnish journalist, educationist, and politician. He was a member of the Parliament of Finland in 1941 and again from 1944 to 1945. Between 1941 and 1944, he was in prison for political reasons. Meltti was originally a member of the Social Democratic Party of Finland (SDP). After he was freed from prison, he joined the Finnish People's Democratic League (SKDL) and the Socialist Unity Party (SYP), a member organisation of the SKDL. From 1946 to 1964, Meltti was Governor of Uusimaa Province.
