= Savolax and Kymmenegård County =

County of Sweden from 1747 to 1775

Savolax and Kymmenegård County Savolax och Kymmenegårds län Kymenkartanon ja Savon lääni
- County of Kingdom of Sweden
- 1747–1775
- Capital: Lovisa^{1}
- History
  - Established: 1747
  - Disestablished: 1775
Preceded by
County of Kymmenegård and Nyslott
- ^{1} Finnish: Loviisa

Savolax and Kymmenegård County, or Kymenkartano and Savo Province, (Note: Swedish: Savolax och Kymmenegårds län, Finnish: Kymenkartanon ja Savon lääni. In Finnish contexts, lääni or län is usually translated as 'province', while in Swedish contexts, län is usually translated as 'county'.) was a county of the Kingdom of Sweden (located in what is now southeastern Finland) from 1747 to 1775.

In 1743, following the Russo-Swedish War of 1741–1743, part of the Kymmenegård and Nyslott County, including the county capital of Villmanstrand (Lappeenranta), was ceded to Russia in the Treaty of Åbo (Turku). The remaining part of the county was merged in 1747 with some territories from Nyland and Tavastehus County to a new county of Savolax and Kymmenegård. The county capital was moved to Lovisa (Loviisa).

In 1775 the county was split into the Savolax and Karelia County and the Kymmenegård County.

== Maps ==
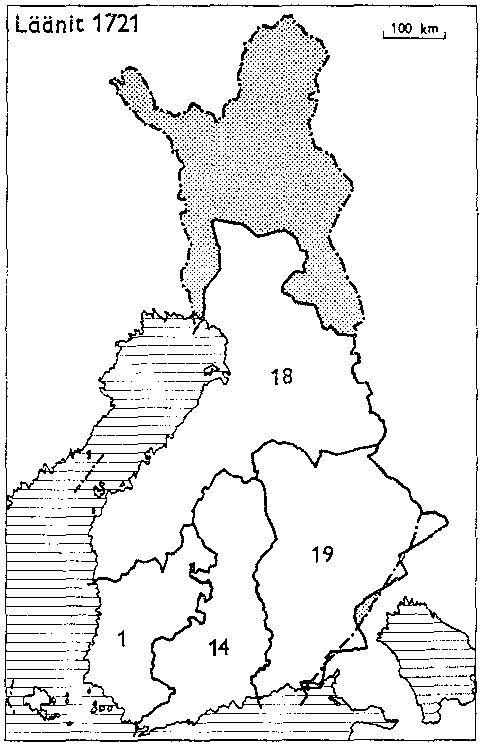
Provinces of Finland 1721: 1: Turku and Pori, 14: Nyland and Tavastehus, 18: Ostrobothnia, 19: Kymmenegård and Nyslott

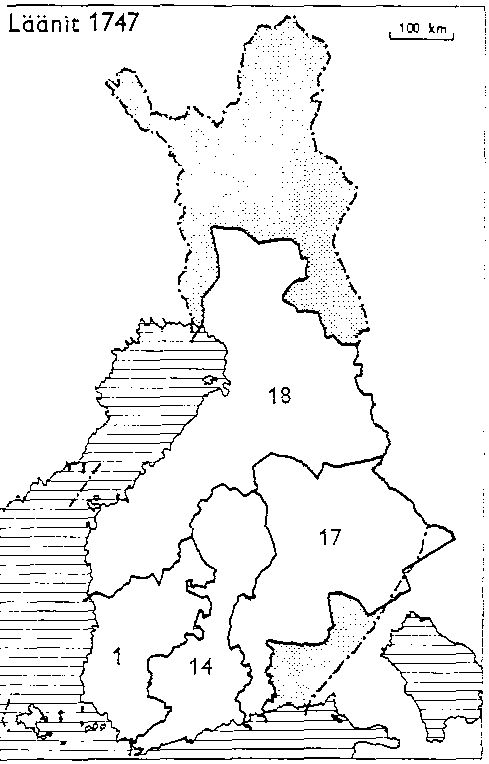
Provinces of Finland 1747: 1: Turku and Pori, 14: Nyland and Tavastehus, 17: Savolax and Kymmenegård, 18: Ostrobothnia

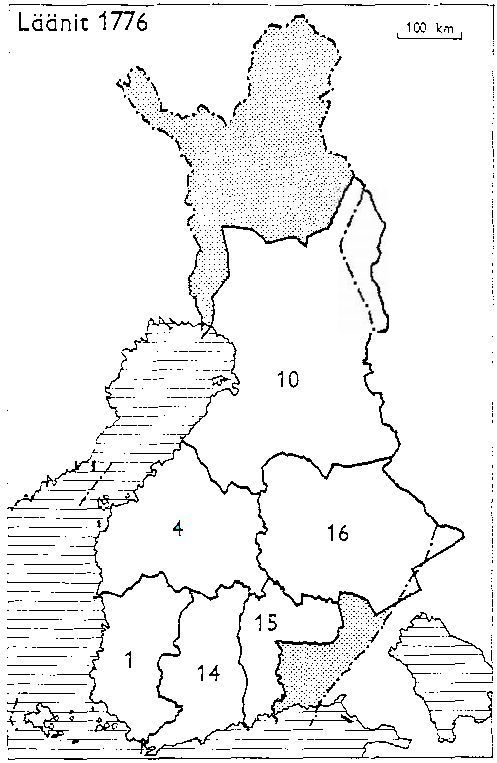
Provinces of Finland 1776: 1: Turku and Pori, 4: Vaasa, 10: Oulu, 14: Nyland and Tavastehus, 15: Kymmenegård, 16: Savolax and Karelia

== Governors ==
- Henrik Jacob Wrede af Elimä 1747–1753
- Anders Johan Nordenskjöld 1753–1756
- Otto Wilhelm De Geer 1757–1765
- Anders Henrik Ramsay 1765–1774
