= Arthur Brofeldt =

Finnish politician

Arthur Brofeldt (27 January 1868, in Taipalsaari – 27 August 1928) was a Finnish politician. He was a member of the Senate of Finland.
