= Johan Ulrik Sebastian Gripenberg =

Finnish politician

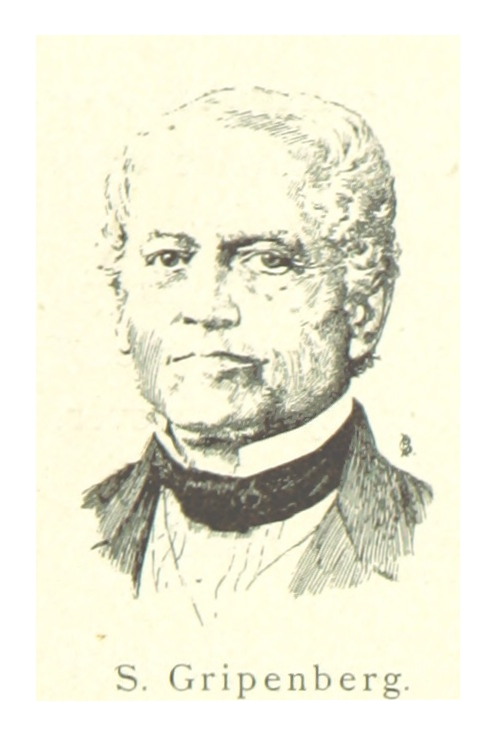
Johan Ulrik Sebastian Gripenberg

Johan Ulrik Sebastian Gripenberg (14 September 1795 in Sääksmäki – 12 October 1869 in Kirkkonummi) was a Finnish politician. He was a member of the Senate of Finland.
