= Nyland and Tavastehus County =

Nyland and Tavastehus County Nylands och Tavastehus län Uudenmaan ja Hämeen lääni
- County of the Swedish Empire 1634–1809; Province of Grand Duchy of Finland 1809–1831
- 1634–1831
- Capital: Tavastehus
- History
  - Established: 1634
  - Disestablished: 1831
Succeeded by
Uusimaa Province; Häme Province
- ^{1} Finnish: Häme

Nyland and Tavastehus County, or Uusimaa and Häme Province, (Note: Swedish: Nylands och Tavastehus län, Finnish: Uudenmaan ja Hämeen lääni. In Finnish contexts, lääni or län is usually translated as 'province', while in Swedish contexts, län is usually translated as 'county'.) was a county of the Swedish Empire from 1634 to 1809, and a county of Grand Duchy of Finland from 1809 to 1831.

In 1775 whole northern part of the county (later Central Finland region) was transferred to the new Vasa County. Also a part of historical Satakunta was added to the Nyland and Tavastehus County from the Åbo and Björneborg County, while Upper Hollola was transferred to the new Kymmenegård County.

By the Treaty of Fredrikshamn in 1809 Sweden ceded all its territories in Finland, east of the Torne River, to Russia. The county still continued to exist as a province of the new autonomous Grand Duchy of Finland until 1831, when it was split to Tavastehus County (Häme Province) and Nyland County (Uusimaa Province).

== Maps ==
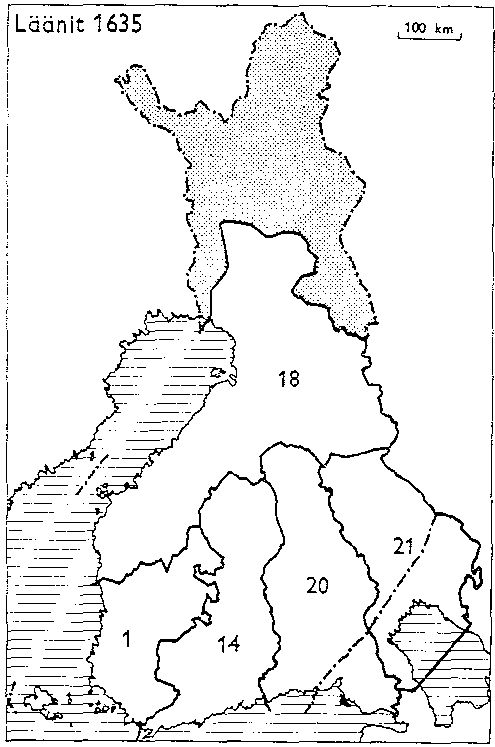
Provinces of Finland 1634: 1: Turku and Pori, 14: Nyland and Tavastehus, 18: Ostrobothnia, 20: Viborg and Nyslott, 21: Kexholm

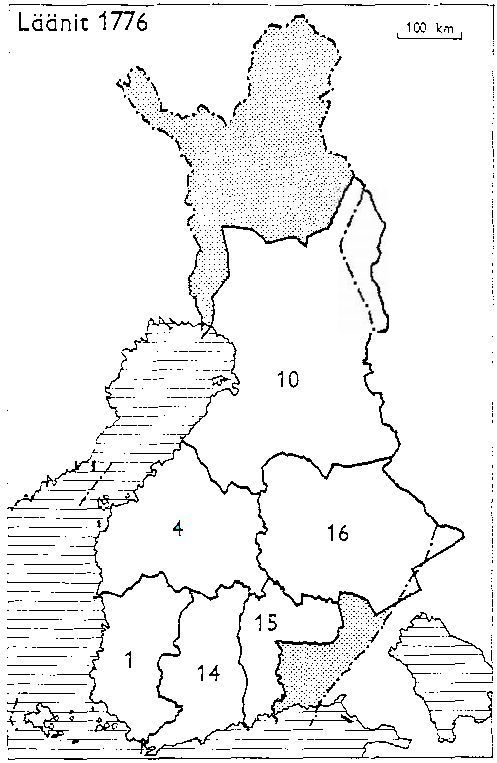
Provinces of Finland 1776: 1: Turku and Pori, 4: Vaasa, 10: Oulu, 14: Nyland and Tavastehus, 15: Kymmenegård, 16: Savolax and Karelia

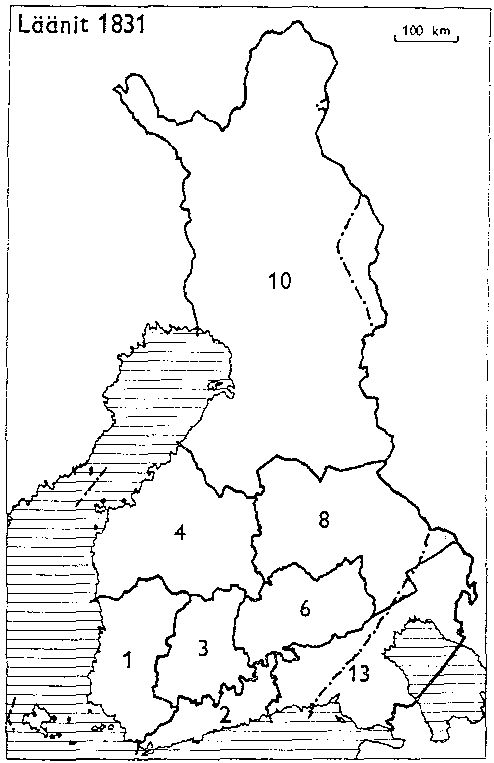
Provinces of Finland 1831: 1: Turku and Pori, 2: Uusimaa, 3: Häme, 4: Vaasa, 6: Mikkeli, 8: Kuopio, 10: Oulu, 13: Viipuri

== Governors ==
- Arvid Göransson Horn af Kanckas 1634–1640
- Arvid Göransson Horn af Kanckas 1640–1648 (Tavastehus County)
- Reinhold Mettstake 1640–1642 (Nyland County)
- Jacob Uggla 1642–1648 (Nyland County)
- Erik Andersson Oxe 1648–1652
- Ernst Johan Greutz 1652–1666
- Udde Knutsson Ödell 1666–1668
- Axel Eriksson Stålarm 1668–1678
- Axel Rosenhane 1678–1685
- Jonas Klingstedt 1685–1687
- Karl Bonde 1687–1695
- Mårten Lindhielm 1695–1696
- Abraham Cronhjort 1696–1703
- Johan Creutz 1703–1719
- Per Stierncrantz 1719–1737
- Axel Erik Gyllenstierna af Lundholm 1737–1746
- Gustaf Samuel Gylleborg 1746–1756
- Anders Johan Nordenskjöld 1756–1761
- Hans Erik Boije af Gennäs 1761–1772
- Carl Ribbing af Koberg 1773
- Anders Henrik Ramsay 1774–1776
- Anders de Bruce 1777–1786
- Carl Gustaf Armfelt 1787–1788
- Johan Henrik Munck 1790–1809
- Gustaf Fredrik Stiernwall 1810–1815
- Gustaf Hjärne 1816–1828
- Carl Klick 1828–1831

== Sources ==
- Lääninhallinto 350 vuotta / Länsförvaltningen 350 år (in Finnish and Swedish). Helsinki: Sisäasiainministeriö / Inrikesministeriet. 1986. ISBN 951-46-8896-1.
- Tiihonen, Seppo (1984). Suomen hallintohistoria (in Finnish). Helsinki: Valtion Painatuskeskus. ISBN 951-9314-32-6.
- Haapala, Pertti; Toivo, Raisa Maria (2007). Suomen historian kartasto (in Finnish). Helsinki: Karttakeskus. ISBN 978-951-593-029-3.
