= Treaty of Fredrikshamn =

1809 treaty between Sweden and Imperial Russia which ended the Finnish War

Coordinates: 60°34′N 27°11′E

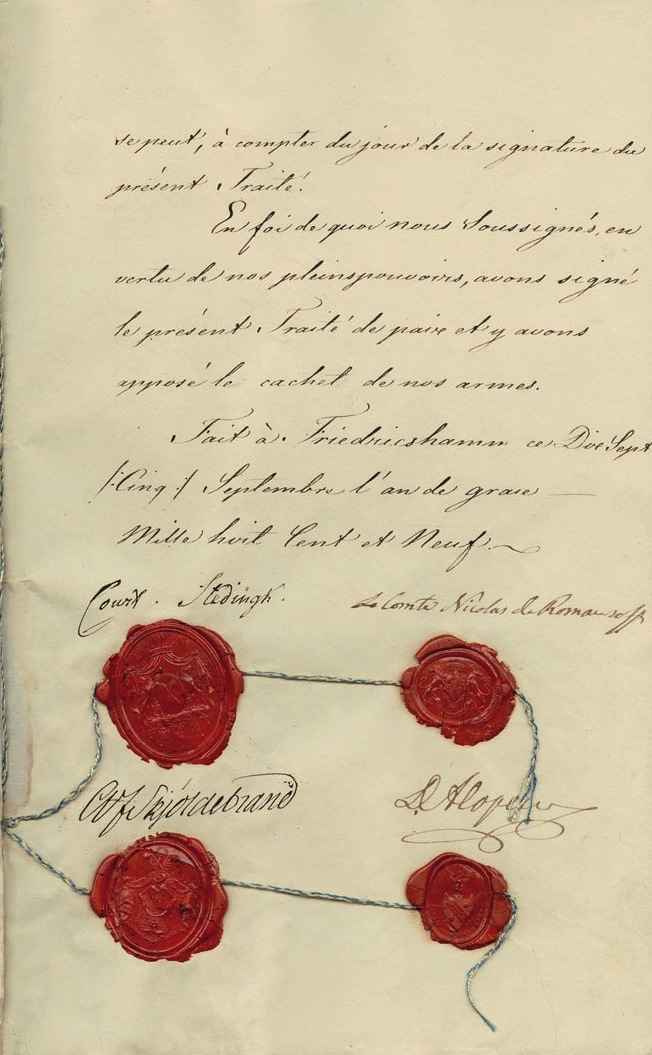
- Final page of the treaty
- Signed: 17 September 1809
- Location: Fredrikshamn, Russia
- Original signatories: Sweden; Russia

Map showing territory changes at the end of the Finnish War. Modern country boundaries are indicated by dotted red lines.

The Treaty of Fredrikshamn, or the Treaty of Hamina, (Note: Swedish: Freden i Fredrikshamn; Russian: Фридрихсгамский мирный договор; Finnish: Haminan rauha) was a peace treaty concluded between Sweden and Imperial Russia on 17 September 1809. The treaty concluded the Finnish War and was signed in the Finnish town of Fredrikshamn (Hamina). Russia was represented by Nikolay Rumyantsev and David Alopaeus (Russian ambassador to Stockholm), while Sweden by Infantry General Kurt von Stedingk (former Swedish ambassador to Saint Petersburg) and Colonel Anders Fredrik Skjöldebrand.

In the treaty, Sweden ceded Finnish territories to Russia.

== Terms ==
According to the treaty Sweden ceded parts of the provinces Lappland and Västerbotten (east of Tornio River and Muonio River), Åland, and all provinces east thereof. The ceded territories came to constitute the Grand Duchy of Finland, to which also the Russian 18th century conquests of parts of Karelia and Savonia (later to be called Old Finland), were joined in 1812 as Viborg County. Together with the Diet of Porvoo (1809), and the Oath of the Sovereign, the Treaty of Fredrikshamn constitutes the cornerstone for the autonomous grand duchy, its own administration and institutions, and thereby a start of the development which would lead to the revival of Finnish culture, to equal position of the Finnish language, and ultimately in 1917 to Finland's independence.

A reference to Emperor Alexander's promise to retain old laws and privileges in Finland was included, but the treaty overstepped any formal guarantees of the legal position of Finland's inhabitants. The Russians refused, and the Swedes were not in a position to insist. Similar clauses had been common in peace treaties, but they were also regularly circumvented. At the period of Russification of Finland, 90 years later, the Russian government argued that the treaty was not violated and hence no outside party had any right to intervene, the question being solely a matter of the Emperor who had granted the original promise.

During the negotiations, Swedish representatives had namely endeavoured to escape the loss of the Åland islands, "the fore-posts of Stockholm," as Napoleon rightly described them. The Åland islands were culturally, ethnically and linguistically purely Swedish, but such facts were of no significance at that time. In the course of the 19th century, it would also turn out that the Åland islands were a British interest, which, after the Crimean War, led to the demilitarization of the islands according to the Åland Convention included in the Treaty of Paris (1856). During the War of the Sixth Coalition, Russia and Sweden concluded an alliance directed against France (5 April 1812). They planned to effect a landing in Swedish Pomerania, which had been overrun by the French. Russia promised to press Denmark into ceding Norway to Sweden. It was understood that the United Kingdom would join the treaty too, but that never came to pass. Other plans failed to materialise due to Napoleon's invasion of Russia.

== Literature ==
- Похлебкин В.В. (1995) Внешняя политика Руси, России и СССР за 1000 лет в именах, датах, фактах: Справочник, М.: Междунар. отношения –

Pokhlebkin, V.V. (1995) Foreign policy of Russia, Russia and the USSR in 1000 years: the names, the dates, the facts: a reference book, Moscow : International Relations, ISBN 5-7133-0845-6 (in Russian)
