= Gustavian era =

Period of Swedish history from 1772 to 1809

- 1772–1809
Age of Liberty	New Constitution and Union
- Location: Sweden
- Monarch(s): Gustav III; Gustav IV Adolf; Charles XIII
- Key events: Revolution of 1772; Russo-Swedish War; Assassination of Gustav III; Dano-Swedish War

The history of Sweden from 1772 to 1809 is better known as the Gustavian era (Swedish: Gustavianska tiden) of kings Gustav III and Gustav IV Adolf, as well as the reign of King Charles XIII.

== Gustav III ==
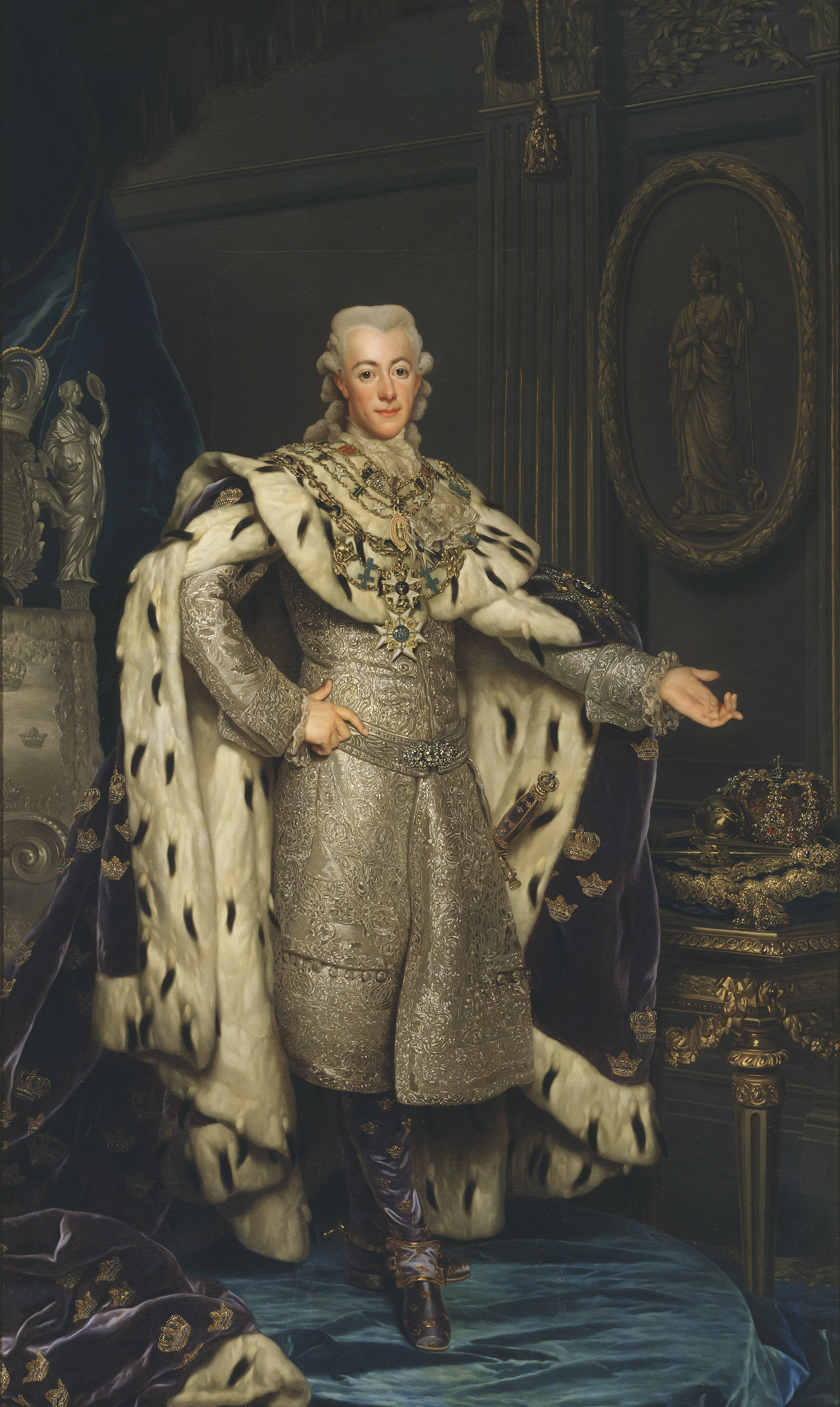
King Gustav III

Adolf Frederick of Sweden died on 12 February 1771. The elections afterward resulted in a partial victory for the Caps party, especially among the lower orders; but in the estate of the peasantry the Caps majority was merely nominal, while the mass of the nobility was opposed to the party. However, no action could be taken until the new king, Gustav III, returned from Paris, where he had been on a visit when his father died.

=== Coronation oath ===
The new coronation oath contained three revolutionary clauses:

1. The first aimed at making abdications in the future impossible by binding the king to reign uninterruptedly.
2. The second obliged him to abide, not by the decision of all the estates together, as heretofore, but by that of the majority only, with the view of enabling the actually dominant lower estates (in which there was a large Cap majority) to rule without the nobility.
3. The third clause required him, in all cases of preferment, to be guided not "principally" as heretofore, but "solely" by merit.

All through 1771 the estates wrangled over the clauses. An attempt of the king to mediate foundered on the suspicions of the estate of burgesses, and on 24 February 1772. the nobility yielded.

=== Constitution ===
Map of the Kingdom of Sweden in 1789

The non-noble Cap majority now proceeded to attack the Privy Council. the Riksrådet, the last stronghold of the Hats, and, on 25 April of that year, it succeeded in ousting them. It was now, for the first time, that Gustav began to consider the possibility of a revolution.

The new constitution of 20 August 1772 which Gustav III imposed upon the Riksdag of the Estates, converted a weak and disunited republic into a strong but limited monarchy. The estates could assemble only when summoned by him; he could dismiss them whenever he thought fit; and their deliberations were to be confined exclusively to the propositions which he laid before them. But these extensive powers were subjected to important checks. Thus, without the previous consent of the estates, no new law could be imposed, no old law abolished, no offensive war undertaken, no extraordinary war subsidy levied. The estates alone could tax themselves; they had the absolute control of the Riksbank – the Bank of Sweden, and the right of controlling the national expenditure.

In Sweden, the change was most popular. But Gustav's first Riksdag, that of 1778, opened the eyes of the deputies to the fact that their political supremacy had departed. The king was now their sovereign lord; and, for all his courtesy and gentleness, the jealousy with which he guarded and the vigour with which he enforced the prerogative plainly showed that he meant to remain so. But it was not till after eight years more had elapsed that actual trouble began. The Riksdag of 1778 had been obsequious; the Riksdag of 1786 was mutinous. It rejected nearly all the royal measures outright, or so modified them that Gustav himself withdrew them. When he dismissed the estates, the speech from the throne held out no prospect of their speedy revocation.

Nevertheless, within three years, the king was obliged to summon another Riksdag, which met at Stockholm on 26 January 1789. His attempt in the interval to rule without a parliament had been disastrous. It was only by a breach of his own constitution that he had been able to declare war against Russia in April 1788; the Conspiracy of Anjala (July) had paralysed all military operations at the very opening of the campaign; and the sudden invasion of his western provinces by the Danes, almost simultaneously (September), seemed to bring him to the verge of ruin. But the contrast, at this crisis, between his self-sacrificing patriotism and the treachery of the Russophil aristocracy was so striking that, when the Riksdag assembled, Gustav found that the three lower estates were ultra-royalist, and with their aid he succeeded, not without running great risks in crushing the opposition of the nobility by a second coup d'état on 16 February 1789 and passing the famous Act of Union and Security which gave the king an absolutely free hand as regards foreign affairs and the command of the army, and made further treason impossible. The nobility never forgave him.

=== Foreign affairs ===
Abroad, the Swedish revolution made a great sensation. Catherine II of Russia concluded a secret alliance with Denmark, in which the Swedish revolution was described as "an act of violence" justifying both powers in seizing the first favourable opportunity for intervention to restore the Swedish constitution of 1720.

Unknown to party leaders, Gustav had renewed the Swedish alliance with France and had received solemn assurances of assistance from Louis XV of France if Gustav were to reestablish monarchical rule in Sweden. Moreover, France agreed to pay its outstanding subsidies to Sweden, amounting to 1.5 million livres annually, beginning from January 1772. What's more, Charles Gravier, comte de Vergennes, was to be sent to Stockholm to circumvent the designs of Russia just as he had previously done in the Sublime Porte at Constantinople.

== Gustav IV Adolf ==
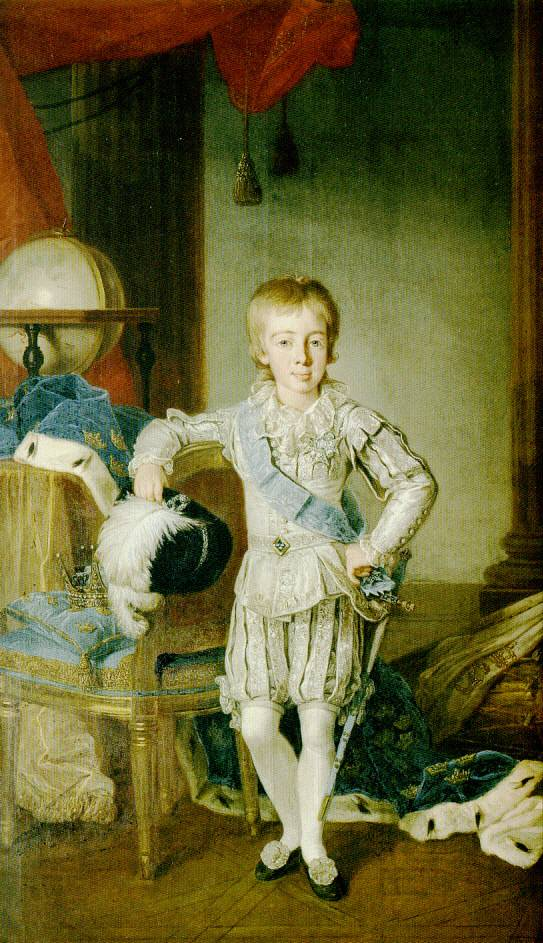
Gustav IV Adolf at the age of 7

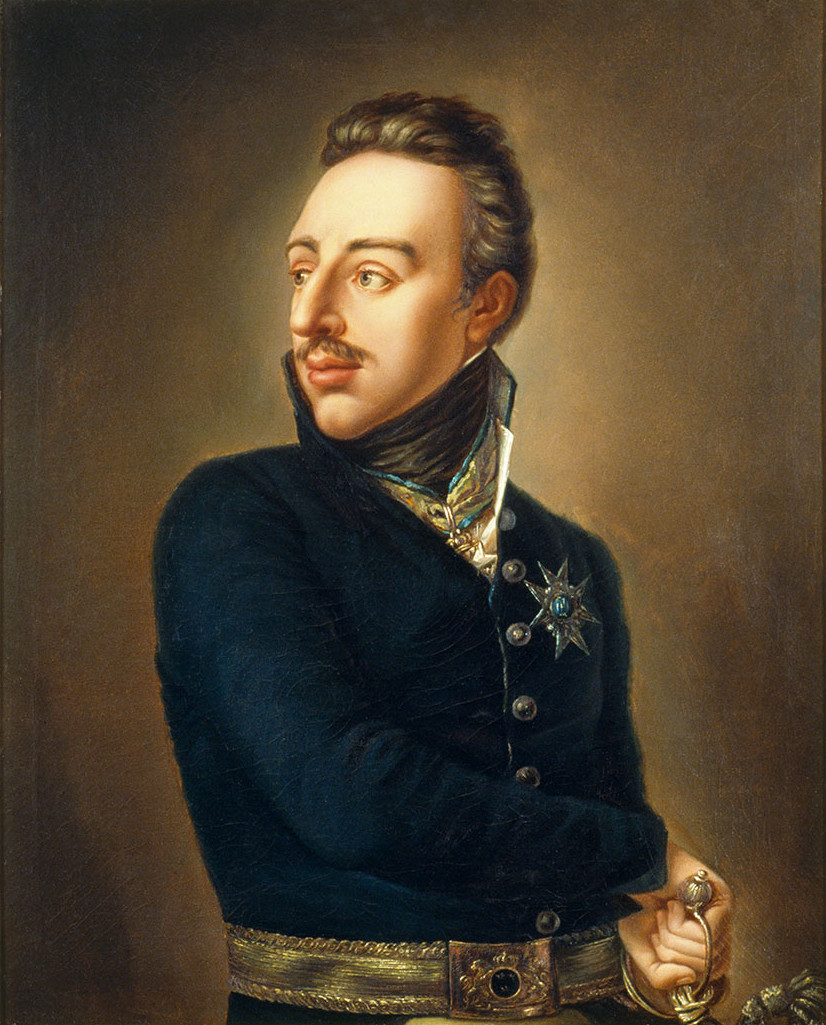
Gustav IV Adolf at the age of 19

=== Reuterholm ===
The new king Gustav IV Adolf, still a minor, was brought up among Jacobins. During the king's minority, Gustaf Reuterholm virtually ruled Sweden. After the execution of Louis XVI on 21 January 1793, Sweden recognized the new French republic, and secret negotiations for contracting an alliance were begun in May of the same year until the protests of Catherine of Russia, supported by all the other European powers, finally induced Sweden to suspend them.

The negotiations with the French Jacobins exacerbated the hatred which Gustav's supporters felt for the Jacobin counselors of Charles, the duke-regent, later Charles XIII. They formed a conspiracy to overthrow the government, led by Gustaf Mauritz Armfelt, which was to have been supported by a Russian fleet and a rising of the Dalecarlians. The conspiracy was discovered and vigorously suppressed.

=== Rapprochement ===
A rapprochement took place between the Scandinavian kingdoms during the revolutionary wars. Thus, on 27 March 1794, a neutrality compact was formed between with Denmark and Sweden; and their united squadrons patrolled the North Sea to prevent their merchantmen from being seized by British ships. The French Republic was officially recognized by the Swedish government on 23 April 1795. In return, Sweden received a subsidy and a treaty between the two powers was signed on 14 September 1795. But an attempt to regain the friendship of Russia, which had broken off diplomatic relations with Sweden, was frustrated by the refusal of the king to accept as his bride the Russian grand duchess Alexandra, whom Reuterholm had provided. This was Reuterholm's last official act. On 1 November 1796, Gustav Adolf at age 18 took the government into his own hands.

=== Gustavian government ===
The government of Gustav IV Adolf was almost a pure autocracy. At his very first Riksdag, held at Norrköping in March 1800, the nobility were compelled to ratify Gustav III's Act of Union and Security.

A notable change took place in Sweden's foreign policy in December 1800 when Denmark, Sweden and Russia acceded to a Second League of Armed Neutrality directed against Britain. Hitherto Sweden had kept aloof from continental complications, but the arrest and execution of the Duc d'Enghien in 1804 inspired Gustav Adolf with such a hatred of Napoleon that when a general coalition was formed against the French emperor he was one of the first to join it (3 December 1804), pledging himself to send an army corps to link up with British and Russian forces and drive the French out of the Batavian Republic and Hanover. But his quarrel with Frederick William III of Prussia detained him in Pomerania, and when at last in December 1805 he led his 6,000 men towards the Elbe district, the third coalition had already been dissipated by the victories of Ulm and Austerlitz.

In 1806, a rupture between Sweden and Prussia was prevented only by Napoleon's assault upon the latter power. After Jena, Napoleon attempted to win over Sweden, but Gustav rejected every overture. The result was the total loss of Swedish Pomerania, and the Swedish army was saved from destruction only by the ingenuity of Johan Christopher Toll. At Tilsit the emperor Alexander I of Russia had undertaken to compel "Russia's geographical enemy", as Napoleon designated Sweden, to accede to the newly established "Continental Russian System". Gustav Adolf rejected all the proposals of Alexander to close the Baltic to British ships, but he took no measures to defend Finland against Russia. On 21 February 1808, a Russian army crossed the Finnish border. On 2 April, the king ordered a general levy of 30,000 men.

== Charles XIII ==
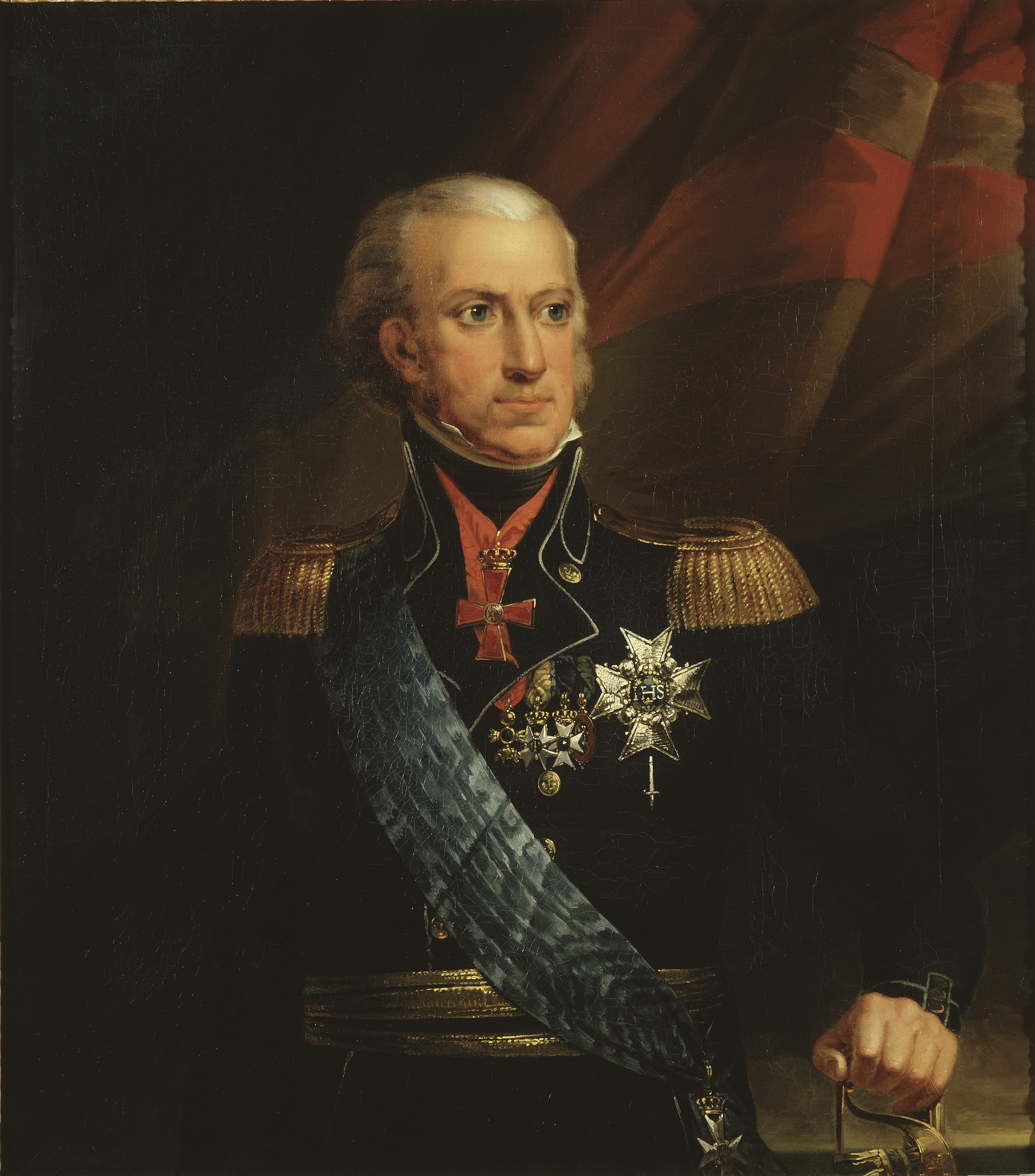
Charles XIII

The immediate consequence of the Russian invasion was the deposition of Gustav Adolf by the Coup of 1809 on 13 March 1809, and the exclusion of his whole family from the succession. On 5 June 1809, the duke regent was proclaimed king, under the title of Charles XIII, after accepting the new liberal constitution, which was ratified by the Riksdag of the Estates the same day. Peace negotiations had been opened at Fredrikshamn, but the war carried on. Defeats at the Battle of Sävar and Battle of Ratan on 19 and 20 August 1809, broke the spirit of the Swedish Army; and peace was obtained by the surrender of all Finland, the Åland islands, "the fore-posts of Stockholm", as Napoleon described them, and Västerbotten and Lappland as far as the rivers of Torneå and Muonio at the Treaty of Fredrikshamn, on 17 September 1809.

== See also ==
- Category:Sweden during the Gustavian era
- Category:Early modern history of Sweden
- Category:Finland under Swedish rule
- Gustavians
- Gustavian style
