= Simpele =

- Former municipality
- Simpeleen kunta Simpele kommun
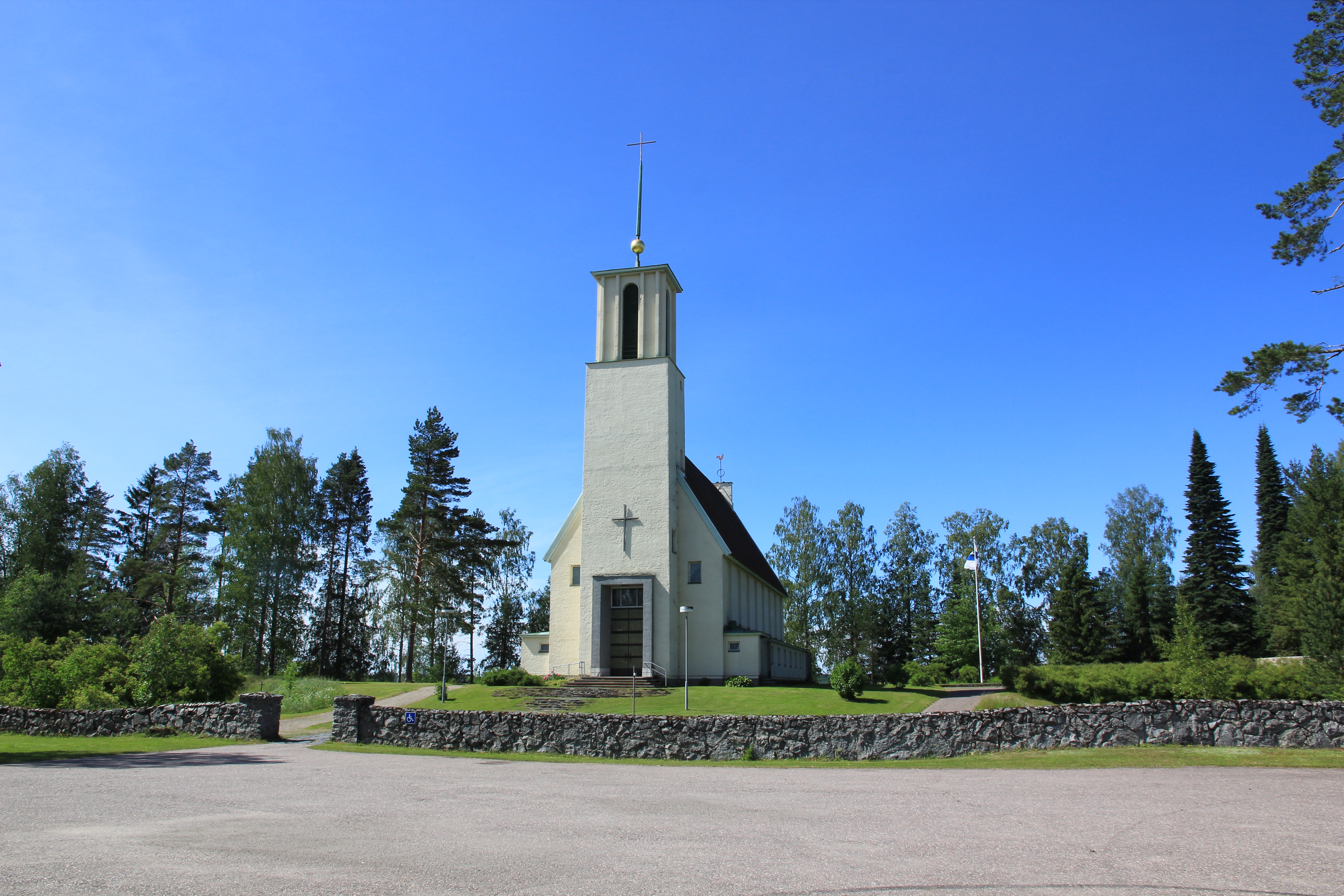
- Church in Simpele

- Coat of arms

- Location of Simpele in Finland
- Coordinates: 61.4323°N 29.3728°E
- Country: Finland
- Province: Kymi Province
- Region: South Karelia
- Established: 1923
- Merged into Rautjärvi: 1973
- Seat: Simpele

Area
  - Land: 41.16 km^{2} (15.89 sq mi)

Population (1972-12-31)
  - Total: 3,893

Simpele is an urban area and a former municipality of Finland in the South Karelia region, originally in the Viipuri Province and after the Second World War, the Kymi Province. It was consolidated with Rautjärvi in 1973, becoming its new administrative center.

Simpele is an industrial area specializing in forestry. Over half of Rautjärvi's population lives in Simpele.

== Geography ==
Simpele is located at the southern end of Simpelejärvi lake and grew around Simpele papermill founded next to the outlet river of the lake. Although Simpele is named after Simpelejärvi, the lake is mostly located within Parikkala.

The municipality bordered Rautjärvi and Parikkala. Before the concessions of the Second World War, it also bordered Hiitola. Like Parikkala, Saari and Uukuniemi, Simpele is traditionally seen as belonging to Ladoga Karelia.

The distance to Imatra is 40 km, while the distance to Lappeenranta and Savonlinna is 80 km.

== History ==
The original settlements in the area were the villages of Kivijärvi and Änkilä, belonging to the Parikkala parish. Änkilä was first mentioned in 1589 as Engilä.

Industrialization began in the late 19th century with the construction of a sawmill and a brick factory near the Juvankoski rapids. A paper factory was established in 1906. In 1917, a town plan for Simpele was made by Uno Ullberg. It became a separate parish in 1920 (functionally 1922) and a municipality in 1923. The southeastern part of the municipality was ceded to the Soviet Union in the Moscow Peace Treaty, however the main area remained Finnish. Most of the initial development of Simpele was done by the owners of the factories. More suburbs were built between the 1950s and 1970s.

Simpele remained an independent municipality until 1973, when it was consolidated with Rautjärvi. Rautjärvi's administrative seat was moved from Miettilä to Simpele.

== Economy ==
Simpele has a cardboard factory owned by Metsä Board. It also produced paper until 2010. It is one of Europe's most productive cardboard factories.
