= Rautjärvi Church =

- Finnish: Rautjärven kirkko
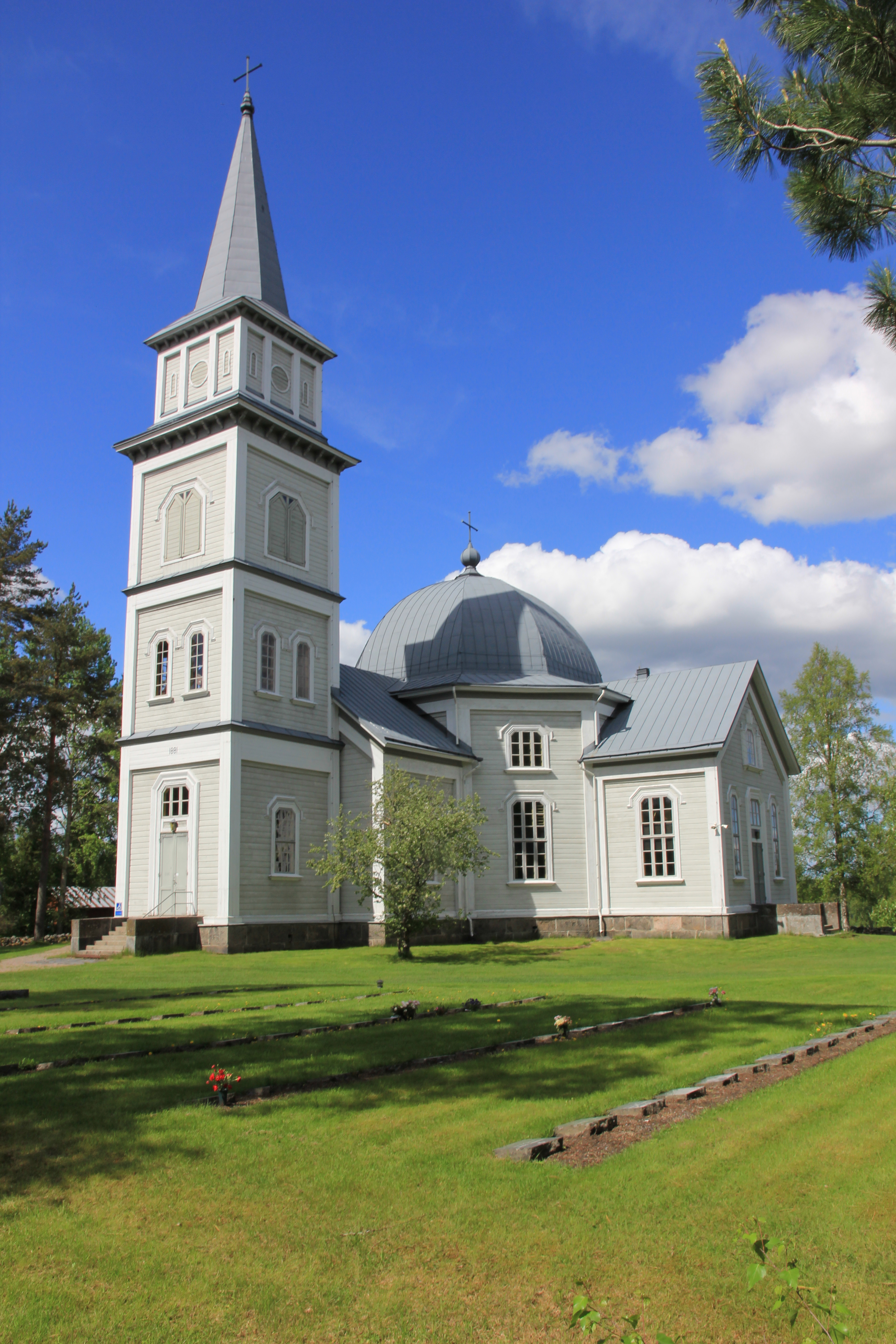
- Rautjärvi Church in 2014
- Rautjärvi Church
- 61.299549°N 29.130250°E
- Location: Miettiläntie 1757, Rautjärvi
- Country: Finland
- Denomination: Evangelical Lutheran Church of Finland

Architecture
- Architect: A. J. Jansson
- Completed: 1881
- Demolished: 2022

Specifications
- Capacity: 1 200

Administration
- Diocese: Diocese of Mikkeli
- Parish: Ruokolahti

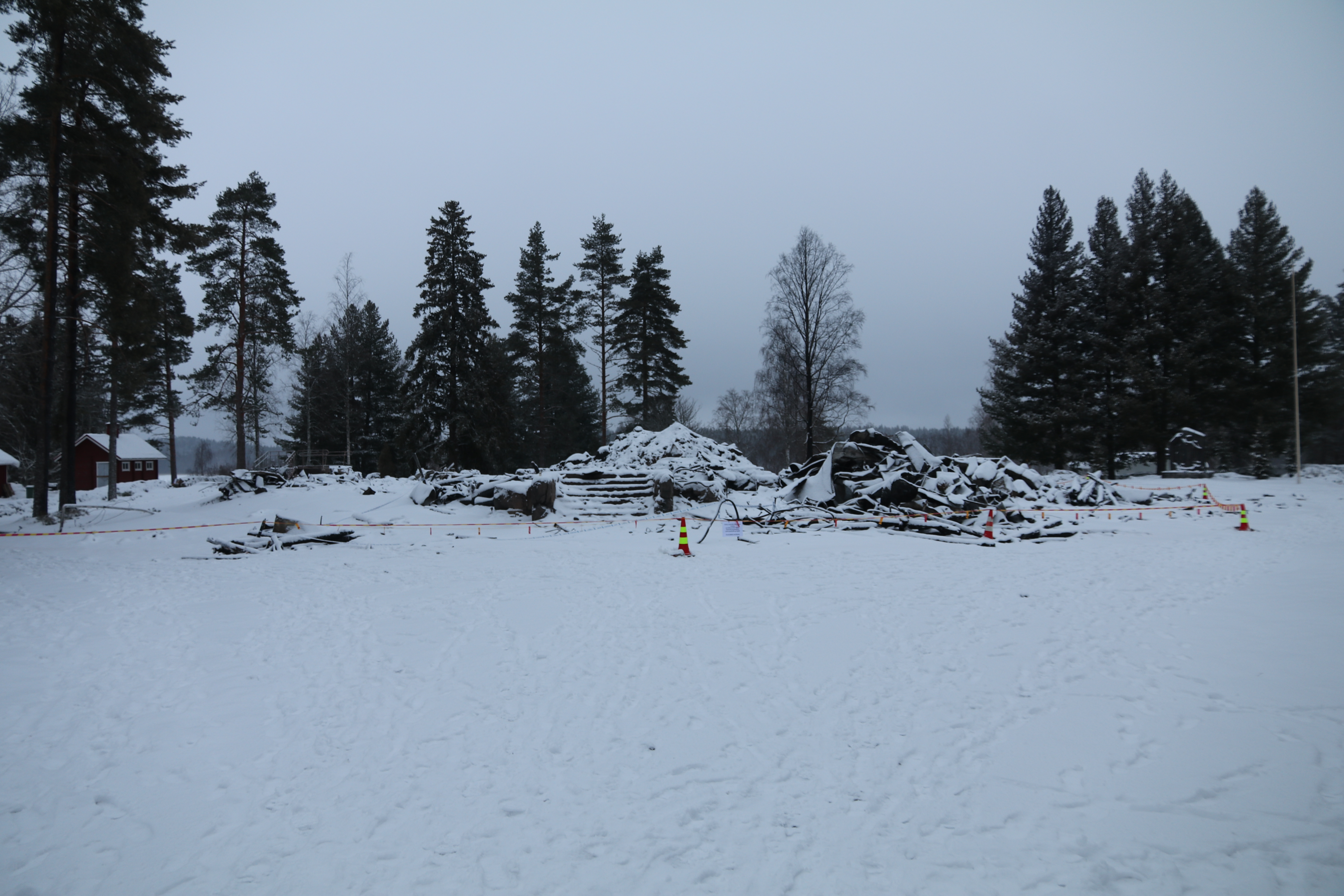
Church ruins a week after the fire

Rautjärvi Church was a 1881 completed wooden church in Rautjärvi, Finland. It was destroyed by fire on Christmas Day 2022. The church was set on fire during the morning service by an elderly man who was later found dead. Before the arson, the church was listed as one of the regionally significant cultural environments in South Karelia.
