= Viljakainen =

Viljakainen is a Finnish surname.

== Geographical distribution ==
As of 2014, 88.0% of all known bearers of the surname Viljakainen were residents of Finland (frequency 1:4,325), 5.1% of Estonia (1:18,105), 4.2% of Sweden (1:164,113) and 1.9% of Canada (1:1,362,889).

In Finland, the frequency of the surname was higher than national average (1:4,325) in the following regions:

1. Southern Savonia (1:524)
2. Päijänne Tavastia (1:1,930)
3. Northern Savonia (1:2,950)
4. Kymenlaakso (1:3,165)
5. South Karelia (1:3,236)
6. Central Finland (1:4,057)
7. Uusimaa (1:4,244)

== People ==
- Kalle Viljakainen (1853–1913), Finnish journalist and politician
