= Hugo Manninen =

Finnish politician (1902–1990)

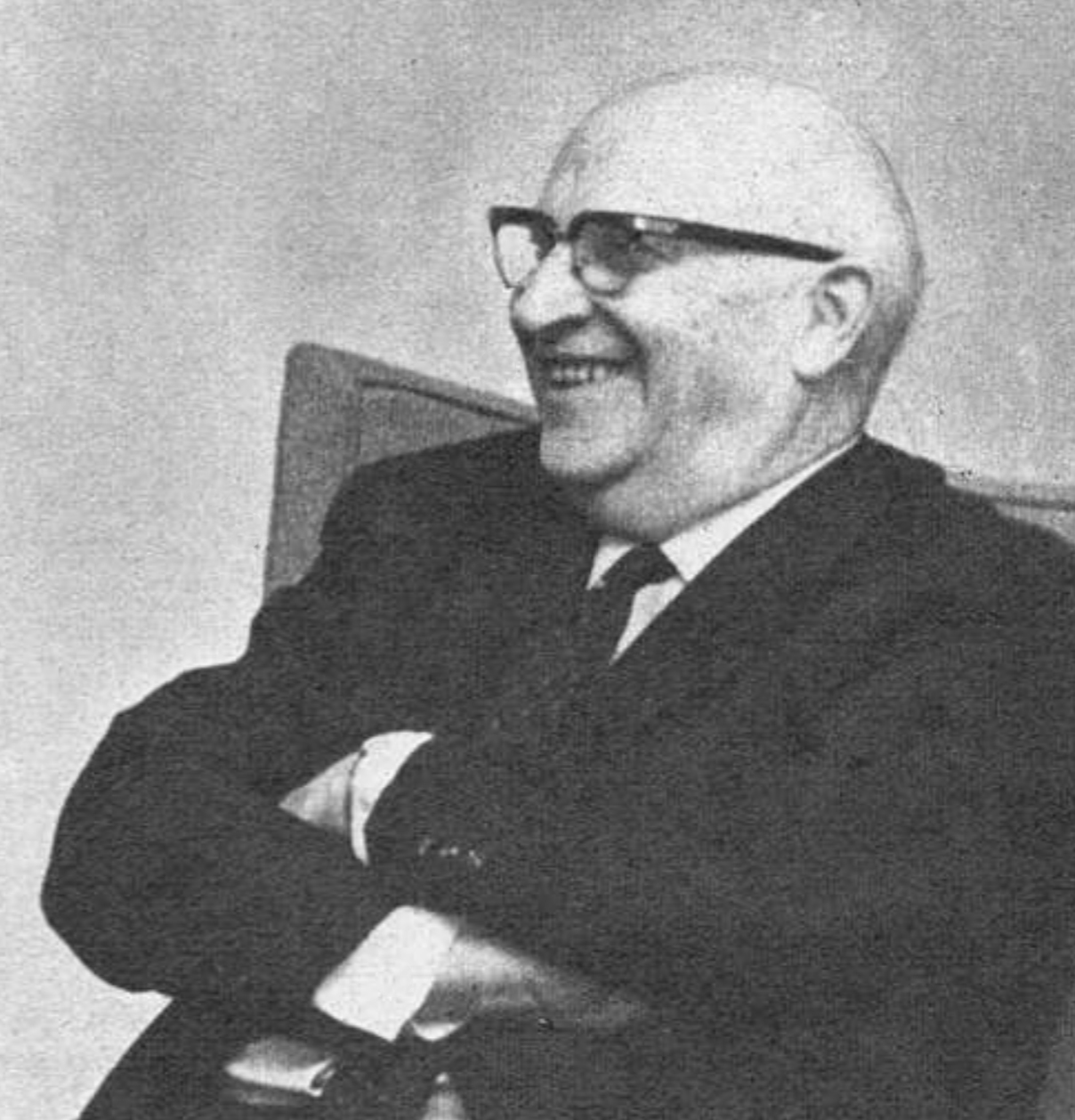

Hugo Teofilus Manninen (5 August 1902, Taipalsaari – 26 November 1990) was a Finnish consumers' co-operative manager and politician. He served as a Member of the Parliament of Finland from 1945 to 1970, representing the Finnish People's Democratic League (SKDL).
