= Juho Keltanen =

Finnish farmer and politician (1849–1922)

Juho Keltanen (5 September 1849 – 14 January 1922) was a Finnish farmer and politician, born in Ruokolahti. He was a member of the Parliament of Finland from 1909 to 1910, representing the Young Finnish Party.
