= LAB University of Applied Sciences =

Institute of higher education in Finland

- LAB-ammattikorkeakoulu
- Motto: The Best of Both Worlds
- Established: 2020
- Rector: Turo Kilpeläinen
- Total staff: 600 (2024)
- Students: 10,425 (2024)
- Location: (Finland) Lahti and Lappeenranta, Finland
- Website: lab.fi

LAB University of Applied Sciences (Finnish: LAB-ammattikorkeakoulu) is a Finnish university of applied sciences that operates in Lahti, Lappeenranta and online. LAB started its operations on January 1, 2020, when Lahti University of Applied Sciences (LAMK) and Saimaa University of Applied Sciences (SAIMIA) merged.

LAB is the sixth largest university of applied sciences in Finland in terms of number of students. Approximately 10,400 students study there and about 600 teachers and RDI-specialist work there. The rector of the school is Turo Kilpeläinen.

== Studies ==
LAB operates in the fields of business, tourism and hospitality, technology, design and fine arts, health care and social services. Work placement is an essential part of the studies and includes projects that are implemented in cooperation with companies in the field.

The scope of bachelor's degree is 210–240 ECTS, depending on the field of study. The studies usually last 3.5 to 4 years. Master's degree studies, on the other hand, are about 60–90 credits and takes about 2 years to complete. Students from outside the EU are charged a tuition fee.

In Lahti, LAB Institute of Design and Fine Arts continues the long-standing traditions of the Lahti Institute of Design and Imatra School of Visual Arts, offering programmes in the fields of design and visual communication.

== Campuses ==
LAB University of Applied Sciences has campuses in Lahti, Lappeenranta and online.

=== Lahti campus ===
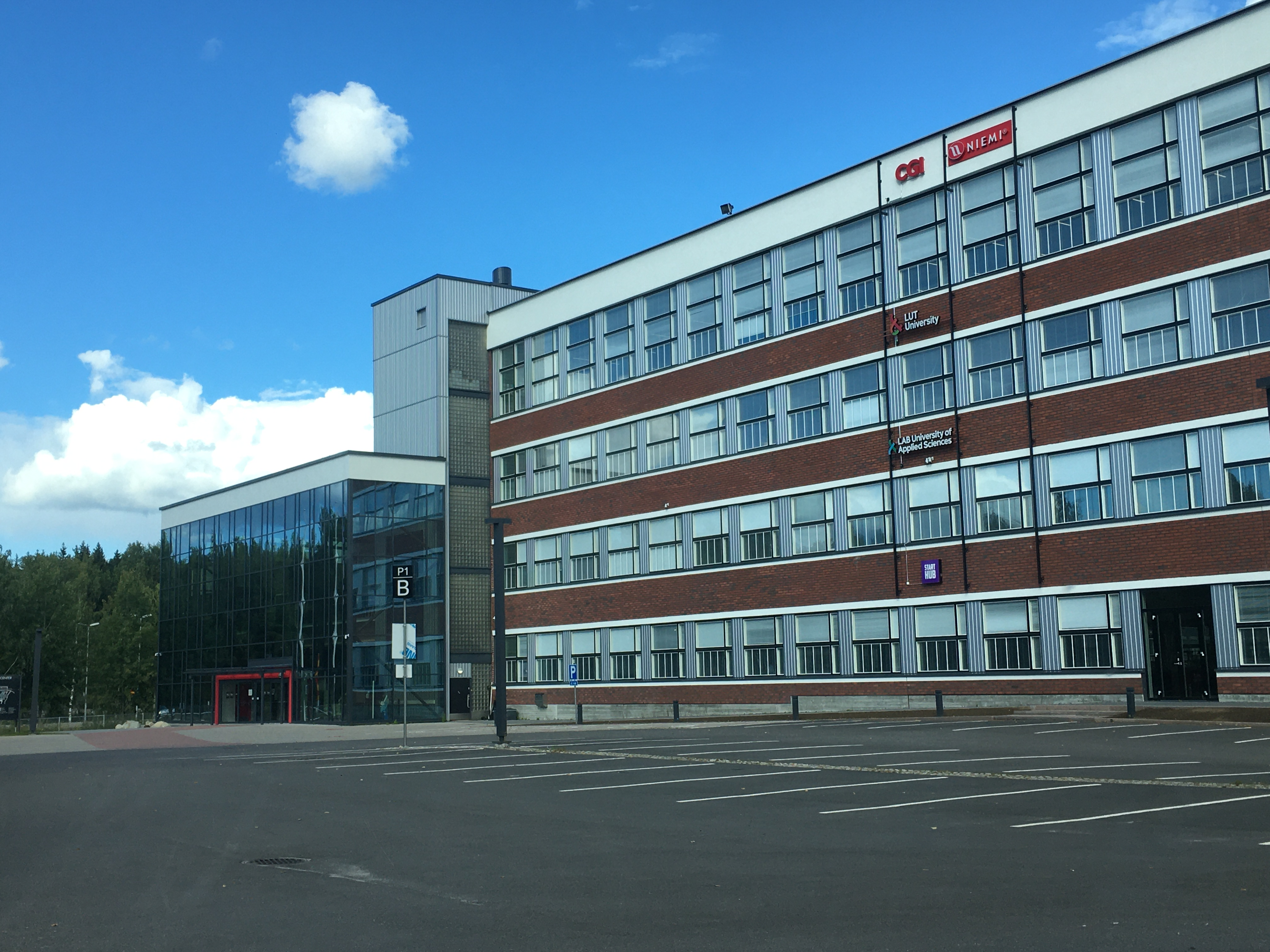
Main building of the Lahti campus in August 2020.

Lahti campus (NiemiCampus) is one campus area located in the Niemi district, and it operates in two different buildings. The main building has been renovated into the former premises of the Isku furniture factory at Mukkulankatu 19. Less than half a kilometer away is the Lahti Science Park, at Niemenkatu 73, where part of the school's activities are located. The Lahti campus has a total of approximately 6,000 students, of which approximately 600 are international degree students.

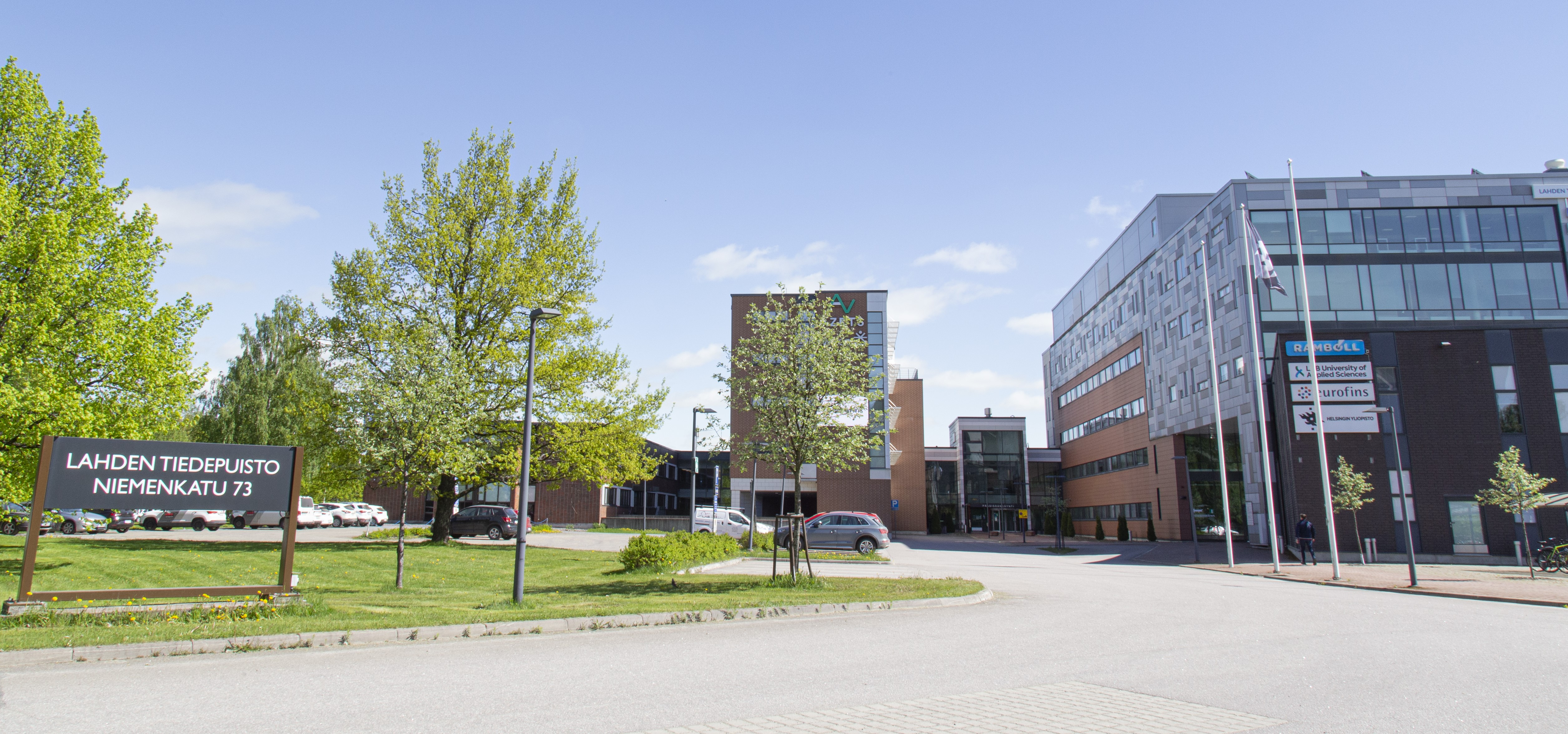
Lahti Science Park in May 2021.

=== Lappeenranta campus ===
Lappeenranta campus is located at Yliopistonkatu 36, which is in the district of Skinnarila. The campus is shared with LUT University, and it is the largest university campus in Southeast Finland. About 10,000 people work in there, of which about 3,600 are LAB students.

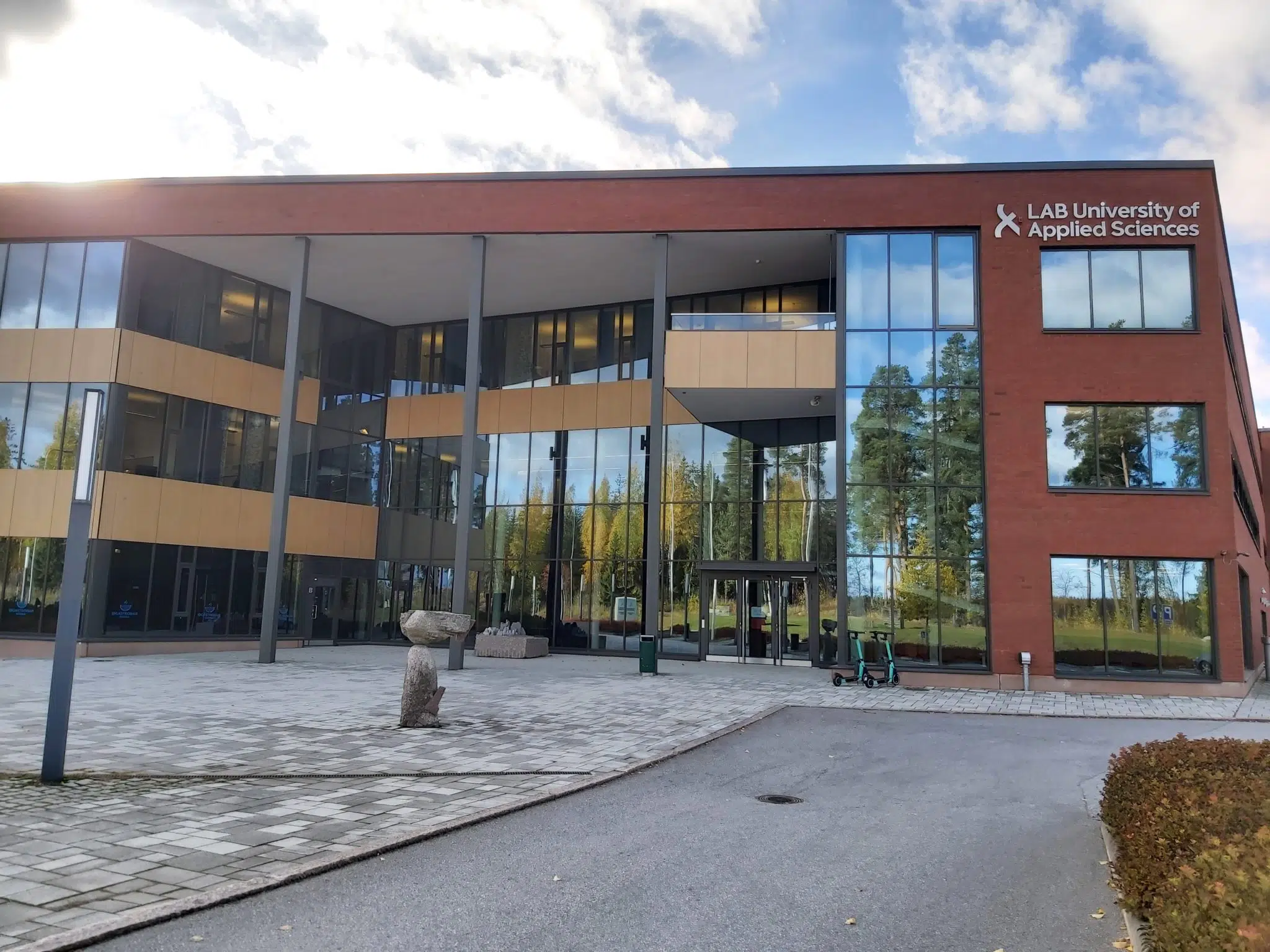
Lappeenranta campus in October 2022.

=== E-campus ===
Online studies at E-campus include studying in Moodle and other electronic learning environments, real-time online meetings and interactive group work online. In addition, online studies include projects that can be implemented independently and periods of professional training in working life.

== LUT Universities ==
LAB and LUT University together form the higher education community LUT Universities. A total of about 16,500 students study in the education community and about 1,800 experts work there. The community shares common higher education services and uses common systems and campus facilities in Lahti and Lappeenranta.

== Student union KOE ==
KOE is the student union of LAB, and it aims to monitor the interests of students and the quality of teaching. Their task is to make the voice of the students heard in the decision-making. In addition, their student tutors help to get the students' studies off to a smooth start, and the various events and leisure activities they organize aim to bring a suitable counterbalance to the studies.

== Student associations ==
In LAB, a total of 12 student associations operate on the campuses, the purpose of which is to unite students in the same field, promote their interests and organize activities in close cooperation with the student union KOE.

Lahti campus

LASOLA ry – health care and social services

Linkki ry – business

LIRO ry – engineering

Lymo ry – environmental engineering

MIO ry – design

PINO ry – wood engineering

ReLa ry – tourism and hospitality

Lappeenranta campus

LaGeR ry – tourism and hospitality

LaKOSTE ry – health care and social services

LaKu ry – fine arts

LapIO – engineering

LapTOp ry – business
