= LUT University =

University in Lappeenranta and Lahti, Finland

Lappeenranta-Lahti University of Technology LUT
- Lappeenrannan-Lahden teknillinen yliopisto LUT (Finnish)
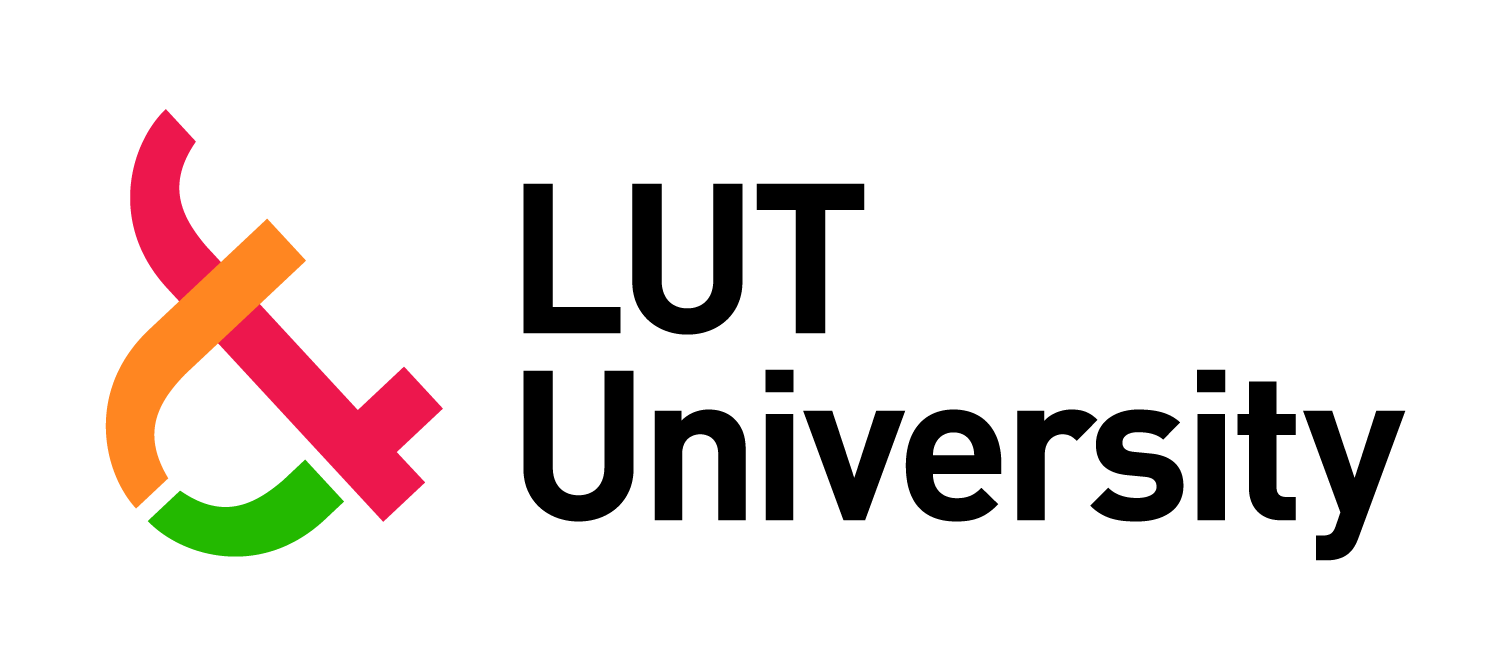
- Latin: Universitatis Lappeenrantaensis
- Other names: LUT, LUT University (Finnish: LUT-yliopisto, Swedish: LUT-universitet)
- Former names: LTKK (Lappeenrannan teknillinen korkeakoulu), LTY (Lappeenrannan teknillinen yliopisto)
- Motto: Uteliaiden yliopisto
- Motto in English: Land of the curious
- Type: Public
- Established: 1969; 57 years ago
- Endowment: ~120,000,000€ (2021)
- Chairman: Teresa Kemppi-Vasama
- President: Juha-Matti Saksa
- Academic staff: 788 (2023)
- Total staff: 1,380 (2023)
- Students: 7,770 (2023)
- Location: Lappeenranta, Lahti, Finland
- Language: Finnish, English
- Colors
- Website: http://www.lut.fi/en - English site http://www.lut.fi/fi - Finnish site

Lappeenranta-Lahti University of Technology LUT (Finnish: Lappeenrannan-Lahden teknillinen yliopisto LUT), better known by the abbreviation LUT University (Finnish: LUT-yliopisto) is a Finnish public research university which was established in 1969. The university's Lappeenranta campus is situated on the shore of lake Saimaa – the 4th largest lake in Europe. LUT University's second campus is in the Finnish city of Lahti. The university also has research units in the Finnish cities of Mikkeli and Kouvola, as well as a regional office in Brussels, Belgium.

LUT University is split into two schools of engineering and technology, a school of business and a department of social sciences. The schools focus on renewable and sustainable technologies such as clean water and air, renewable energy, circular economy and the impact of technology on society.

There are 1,380 staff members and 7,770 students in the university. Over 5,000 students reside in the Lappeenranta campus area, and the Lahti campus hosts around 1,000 students. The university also has 701 students attending Open University and 621 students in continuing education. Over 15% of the university's student population is international and the school has a representation of 98 different nationalities

LUT University is a public university under the advisory of the Finnish government. LUT University and LAB University of Applied Sciences form the higher education organization LUT Universities. LUT University is a theoretical research university branch that focuses on academics and research, while LAB University of Applied Sciences is a career oriented school with practical innovation.

== History ==
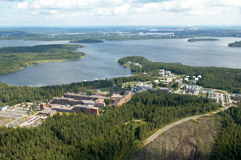
Aerial view of the LUT Lappeenranta campus

In the 1950s, the Finnish government noticed that the country lacked accessible higher education, with most of the universities in Finland at that time being located in Helsinki and a few other cities that were largely out of reach for the average Finn. This caused a reform of the higher education system in Finland that would eventually lead to the creation of several universities in the following decades. The Finnish government made plans to establish the University of Eastern Finland in various cities, eventually landing on Lappeenranta, Kuopio and Joensuu as candidate cities. It was recognized that each city needed a university, but were too small population wise to support a complete university, hence the future university would be split, with each city teaching a specific subject, with the engineering and technical education being placed in Lappeenranta. The three new universities would be called Lappeenrannan teknillinen korkeakoulu (LTKK), Kuopion Korkeakoulu (University of Kuopio), and Joensuun Korkeakoulu (University of Joensuu). LTKK was the third and newest technical university, after TKK and TTKK.

LTKK would start its operations in the city center of Lappeenranta in 1969 with a class of 39 students. The first buildings of the current Skinnarila district campus were completed in 1974. In 1991, a department of business was also added to the university. In 2003, LTKK would change names to Lappeenrannan teknillinen yliopisto (LTY/LUT). Generally in Finland, universities would be named korkeakoulu if they had only a few study fields and subjects, with universities that had multiple fields of study carrying the yliopisto name. The english name of the university, Lappeenranta University of Technology, would be used more frequently, and the abbreviation LUT would become synonymous with the university in Lappeenranta.

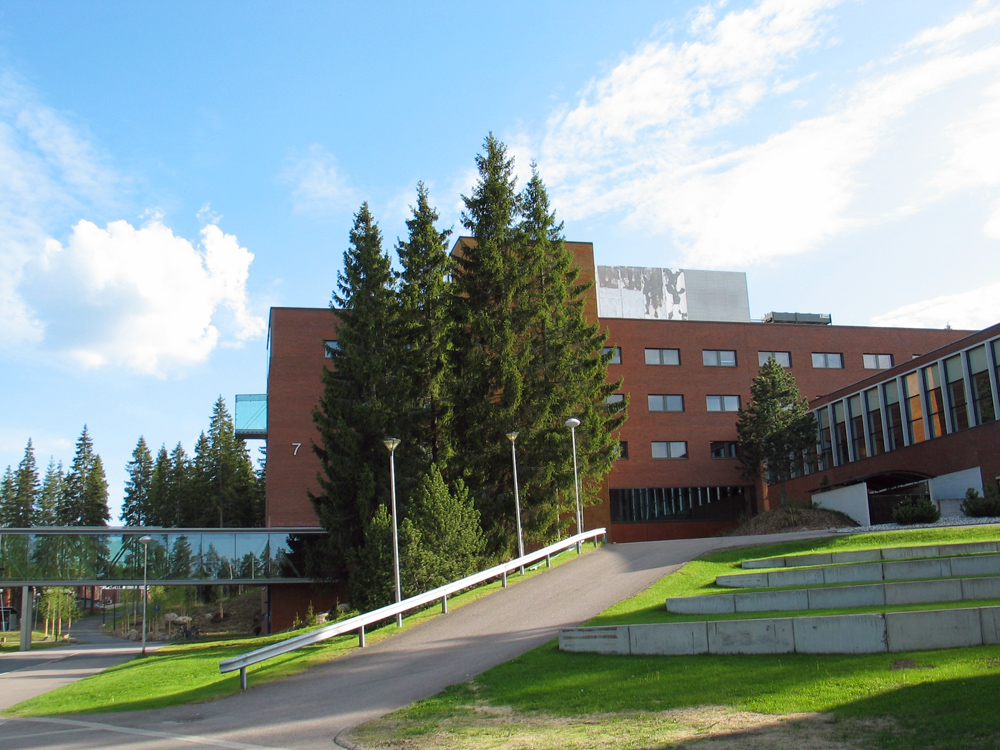
7th wing of the Lappeenranta campus, which includes the academic library

LUT University started permanent operations in Lahti in 1996 in the form of a small research unit. University of Kuopio and University of Joensuu were combined into the University of Eastern Finland in 2010, while LUT stayed independent and kept its Lappeenranta campus as well as its previously added operations in Lahti.

The LUT Universities Group was formed in 2017 when LUT acquired Lahti University of Applied Sciences (LAMK) and Saimaa University of Applied Sciences (SAIMIA). This change came as the Finnish government was looking to reduce the amount of small universities in Finland, and also move the operations of universities of applied sciences under universities. SAIMIA had previously moved from its city center campus to the same campus area as LUT in Lappeenranta, and the fusion of the two universities into one organization was a natural one. LAMK had faced some difficulties in the past, with many critiquing the institution due to its decisions to reduce programs in fields like arts due to budget constraints. Eventually, the decision was made to transfer the organization under LUT. With both LAMK and SAIMIA under LUT's organization, both universities were closed permanently and their operations were moved to the new LAB University of Applied Sciences. LAB took the parts that worked with LAMK and SAIMIA, and created a new fused university of applied science with a stricter focus on education and work. LAB also strengthened the arts departments of LAMK and SAIMIA.

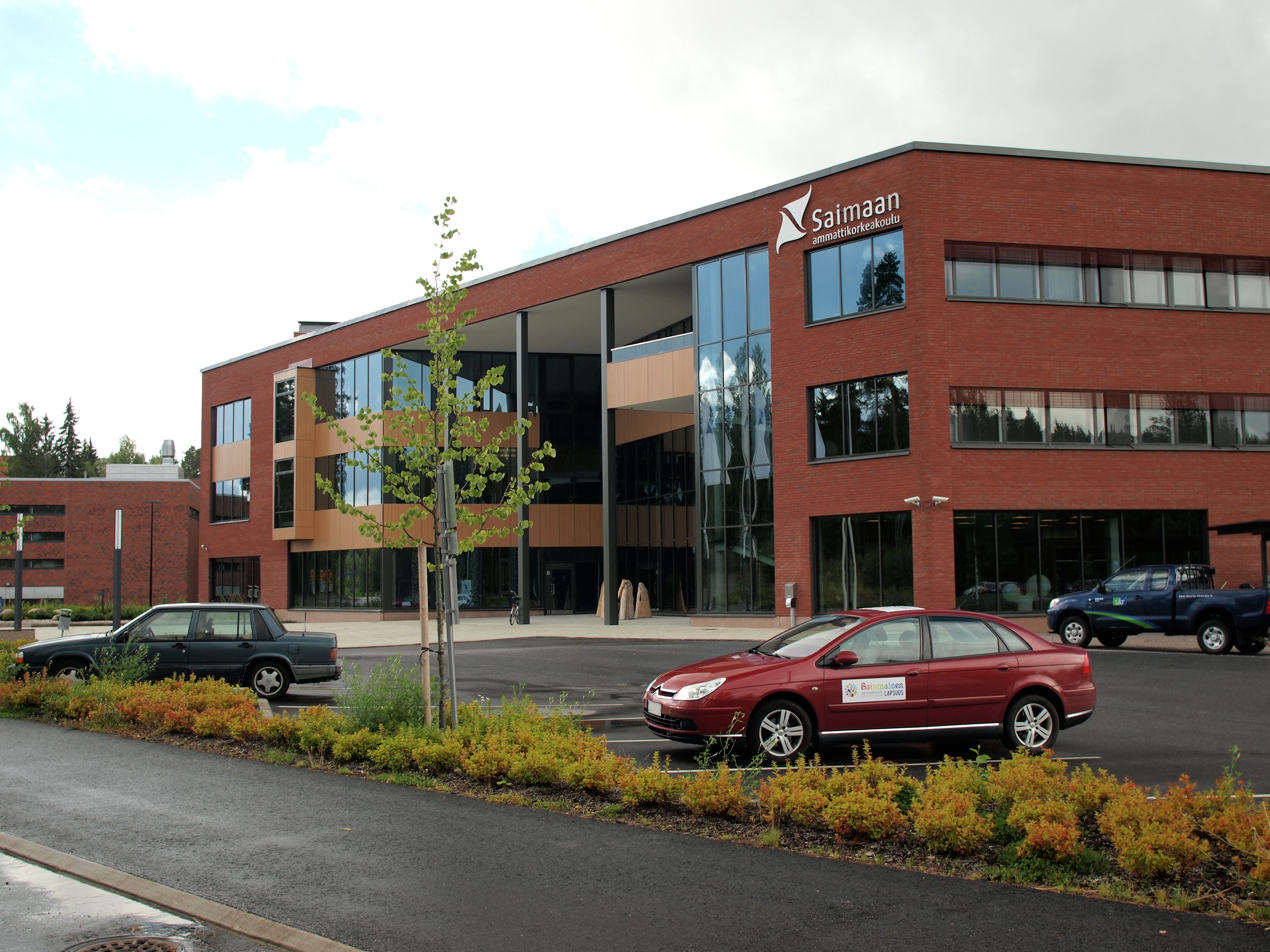
SAIMIA, now LAB Main building in Lappeenranta, connected to LUT via skybridge

After the acquisition of LAMK and the creation of LAB University of Applied Sciences, LUT expanded its reach and opened a second campus. The city of Lahti was a natural choice since the new LUT Universities Group already managed the university of applied science operation in the city, and the city also lacked a full science university despite its large population. In 2019, the new campus was opened and the university requested a change to the Finnish Universities Act to change names from Lappeenranta University of Technology to Lappeenranta-Lahti University of Technology LUT, not only keeping the LUT abbreviation but officially adding it to the full name of the institution. This request was accepted by the Finnish government, and from then on the name LUT was used less as an abbreviation but rather as a descriptive name for the university, leading to the abbreviation name change to LUT University.

LUT University began their first English bachelor's program of Technology and Engineering Science in 2019, allowing students a multidisciplinary opportunity for engineering education in Finland. Later in 2020, the university negotiated a joint contract with Chinese Hebei University of Technology (HEBUT) to offer English based bachelor's programs in both the Lappeenranta and Lahti campuses. In 2023, the university started its first bachelor's programs in social sciences, with master's programs in social sciences and communications sciences starting up in 2024.

== Lappeenranta Campus ==
LUT University's Lappeenranta campus is the original and largest campus of LUT University. The campus is located off from the city center of Lappeenranta in the district of Skinnarila. The campus gives students round-the-clock access to campus resources such as the academic library and gym at all times. The campus also has the Jamie Hyneman Center (JHC), named after LUT University's professor of practice Jamie Hyneman, who is known for the show Mythbusters. Most of LUT University's research and laboratories are located in the Lappeenranta campus.

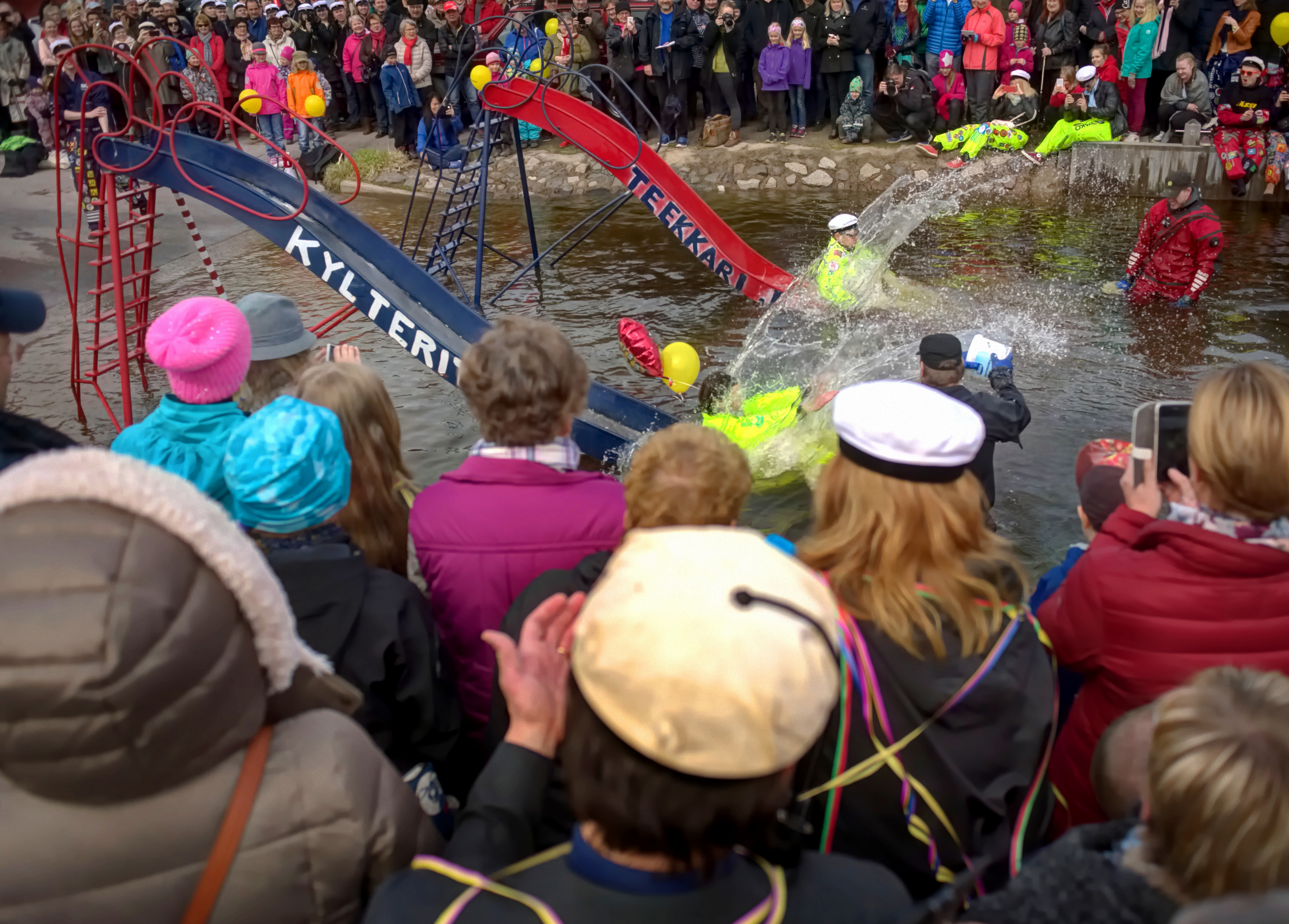
First year students being "baptized" to become second year students

The Lappeenranta campus is connected to the campus of LAB University of Applied Sciences' Lappeenranta campus via a skybridge. LAB students have access to LUT's academic library and other portions of the LUT building, while LUT students have access to LAB spaces such as the sports hall. Overall, the campus houses over 8,500 students among LUT University and LAB University of Applied Sciences, and combined with other experts and companies on campus the campus population exceeds 10,000. There are about 3,500 LAB University of Applied Sciences students and over 5,000 LUT University students studying on the Lappeenranta campus.

Each program at LUT University has their own guild (study/subject organization) and guild room. Incoming students can expect an active student life. The Lappeenranta campus is known for holding the world's longest Vappu, normally a one-day celebration in Finland which in Lappeenranta lasts between three and four weeks each year.

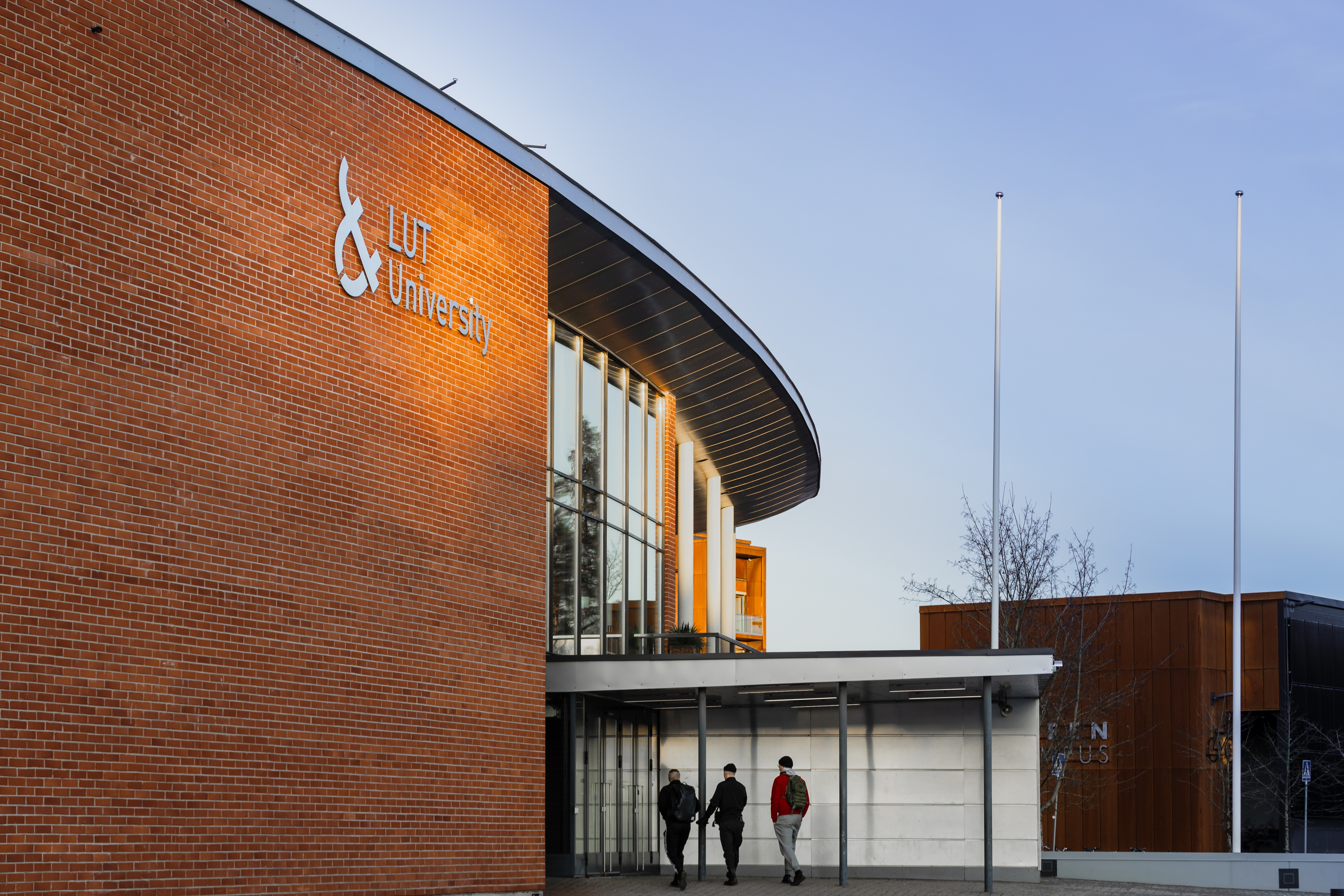
Press photo of the Lappeenranta Campus main doors

Each guild of LUT in Lappeenranta has their own distinctly colored overalls which distinguish them in student events. Overall colors are as follows:

Student overall colors (LUT Lappeenranta)
Subject area and guild name	color
Technology and Engineering Science - Tesseract	Sand
Energy Technology - Armatuuri	White
Computer Science - Cluster	Red
Business - Enklaavi	Neon Yellow
Industrial Engineering and Management - Kaplaaki	Dark Blue
Chemical Engineering - KeTeK	Black
Mechanical Engineering - KRK	Orange
Computational Engineering - Lateksii	Fuchsia
Environmental Engineering - Pelletti	Gray
Electrical Engineering - Sätky	Green
International Exchange - ESN Lappeenranta	Blue
Social and Communications Sciences - Dominus	Sky Blue

It should also be noted that the students from LAB University of Applied Sciences also have their own overall colors and traditions on campus, and that the student clothing tradition is not limited to just LUT students.

Each year, first year students get "baptized" typically in Lake Saimaa, and become first year students. Students get baptized a second time during Vappu to become a "Teekkari" student, meaning a Technology and Engineering Student, "Kylteri" student, meaning business student. Social science students also take part in the tradition.

The Lappeenranta campus has a large variety of restaurants, cafés, and bars. This includes the student union owned YOLO restaurant, and a restaurant operated by Compass Group at the KIELO campus building for companies. Inside the university there is a campus shop, café, buffet, pizza buffet restaurant, and some other restaurants and recreation. There is a restaurant and cafe inside the LAB University of Applied Sciences connected to LUT through a skybridge, and there is also a bar that is near student housing on campus. The student union building also has a grocery store students can use to buy essentials. The Finnish Student Health Service (FSHS/YTHS) also has a health center on campus that students can use which includes but is not limited to dental, physical and mental health support.

== Lahti Campus ==
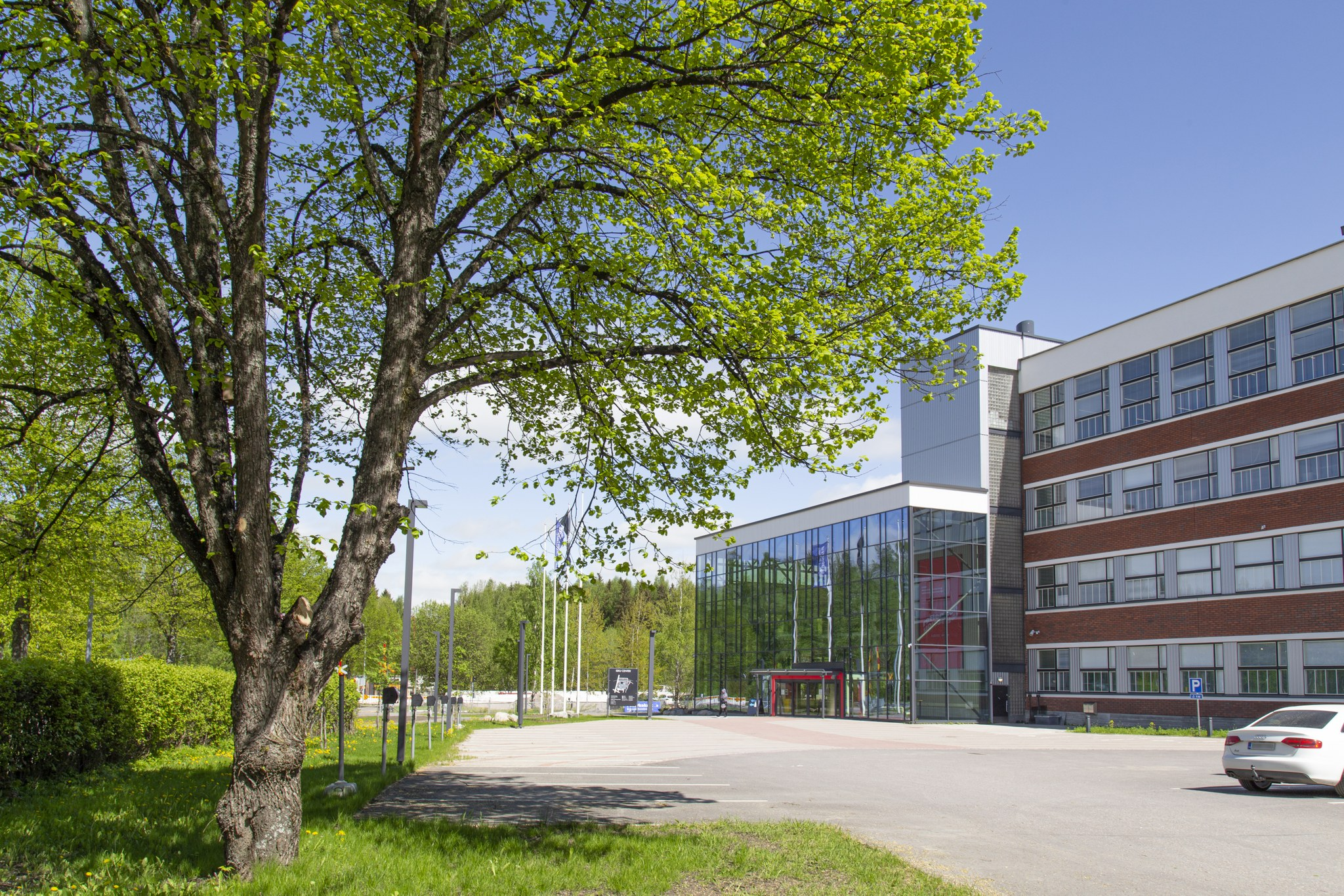
Part of the building that houses the Lahti campus of LUT and LAB

LUT University's second campus is located in the Finnish city of Lahti. The Lahti campus shares a space with LAB University of Applied Sciences' Lahti campus. The campus is located inside a renovated factory, of which a portion belongs to the universities, but is also shared among various companies and institutes. While operations in Lahti were started in 1996, the campus itself is very new. Because of this, the campus is still forming and a variety of features and offerings of the Lappeenranta campus are not yet present in Lahti.

The Lahti campus shares some of the student traditions of guilds and colored student overalls, and has many of the same features to the Lappeenranta campus. The campus has been steadily growing and new programs and features are added consistently. With LAB University of Applied Sciences, the Lahti campus has about 6,000 students, of which about 1,000 are LUT students. About half of LUT University's international bachelor's programs in English are located on the Lahti campus. The campus also has a large amount of Finnish master's programs relating to commercial science and engineering. Because of this, the student population of the Lahti campus largely consists of master's level students.

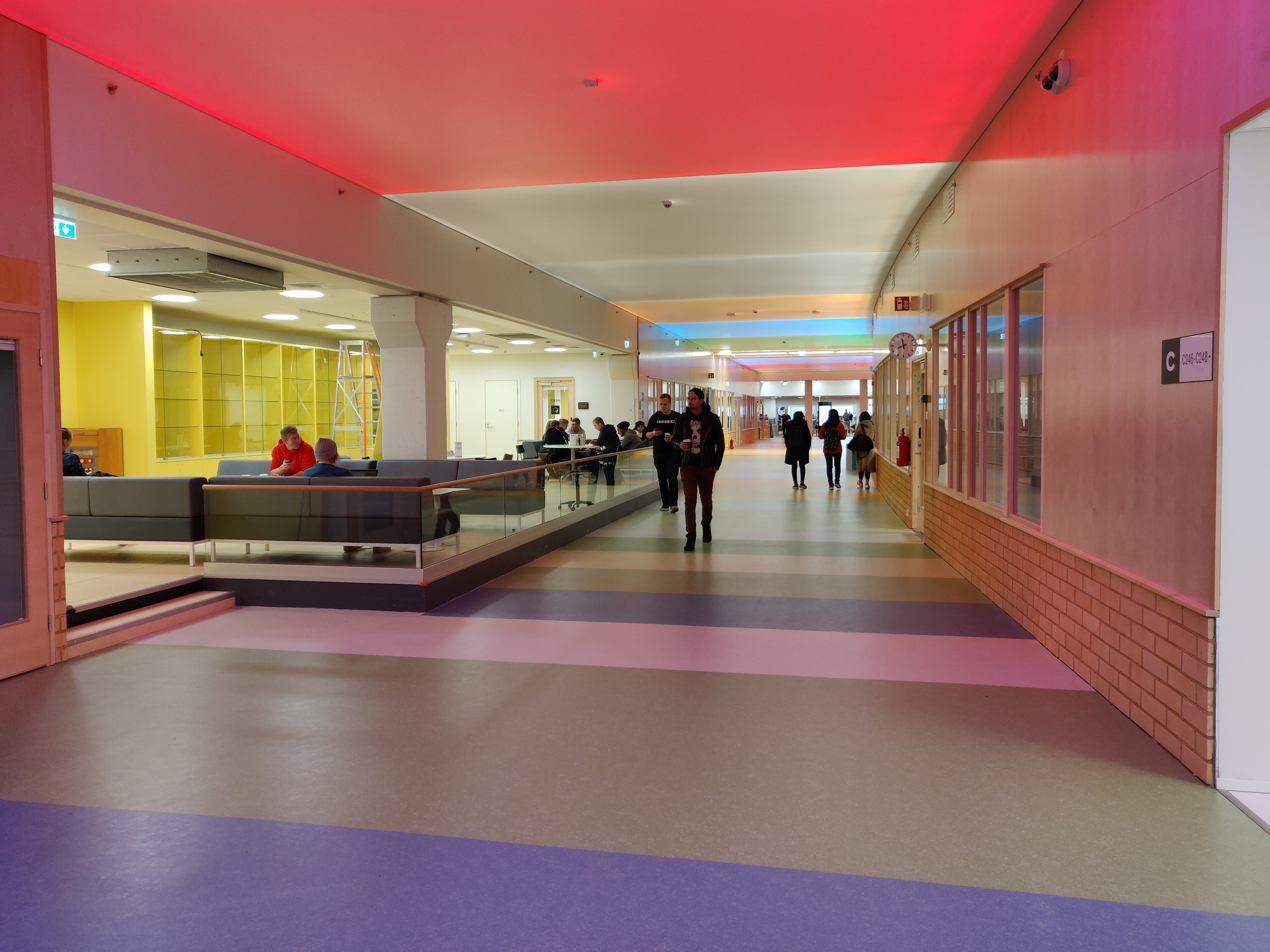
LUT and LAB joint Lahti Campus and its color changing ceiling

The Lahti campus hosts several student guilds, which are responsible for the students on the Lahti campus. LAB University of Applied Sciences also has their own student guilds on campus for their respective fields.

Student overall colors (LUT Lahti)
Subject area and guild name	Color
Energy Technology - Fuusio	Light Purple
Industrial Engineering and Management - Kapital	Blue and Dark Blue
Software Engineering - SoSA	Olive Green

While other universities like the University of Helsinki have had higher education opportunities in Lahti, LUT University and LAB University of Applied Sciences are the currently the only schools of higher education in the area with an extensive list of study subjects, making it a choice for those who want to study and live near the city of Lahti.

The Lahti campus has two restaurants and cafes for students. The campus also has a small section of the university academic library.

== LUT Regional Units and Offices ==
The Mikkeli research unit opened in 2002, and currently has five professors working with groups of research students. The research unit focuses on research and doctoral studies. The current research in Mikkeli centers on climate issues.

The Kouvola research unit has also been operational since 2002, and is focusing on research relating to technology and business, as well as railway logistics. The research unit houses the innovation logistics master's program.

The Brussels regional office exists to strengthen the university's cooperation with its European partners.

== Degrees, Reputations and Rankings ==
LUT awards the following degrees: Bachelor of Science (Economics), Bachelor of Science (Technology), Bachelor of Social Science, Master of Science (Economics), Master of Science (Technology), Master of Social Sciences, Licentiate of Science (Economics), Licentiate of Science (Technology), Doctor of Science (Technology), Doctor of Science (Economics), and Doctor of Philosophy.

LUT University has been ranked in the top 5 Finnish universities in the 2023 QS Top 500 universities list, and is in the top 3% of universities globally. The university is ranked second in Finland in the fields of Physical Sciences and Business and fifth in Engineering.

LUT has been ranked as one of the world's 20 most rapidly developing challenger universities and was also ranked as the 9th best university for climate action. The university has further been ranked in the Times Higher Education's Top 20 world's best small universities list.

In the year 2024, LUT University received 6,601 domestic applicants, and accepted 591 new students. This puts LUT University's overall domestic acceptance rate for the year 2024 at 11%. However, some fields are more popular and difficult to be accepted into than others. The field of business itself accounts for roughly 50% (3,069) of the overall applications to the university despite only having 140 starting spots. At the same time, the fields in engineering tend to have a much less drastic application-to-spot ratio.

== Organisation ==
=== Board ===
- Chairman Teresa Kemppi-Vasama, Chairman of Kemppi Oy
- Pia Erkinheimo Director, Finnish Climate Fund
- Kimmo Rauma, Vice President, Danfoss Power Solutions, Electrics
- Olli Rehn Governor and chairman of the board, Bank of Finland
- Liisa Rohweder, Secretary General, WWF Finland
- Juhani Hyvärinen, Professor, LUT
- Ahti Jaatinen-Värri, Associate Professor, LUT
- Paavo Ritala, Professor, LUT
- Henna Raekorpi, Business student, LUT

=== Rectors ===
- Rector D.Sc. (B.A.) Juha-Matti Saksa
- Vice Rector (Research) Jari Hämäläinen, PhD, Professor
- Vice Rector (Education) Jaana Sandström D.Sc. (Tech.), Professor

== Schools and Departments ==
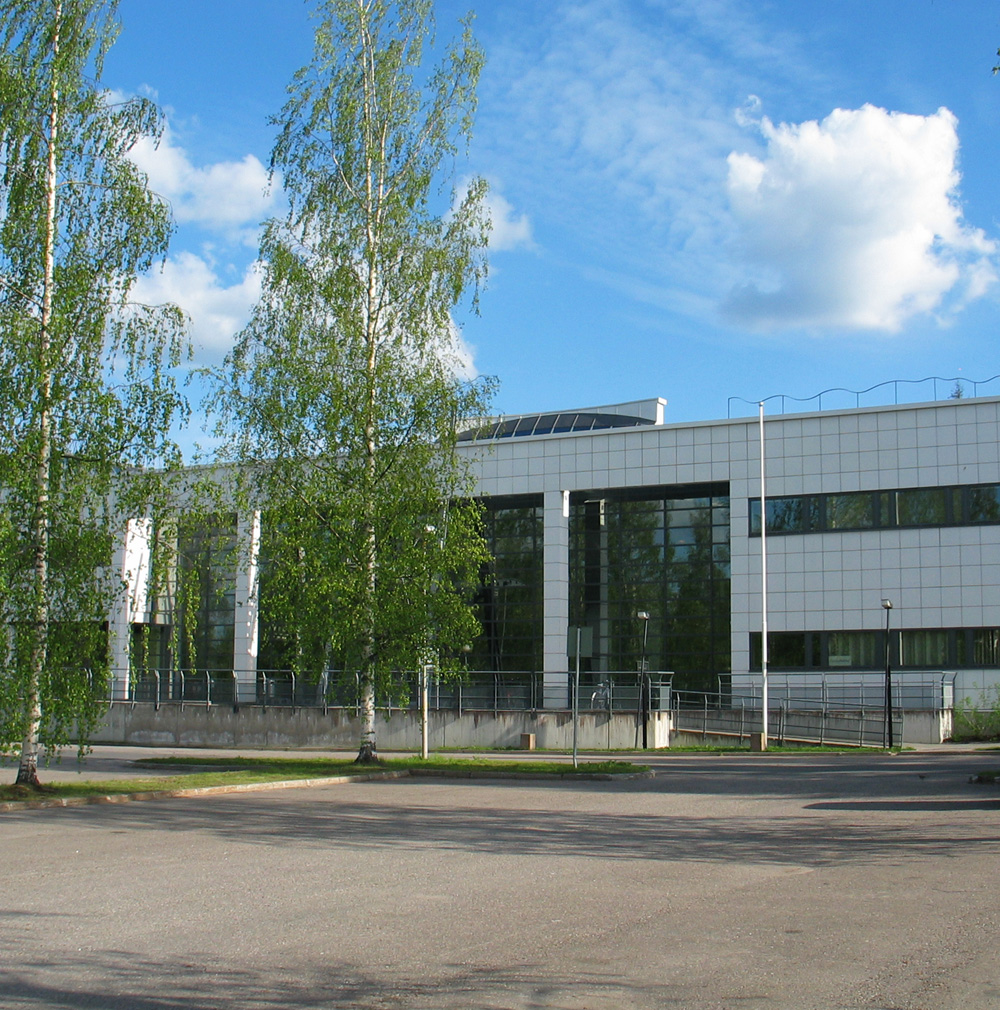
LUT Student Union Building

At the beginning of 2015, the university shifted to an organization model which does not have traditional faculties and departments. Instead, the university consists of three distinct schools which focus on the following research topics:

=== LUT School of Energy Systems (LES) ===
- Energy Technology
- Electrical Engineering
- Sustainability Science
- Mechanical Engineering

=== LUT School of Engineering Science (LENS) ===
- Chemical Engineering
- Computational Engineering and Physics
- Industrial Engineering and Management
- Software Engineering and Digital Transformation

=== LUT Business School (LBS) ===
- Strategy, Management and Accounting
- International Business, Marketing and Entrepreneurship
- Business Analytics and Data Science

== Fields of Study ==
The following fields can be studied at LUT University to a bachelor's, master's, licentiate and doctoral level depending on program:

- Chemical Engineering
- Computational Engineering
- Electrical Engineering
- Energy Technology
- Environmental Technology
- Industrial Engineering and Management
- Mechanical Engineering
- Software Engineering
- Business
- Social Sciences

== Research Institutes ==
- Centre for Separation Technology (CST)
- Carelian Drives and Motor Centre (CDMC)
- Centre of Computational Engineering and Integrated Design (CEID)

== The Viipuri Prize ==
The Viipuri Prize, established by the Society for Viipuri School of Economics, is awarded for particularly noteworthy achievements in their respective fields. The Prize is given out every few years to a scholar who is prominent in their of study on a global scale, and whose work significantly impacts the research agenda at LUT Business School.

The following scholars have been awarded the Viipuri Prize:

- David Teece, University of California, Berkeley (2003)
- James G. March, Stanford University (2004)
- Peter Buckley, University of Leeds (2006)
- Sidney G. Winter, University of Pennsylvania (2008)
- C. K. Prahalad, University of Michigan (2010)
- John Kay, London School of Economics (2012)
- Constance E. Helfat, Tuck School of Business (2014)
- Rebecca M. Henderson, Harvard Business School (2017)
- Erik Brynjolfsson, Massachusetts Institute of Technology (2019)
- Henry Chesbrough, University of California Berkeley (2022)

== Rectors ==
- Viljo Immonen, 1969 – 1970
- Erkki Kinnunen, 1971 – 1975
- Niilo Teeri, 1975 – 1977
- Juhani Jaakkola
- Markku Lukka, 1998 – 2008
- Ilkka Pöyhönen, 2008 – 2014
- Anneli Pauli, 2014 – 2016
- Juha-Matti Saksa, 2016 - present

== See also ==
- LAB University of Applied Sciences
- Hebei University of Technology
- List of universities in Finland
