= Rautjärvi =

- Municipality
- Rautjärven kunta Rautjärvi kommun
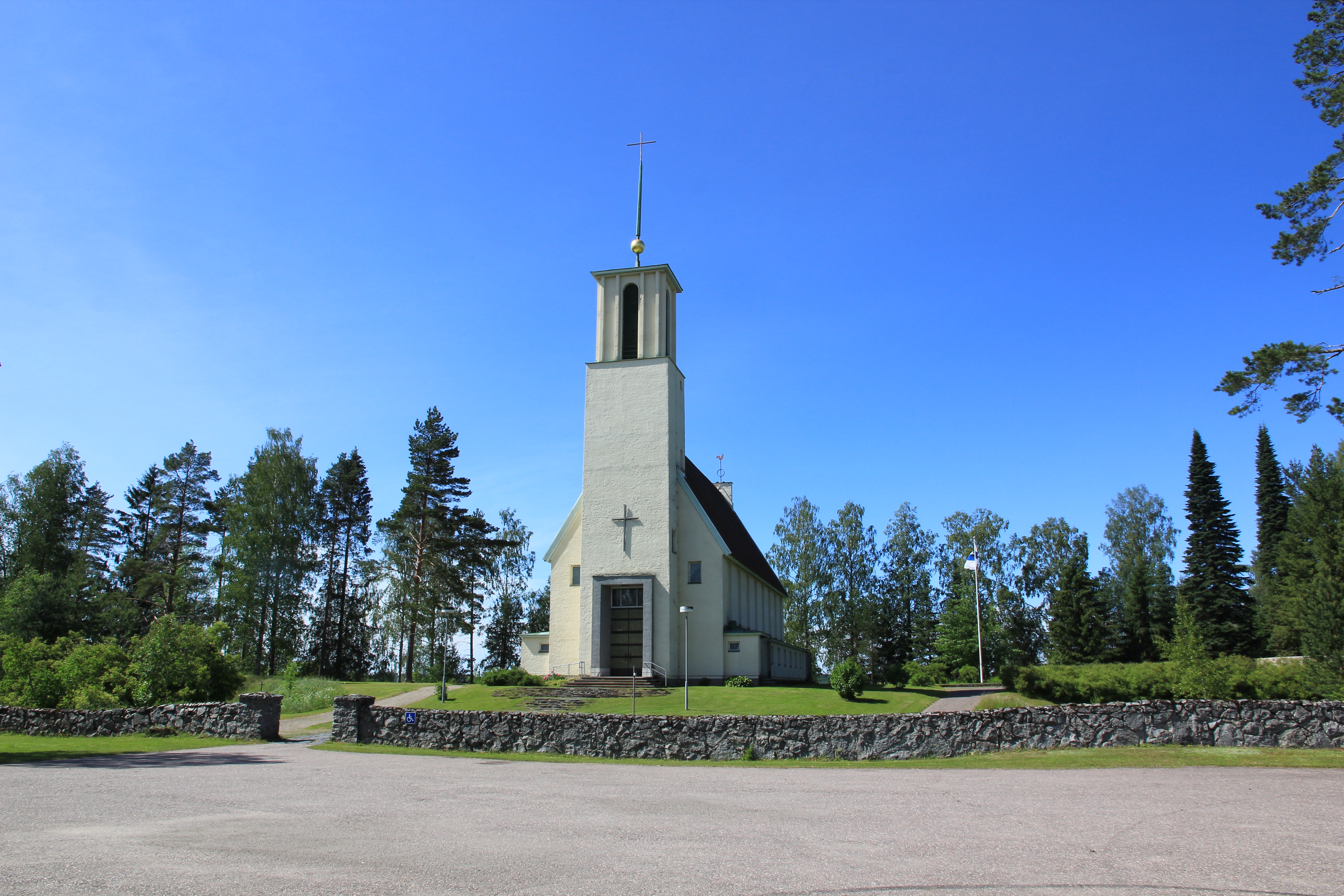
- Simpele church in Rautjärvi

- Coat of arms

- Location of Rautjärvi in Finland
- Interactive map of Rautjärvi
- Coordinates: 61°26′N 029°21′E
- Country: Finland
- Region: South Karelia
- Sub-region: Imatra
- Charter: 1871
- Seat: Simpele

Government
  - Municipal manager: Harri Anttila

Area (2018-01-01)
  - Total: 401.89 km^{2} (155.17 sq mi)
  - Land: 351.47 km^{2} (135.70 sq mi)
  - Water: 50.25 km^{2} (19.40 sq mi)
  - Rank: 219th largest in Finland

Population (2025-12-31)
  - Total: 2,888
  - Rank: 213th largest in Finland
  - Density: 8.22/km^{2} (21.3/sq mi)

Population by native language
  - Finnish: 95.1% (official)
  - Others: 4.9%

Population by age
  - 0 to 14: 9.1%
  - 15 to 64: 50.8%
  - 65 or older: 40.1%
- Time zone: UTC+02:00 (EET)
  - Summer (DST): UTC+03:00 (EEST)
- Website: www.rautjarvi.fi

Rautjärvi (Finnish pronunciation: [ˈrɑu̯tˌjærʋi]) is a municipality in the South Karelia region of Finland. The municipality has a population of 2,888 (31 December 2025) and covers an area of 401.89 square kilometres (155.17 sq mi) of which 50.25 km^{2} (19.40 sq mi) is water. The population density is 8.22 inhabitants per square kilometre (21.3/sq mi). More than half of Rautjärvi's residents live in Simpele, the administrative center of the municipality.

The neighboring municipalities of Rautjärvi are Parikkala and Ruokolahti, while to the east is the Russian border. The municipality is unilingually Finnish. Rautjärvi is mostly well known as the birthplace of legendary sniper Simo Häyhä, a hero of the Winter War of World War II.

== History ==
Rautjärvi was first mentioned in 1560 as Rauda Järffui as one of the villages of Jääski. It became a part of the Ruokolahti parish after its establishment in 1572. The municipality of Rautjärvi was founded in the year of 1861. A few years prior in 1859, the Rautjärvi parish had founded an independent church.

After the Winter War ended with the signing of the Moscow Peace Treaty on March 12, 1940, almost half of Rautjärvi (198.9 km^{2}) was handed over to the Soviet Union in accordance with the treaty.

The municipality of Simpele was consolidated with Rautjärvi in 1973, becoming its new administrative center.

Rautjärvi Church, a wooden church completed in 1881, was destroyed in a fire on Christmas 2022. The fire broke out in the middle of the worship, but all 30 people in the building got out safely.

== Villages ==
The villages of Rautjärvi are inclusive of: Haakanala, Hallilanmäki, Hiivaniemi, Hinkkala, Hynnilä, Ilmee, Jurvala, Kalpiala, Kekäleniemi, Kokkola, Kopsala, Korjola, Korpijärvi, Lankila, Latvajärvi, Miettilä, Niskapietilä, Partila, Pirhola, Purnujärvi, Rautjärvi, Siisiälä, Simpele, Torsansalo, Uimola, Untamo, Viimola, Vähikkälä.

== Attractions ==
- Hiitolanjoki, a river that descends from Lake Ladoga
- Haukkavuori, the highest place in South Karelia
- Iivanansaari, an island which also serves as the burial place of Jussi Reinikainen
- Pirunkirkko, several rock and stone formations
- Laiko
- Miettilä Historical Reserve Garrison, historic barracks which were constructed in the years of 1881–1883.
- Rautjärvi local history exhibition
- Kollaa Museum, a museum which documents the Battle of Kollaa
- Niskapietiläntie, a road connecting the villages of Rautjärvi and Miettilä
- Rautjärvi church, completed in the year of 1881
- Simpele church, completed in the year of 1933

== Notable individuals ==
- Hannes Pulkkinen, elementary school teacher and a Member of the Parliament of Finland
- Jesse Joronen, professional footballer who plays as a goalkeeper for Serie B club Palermo.
- Johannes Häyhä, teacher and writer
- Jorma Kosunen, Finnish Border Guard colonel and former Frontier school (later the Border and Coast Guard Academy) leader
- Jouni Vento, ice hockey player
- Karl Henrik Jakob Ignatius, priest and writer
- Lauri Vilkko, Olympic pentathlete
- Lea Piltti, opera singer
- Martti Siisiäinen, professor and researcher
- Matti Mononen, pole vaulter
- Olli Pajari, Member of the Parliament
- Simo Häyhä, notable hero of the Winter War of World War II.
- Yrjö Roiha, missionary
