= Oskari Reinikainen =

Finnish politician (1885–1969)

Oskari Brynolf Reinikainen
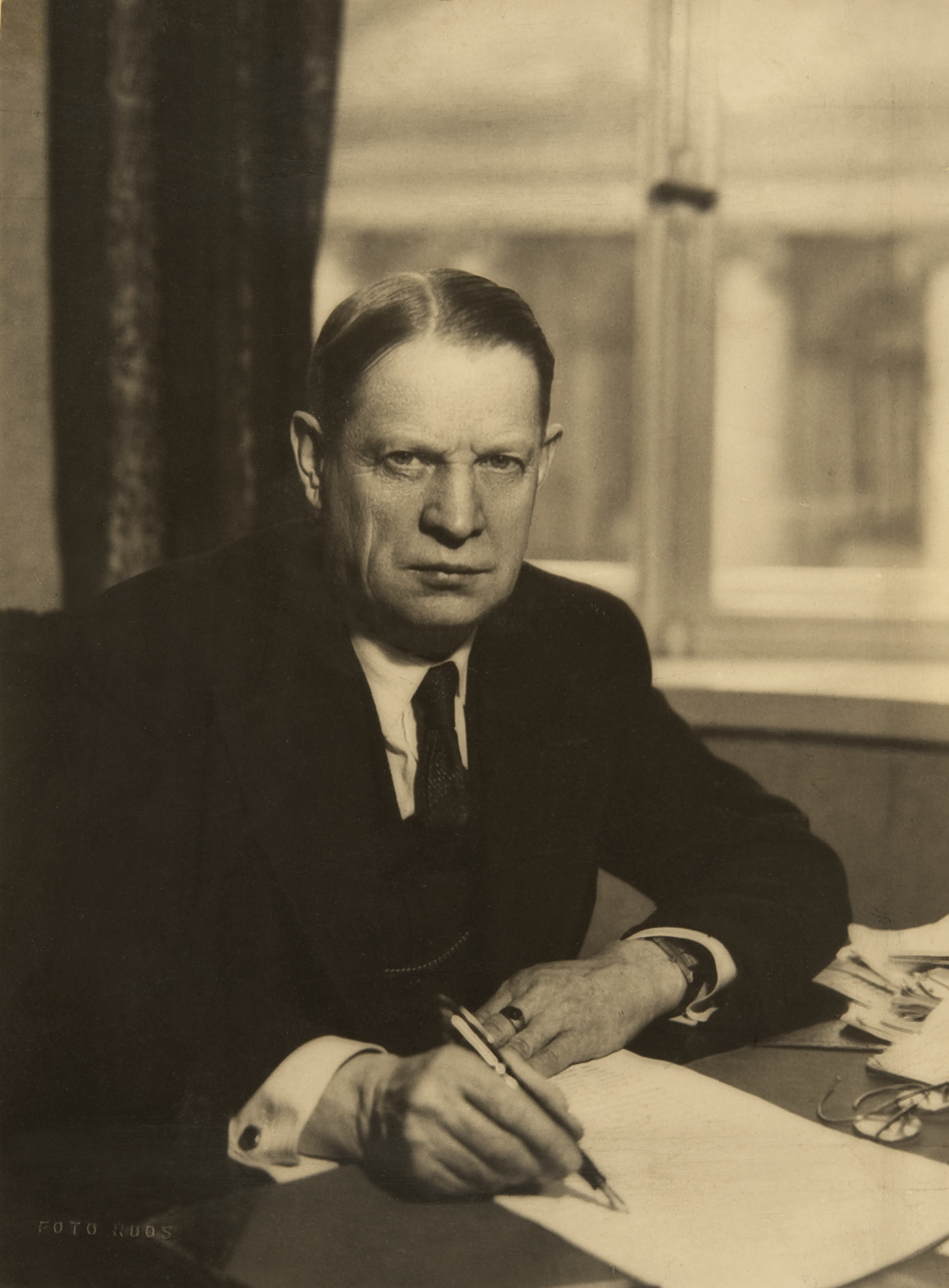
- Oskari Reinikainen in the early 1940s
- In office 1919–1945

Personal details
- Born: December 1, 1885
- Died: November 12, 1969 (aged 83)
- Party: Social Democratic Party of Finland

Oskari Brynolf Reinikainen (1 December 1885, Parikkala – 12 November 1969) was a Finnish physician and politician. He served as Deputy Minister of Social Affairs from 12 March 1937 to 1 December 1939. Reinikainen was a Member of the Parliament of Finland from 1919 to 1945, representing the Social Democratic Party of Finland (SDP).
