= Hjalmar Dahl =

Swedish-speaking Finnish journalist, translator and author (born 1891)

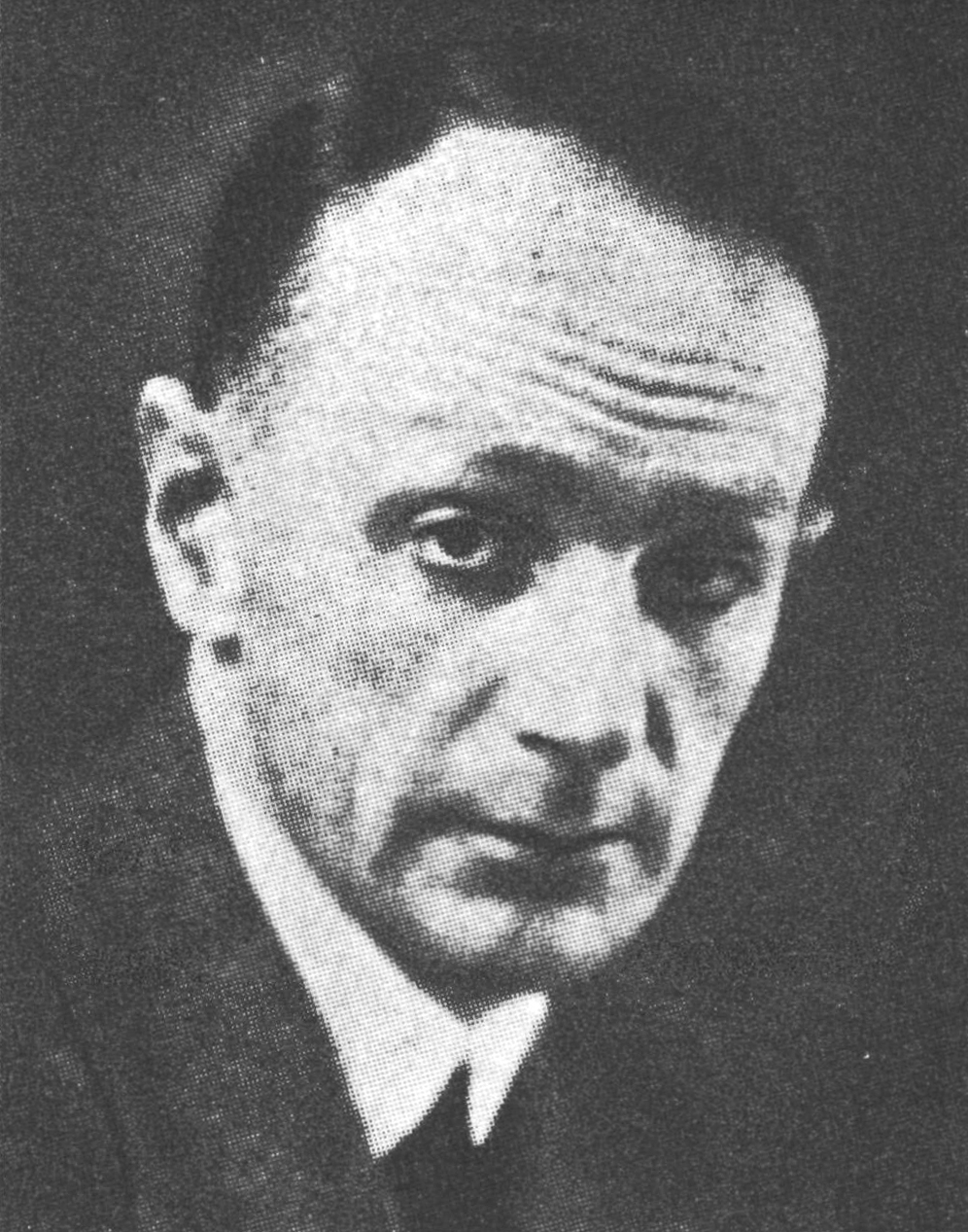
- Born: Hjalmar Karl Emil Dahl; 15 May 1891; Parikkala, Grand Duchy of Finland, Russia
- Died: 19 October 1960 (aged 69); Porvoo, Finland
- Occupations: Writer; translator; journalist
- Writing career
- Language: Swedish

Hjalmar Karl Emil Dahl (15 May 1891 – 19 October 1960) was a Swedish-speaking Finnish journalist, translator and author.

== Biography ==
Hjalmar Dahl was born in Parikkala to pharmacist Johan Dahl (1861–1908) and Betty Kiljander (1865–1927). After graduating in Helsinki in 1910, he moved to the University of Lausanne, where he graduated in 1913. After returning to Finland, he began his almost 30-year career as a journalist in the Russian-language department of Hufvudstadsbladet, in addition to which he was editor-in-chief of Nya Tidningen from 1922 to 1925. He was also the editor-in-chief of Helsingfors-Journalen from 1929 to 1944, the editor of Månads-Revyn from 1940 to 1944 and the editor-in-chief of Aftonposten from 1944 to 1945.

His debut work was Erik Åmark's Anxieties (1931).

Dahl was the executive director of the Artists' Association of Finland from 1923 to 1926, and from 1945 Dahl was a freelance writer. Dahl translated many Russian literary classics as well as works by F. E. Sillanpää into Swedish.

From 1955, Dahl lived in Porvoo, where he died on October 19, 1960. He was buried in Näsinmäki Cemetery.

== Bibliography ==
- Erik Åmarks oro. Schildts, 1931
- Uppbrott. Schildts, 1932
- Herrarna till Kaukola. Schildts, 1941
- Store dvärgen. Schildts, 1946
- Helsingfors – det havsomflutna. Schildts, 1949
- Finlands svenskar : upplagsverk. Söderström, 1956
