= Simpelejärvi =

Lake in South Karelia region, Finland

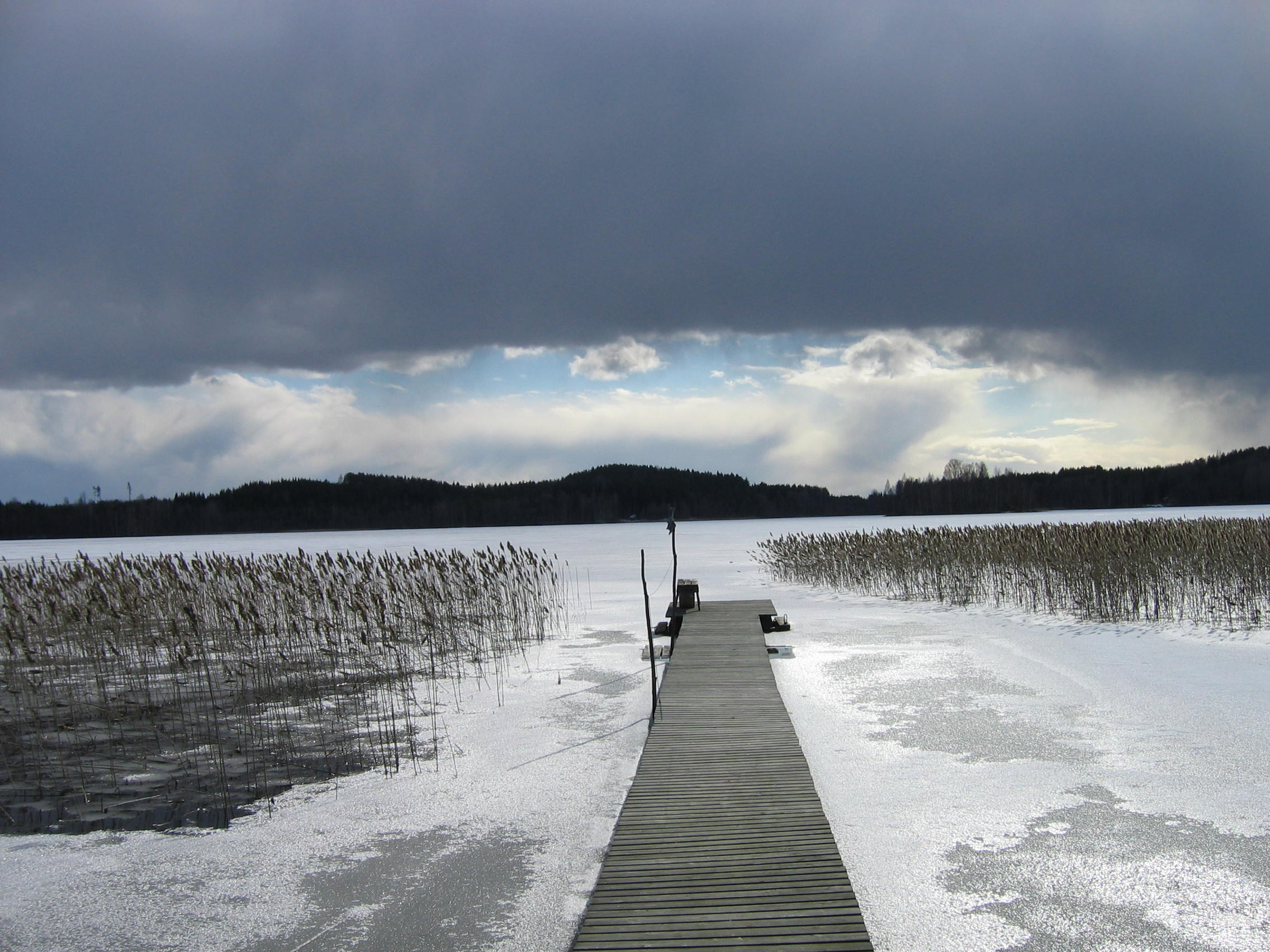
- A frozen Lake Simpelejärvi

- Location within Finland
- Location: Parikkala municipality, South Karelia Region
- Coordinates: 61°30′N 29°25′E
- Catchment area: fi:Hiitolanjoki
- Basin countries: Finland
- Surface area: 88.205 km^{2} (34.056 sq mi)
- Max. depth: 34.4 m (113 ft)
- Shore length^{1}: 208.588 km (129.611 mi)
- Surface elevation: 68.8 m (226 ft)
- Frozen: December–April
- Islands: Viitasaari, Iso Kontiosaari
- Settlements: Parikkala, Särkisalmi
- ^{1} Shore length is not a well-defined measure.

Simpelejärvi is a medium-sized lake in the Parikkala municipality in South Karelia region in Finland.

== See also ==
- List of lakes in Finland
