= 1991 Taipalsaari APC sinking =

Fatal military accident in Finland

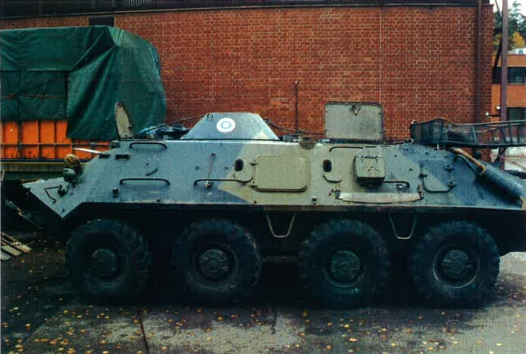
- The vehicle in question, after being recovered from the lake
- Date: 14 June 1991
- Time: 20:05 (EEST)
- Location: Taipalsaari, Finland; 61.28805°N 28.08152°E
- Type: Sinking of amphibious vehicle during military exercise
- Organised by: Finnish Army
- Deaths: 7
- Property damage: 1 x APC (hull loss)

In 1991, a Finnish Army-operated armoured personnel carrier (APC) sank in Lake Saimaa in Taipalsaari, south-eastern Finland, during an amphibious water crossing, resulting in the deaths of seven conscripts in one of the worst peacetime accidents of the Finnish Defence Forces.

== Background ==
In June 1991, a military exercise was held in the Taipalsaari training range, attended by conscripts and personnel from the Karelia Brigade and Savo Brigade, as well as trainees from the NCO college Maanpuolustusopisto.

As a highlight of the week-long exercise, two jäger units would simulate a waterborne attack using Soviet-made BTR-60 APCs to cross a 4 kilometres (2.5 mi) stretch of Lake Saimaa. A third unit would have made the same crossing earlier and taken up defensive positions on the opposite shore, attempting to fight off the two attacking units.

The BTR-60 is fully amphibious, and therefore capable of operating in water as well as on dry land. The specific version used at the time by the Finnish Army is the BTR-60 BP, which has a cargo stowage rack fitted on top of the vehicle at the rear.

The weather that evening was ideal: sunny with clear skies, plenty of daylight remaining, and no wind; the surface of the lake was completely still, and visibility was excellent. It was later speculated that this might have lulled the participants into a false sense of security, which may have indirectly contributed to the events.

Earlier that day, all the APCs had been inspected and tested with trial runs on the lake. A test sailing along the planned route had also been carried out, to ensure it was free of obstacles.

== Incident ==
The two attacking units were ordered to cross the Mäntysaarenselkä expanse from west to east, along two separate routes of 3.5 kilometres (2.2 mi) and 4.5 kilometres (2.8 mi) waterborne distance respectively. One of the units was made up of conscripts from the Savo Brigade, and was to follow the shorter route; the other, with conscripts from the Karelia Brigade, took the longer route. The accident vehicle was part of the latter unit.

As soon as the manoeuvre got underway, one of the APCs developed an electrical fault, and was withdrawn from the exercise, with its crew and passengers transferred to another vehicle. As a result, that vehicle was more heavily laden than originally intended, with a total of 14 people on board. Of them, seven were travelling inside the vehicle, with the other seven riding on top, three of which were seated on the cargo rack at the rear.

The accident vehicle was the first to enter the water at 19:45, followed by the other vehicles of that formation, with all six afloat by 19:50. After some ten minutes in the water, the lead vehicle's oil temperature was found to be high, and the driver requested permission to open the ventilation grilles which had been closed for the water crossing; this was done twice in the space of a few minutes. Around the same time it was noticed that water had accumulated on the floor of the passenger compartment, and the bilge pump was operated to clear this.

Approximately twenty minutes and 2.5 kilometres (1.6 mi) into the crossing, at 20:05, a sudden hissing sound was heard from the engine bay at the rear, with steam emitting and water trickling into the passenger compartment. The rear of the vehicle was beginning to sink, so the vehicle commander ordered immediate evacuation. However, before anyone inside the vehicle managed to get out, the APC sank in a matter of seconds, with all seven people inside. Those sitting on top of the vehicle said afterwards that everything happened so fast they had no time to react; one moment they were sitting on top of the vehicle, and a few seconds later the vehicle had vanished and they were floating in the lake.

The accident location was c. 300 metres (1,000 ft) from the nearest shore. The water depth was 32 metres (100 ft), and the lake bottom there was of thick, soft mud. The APC at first sank by the stern, but turned upside down before coming to a rest on the bottom of the lake. The only way for the passengers inside the vehicle to get out was by way of the exit hatches on the roof, but as the vehicle was resting on its roof in the mud, such exit was impossible.

It was initially thought that only four people were missing, but it was confirmed later that night that all those travelling inside the vehicle had died. Emergency services attended the scene, and underwater sonar searches were carried out to locate the vehicle, but as the accident spot had not been marked it took six hours before the vehicle was finally found using divers with underwater video cameras and other specialist search equipment.

On the morning of 16 June, the vehicle was towed ashore, and four of the victims were discovered inside. Two more bodies were found nearby shortly afterwards, with the final one discovered elsewhere in the lake some two weeks later. All were determined to have died by drowning. The deceased were all aged in their early twenties.

== Causes ==
A team of military investigators began immediately looking into the causes of the accident, and carried on working for five days, after which they handed the case over to a major incident investigations panel, whose final report was published in the spring of 1992.

Several factors were found to have contributed to the accident. Due to the heavy load, the vehicle swam deeper than normal, which resulted in it taking on more water than usual. Especially the discharge outlet of the bilge pump, located towards the rear of the vehicle, was vulnerable to water ingress due to a design fault and the vehicle's low position in the water.

Water gathered in the footwell of the passenger compartment, being the lowest point of the vehicle, but as that was covered by raised floor boards, the presence of water there was not obvious to the passengers. It was estimated that at the time of the accident there was 450 litres (100 imp gal; 120 US gal) of water in the footwell, partly due to the insufficient operation of the bilge pump.

As the vehicle took on water, it accumulated mostly in the middle or rear sections, and thus the vehicle began gradually going down by the stern. This was further exacerbated by the deck passengers seated on the rear-mounted cargo rack: the rack's maximum load capacity was 100 kilograms (220 lb), which the three passengers exceeded considerably. This rear-heaviness eventually led to the open engine cooling vents at the back being submerged, causing water to suddenly rush into the engine bay.

The accident vehicle's seasonal engine cooling setting had almost certainly not been switched to the 'summer' position, which would have caused the engine to overheat, in turn necessitating the opening of the ventilation grilles, thus allowing water to enter the vehicle.

The command structure of the officers onboard was unclear, and their seating positions on top of the vehicle were non-standard, which may have contributed to the vehicle's stability in the water.

It was also found that the conscript crew's training was mostly focused on operation on land, with only limited time dedicated to waterborne operation and safety protocol. There were also discrepancies in the safety norms, for example one set of specifications allowed 15 people with their combat gear on board, while another limited the capacity to 13 during waterborne operations.

== Aftermath ==
The incident received extensive media coverage in Finland, and stirred the public consciousness.

A military funeral was held for the conscripts in the Valkeala church on 5 July, attended by the then Minister of Defence Elisabeth Rehn and the Chief of Defence, Admiral Jan Klenberg, as well as thousands of mourners.

In 2021, on the 30th anniversary of the accident, a memorial was held on location.

The case went to court, with four officers and the corporal in charge of the accident vehicle being charged with involuntary manslaughter (kuolemantuottamus). After two lower court and two Supreme Court hearings between 1992 and 1995, the accused were eventually cleared of the manslaughter charges. However, the Supreme Court later fined three of the officers for service conduct offences on the basis that they had failed to intervene to correct errors in the loading of the accident vehicle.

The Finnish Defence Forces were later criticised for focusing only on factual investigation of the accident, and not offering post-incident crisis support to those involved in or otherwise affected by the events. As a result of the accident, some years later the FDF did however mandate a crisis support unit to be established in each military base and unit.
