= Parikkala =

- Municipality
- Parikkalan kunta Parikkala kommun
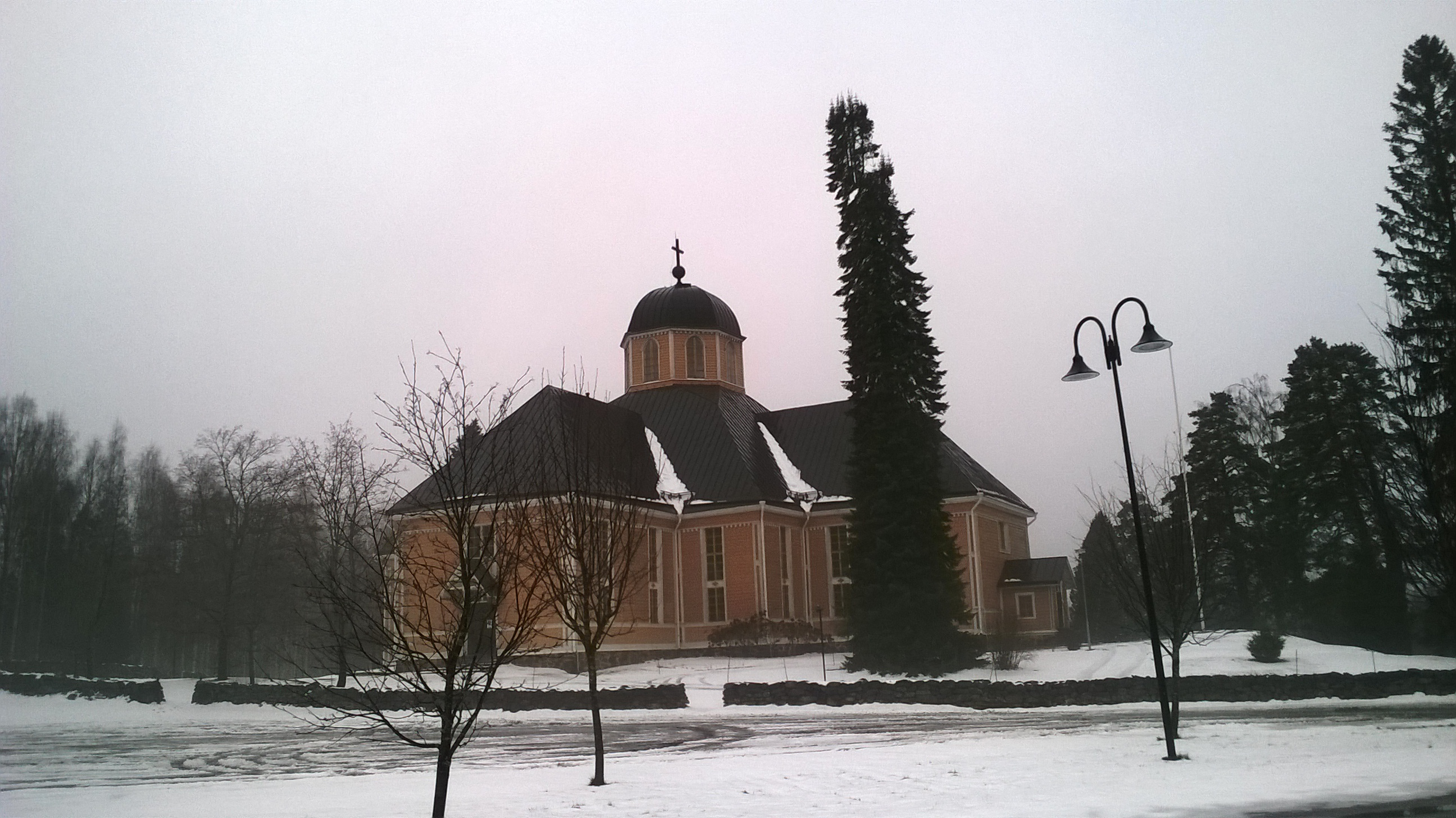
- Church of Parikkala

- Coat of arms

- Location of Parikkala in Finland
- Interactive map of Parikkala
- Coordinates: 61°33′N 029°30′E
- Country: Finland
- Region: South Karelia
- Sub-region: Imatra
- Charter: 1635

Government
  - Municipality manager: Mervi Pääkkö

Area (2018-01-01)
  - Total: 760.71 km^{2} (293.71 sq mi)
  - Land: 591.91 km^{2} (228.54 sq mi)
  - Water: 167.78 km^{2} (64.78 sq mi)
  - Rank: 141st largest in Finland

Population (2025-12-31)
  - Total: 4,235
  - Rank: 185th largest in Finland
  - Density: 7.15/km^{2} (18.5/sq mi)

Population by native language
  - Finnish: 96.9% (official)
  - Others: 3.1%

Population by age
  - 0 to 14: 10.2%
  - 15 to 64: 49.1%
  - 65 or older: 40.8%
- Time zone: UTC+02:00 (EET)
  - Summer (DST): UTC+03:00 (EEST)
- Climate: Dfc
- Website: parikkala.fi

Parikkala (Finnish pronunciation: [ˈpɑrikːɑlɑ]) is a municipality of Finland located in the province of Southern Finland and is part of the South Karelia region, 97 kilometres (60 mi) from Lappeenranta and 139 kilometres (86 mi) from Joensuu. The town center of Parikkala is about 10 kilometres (6.2 mi) from the Russian border. The municipality has a population of 4,235 (31 December 2025) and covers an area of 760.71 square kilometres (293.71 sq mi) of which 167.78 km^{2} (64.78 sq mi) is water. The population density is 7.15 inhabitants per square kilometre (18.5/sq mi).

Parikkala is located around Simpelejärvi lake and it is a part of a countryside rich with hills and chains of ridges. The municipality is unilingually Finnish. The neighboring municipalities of Parikkala are Kitee, Rautjärvi, Ruokolahti and Savonlinna.

== History ==
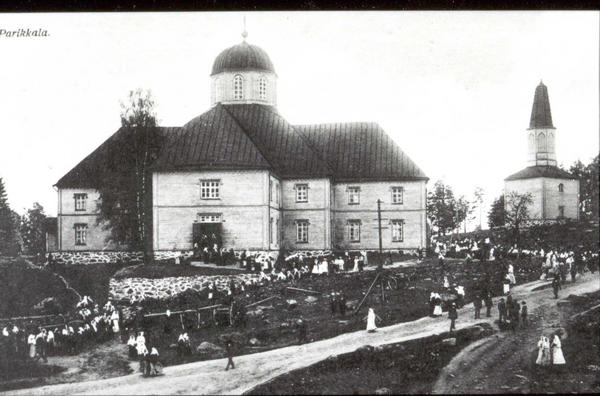
Lutheran church of Parikkala early 20th century

Settlements and artifacts dated to the Stone Age and Bronze Age have been found in Parikkala. A permanent settlement was established around the 15th century.

Many demarcations had a significant impact to Parikkala's development from the Treaty of Nöteborg on August 12, 1323, to peace treaties signed in 1947 with the Soviet Union; for example, in the Treaty of Nystad from 1721, which in practice defined roughly Finland's current border with Russia, Parikkala remained the only current Finnish municipality on the Russian side before the formation of the Grand Duchy of Finland. After World War II, one third (199.3 km^{2}) of Parikkala's area was handed over to the Soviet Union. The Orthodox Church has been very influential in this area since the Middle Ages. Later, Parikkala has become known for its many dairies. Parikkala became independent in 1617.

In 2004, three municipalities (Parikkala, Saari and Uukuniemi) merged to form one municipality called Parikkala.

== Education ==
A comprehensive school, one of the first rural schools in Karelia of Ladoga, was founded in 1907. In 1910 the first three-class school building was built; later it expanded to include a gymnasium, hall and kitchen. A grand piano was provided in the hall, and Finnish artists Toivo Kuula and Oskar Merikanto held their concerts there when visiting Parikkala. Upper secondary school started in the year 1940 and the first class graduated in 1943. The largest number of pupils was in the 1950s, when over 500 pupils attended school there.

== Traveling and routes ==
Parikkala is located on the main railway line from Helsinki to Joensuu. A railway station is located in the middle of Parikkala village center. Traveling time is about three and half hours from Helsinki, and all passenger trains stop at Parikkala. The city of Imatra is about 60 km south of Parikkala.

=== Attractions ===
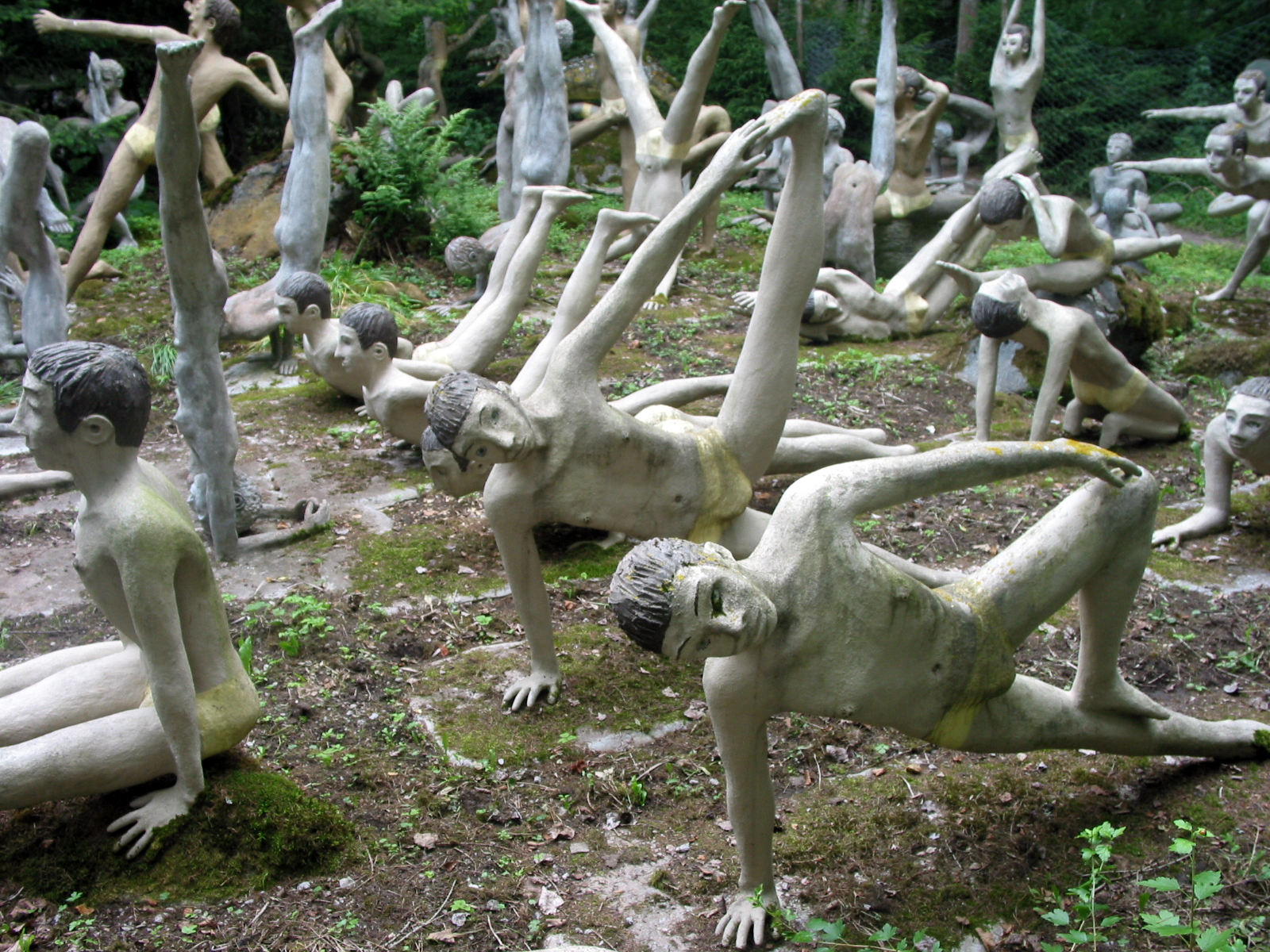
The sculpture park in Parikkala

One of Parikkala's most famous attractions is the park of more than 500 sculptures worked by Veijo Rönkkönen, located along the Highway 6. This sculpture park has been called one of the "most terrifying places on Earth".

== Notable people ==
- Hjalmar Dahl (1891–1960), journalist, translator and writer
- Pietari Hannikainen (1813–1899), writer, journalist and surveyor
- Sirpa Pietikäinen (born 1959), politician
- Aimo Pulkkinen (1928–2018), footballer
- Arto Räty (born 1955), lieutenant general
- Oskari Reinikainen (1885–1969), physician and politician
- Hannu Siitonen (born 1949), javelin thrower
- Lisa Sounio (born 1970), CEO and chairperson of Dopplr

== See also ==
- Niukkala – village in Parikkala
