= Taipalsaari =

- Municipality
- Taipalsaaren kunta Taipalsaari kommun
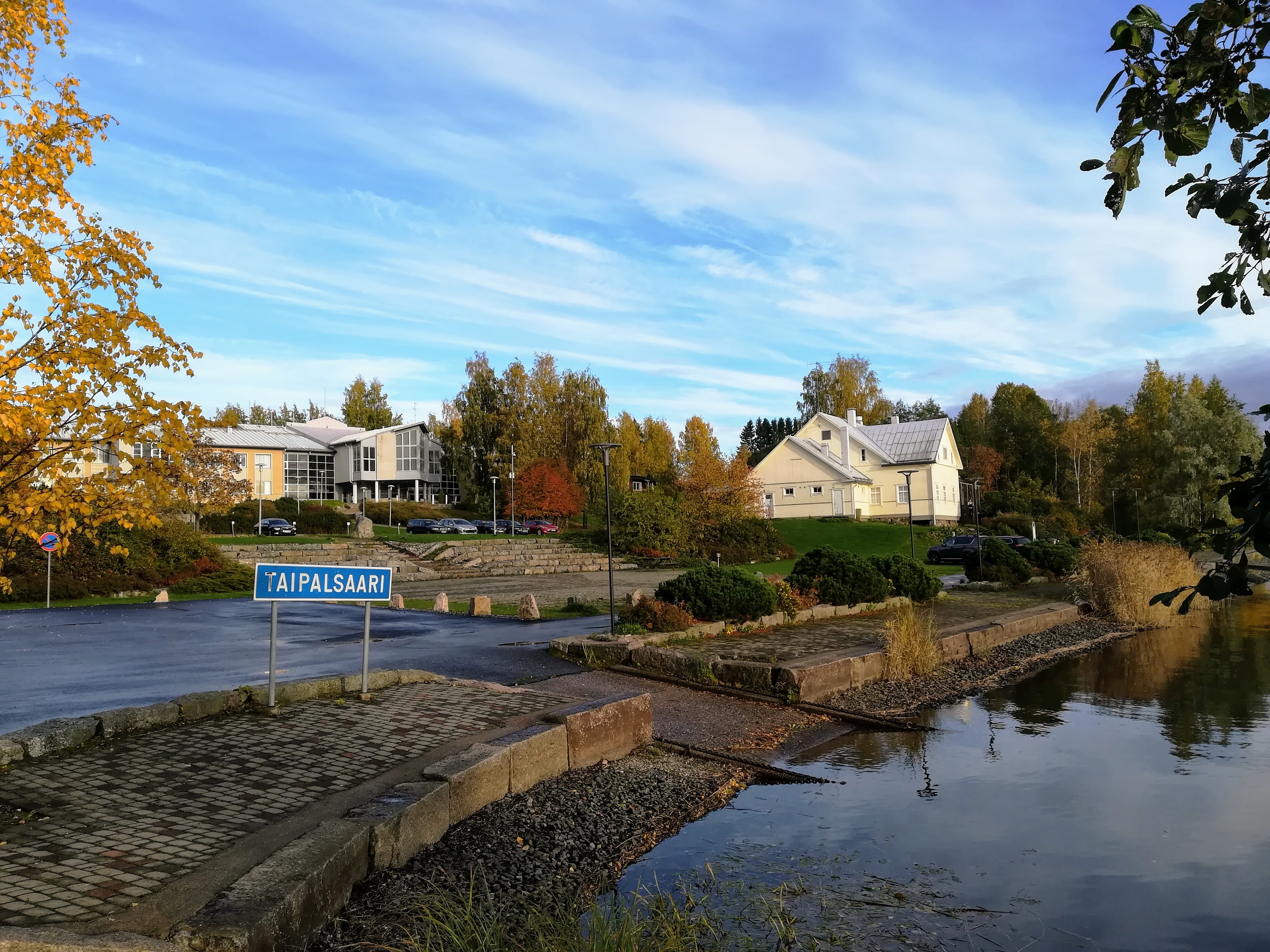
- Taipalsaari in October 2017

- Coat of arms

- Location of Taipalsaari in Finland
- Interactive map of Taipalsaari
- Coordinates: 61°09.5′N 028°04′E
- Country: Finland
- Region: South Karelia
- Sub-region: Lappeenranta sub-region
- Charter: 1571

Government
  - Municipal manager: Kari kuuramaa

Area (2018-01-01)
  - Total: 761.94 km^{2} (294.19 sq mi)
  - Land: 344.69 km^{2} (133.09 sq mi)
  - Water: 416.88 km^{2} (160.96 sq mi)
  - Rank: 224th largest in Finland

Population (2025-12-31)
  - Total: 4,574
  - Rank: 177th largest in Finland
  - Density: 13.27/km^{2} (34.4/sq mi)

Population by native language
  - Finnish: 93.4% (official)
  - Others: 6.6%

Population by age
  - 0 to 14: 15%
  - 15 to 64: 58.6%
  - 65 or older: 26.4%
- Time zone: UTC+02:00 (EET)
  - Summer (DST): UTC+03:00 (EEST)
- Climate: Dfc
- Website: www.taipalsaari.fi/en

Taipalsaari is a municipality of Finland. It is located in the province of Southern Finland and is part of the South Karelia region. The municipality has a population of 4,574 (31 December 2025) and covers an area of 761.94 square kilometres (294.19 sq mi) of which 416.88 km^{2} (160.96 sq mi) is water. The population density is 13.27 inhabitants per square kilometre (34.4/sq mi). Neighbouring municipalities are Lappeenranta, Lemi, Puumala, Ruokolahti and Savitaipale. The municipality is unilingually Finnish.

The church of Taipalsaari was built on 1754 and therefore it is the oldest of still standing church buildings in South Karelia region.

The average temperature during the summer months on Taipalsaari is the highest among Finnish municipalities.

One of the worst peacetime military accidents happened in Taipalsaari in 1991, when an armoured personnel carrier sank in Lake Saimaa.
