= Saimaa University of Applied Sciences =

Former institute of higher education in Finland

- Saimaan ammattikorkeakoulu
- Type: University of applied sciences (polytechnic)
- Rector: Merja Heino
- Students: 3000
- Location: Lappeenranta, South Karelia, Finland
- Website: www.saimia.fi

Saimaa University of Applied Sciences (Finnish: Saimaan ammattikorkeakoulu) was a university of applied sciences in the region of South Karelia, Finland.

Before 2009, it was known as South Karelia University of Applied Sciences (Etelä-Karjalan ammattikorkeakoulu). Its campuses located in Lappeenranta. Saimaa University of Applied Sciences had had campus in Imatra, but it closed, and all the functions were moved to Lappeenranta.

In January 2020, Lahti University of Applied Sciences and Saimaa University of Applied Sciences merged, establishing the new LAB University of Applied Sciences.
