= Ruokolahti =

Ruokolahti Ruokolax
- Municipality
- Ruokolahden kunta Ruokolax kommun
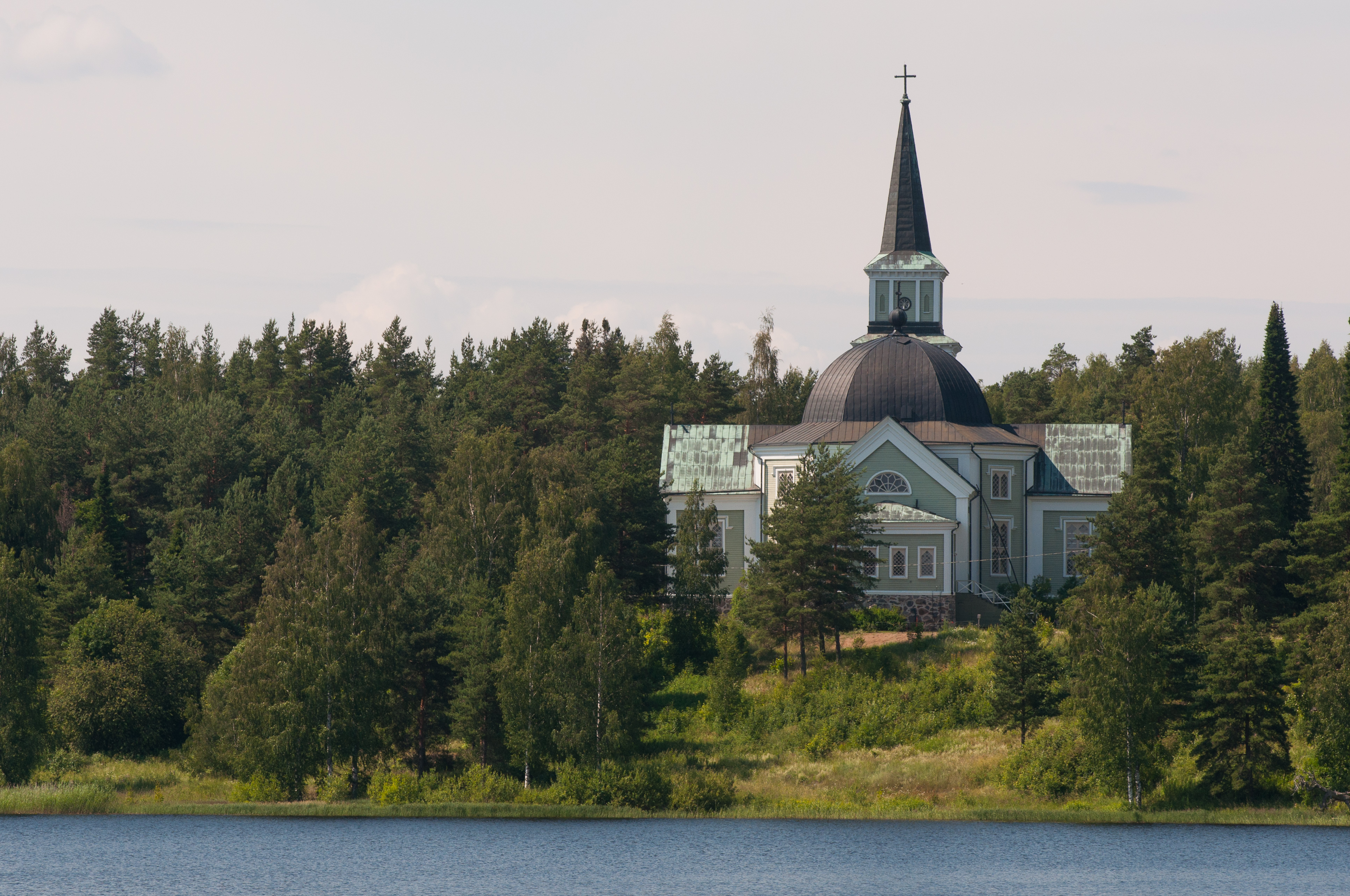
- Church in Ruokolahti

- Coat of arms

- Location of Ruokolahti in Finland
- Interactive map of Ruokolahti
- Coordinates: 61°17.5′N 028°49′E
- Country: Finland
- Region: South Karelia
- Sub-region: Imatra
- Charter: 1868

Government
  - Municipal manager: Jukka-Pekka Bergman

Area (2018-01-01)
  - Total: 1,219.85 km^{2} (470.99 sq mi)
  - Land: 942.09 km^{2} (363.74 sq mi)
  - Water: 276.4 km^{2} (106.7 sq mi)
  - Rank: 81st largest in Finland

Population (2025-12-31)
  - Total: 4,679
  - Rank: 171st largest in Finland
  - Density: 4.97/km^{2} (12.9/sq mi)

Population by native language
  - Finnish: 95.4% (official)
  - Swedish: 0.2%
  - Others: 4.4%

Population by age
  - 0 to 14: 12.2%
  - 15 to 64: 52.7%
  - 65 or older: 35.1%
- Time zone: UTC+02:00 (EET)
  - Summer (DST): UTC+03:00 (EEST)
- Climate: Dfc
- Website: www.ruokolahti.fi

Ruokolahti (Finnish: [ˈruo̯koˌlɑhti]; Swedish: Ruokolax; literally translated the "Reed Bay") is a municipality of Finland, situated in south-eastern Finland, in the region of South Karelia. Neighbouring municipalities are Imatra, Lappeenranta, Taipalsaari, Puumala, Sulkava, Punkaharju, Parikkala and Rautjärvi. Ruokolahti covers an area of 1,219.85 square kilometres (470.99 sq mi) of which 23% is water.

The municipality has 4,679 inhabitants (31 December 2025), but the population doubles in summer as holidaymakers occupy the 3,000 summer cottages in the region.

Ruokolahti is known for its natural environment, for example Kummakivi is a balancing rock located at 61° 29' 36.4596" N, 28° 25' 45.5016" E in Ruokolahti and is protected. In the west there is the Lake Saimaa and in the east there are hundreds of smaller lakes. The Salpausselkä ridges run through the area. In 2025, The Times highlights the Huuhanranta beach on the shores of Lake Saimaa among the attractions of Ruokolahti, referring it as the "Saimaa Riviera".

The famous sniper Simo Häyhä, also known by the nickname "the White Death", lived in Ruokolahti for 57 years after the 1939–40 Winter War. He is buried there in the graveyard of Ruokolahti Church.

The municipal coat of arms of Ruokolahti is a canting arms that directly refers to the name of the municipality, including reeds appearing in it. Wave line is usually used to describe a local body of water. The coat of arms was designed by Gustaf von Numers and was confirmed for use on September 11, 1951.

== Gallery ==
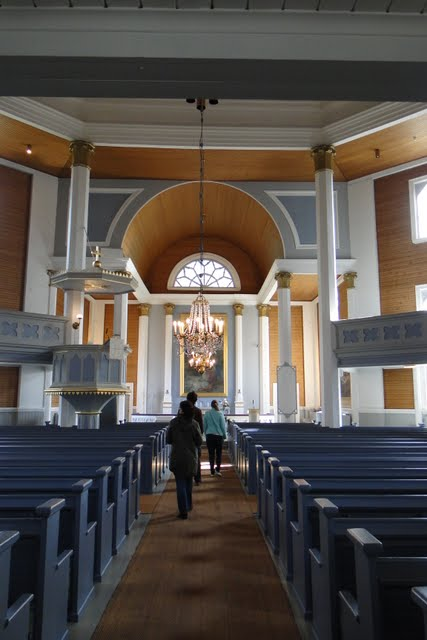

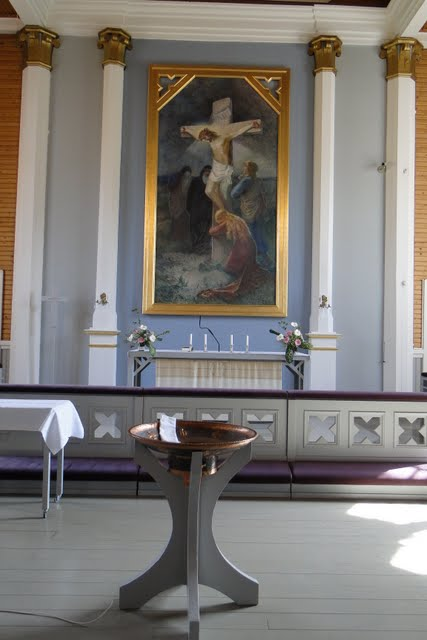

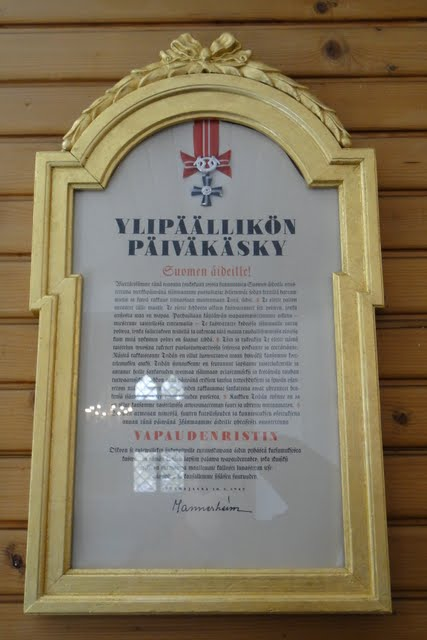
Document donated to the Church
by Marshal C. G. E. Mannerheim

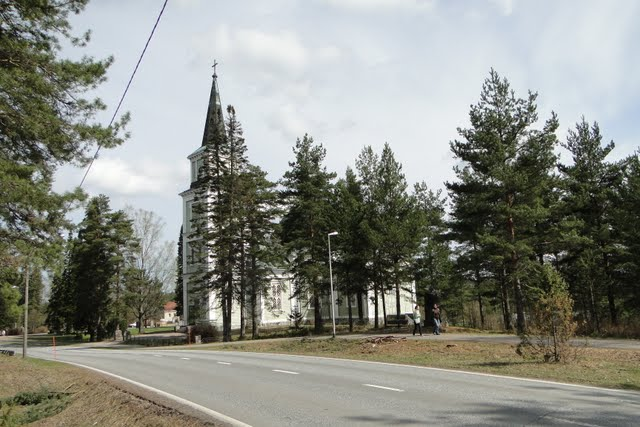

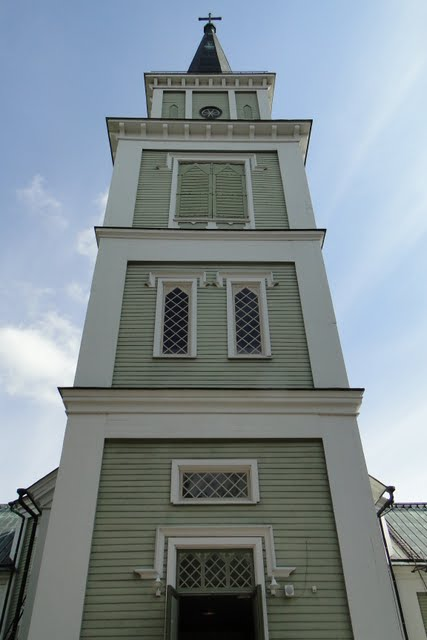

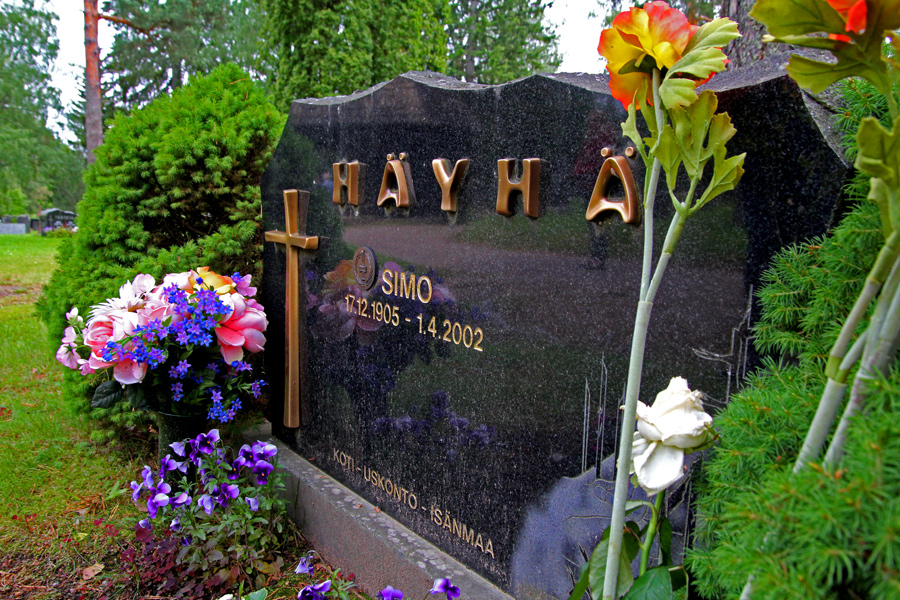
The grave of Simo Häyhä
