= South Karelia =

Region of Finland

South Karelia Etelä-Karjala (Finnish) Södra Karelen (Swedish)
- Region
- Region of South Karelia; Etelä-Karjalan maakunta Landskapet Södra Karelen
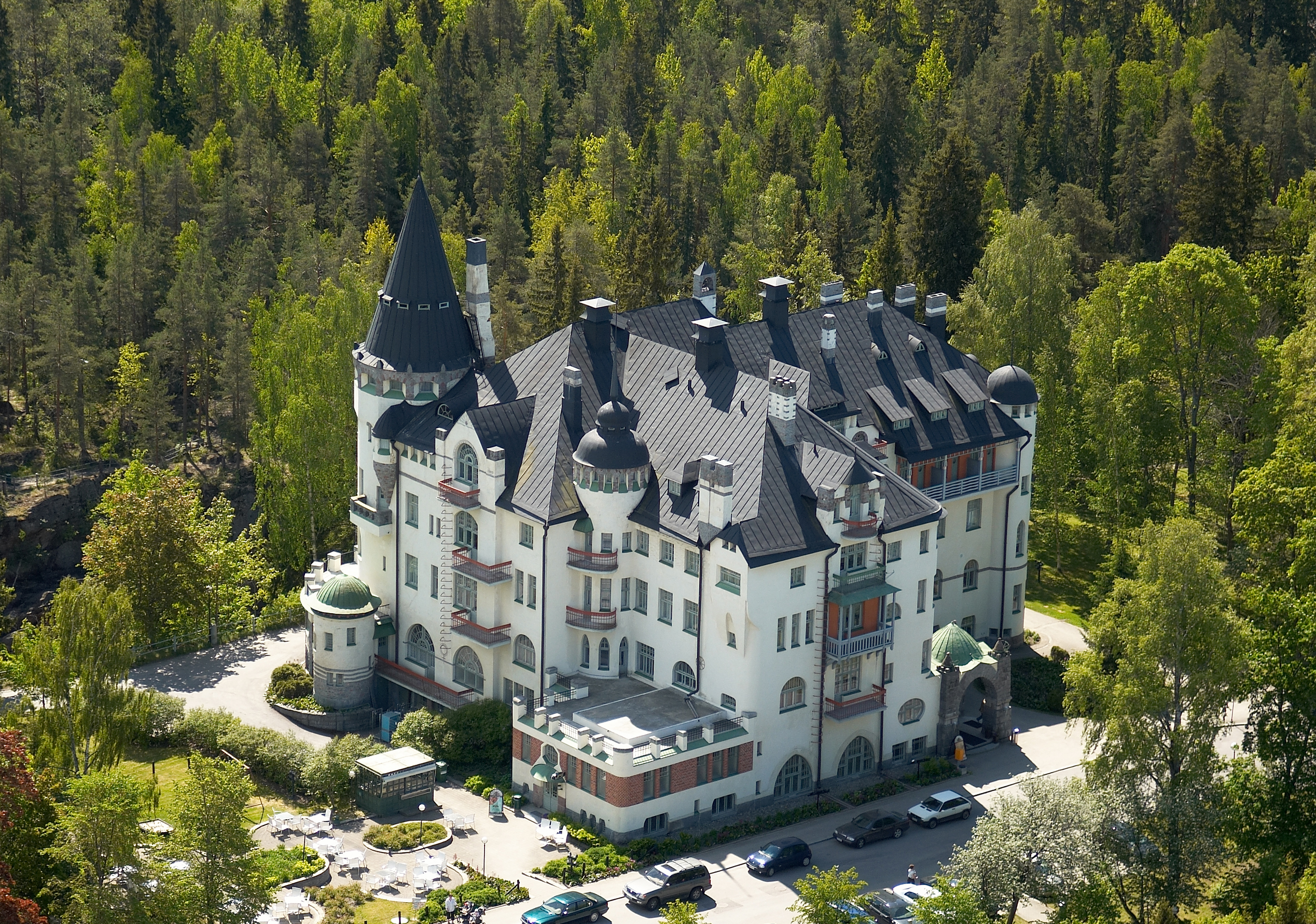
- Aerial photograph of Imatran Valtionhotelli ("Imatra State Hotel") in Imatra

- Coat of arms

- South Karelia on a map of Finland
- Coordinates: 61°N 28°E
- Country: Finland
- Historical province: Karelia
- Capital: Lappeenranta
- Other town: Imatra

Government
  - Regional Mayor: Satu Sikanen

Area
  - Total: 6,873 km^{2} (2,654 sq mi)

Population (2023)
  - Total: 125,190
  - Density: 18.21/km^{2} (47.18/sq mi)
- ISO 3166 code: FI-02
- NUTS: FI187
- Regional bird: Thrush nightingale
- Regional fish: Lake salmon
- Regional flower: Spring pasque flower
- Regional stone: Spectrolite
- Regional lake: Lake Saimaa
- Website: Etelä-Karjala

South Karelia (or Southern Karelia, Finnish: Etelä-Karjala; Swedish: Södra Karelen) is a region of Finland. It borders the regions of Kymenlaakso, South Savo and North Karelia, as well as Russia (Republic of Karelia and Leningrad Oblast).

== Historical province ==
For history, geography and culture see: Finnish Karelia

== Heraldry ==
The coat of arms of South Karelia is composed of the arms of Karelia.

== Nature ==
The ground in the region consists of loose soil types accumulated on top of bedrock during the last ice age, as the ice sheet retreated to the northwest. The soil shaped by the Ice Age is still clearly visible in the South Karelian environment and scenery. The greatest natural wonder in South Karelia consists of the parallel dividers called Salpausselkä, which transect the region, and their large edge formations. At its steepest, the divider plunges into Lake Saimaa in Kyläniemi village of Taipalsaari.

The variable terrain and great local height differences make South Karelia exceptional in Southern Finland. As a contrast to the rugged rocky islands of Saimaa and flat pinewoods, the region features lush deciduous woodlands reaching out from the Ladogian Karelia around Parikkala, Imatra and Lappeenranta. Parikkala and Rautjärvi are clearly different from other areas in the region, with the Ladogian Karelia even affecting their climate. The lush deciduous zone with great biodiversity shelters the most valuable wetlands of Finland. Bird wetland habitats of national importance are found in Siikalahti and Tarassiinlahti of Parikkala and Kuokkalampi in Ruokolahti. These wetlands harbour endangered habitats – birds, dragonflies, bats and butterflies.

== Regional Council ==
The Regional Council of South Karelia is a joint municipal authority of nine member municipalities. The council operates as the authority for regional development and unit for regional planning and looks after regional interests and to promote economic development and cultural well-being in South Karelia. The council has statutory responsibility for regional development and planning.

The EU's regional Objective Programmes for South Karelia have partly been prepared in the council as it also implements and coordinates various projects. The council is also represented in several international organisations, such as AEBR.

== Municipalities ==
The region of South Karelia consists of two sub-regions and nine municipalities, two of which have city status (marked in bold).

=== Municipalities on the map ===
Cities and municipalities of South Karelia.

=== Sub-regions ===
Imatra sub-region

- **Imatra**
- Parikkala
- Rautjärvi
- Ruokolahti (Ruokolax)

Lappeenranta sub-region

- **Lappeenranta** (Villmanstrand)
- Lemi
- Luumäki
- Savitaipale
- Taipalsaari

=== Municipalities listed ===
Coat of arms	Municipality	Population	Land area (km^{2})	Density (/km^{2})	Finnish speakers	Swedish speakers	Other speakers
Coat of arms of Imatra	Imatra	24,345	155	157	90 %	0.1 %	10 %
Coat of arms of Lappeenranta	Lappeenranta	73,241	1,434	51	88 %	0.2 %	12 %
Coat of arms of Lemi	Lemi	2,878	218	13	97 %	0 %	2 %
Coat of arms of Luumäki	Luumäki	4,304	750	6	93 %	0.4 %	6 %
Coat of arms of Parikkala	Parikkala	4,235	592	7	97 %	0 %	3 %
Coat of arms of Rautjärvi	Rautjärvi	2,888	351	8	95 %	0 %	5 %
Coat of arms of Ruokolahti	Ruokolahti	4,679	942	5	95 %	0.2 %	4 %
Coat of arms of Savitaipale	Savitaipale	3,094	539	6	97 %	0.4 %	3 %
Coat of arms of Taipalsaari	Taipalsaari	4,574	345	13	93 %	0 %	7 %
	Total	124,238	5,326	23.3	90 %	0.2 %	10 %

== Tourism ==
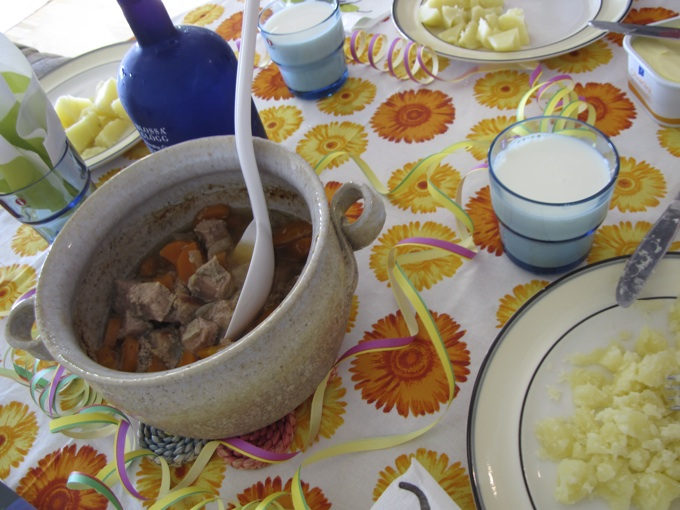
Karelian stew

South Karelia is a popular tourist area in Finland with its special features – its nature, its location between Lake Saimaa and the border as well as its cultural heritage and history as a border region. Thanks to the natural attractions, waterways and islands, tourism has natural prerequisites for developing in South Karelia. The provincial centres are continuously improving their services. Lappeenranta has in recent years focused particularly on tourism services for families, and Imatra on fishing and spa tourism. There is a good selection of agritourism attractions and tourism services available around the region.

South Karelia is known for Lake Saimaa, Saimaa Canal, Lappeenranta Fortification and Imatrankoski rapids, the Russian border and the short distance to Vyborg and St. Petersburg. Lappeenranta Fortification and its museums portray the history of the border zone and border arrangements over several centuries. Cruises on Lake Saimaa and along Saimaa Canal up to Vyborg are popular as well.

The region also features an interesting cross-section of churches that represent various centuries, architectural styles and denominations. The internationally best-known of these is the Church of the Three Crosses in Imatra designed by Alvar Aalto.

The South Karelian nature has played a key role in the history of tourism. The rapids of Imatrankoski and their surroundings became the first actual tourist attraction in Finland. Russian upper classes and civil servants, in particular, came to marvel at the wild foams of the rapids. In the summer of 1772, Russian Empress Catherine the Great visited Imatra for one day. Her journey from St. Petersburg to Imatra took five days. The rulers and dignitaries of many other countries have left a memento of their visit in the rocks surrounding the rapids. Actual tourism in the modern sense developed in the 19th century. It was speeded up by the completion of Saimaa Canal and St. Petersburg railway in the latter half of the century. What also drew tourists all the way from St. Petersburg was the good fishing to be had in River Vuoksi, Imatra Rapids and Lake Saimaa.

The Rauha – Tiuruniemi area by the Lake Saimaa has long traditions in spa and hotel activities. As early as 1894 the area's first hotel spa - Rauha pensionat för turister - was established. In 1912 a Russia-born physicist Dimitri Gabrilovitsch bought the place to transform it into a sanatorium. The clinic's services at the time were different kinds of baths as well as galvanic and bright light treatments. The clinic had visitors from Russia, Europe and even the Americas. The spa in Lappeenranta, which is still in business today, was founded in 1871.

Tourism in South Karelia went into a decline for some time after the First World War ended the flows of travellers from St. Petersburg. Interest in domestic travel, which had arisen towards the end of the 19th century, increased as conditions became more settled in the newly independent Finland. Tourism had its heyday before the 1930s depression. The area, including Lake Saimaa and the legendary beaches of Terijoki, was a popular area for holiday villas. Tourism was once more affected by the closing of the borders after the Second World War. The unspoilt nature and Lake Saimaa attracted tourists especially from Central Europe and the Nordic countries. The Germans discovered the rented holiday houses on the shores of Saimaa.

== Education ==
Lappeenranta has been voted the best university town in Finland due to its welcoming campus, numerous flats, and coordinated international student exchanges.

The education in Lappeenranta is considered to be of high standard.

Lappeenranta University of Technology and Saimaa University of Applied Sciences were the first universities in Finland to suggest mutual co-operation between two types of third-level educational institutes.

== Demographics ==
Population size 1990–2025
Year	Population
1990	140,244
1995	138,678
2000	136,299
2005	134,786
2010	132,899
2015	131,155
2020	126,921
2025	124,238

== Politics ==
For parliamentary elections, South Karelia, together with the regions of Kymenlaakso and South Savo, is part of the Southeast Finland constituency. As of 2023, the constituency elects 15 of the 200 members of the Parliament of Finland.
