= Voionmaa =

Voionmaa is a Finnish surname. Notable people with the surname include:

- Hannele Voionmaa (1953–2016), Finnish diplomat
- Tapio Voionmaa (1896–1960), Finnish diplomat
- Väinö Voionmaa (1869–1947), Finnish professor, diplomat and politician
