= Administrative divisions of Finland =

The administrative structure of Finland consists of three tiers: the autonomous municipalities, the intermediate regional level and the central government.

The local administrative units are the 309 municipalities (Finnish: kunta, Swedish: kommun), which may also designate themselves as cities (Finnish: kaupunki, Swedish: stad). Each municipality is governed by a democratically elected municipal council.

The municipalities are grouped into 19 regions (Finnish: maakunta, Swedish: landskap), which are administered by regional councils whose members are drawn from the municipal councils. The autonomous province of Åland forms its own region, with a democratically elected regional parliament (lagting). The municipalities are also organized into 70 sub-regions (Finnish: seutukunta, Swedish: ekonomisk region).

In 2023, a new democratically governed tier was introduced: the 21 wellbeing services counties (Finnish: hyvinvointialue, Swedish: välfärdsområde), which are responsible for organizing health, social, and emergency services at the regional level.

The central government operates regionally through various agencies. Since 1 January 2026, the main agencies are the Economic Development Centres (Finnish: elinvoimakeskukset) and the Finnish Supervisory Agency (Lupa- ja valvontavirasto, LVV).

== Municipalities ==
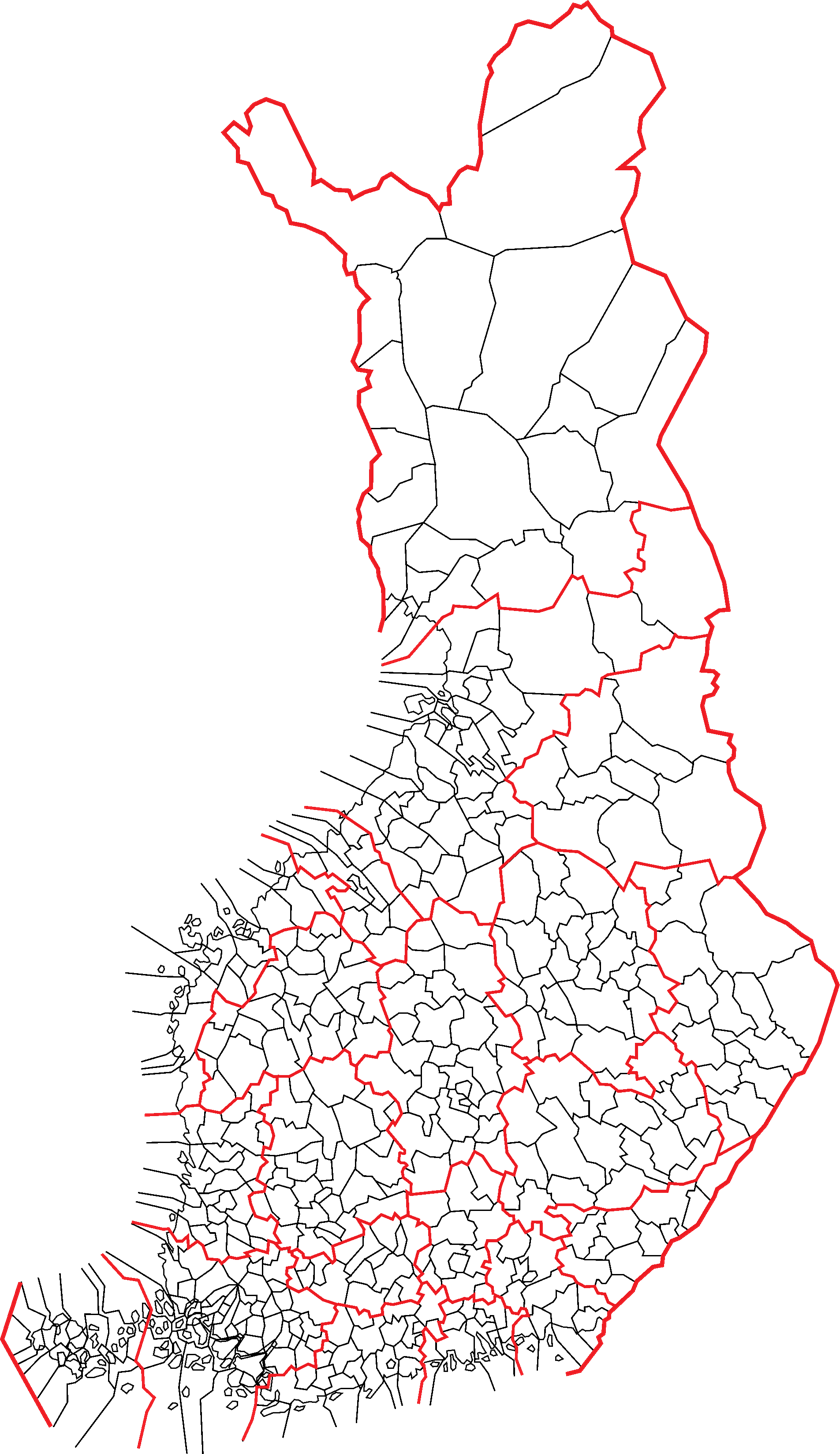
Municipalities and regions of Finland (2007). Black borders refer to municipalities, red to regions.

The municipalities (Finnish: kunta; Swedish: kommun) represent the local democracy and act as the basic self-governing administrative units of the country. The entire country is incorporated into municipalities and legally, all municipalities are equal, although certain municipalities are called cities or towns (Finnish: kaupunki; Swedish: stad). As of 2021, there are 309 municipalities. Most are small with median number of 6,000 residents.

Municipalities have the right to levy a flat percentual income tax, which is between 16 and 22 percent, and they provide two thirds of public services. Municipalities control many community services, such as schools, child care, water supply, and local streets. They are also responsible for urban planning and land use. They do not maintain highways, set laws or keep police forces, which are responsibilities of the central government. The responsibilities of providing healthcare, rescue, and social services were transferred from municipalities to wellbeing services counties in 2023.

The highest decision-making authority is the municipal council, whose members are elected for a four-year term. The municipal elections, which are based on a partisan list, provide a democratic counterbalance to the Parliament.

== Regions and sub-regions ==
The municipalities in mainland Finland are grouped into 18 regions (maakunta, landskap). The regions are governed by regional councils, which serve as forums of cooperation for the municipalities. Regional council members are selected from among the members of the municipal councils. The statutory functions of the regions are regional development and regional land-use planning. They also responsible for the coordination of EU structural funds. The autonomous province of Åland forms its own region, with a democratically elected regional parliament (lagting).

== Wellbeing service counties ==
The 21 wellbeing services counties occupy middle level between the parliament and the municipal councils. The borders of the counties are mainly based on the regions. The wellbeing services counties are responsible for organising health, social welfare and emergency services. They do not have the right to levy taxes, but the central government allocates the funding to the Wellbeing Services Counties based on the population structure. The City of Helsinki and the province of Åland remain outside the wellbeing services county structure.

The County Council is the highest decision-making body in each wellbeing service county. The delegates and the deputy commissioners of the County Council are elected in the county elections for a term of office of four years. The number of delegates varies between 59 and 89, depending on the number of inhabitants. The council is responsible for operations, administration and finance of the county.

== State administration ==
The state administration, the ministries and central agencies, operate at a regional level through various regional agencies. These agencies are distinct from the self-governing regional level.

Since 1 January 2026, the main agencies are the Economic Development Centres (Finnish: elinvoimakeskukset) and the Finnish Supervisory Agency (Lupa- ja valvontavirasto, LVV).

Until 31 December 2025, the two main state regional authorities were the Regional State Administrative Agencies (Aluehallintovirasto or AVI) and the Centres for Economic Development, Transport and the Environment (Elinkeino-, liikenne- ja ympäristökeskus or ELY-keskus).

== Other administrative arrangements ==
Sami people have a semi-autonomous Sami Domicile Area in Lapland for issues on language and culture.

== See also ==
- List of municipalities of Finland
- List of former municipalities of Finland
- Subdivisions of the Nordic countries
