= Ryti I cabinet =

23rd government of the Republic of Finland (1939-40)

Ryti I Cabinet
- 23rd Cabinet of Finland
- Date formed: December 1939
- Date dissolved: 27 March 1940

People and organisations
- Prime Minister: Risto Ryti
- Total no. of members: 14
- Member parties: National Progressive; Agrarian League; SDP; RKP
- Status in legislature: Majority government

History
- Predecessor: Cajander III
- Successor: Ryti II

Risto Ryti's first cabinet was the 23rd government of Republic of Finland. Cabinet's time period was from December 1, 1939, to March 27, 1940. It was a majority government.

Assembly
Minister	Period of office	Party
Prime Minister; Risto Ryti	December 1, 1939 – March 27, 1940	National Progressive Party
Minister for Foreign Affairs; Väinö Tanner	December 1, 1939 – March 27, 1940	Social Democratic Party of Finland
Minister of Justice; Johan Otto Söderhjelm	December 1, 1939 – March 27, 1940	Swedish People's Party
Minister of Interior; Ernst von Born	December 1, 1939 – March 27, 1940	Swedish People's Party
Minister of Defence; Juho Niukkanen	December 1, 1939 – March 27, 1940	Agrarian League
Minister of Finance; Mauno Pekkala	December 1, 1939 – March 27, 1940	Social Democratic Party of Finland
Minister of Education; Uuno Hannula	December 1, 1939 – March 27, 1940	Agrarian League
Minister of Agriculture; Pekka Heikkinen	December 1, 1939 – March 27, 1940	Agrarian League
Deputy Minister of Agriculture; Juho Koivisto	December 1, 1939 – March 27, 1940	Agrarian League
Minister of Transport and Public Works; Väinö Salovaara	December 1, 1939 – March 27, 1940	Social Democratic Party of Finland
Minister of Trade and Industry; Väinö Kotilainen	December 1, 1939 – March 27, 1940	Independent
Minister of Social Affairs; Karl-August Fagerholm	December 1, 1939 – March 27, 1940	Social Democratic Party of Finland
Minister of People's Service; Rainer von Fieandt	December 1, 1939 – March 27, 1940	Independent
Minister without Portfolio; Juho Kusti Paasikivi	December 1, 1939 – March 27, 1940	National Coalition Party

Preceded by Cajander III	Cabinet of Finland; December 1, 1939–March 27, 1940	Succeeded by Ryti II
