= Cajander III cabinet =

22nd government of the Republic of Finland (1937-39)

Cajander III Cabinet
- 22nd Cabinet of Finland
- Date formed: 12 March 1937
- Date dissolved: 1 December 1939

People and organisations
- Prime Minister: Aimo Cajander
- Member parties: National Progressive; SDP; Agrarian League; RKP
- Status in legislature: Majority government

History
- Predecessor: Kallio IV
- Successor: Ryti I

Aimo Cajander's third cabinet was the 22nd government of Republic of Finland. Cabinet's time period was from March 12, 1937 to December 1, 1939. It was a majority government.

Assembly
Minister	Period of office	Party
Prime Minister; Aimo Cajander	March 12, 1937 – December 1, 1939	National Progressive Party
Minister for Foreign Affairs; Rudolf Holsti; Väinö Voionmaa(deputy); Eljas Erkko	March 12, 1937 – November 16, 1938; November 16, 1938 – December 1, 1938; December 12, 1938 – December 1, 1939	National Progressive Party; Social Democrat; National Progressive Party
Minister of Justice; Arvi Ahmavaara; Albin Ewald Rautavaara; Johan Otto Söderhjelm	March 18, 1937 – January 11, 1938; January 11, 1938 – October 13, 1939; October 13, 1939 – December 1, 1939	Independent; Independent; Swedish People's Party
Minister of Defence; Juho Niukkanen	March 12, 1937 – March 12, 1937	Agrarian League
Minister of the Interior; Urho Kekkonen	March 12, 1936 – March 12, 1937	Agrarian League
Minister of Finance; Väinö Tanner	March 12, 1937 – December 1, 1939	Social Democrat
Minister of Education; Uuno Hannula	March 12, 1937 – December 1, 1939	Agrarian League
Minister of Agriculture; Pekka Heikkinen	March 12, 1937 – December 1, 1939	Agrarian League
Deputy Minister of Agriculture; Juho Koivisto	March 12, 1937 – December 1, 1939	Agrarian League
Minister of Transport and Public Works; Hannes Ryömä; Väinö Salovaara	March 12, 1937 – September 2, 1938; September 2, 1938 – December 1, 1939	Social Democrat; Social Democrat
Deputy Minister of Transport and Public Works; Väinö Salovaara; Pietari Salmenoja	March 12, 1937 – September 2, 1938; September 2, 1938 – December 1, 1939	Social Democrat; Social Democrat
Minister of Trade and Industry; Väinö Voionmaa	March 12, 1937 – December 1, 1939	Social Democrat
Minister of Social Affairs; Jaakko Keto; Karl-August Fagerholm	March 12, 1937 – November 9, 1937; November 9, 1937 – December 1, 1939	Social Democrat; Social Democrat
Deputy Minister of Social Affairs; Oskari Reinikainen	March 12, 1937 – December 1, 1939	Social Democrat
People's Service Minister; Rainer von Fieandt	September 20, 1939 – December 1, 1939	Independent
Minister without Portfolio; Ernst von Born	October 13, 1939 – December 1, 1939	Swedish People's Party

Preceded by Kallio IV	Cabinet of Finland; March 3, 1937–December 1, 1939	Succeeded by Ryti I
