= Lapland (former province of Finland) =

Province of Finland (1938–2009)

Coordinates: 66.50396°N 25.72936°E

Province of Lapland Lapin lääni Lapplands län
- Province of Finland
- 1938–2009
- Coat of arms

- Capital: Rovaniemi
- Area
  - 1 January 1993: 98,937 km^{2} (38,200 sq mi)
  - 31 December 2009: 98,937 km^{2} (38,200 sq mi)
- Population
  - 1 January 1993: 202,433
  - 31 December 2009: 183,775
- History
  - Established: 1938
  - Disestablished: 2009
Preceded by
Province of Oulu

The Province of Lapland (Finnish: Lapin lääni, Swedish: Lapplands län) was a province of Finland from 1938 to 2009.

It was established in 1938, when it was separated from the Province of Oulu. After the Second World War and the Continuation War, the Petsamo municipality (former province) and part of the Salla municipality were ceded to the Soviet Union.

It had the same territory as today's region Lapland (Finland).

== Maps ==
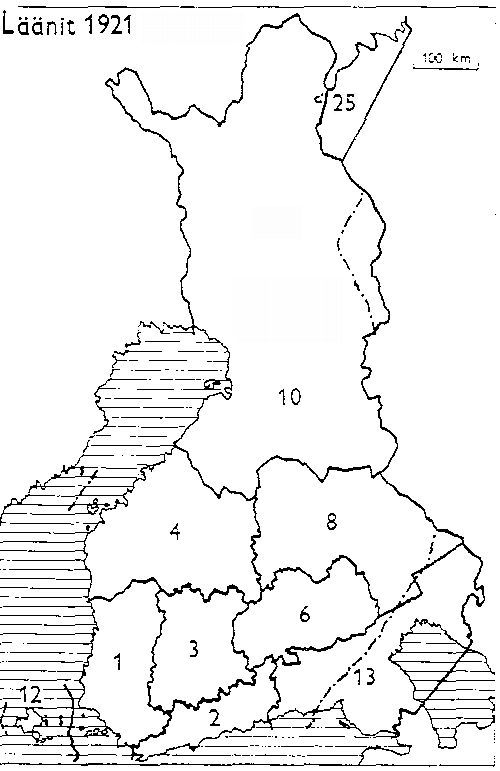
Provinces of Finland 1921: 1: Turku and Pori, 2: Uusimaa, 3: Häme, 4: Vaasa, 6: Mikkeli, 8: Kuopio, 10: Oulu, 12: Åland, 13: Viipuri, 25: Petsamo

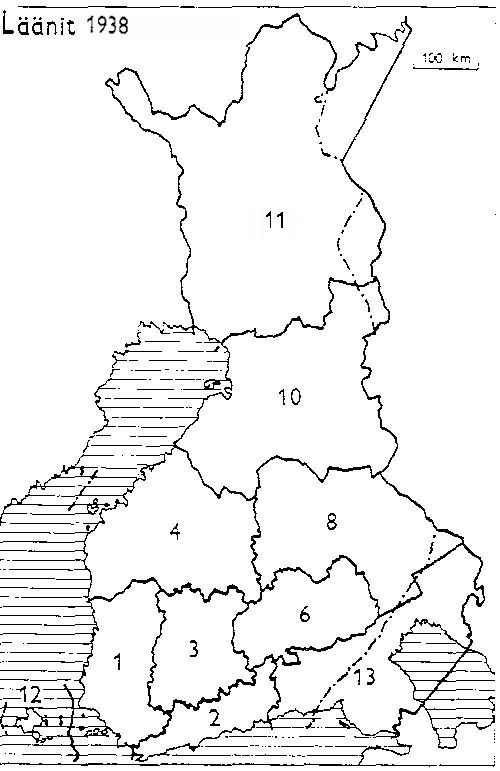
Provinces of Finland 1938: 1: Turku and Pori, 2: Uusimaa, 3: Häme, 4: Vaasa, 6: Mikkeli, 8: Kuopio, 10: Oulu, 11: Lapland, 12: Åland, 13: Viipuri

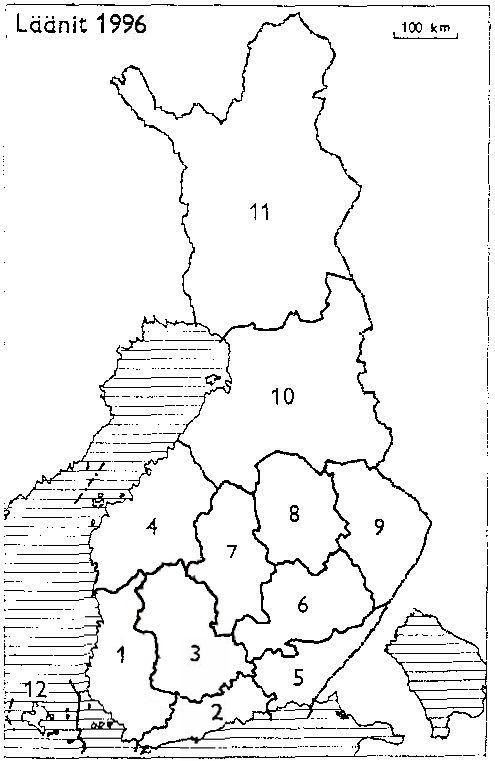
Provinces of Finland 1996: 1: Turku and Pori, 2: Uusimaa, 3: Häme, 4: Vaasa, 5: Kymi, 6: Mikkeli, 7: Central Finland, 8: Kuopio, 9: Northern Karelia, 10: Oulu, 11: Lapland, 12: Åland

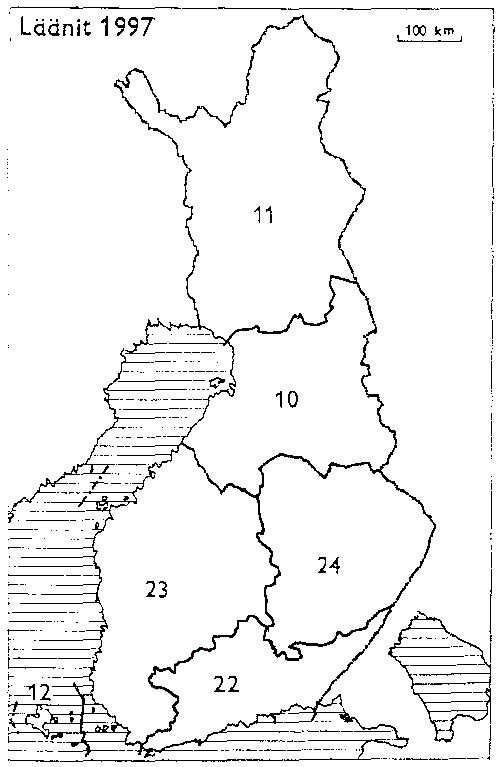
Provinces of Finland 1997: 10: Oulu, 11: Lapland, 12: Åland, 22: Southern Finland, 23: Western Finland, 24: Eastern Finland

== Administration ==
The State Provincial Office was a joint regional authority of seven different ministries. It promoted national and regional objectives of the State central administration.

== Regions ==
When provinces were abolished in January 2010, the province of Lapland was reorganized into one region:

- Lapland (Finnish: Lappi, Swedish: Lappland)

== Municipalities in 2009 (cities in bold) ==
- Enontekiö
- Inari
- **Kemi**
- **Kemijärvi**
- Keminmaa
- Kittilä
- Kolari
- Muonio
- Pelkosenniemi
- Pello
- Posio
- Ranua
- **Rovaniemi**
- Salla
- Savukoski
- Simo
- Sodankylä
- Tervola
- **Tornio**
- Utsjoki
- Ylitornio

== Former municipalities (disestablished before 2009) ==
- Alatornio
- Karunki
- Kemijärven mlk
- Petsamo
- Rovaniemen mlk

== Governors ==
- Kaarlo Hillilä 1938–1947
- Uuno Hannula 1947–1958
- Martti Miettunen 1958–1973
- Asko Oinas 1974–1994
- Hannele Pokka 1994–2008
- Timo E. Korva 2008–2009
