= Nuorten Ystävät =

Nuorten Ystävät ry.
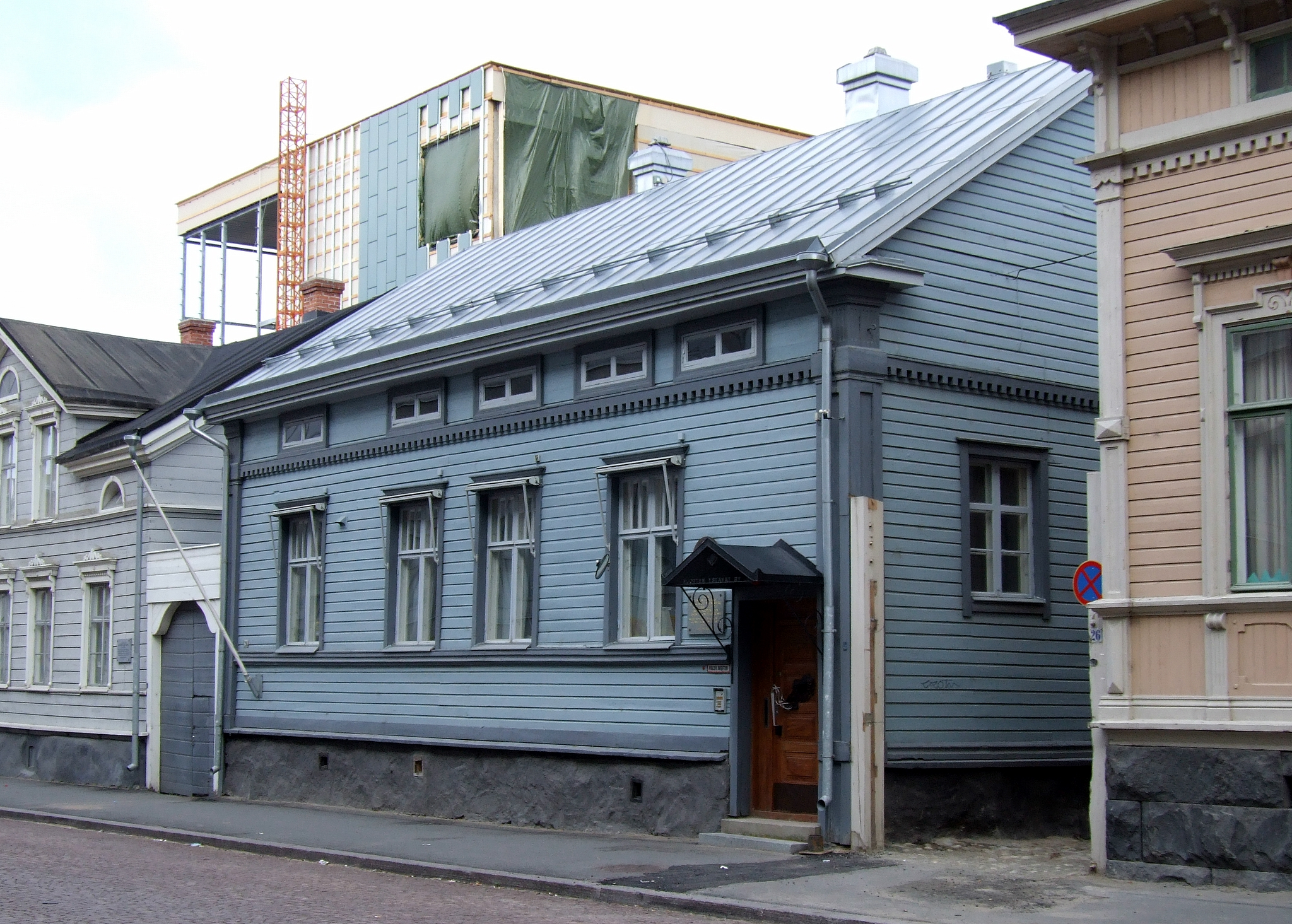
- The Waenerberg House in Oulu, named after the founder Georg Waenerberg.
- Formation: 1907
- Founder: Georg Waenerberg
- Purpose: Social services
- Headquarters: Oulu, Finland
- Region served: Finland
- Secretary General: Arja Sutela
- Website: www.nuortenystavat.fi

Nuorten Ystävät (Finnish for "Friends of the Youth") is an organization founded in 1907, working in social and health sectors providing expertise and national social and health services for the young. Nuorten Ystävät owns over 40 units in 18 different towns and cities all over Finland, headquartering in Oulu.

== Operations ==
- Child welfare
- Housing of special groups (the disabled, ones with long-term illnesses etc.)
- Social rehabilitation and employment
- Private approved schools
- Clubhouses

== Criticism ==
In November 2011 an MTV3 show called 45 minuuttia exposed that a Nuorten Ystävät unit called Pohjolakoti in Muhos had used a concrete jail to isolate children. This was done at least 34 times in 2011. Regional State Administrative Agency of Northern Finland inspected Pohjolakoti after MTV3 had interviewed the representatives of the approved school.
In the early fall of 2018, the debuty ombudsman and government inspectors performed a surprise checkup in Pohjolakoti and found serious deficiency in adherence of the Child Welfare Act of Finland, i.e. extrajudicial, oppressing and humiliating practices. For example, the freedom of movement of the children has been restricted illegally, the children have been forced to undress themselves completely during body search without sufficient protection of privacy, the personnel have been restraining children without adequate reasoning, and youths have been isolated to their rooms without record or decisions required by the law. The inspection gained massive media attention, and in November, the Finnish News Agency wrote that the Finnish National Bureau of Investigation has started an investigation regarding Pohjolakoti. The bureau is trying to investigate if the personnel are guilty of assault, deprivation of personal liberty or violation of official duty. Pohjolakoti has stated that they have improved the conditions in the approved school and foster homes after the inspection. Both National Supervisory Authority for Welfare and Health and Regional State Administrative Agencies have since reviewed the practices in Pohjolakoti and they have stated that the conditions have improved and they did not find any inappropriate practices.

== Sources ==
- Nuorten Ystävät ry
