= ISO 3166-2:FI =

Entry for Finland in ISO 3166-2

ISO 3166-2:FI is the entry for Finland in ISO 3166-2, part of the ISO 3166 standard published by the International Organization for Standardization (ISO), which defines codes for the names of the principal subdivisions (e.g. provinces or states) of all countries coded in ISO 3166-1.

Currently for Finland, ISO 3166-2 codes are defined for 19 regions (under six Regional State Administrative Agencies plus Åland).

Each code consists of two parts, separated by a hyphen. The first part is FI, the ISO 3166-1 alpha-2 code of Finland. The second part is two digits.

Åland (Finnish: Ahvenanmaan maakunta; Swedish: Landskapet Åland), an autonomous region of Finland (also a former province), is also officially assigned its own country code in ISO 3166-1, with alpha-2 code AX.

== Current codes ==
Map of the subdivisions of Finland

Subdivision names are listed as in the ISO 3166-2 standard published by the ISO 3166 Maintenance Agency (ISO 3166/MA).

ISO 639-1 codes are used to represent subdivision names in the following administrative languages:

- (fi): Finnish
- (sv): Swedish

In addition, the list also includes translation to English (en).

Subdivision names are sorted in Finnish alphabetical order: a–z, å, ä, ö.

Click on the button in the header to sort each column.

=== Regions ===
Code	Subdivision name (fi)	Subdivision name (sv)	Subdivision name (en) (Note: For reference only: the English names are not included in the ISO 3166-2 standard. The names given here are those recommended by the Prime Minister’s Office. These differ from the recommendations submitted to UNGEGN, which recommend the Finnish name forms for Etelä-Savo, Pohjois-Savo, and Varsinais-Suomi.)
FI-01	Ahvenanmaan maakunta	Landskapet Åland	Åland
FI-02	Etelä-Karjala	Södra Karelen	South Karelia
FI-03	Etelä-Pohjanmaa	Södra Österbotten	South Ostrobothnia
FI-04	Etelä-Savo	Södra Savolax	South Savo
FI-05	Kainuu	Kajanaland	Kainuu
FI-06	Kanta-Häme	Egentliga Tavastland	Kanta-Häme
FI-07	Keski-Pohjanmaa	Mellersta Österbotten	Central Ostrobothnia
FI-08	Keski-Suomi	Mellersta Finland	Central Finland
FI-09	Kymenlaakso	Kymmenedalen	Kymenlaakso
FI-10	Lappi	Lappland	Lapland
FI-11	Pirkanmaa	Birkaland	Pirkanmaa
FI-12	Pohjanmaa	Österbotten	Ostrobothnia
FI-13	Pohjois-Karjala	Norra Karelen	North Karelia
FI-14	Pohjois-Pohjanmaa	Norra Österbotten	North Ostrobothnia
FI-15	Pohjois-Savo	Norra Savolax	North Savo
FI-16	Päijät-Häme	Päijänne-Tavastland	Päijät-Häme
FI-17	Satakunta	Satakunta	Satakunta
FI-18	Uusimaa	Nyland	Uusimaa
FI-19	Varsinais-Suomi	Egentliga Finland	Southwest Finland

== Changes ==
The following changes to the entry have been announced by the ISO 3166/MA since the first publication of ISO 3166-2 in 1998:

Newsletter	Date issued	Description of change in newsletter	Code/Subdivision change
Newsletter II-3	2011-12-13 (corrected 2011-12-15)	Administrative re-organization, deletion of useless information and the region names in English and French, source list and source code update.	Subdivision layout: 6 provinces (see below) → 19 regions
ISO Online Browsing Platform (OBP)	2022-11-29	Change of spelling of FI-17; Update List Source	Name change: Satakunda → Satakunta

=== Codes before Newsletter II-3 ===
Provinces of Finland

Former code	Subdivision name (fi)	Subdivision name (sv)
FI-AL	Ahvenanmaan lääni	Ålands län
FI-ES	Etelä-Suomen lääni	Södra Finlands län
FI-IS	Itä-Suomen lääni	Östra Finlands län
FI-LL	Lapin lääni	Lapplands län
FI-LS	Länsi-Suomen lääni	Västra Finlands län
FI-OL	Oulun lääni	Uleåborgs län

== See also ==
- Subdivisions of Finland
- FIPS region codes of Finland
- NUTS codes of Finland
- Neighbouring countries: NO, RU, SE
