= Arpela =

Village in Tornio, Finland

- Village
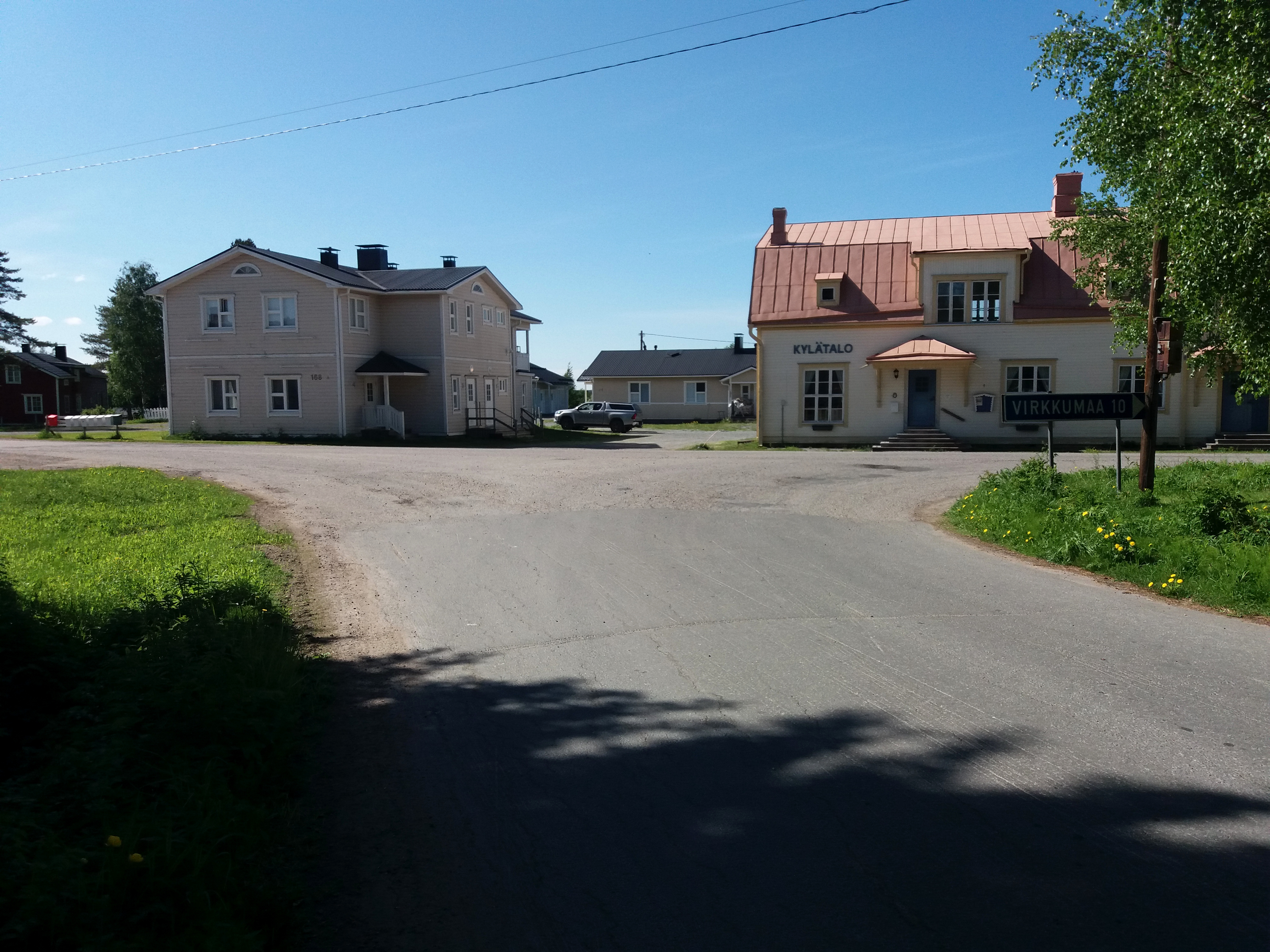
- The village centre.

- Location in Finland
- Coordinates: 66°01.0574′N 24°23.1109′E
- Country: Finland
- Province: Lapland
- Municipality: Tornio

Area
  - Total: 0.72 sq mi (1.87 km^{2})

Population (31 December 2023)
  - Total: 232
  - Density: 3,210/sq mi (1,241/km^{2})
- Postal code: 95590

Arpela is a village in the municipality of Tornio in Lapland in north-western Finland. It is located 25 kilometres (16 mi) northeast of the Tornio city center, on the banks of the Kaakamajoki River, and 26 kilometres (16 mi) from the Tervola's settlement along regional road 927. At the end of 2023, the village's urban area had 232 residents, while its scattered population covers approximately 500 residents.

Arpela is home to, among others, Arja Sipola, the first Finnish tango queen elected at the Seinäjoki Tangomarkkinat in 1987, and Kaisa Juuso, the Finns Party politician appointed the Minister of Social Affairs and Health in 2023.

== See also ==
- Alatornio
