= Kiikoinen =

- Former municipality
- Kiikoisten kunta Kiikoinens kommun
- Coat of arms

- Location of Kiikoinen in Finland
- Coordinates: 61°27′N 022°34.5′E
- Country: Finland
- Region: Satakunta
- Sub-region: Northern Satakunta sub-region
- Charter: 1847

Government
  - Municipal manager: Tapio Rautava

Area
  - Total: 144.32 km^{2} (55.72 sq mi)
  - Land: 138.03 km^{2} (53.29 sq mi)
  - Water: 6.29 km^{2} (2.43 sq mi)

Population (31 December 2012)
  - Total: 1,245
  - Density: 9.020/km^{2} (23.36/sq mi)
- Time zone: UTC+2 (EET)
  - Summer (DST): UTC+3 (EEST)
- Climate: Dfc
- Website: www.kiikoinen.fi

Kiikoinen (Swedish: Kiikoinen, also Kikois) is a former municipality of Finland.

It was located in the province of Western Finland and was part of the Satakunta region. The municipality had a population of 1,245 (31 December 2012) and covered an area of 144.32 square kilometres (55.72 sq mi) of which 6.29 km^{2} (2.43 sq mi) is water. The population density was 9.020/km^{2} (23.361/sq mi).

The municipality was unilingually Finnish. In 2013, it was consolidated with the municipality of Sastamala.
