= Provinces of Finland =

Former administrative division of Finland

Between 1634 and 2009, Finland was administered as several provinces, or counties (Finnish: Suomen läänit, Swedish: Finlands län). Finland had always been a unitary state: the provincial authorities were part of the central government's executive branch and apart from Åland, the provinces had little autonomy. There were never any elected provincial parliaments in continental Finland.

The system was initially created by the Instrument of Government of 1634 when Finland was a part of Sweden. When Finland was annexed by the Russian Empire and made into the Grand Duchy of Finland (1809–1917), the regional administration remained the same. The Vyborg Governorate was initially not part of the Grand Duchy, but in 1812, it was transferred from Russia proper to Finland. The provinces continued also under the independent Finland after 1917.

The makeup of the provinces changed drastically on 1 September 1997, when the number of the provinces was reduced from twelve to six. This effectively made them purely administrative units, as linguistic and cultural boundaries no longer followed the borders of the provinces.

The provinces were eventually abolished at the end of 2009. Consequently, different ministries may subdivide their areal organization differently. Besides the former provinces, the municipalities of Finland form the fundamental subdivisions of the country. In current use are the regions of Finland, a smaller subdivision where some pre-1997 läänis are split into multiple regions. Åland retains its special autonomous status and its own regional parliament.

== Duties ==
Each province was led by a governor (Finnish: maaherra, Swedish: landshövding) appointed by the president on the recommendation of the cabinet. The governor was the head of the State Provincial Office (Finnish: lääninhallitus, Swedish: länsstyrelse), which acted as the joint regional authority for seven ministries in the following domains:

- social services and health care
- education and culture
- police administration
- rescue services
- traffic administration
- competition and consumer affairs
- judicial administration

The official administrative subentities under the Provincial Office authorities were the Registry Offices (Finnish: maistraatti, Swedish: magistrat). Formerly there was also a division to state local districts (Finnish: kihlakunta, Swedish: härad), which were districts for police, prosecution, and bailiff services, but there was reorganization such that 24 police districts were founded. These usually encompass multiple municipalities.

Provinces governed only state offices, such as the police. Most services, such as healthcare and maintenance of local streets, were and remain today the responsibility of municipalities of Finland. Many municipalities are too small for a hospital and some other services, so they cooperate in municipality groups, e.g. health care districts, using borders that vary depending on the type of service. Often Swedish-language municipalities cooperate even if they do not share a border.

== History ==
In 1634, administratives provinces were formed in Sweden, and therefore in Finland, which was a part of Sweden until 1809. Five of the provinces covered what is now Finland; some of these also covered parts of what are now Russia. The exact division of the country into provinces has fluctuated over time.

The Vyborg Governorate was established in territories ceded by the Swedish Empire in the Great Northern War. By the Treaty of Nystad in 1721, Sweden formally ceded control of the parts of the Viborg and Nyslott County and the Kexholm County located on the Karelian Isthmus to Russia. The governorate was extended in 1743 when Sweden ceded control of the rest of Viborg and Nyslott, now called the Kymmenegård and Nyslott County, by the Treaty of Åbo. In the Swedish kingdom the ceded territories was also known as Old Finland (Swedish: Gamla Finland, Finnish: Vanha Suomi), and between 1802 and 1812 it was named the "Finland Governorate".

During the Napoleonic Wars, the Kingdom of Sweden had allied itself with the Russian Empire, United Kingdom and the other parties against Napoleonic France. However, following the treaty of Treaty of Tilsit in 1807, Russia made peace with France. In 1808, and supported by France, Russia successfully challenged the Swedish control over Finland in the Finnish War. In the Treaty of Fredrikshamn on September 17, 1809 Sweden was obliged to cede all its territory in Finland, east of the Torne River, to Russia. The ceded territories became a part of the Russian Empire and was reconstituted into the Grand Duchy of Finland, with the Russian Tsar as Grand Duke.

In 1812 the Vyborg Governorate was transferred from Russia proper to the Grand Duchy. The transfer, announced by Tsar Alexander I just before Christmas, on December 23, 1811 O.S. (January 4, 1812 N.S.), can be seen as a symbolic gesture and an attempt to appease the sentiment of the Finnish population, which had just experienced Russian conquest of their country by force in the Finnish War.

In 1831 the Nyland-Tavastehus Governorate (Russian: Нюланд-Тавастгусская губерния, Swedish: Nylands och Tavastehus län, Finnish: Uudenmaan ja Hämeen lääni) was divided into the Nyland Governorate and the Tavastehus Governorate.

Upon the death of Tsar Nicholas I in 1855, the official name of the city of Vasa (Vaasa) was changed to Nikolaistad (Russian: Николайстад, Finnish: Nikolainkaupunki). However, the name of the Vasa Governorate (Russian: Вазаская губерния, Swedish: Vasa län, Finnish: Vaasan lääni) was not changed correspondingly.

When Finland declared itself independent on December 6, 1917, the provinces continued as subdivisions of an independent Republic of Finland.

== After abolition ==
The provinces were abolished altogether effective 1 January 2010. Since then, the regional administration of the Finnish state has two parallel top-level organs in the hierarchy: the Centres for Economic Development, Transport and the Environment on the one hand, and the Regional State Administrative Agencies on the other.

Six Regional State Administrative Agencies (aluehallintovirasto, regionförvaltningsverk, abbr. avi) – in addition to the State Department of Åland – are primarily responsible for law enforcement. Among these, South-Western Finland and Western and Central Finland cover the former province of Western Finland, and the former province of Oulu was revamped as Northern Finland; other old provincial boundaries remain much the same in the new disposition.

In parallel, there are 15 Centres for Economic Development, Transport and the Environment (Finnish: elinkeino-, liikenne- ja ympäristökeskus, usually abbreviated ely-keskus), which are responsible for other state administration: employment, road and transport infrastructure, and environmental monitoring. They are each responsible for one or more of regions of Finland, and include offices of the Ministries of Employment and the Economy, Transport and Communications and Environment.

The boundaries of the old provinces partly survive in telephone area codes and electoral districts.

== List of provinces ==
English name	Finnish name	Swedish name	Residence city	Dates of existence	Notes
Province of Turku and Pori	Turun ja Porin lääni	Åbo och Björneborgs län	Turku	1634–1997	• one of the original provinces formed in 1634, though parts were split off since then • merged into the Province of Western Finland
Province of Nyland and Tavastehus	Uudenmaan ja Hämeen lääni	Nylands och Tavastehus län	Helsinki/Hämeenlinna	1634–1831	• one of the original provinces formed in 1634
Province of Ostrobothnia	Pohjanmaan lääni	Österbottens län	Oulu/Vaasa	1634–1775	• one of the original provinces formed in 1634
Province of Viborg and Nyslott	Viipurin ja Savonlinnan lääni	Viborgs och Nyslotts län	Vyborg	1634–1721	• one of the original provinces formed in 1634
Province of Kexholm	Käkisalmen lääni	Kexholms län	Kexholm	1634–1721	• one of the original provinces formed in 1634
Province of Kymmenegård and Nyslott	Savonlinnan ja Kymenkartanon lääni	Kymmenegårds och Nyslotts län	Lappeenranta	1721–1747	• former Province of Viborg and Nyslott
Province of Savolax and Kymmenegård	Kymenkartanon ja Savon lääni	Savolax och Kymmenegårds län	Loviisa	1747–1775	• former Province of Kymmenegård and Nyslott
Province of Vaasa	Vaasan lääni	Vasa län	Vaasa	1775–1997	• split off from the Province of Ostrobothnia • merged into the Province of Western Finland
Province of Oulu	Oulun lääni	Uleåborgs län	Oulu	1775–2009	• split off from the Province of Ostrobothnia
Province of Kymmenegård	Kymenkartanon lääni	Kymmenegårds län	Heinola	1775–1831	• split off from the Province of Savolax and Kymmenegård
Province of Savolax and Karelia	Savon ja Karjalan lääni	Savolax och Karelens län	Kuopio	1775–1831	• split off from the Province of Savolax and Kymmenegård
Province of Viipuri	Viipurin lääni	Viborgs län	Vyborg	1812–1947	• Russian Vyborg Governorate 1744-1812; transferred as Province of Viipuri to autonomous Grand Duchy of Finland in 1812 • most of its area was lost to the Soviet Union in World War II, and the remainder became the Province of Kymi
Province of Uusimaa	Uudenmaan lääni	Nylands län	Helsinki	1831–1997	• produced by splitting the Province of Nyland and Tavastehus • merged into the Province of Southern Finland
Province of Häme	Hämeen lääni	Tavastehus län	Hämeenlinna	1831–1997	• produced by splitting the Province of Nyland and Tavastehus • merged into the Provinces of Southern Finland and Western Finland
Province of Mikkeli	Mikkelin lääni	St. Michels län	Mikkeli	1831–1997	• former Province of Kymmenegård • merged into the Provinces of Eastern Finland and Southern Finland
Province of Kuopio	Kuopion lääni	Kuopio län	Kuopio	1831–1997	• former Province of Savolax and Karelia • merged into the Province of Eastern Finland
Province of Åland	Ahvenanmaan lääni	Ålands län	Mariehamn	1918–2009	• had a special status: even though the province was discontinued at the end of 2009 along with the others, there was (and still is) a coextensive "maakunta" (a translation of "province" with a slightly different meaning from the usual) that is semi-autonomous and demilitarized by international treaties
Province of Petsamo	Petsamon lääni	Petsamo län	Pechenga	1921–1921	• gained from Soviet Russia • merged into the Province of Oulu • the entire area of the former Province of Pechenga was lost to the Soviet Union in World War II
Province of Lapland	Lapin lääni	Lapplands län	Rovaniemi	1938–2009	• split off from the Province of Oulu
Province of Kymi	Kymen lääni	Kymmene län	Kouvola	1945–1997	• formed from the part of the Province of Viipuri that remained on the Finnish side of the border with Russia • merged into the Province of Southern Finland
Province of Central Finland	Keski-Suomen lääni	Mellersta Finlands län	Jyväskylä	1960–1997	• split off from the Provinces of Vaasa, Häme, Mikkeli and Kuopio • merged into the Province of Western Finland
Province of Northern Karelia	Pohjois-Karjalan lääni	Norra Karelens län	Joensuu	1960–1997	• split off from the Province of Kuopio • merged into the Province of Eastern Finland
Province of Southern Finland	Etelä-Suomen lääni	Södra Finlands län	Hämeenlinna	1997–2009	• merged from Provinces of Uusimaa, Kymi, Häme (part) and Mikkeli (part)
Province of Western Finland	Länsi-Suomen lääni	Västra Finlands län	Turku	1997–2009	• merged from Provinces of Turku and Pori, Vaasa, Central Finland and Häme (part)
Province of Eastern Finland	Itä-Suomen lääni	Östra Finlands län	Mikkeli	1997–2009	• merged from Provinces of Kuopio, Northern Karelia and Michelle

== Geographical evolution ==
=== Finland under Swedish rule ===
1634-1640
1 Turku
2 Uusimaa and Tavastia
3 Ostrobothnia
4 Karelia
5 Käkisalmi

1640-1641
1 Turku
2 Uusimaa
3 Ostrobothnia
4 Karelia
5 Käkisalmi
6 Tavastia

1641-1642
1 Turku
2 Uusimaa
3 Ostrobothnia
4 Viipuri
5 Käkisalmi
6 Tavastia
7 Savonlinna
8 Pori

1642-1646
1 Turku
2 Uusimaa
3 Oulu
4 Viipuri
5 Käkisalmi
6 Tavastia
7 Savonlinna
8 Pori
9 Vaasa

1647-1648
1 Turku and Pori
2 Uusimaa
3 Oulu
4 Viipuri
5 Käkisalmi
6 Tavastia
7 Savonlinna
8 Vaasa

1648-1650
1 Turku and Pori
2 Uusimaa and Tavastia
3 Ostrobothnia
4 Viipuri
5 Käkisalmi
6 Savonlinna

1650-1721
1 Turku and Pori
2 Uusimaa and Tavastia
3 Ostrobothnia
4 Viipuri and Savonlinna
5 Käkisalmi

1721-1743
1 Turku and Pori
2 Uusimaa and Tavastia
3 Ostrobothnia
4 Savonlinna and
Kymenkartano

1743-1747
1 Turku and Pori
2 Uusimaa and Tavastia
3 Ostrobothnia
4 Savonlinna and
Kymenkartano

1747-1776
1 Turku and Pori
2 Uusimaa and Tavastia
3 Ostrobothnia
4 Kymenkartano and
Savonia

1776-1809
1 Turku and Pori
2 Uusimaa and Tavastia
3 Oulu
4 Kymenkartano
5 Vaasa
6 Savonia and Karelia

=== Grand Duchy of Finland ===
1809-1812
1 Turku and Pori
2 Uusimaa and Tavastia
3 Oulu
4 Kymenkartano
5 Vaasa
6 Savonia and Karelia

1812-1831
1 Turku and Pori
2 Uusimaa and Tavastia
3 Oulu
4 Kymenkartano
5 Vaasa
6 Savonia and Karelia
7 Viipuri

1831-1833
1 Turku and Pori
2 Uusimaa
3 Oulu
4 Mikkeli
5 Vaasa
6 Kuopio
7 Viipuri
8 Tavastia

1833-1917
1 Turku and Pori
2 Uusimaa
3 Oulu
4 Mikkeli
5 Vaasa
6 Kuopio
7 Viipuri
8 Tavastia

=== Independent Finland ===
1917-1918
1 Turku and Pori
2 Uusimaa
3 Oulu
4 Mikkeli
5 Vaasa
6 Kuopio
7 Viipuri
8 Tavastia

1918-1920/1921
1 Turku and Pori
2 Uusimaa
3 Oulu
4 Mikkeli
5 Vaasa
6 Kuopio
7 Viipuri
8 Tavastia
9 Åland

1921
1 Turku and Pori
2 Uusimaa
3 Oulu
4 Mikkeli
5 Vaasa
6 Kuopio
7 Viipuri
8 Tavastia
9 Åland
10 Petsamo

1922-1938
1 Turku and Pori
2 Uusimaa
3 Oulu
4 Mikkeli
5 Vaasa
6 Kuopio
7 Viipuri
8 Tavastia
9 Åland

1938-1940; 1941–1944
1 Turku and Pori
2 Uusimaa
3 Oulu
4 Mikkeli
5 Vaasa
6 Kuopio
7 Viipuri
8 Tavastia
9 Åland
10 Lapland

1940-1941
1 Turku and Pori
2 Uusimaa
3 Oulu
4 Mikkeli
5 Vaasa
6 Kuopio
7 Viipuri
8 Tavastia
9 Åland
10 Lapland

1944-1945
1 Turku and Pori
2 Uusimaa
3 Oulu
4 Mikkeli
5 Vaasa
6 Kuopio
7 Viipuri
8 Tavastia
9 Åland
10 Lapland

1945-1947
1 Turku and Pori
2 Uusimaa
3 Oulu
4 Mikkeli
5 Vaasa
6 Kuopio
7 Kymi
8 Tavastia
9 Åland
10 Lapland

1947-1960
1 Turku and Pori
2 Uusimaa
3 Oulu
4 Mikkeli
5 Vaasa
6 Kuopio
7 Kymi
8 Tavastia
9 Åland
10 Lapland

1960-1997
1 Turku and Pori
2 Uusimaa
3 Oulu
4 Mikkeli
5 Vaasa
6 Kuopio
7 Kymi
8 Tavastia
9 Åland
10 Lapland
11 Central Finland
12 Northern Karelia

1997-2009
1 Western Finland
2 Southern Finland
3 Oulu
4 Eastern Finland
5 Åland
6 Lapland

== See also ==
- ISO 3166-2:FI
- NUTS statistical regions of Finland
- Provincial Governors of Finland
- Subdivisions of the Nordic countries
- Governorates of the Russian Empire
- Baltic governorates
