= Kaisa Juuso =

Finnish politician (born 1960)

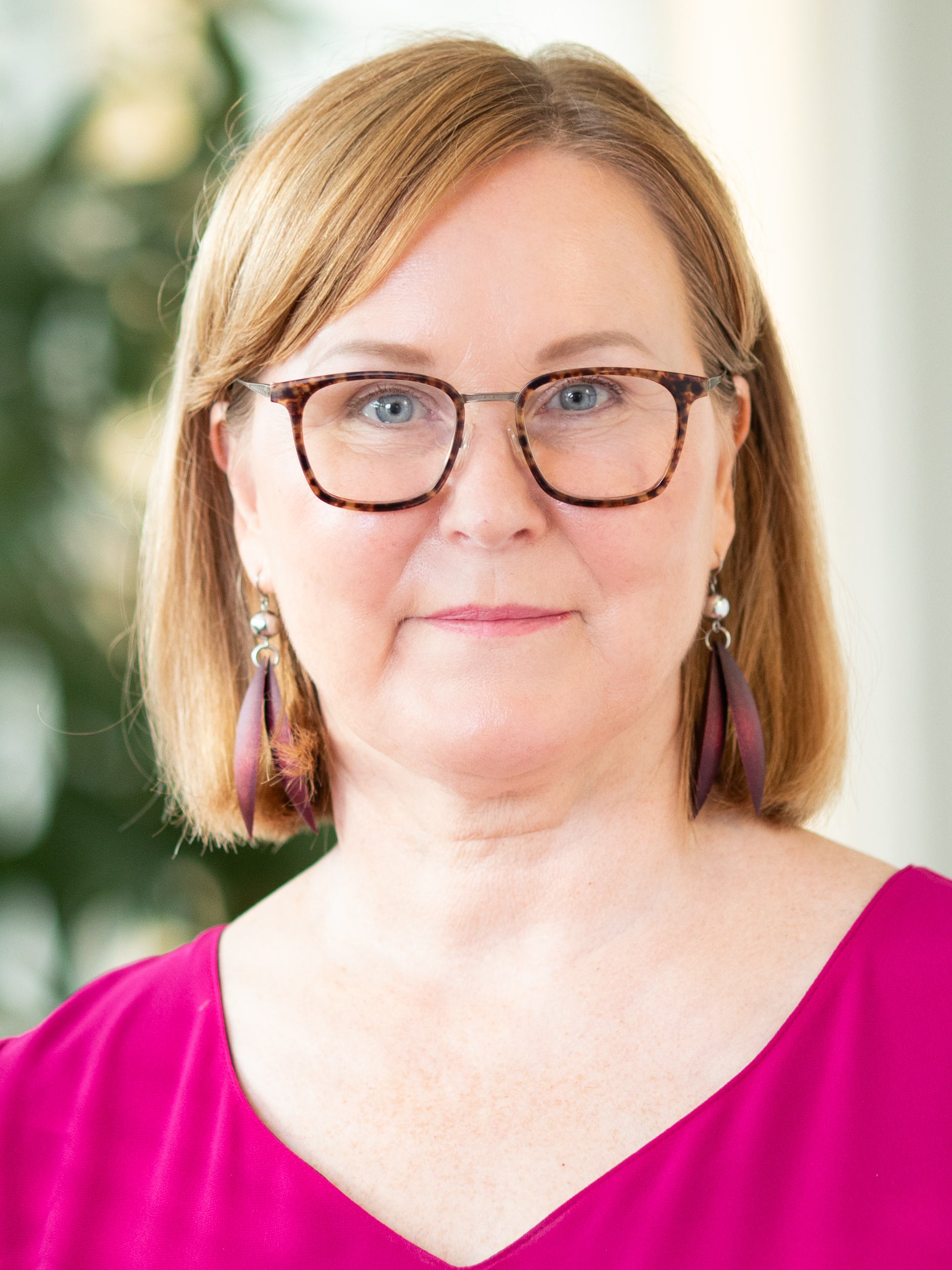
- Juuso in 2023

Minister of Social Affairs and Health
- In office 20 June 2023 – 20 February 2026
- Prime Minister: Petteri Orpo
- Preceded by: Hanna Sarkkinen
- Succeeded by: Wille Rydman

Member of Parliament for Lapland
- Incumbent
- Assumed office 17 April 2019

Personal details
- Born: 23 September 1960 (age 65) Alatornio, Lapland, Finland
- Party: Finns Party

Kaisa Juuso (born 23 September 1960) is a Finnish politician currently serving in the Parliament of Finland for the Finns Party at the Lapland constituency. She is originally from the Arpela village of the former Alatornio municipality.

In June 2023, Juuso was appointed Minister of Social Affairs and Health in the Orpo Cabinet.
