= Regional State Administrative Agency for Northern Finland =

Government agency of Finland

The Regional State Administrative Agency for Northern Finland (Finnish: Pohjois-Suomen aluehallintovirasto) was one of the six Regional State Administrative Agencies. The responsibility area of the agency consisted of two regions, nine sub-regions and 43 municipalities.

The operations of the Regional State Administrative Agencies ended on 31 December 2025, when the Finnish Supervisory Agency (Lupa- ja valvontavirasto, LVV) was established on 1 January 2026.

== Regions ==
North Ostrobothnia	North Ostrobothnia (Pohjois-Pohjanmaa/Norra Österbotten)
Kainuu	Kainuu (Kainuu/Kajanaland)
