= Regional State Administrative Agency for Eastern Finland =

Government agency of Finland

The Regional State Administrative Agency for Eastern Finland (Finnish: Itä-Suomen aluehallintovirasto) was one of the six Regional State Administrative Agencies. Its administrative area consisted of three regions, 14 districts and 65 municipalities.

The operations of the Regional State Administrative Agencies ended on 31 December 2025, when the Finnish Supervisory Agency (Lupa- ja valvontavirasto, LVV) was established on 1 January 2026.

== Regions ==
North Karelia	North Karelia (Pohjois-Karjala/Norra Karelen)
North Savo	North Savo (Pohjois-Savo/Norra Savolax)
South Savo	South Savo (Etelä-Savo/Södra Savolax)
