= Regional State Administrative Agency for Southern Finland =

Government agency of Finland

The Regional State Administrative Agency for Southern Finland (Finnish: Etelä-Suomen aluehallintovirasto) was one of the six Regional State Administrative Agencies. Its administrative area consisted of five regions, 16 sub-regions, and 88 municipalities.

The operations of the Regional State Administrative Agencies ended on 31 December 2025, when the Finnish Supervisory Agency (Lupa- ja valvontavirasto, LVV) was established on 1 January 2026.

== Regions ==
South Karelia	South Karelia (Etelä-Karjala/Södra Karelen)
Päijät-Häme	Päijät-Häme (Päijät-Häme/Päijänne Tavastland)
Kanta-Häme	Kanta-Häme (Kanta-Häme/Egentliga Tavastland)
Uusimaa	Uusimaa (Uusimaa/Nyland)
Kymenlaakso	Kymenlaakso (Kymenlaakso/Kymmenedalen)
