= Tapio Voionmaa =

Finnish diplomat (1896–1960)

Olavi Tapio Voionmaa (until 1906 Wallin; 9 June 1896, in Helsinki – 6 October 1960) was a Finnish diplomat.

Voionmaa's parents were Professor Väinö Voionmaa and Ilma Maria Alin. He graduated in 1914 and graduated as a bachelor and master of philosophy in 1918.

Voionmaa served as Assistant to the Embassy of Finland in London from 1921 to 1922, as a member of the International Labor Office in 1922-1937 and as a member of the Financial and Economic Department of the League of Nations Secretariat in 1929-1937.

Voionmaa was head of the Economic Policy Department of the Ministry for Foreign Affairs from 1937 to 1938 and the Ministry's Permanent Secretary from 1938 to 1941 and 1946-1950.

He was an Envoy in Switzerland from 1941 to 1946 and Belgium and Luxembourg from 1950 to 1957. Voionmaa was the Finnish Ambassador of Spain in 1957-1960 and at the same time also to the Holy See from 1956 to 1960. Voionmaa was also chaired by the International Association for Alcohol Resistance in 1946-1960.

Voionmaa wrote the book International Social Policy (1926) and published studies in the series Studies and Reports of the International Labour Office and the Publications of the Economic Intelligence Service, League of Nations 1923-1937.

Tapio Voionmaa was married in 1923 to Madeleine Morel.
