= List of Finnish regions by GDP =

This is a list of Finnish regions by GDP and GDP per capita.

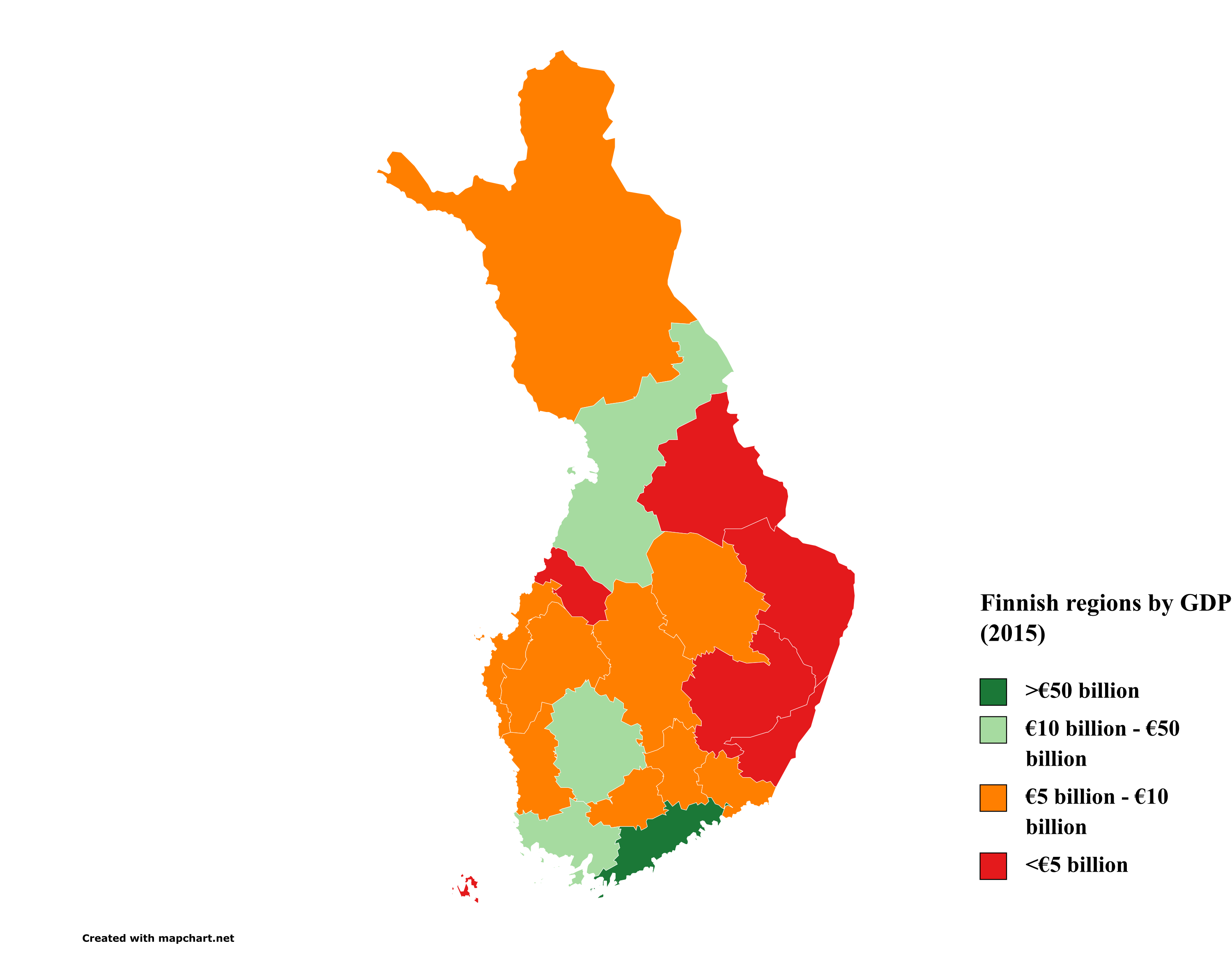
Finnish regions by GDP (2015)

== List of regions by GDP ==
Regions by GDP in 2021 according to data by the OECD.

| Rank | Region | GDP in mil EUR | GDP in mil USD (PPP) |
|---|---|---|---|
| 1 | Helsinki-Uusimaa | 98,663 | 126,038 |
| 2 | Pirkanmaa | 22,104 | 28,237 |
| 3 | Southwest Finland | 20,009 | 25,560 |
| 4 | North Ostrobothnia | 16,323 | 20,851 |
| 5 | Central Finland | 10,416 | 13,306 |
| 6 | North Savo | 9,404 | 12,013 |
| 7 | Satakunta | 8,531 | 10,898 |
| 8 | Ostrobothnia | 7,980 | 10,194 |
| 9 | Kymenlaakso | 7,221 | 9,224 |
| 10 | Lapland | 7,066 | 9,027 |
| 11 | Päijät-Häme | 6,993 | 8,933 |
| 12 | Southern Ostrobothnia | 6,901 | 8,816 |
| 13 | Kanta-Häme | 6,532 | 8,345 |
| 14 | North Karelia | 5,743 | 7,336 |
| 15 | South Karelia | 5,298 | 6,768 |
| 16 | South Savo | 4,818 | 6,154 |
| 17 | Central Ostrobothnia | 2,652 | 3,388 |
| 18 | Kainuu | 2,579 | 3,295 |
| 19 | Åland | 1,344 | 1,717 |
| | Finland | 250 577 | 320 100 |

== List of regions by GDP per capita ==
Counties by GDP per capita in 2021 according to data by the OECD.

| Rank | Region | GDP per capita in EUR | GDP per capita in USD (PPP) |
|---|---|---|---|
| 1 | Helsinki-Uusimaa | 57,741 | 73,762 |
| 2 | Åland | 44,435 | 56,764 |
| 3 | Ostrobothnia | 44,233 | 56,506 |
| 4 | Kymenlaakso | 42,806 | 54,682 |
| 5 | Pirkanmaa | 42,264 | 53,990 |
| 6 | South Karelia | 41,879 | 53,498 |
| 7 | Southwest Finland | 41,474 | 52,980 |
| 8 | Lapland | 40,018 | 51,121 |
| 9 | Satakunta | 39,708 | 50,725 |
| 10 | North Ostrobothnia | 39,358 | 50,278 |
| 11 | Central Ostrobothnia | 39,032 | 49,861 |
| 12 | North Savo | 38,594 | 49,301 |
| 13 | Kanta-Häme | 38,336 | 48,972 |
| 14 | Central Finland | 37,902 | 48,418 |
| 15 | Southern Ostrobothnia | 36,811 | 47,024 |
| 16 | Kainuu | 36,097 | 46,112 |
| 17 | North Karelia | 35,838 | 45,781 |
| 18 | Päijät-Häme | 35,163 | 44,919 |
| 19 | South Savo | 34,407 | 43,953 |
| | Finland | 45 238 | 57 789 |
