= Hannele Voionmaa =

Finnish diplomat (1953–2016)

Greta Hannele Voionmaa (née Kaaja; 28 December 1953 – 1 January 2016) was a Finnish diplomat. She was the Ambassador of Finland to Algeria from 2008 to 2011 when the Finnish mission was reinstated to the embassy headed by an ambassador. After returning from Algeria in the autumn of 2015, she started as a Foreign Policy Adviser to the Speaker of Parliament. She died on 1 January 2016

Voionmaa joined the Ministry of Foreign Affairs in 1981.

Voionmaa became to Ambassador of Finland to Algeria at the Ministry for Foreign Affairs of the Americas and Asia, which has since 2008 launched the Dialogues of the Civilization Ministry. Voionmaa served in the Press and Culture Department and the Protocol Department until 2001 when she moved to work at the Ministry of Foreign Affairs' Political Department in the Security Policy and Crisis Management Unit. At the Finnish Embassy in Paris, he has been on two occasions; first, she was a cultural civil servant, with the task of preparing the establishment of the Finnish Institute of Paris and reiterating as a foreign and security policy adviser both during Finnish and French EU Presidencies.
