= Regional State Administrative Agency =

Regional organs of Finland

The Regional State Administrative Agencies (Finnish: aluehallintovirasto, avi, pl. aluehallintovirastot, Swedish: regionförvaltningsverk) were a set of top-level regional organs of the state of Finland, mainly in charge of basic public services and legal permits. Established in 2010, six agencies took over some of the tasks of the earlier provinces of Finland, which were abolished at the end of 2009. A seventh agency in the autonomous area Åland is named the State Department of Åland.

The agencies themselves did not constitute a subdivision of Finland (ISO 3166-2:FI); instead, the first-level subdivisions were and still are the regions of Finland. The other important set of top-level regional state agencies were the Centres for Economic Development, Transport and the Environment (ELY-keskukset, sing. ELY-keskus).

The operations of the Regional State Administrative Agencies ended on 31 December 2025, when the Finnish Supervisory Agency (Lupa- ja valvontavirasto, LVV) was established on 1 January 2026.

== Agencies and their regions ==
Administrative agencies of Finland	Regional office	Secondary offices
Regional State Administrative Agency for Southern Finland; Uusimaa, Kanta-Häme, Päijät-Häme, Kymenlaakso, South Karelia	Hämeenlinna	Helsinki, Kouvola
Regional State Administrative Agency for Southwestern Finland; Southwest Finland, Satakunta	Turku	Pori
Regional State Administrative Agency for Western and Inland Finland; Pirkanmaa, Central Finland, South Ostrobothnia, Central Ostrobothnia, Ostrobothnia	Vaasa	Tampere, Jyväskylä
Regional State Administrative Agency for Eastern Finland; South Savo, North Savo, North Karelia	Mikkeli	Kuopio, Joensuu
Regional State Administrative Agency for Northern Finland; North Ostrobothnia, Kainuu	Oulu	
Regional State Administrative Agency for Lapland; Lapland	Rovaniemi	
State Department of Åland; Åland	Mariehamn	

== See also ==
- ISO 3166-2:FI
- Government Offices for the English Regions
