= Regional State Administrative Agency for Western and Inland Finland =

Government agency of Finland

The Regional State Administrative Agency for Western and Inland Finland (Finnish: Länsi- ja Sisä-Suomen aluehallintovirasto) was one of the six Regional State Administrative Agencies in Finland. The responsibility area of the agency was composed of five regions, 25 districts and 115 municipalities.

The operations of the Regional State Administrative Agencies ended on 31 December 2025, when the Finnish Supervisory Agency (Lupa- ja valvontavirasto, LVV) was established on 1 January 2026.

== Regions ==
	South Ostrobothnia (Etelä-Pohjanmaa/ Södra Österbotten)
Ostrobothnia	Ostrobothnia (Pohjanmaa/ Österbotten)
Pirkanmaa	Pirkanmaa (Pirkanmaa/ Birkaland)
	Central Ostrobothnia (Keski-Pohjanmaa/ Mellersta Österbotten)
Central Finland	Central Finland (Keski-Suomi/ Mellersta Finland)
