= Centre for Economic Development, Transport and the Environment =

Government agency of Finland

Agency overview
- Website: www.ely-keskus.fi

The Centres for Economic Development, Transport and the Environment (ELY Centres, Finnish: elinkeino-, liikenne- ja ympäristökeskukset, ELY-keskukset; Swedish: Närings-, trafik- och miljöcentralerna, NTM-centralerna) were local offices of the Finnish government placed in each of the regions of Finland. Established in 2010, Finland had a total of 15 ELY Centres, which were tasked with promoting regional competitiveness, well-being and sustainable development and curbing climate change. They were distinct from the Regional State Administrative Agencies, which covered multiple regions and were tasked with law enforcement and related duties instead.

ELY Centres had three areas of responsibility:

- Business and industry, labour force, competence and cultural activities
- Environment and natural resources
- Transport and infrastructure

The ELY Centres steered and supervised the activities of the Employment and Economic Development Offices (TE Offices, Finnish: työ- ja elinkeinotoimistot), which had similar tasks as Job Centres have in the UK. Not all ELY Centres dealt with all three areas of responsibility, as they could also manage duties on each other's behalf.

The operations of the ELY Centres ended on 31 December 2025, after which the Economic Development Centres (Finnish: elinvoimakeskukset) and the Finnish Supervisory Agency (Lupa- ja valvontavirasto, LVV) were established on 1 January 2026 to continue their operations.
