= Uuno Hannula =

Finnish journalist and politician (1891–1963)

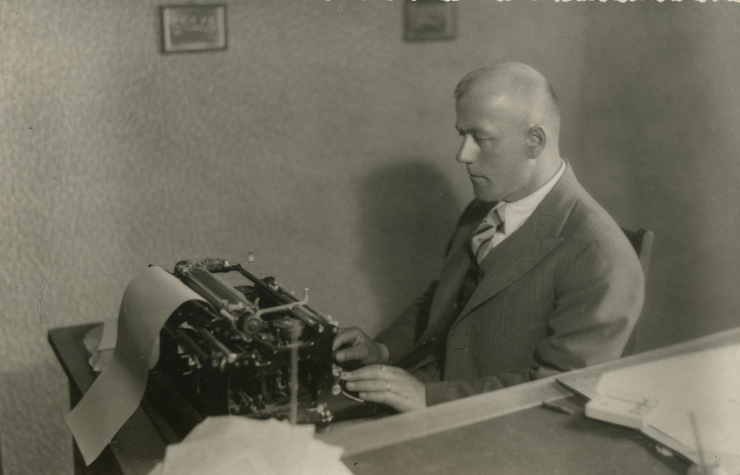
Uuno Hannula

Uuno Yrjö Hannula (22 October 1891 – 26 July 1963) was a Finnish journalist and politician, born in Alatornio. He was a member of the Parliament of Finland from 1927 to 1944, representing the Agrarian League. He served as Minister of Education from 12 March 1937 to 27 March 1940. He was the governor of Lapland Province from 1944 to 1958. He was a presidential elector in the 1937, 1940 and 1943 presidential elections.
