= Regional State Administrative Agency for Southwestern Finland =

Government agency of Finland

The Regional State Administrative Agency for Southwestern Finland (Finnish: Lounais-Suomen aluehallintovirasto) was one of the six Regional State Administrative Agencies. The administrative area of the agency consisted of two regions, 9 districts and 77 municipalities.

The operations of the Regional State Administrative Agencies ended on 31 December 2025, when the Finnish Supervisory Agency (Lupa- ja valvontavirasto, LVV) was established on 1 January 2026.

== Regions ==
Satakunta (Satakunta/ Satakunta)
Southwest Finland (Varsinais-Suomi/ Egentliga Finland)
