= Alatornio =

Alatornio Alatornio – Nedertorneå
- Former municipality
- Alatornion kunta Nedertorneå kommun
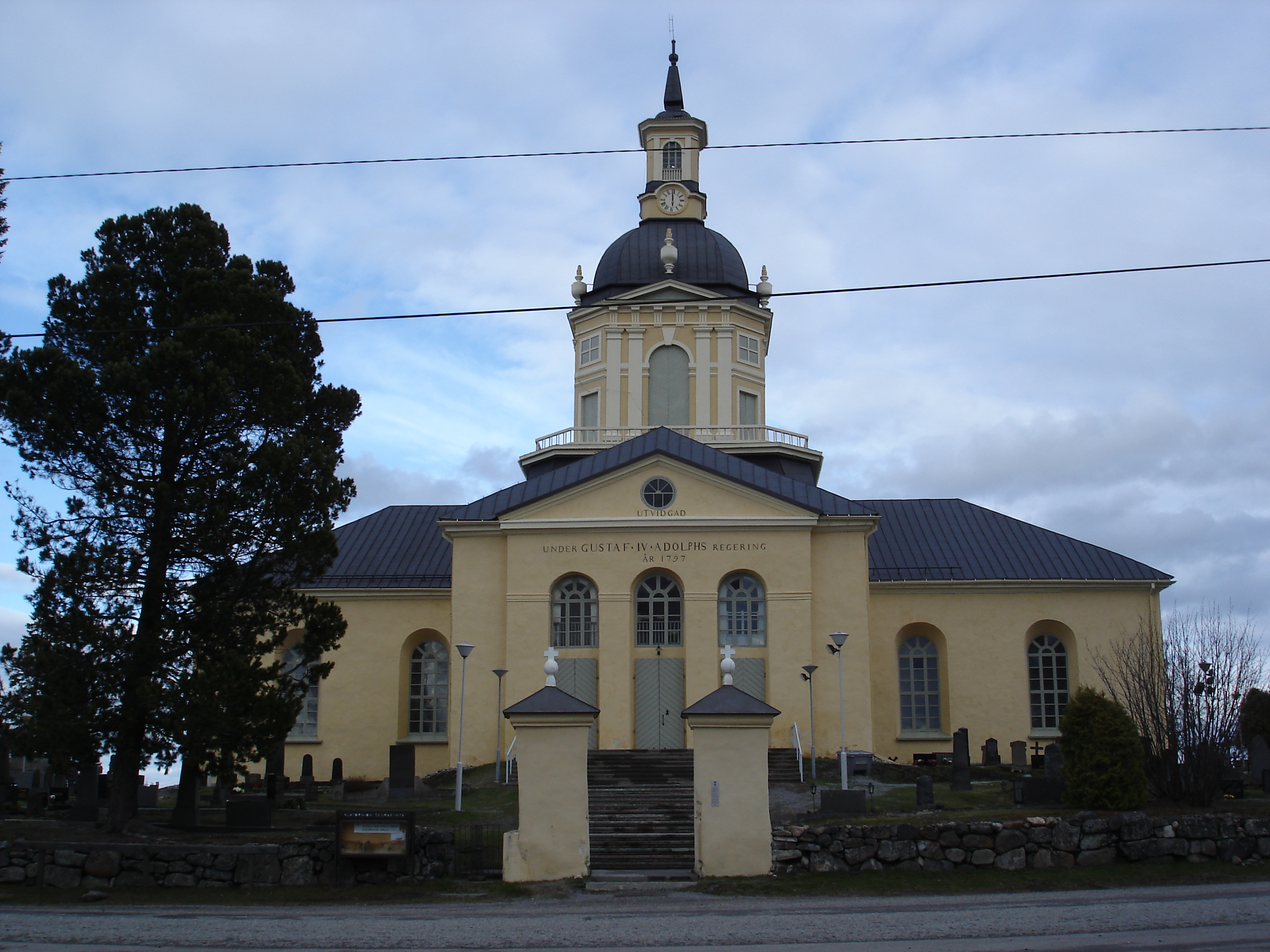
- Alatornio Church (1797)

- Coat of arms

- Location of Alatornio in Finland
- Coordinates: 65°49′33″N 024°10′04″E
- Country: Finland
- Region: Lapland
- Consolidated: 1973

Area
  - Land: 927.4 km^{2} (358.1 sq mi)

Population (1970)
  - Total: 8,575
  - Density: 9.246/km^{2} (23.95/sq mi)
- Time zone: UTC+2 (EET)
  - Summer (DST): UTC+3 (EEST)

Alatornio (Swedish: Nedertorneå) is a former municipality in the province of Lapland, Finland. It was annexed with Tornio in 1973. In 1970, Alatornio had a population of 8,575 people.

Alatornio Church was built in 1797 in the neoclassical style, replacing older buildings which have existed since at least the 14th century. Remnants of a medieval church built in the 15th century can be seen opposite the main entrance today. The church is protected as part of a UNESCO World Heritage Site.

== Notable people ==
- Petter Abram Herajärvi (1830–1885), satirical poet, known as the "Preacher of Limeland"
- Kaisa Juuso (born 1960), politician
- Ville Pörhölä (1897–1964), shot putter, olympic gold medalist

== See also ==
- Arpela
