= Väinö Voionmaa =

Finnish professor, diplomat and politician

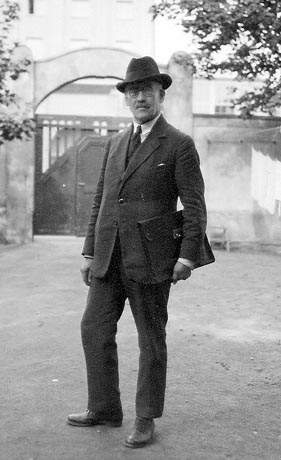
Väinö Voionmaa

Kaarle Väinö Voionmaa (to 1906 Wallin) (12 February 1869 in Jyväskylä – 24 May 1947 in Helsinki) was a Finnish professor, diplomat, member of the parliament of Finland, senator, minister and chancellor. He also was one of the most influential politicians during the early times of independent Republic of Finland. He was a Social Democrat.

As an academic, Voionmaa contributed to introduce economic and geographic perspectives into Finnish history writings. He has studied the medieval times and the rise of the modern urban industrial society. He was also one of the founders of the School of Social Sciences in 1930 that eventually became the University of Tampere.

== Cabinet positions ==
Voionmaa was one of the senators in the Tokoi senate in 1917 before the declaration of independence. Later he served as the Minister of Foreign Affairs in the cabinet of Väinö Tanner (1926–1927). He was also the Minister of Trade and Industry in the Cajander 3rd cabinet (1937–1939), and also briefly the Minister of Foreign Affairs in 1938. Voionmaa's experience in foreign affairs grew while he was a member of the Finnish delegation to the League of Nations.

== Bibliography ==
- Voionmaa, Väinö, Yhteiskunta ja alkoholikysymys. Raittiusjärjestöjen yhteistoimikunta, 1944.
- Voionmaa, Väinö, Tampereen historia. 1932.
- Voionmaa, Väinö, Yhteiskunnallinen alkoholikysymys. WSOY 1925.
- Voionmaa, Väinö, Suomen talousmaantieto. WSOY 1922.
- Voionmaa, Väinö, Valtioelämän perusteet. Edistysseurojen kustannusosakeyhtiö, 1918.
- Voionmaa, Väinö, Suur-Suomen luonnolliset rajat, 1918

Political offices
Preceded by Emil Nestor Setälä	Foreign Minister of Finland; 1926-1927	Succeeded by Hjalmar Procopé
Preceded by Rudolf Holsti	Foreign Minister of Finland; 1938	Succeeded by Eljas Erkko
