= Juho Koivisto =

Finnish politician (1885–1975)

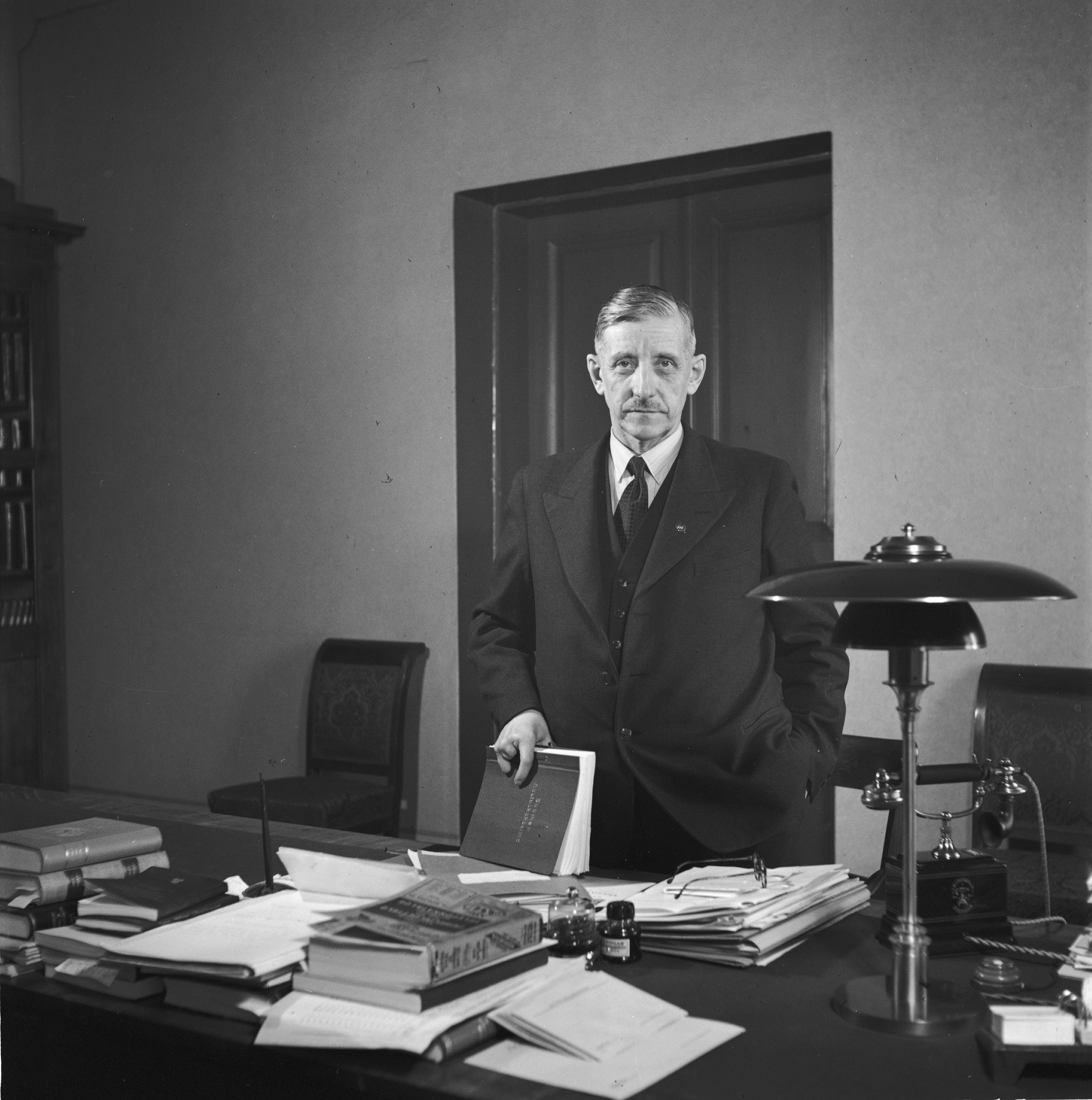
Juho Koivisto in 1941

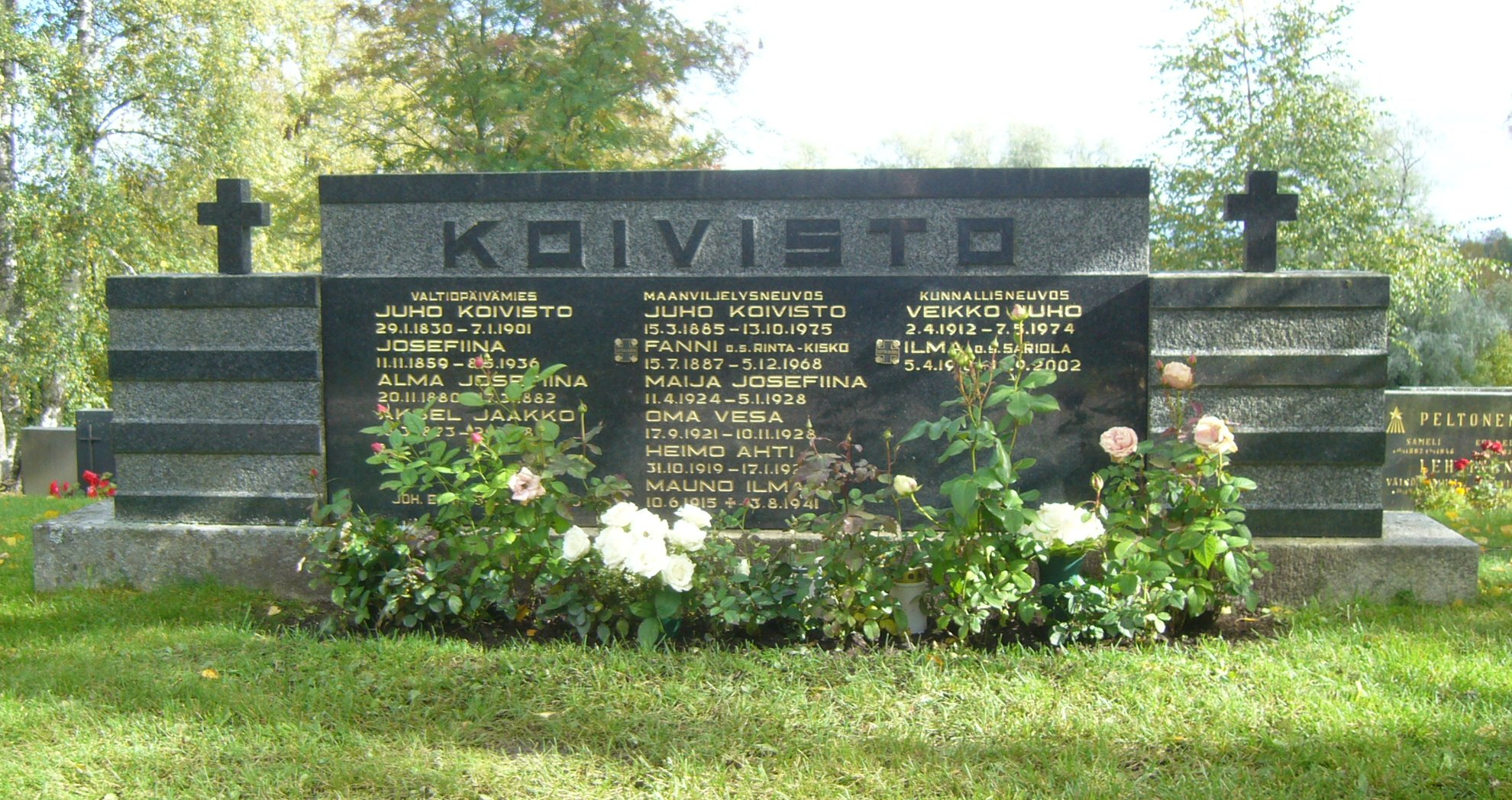
Juho Koivisto's gravestone in Kurikka cemetery, Finland

Johannes (Juho) Koivisto (15 March 1885, in Kurikka – 13 October 1975; original surname Keski-Koivisto) was a Finnish farmer and politician. He served as Deputy Minister of Agriculture from 4 July 1930 to 21 March 1931 and from 12 March 1937 to 4 January 1941 and as Deputy Minister of Finance from 4 January 1941 to 5 March 1943. He was a member of the Parliament of Finland from 1927 to 1951, representing the Agrarian League.
