= Regions of Finland =

Regions maakunta (Finnish) landskap (Swedish)
- Category: Unitary state
- Location: Finland
- Number: 19
- Populations: 30,344 (Åland) — 1,714,741 (Uusimaa)
- Areas: 1,553 km^{2} (Åland) — 92,674 km^{2} (Lapland)
- Government: Regional council
- Subdivisions: Municipality

Finland is divided into 19 regions (Finnish: maakunta; Swedish: landskap) (Note: Northern Sami: eanangoddi, Inari Sami: eennâmkodde, and Skolt Sami: mäddkåʹdd.) which are governed by regional councils that serve as forums of cooperation for the municipalities of each region. The councils are composed of delegates from the municipal councils. The main tasks of regional councils are regional planning, the development of enterprises, and education. Between 2004 and 2012, the regional council of Kainuu was elected via popular elections as part of an experimental regional administration.

In 2022, new Wellbeing services counties were established as part of a health care and social services reform. The wellbeing services counties follow the regional borders, with the exception of Uusimaa, which is split into multiple counties. They are governed by directly elected county councils.

== Åland ==
One region, Åland, has a special status and has a much higher degree of autonomy than the others, with its own Parliament and local laws, due to its unique history and the fact that the overwhelming majority of its people are Swedish-speaking. The sole language of Åland is Swedish, unlike the rest of the country where Finnish and Swedish share official status. It has its own elected head of government who carries the title of Premier and heads the Lantråd, the regional executive. Most powers that would be exercised by the Government of Finland on the mainland are instead exercised by Åland-specific authorities which execute independent policy in most areas. The Åland islanders elect a single representative to the national legislature, while the Government of Finland appoints a Governor to represent the national government on Åland. Åland is a demilitarized zone and Åland islanders are exempt from conscription.

== Representation of the state ==
In addition to inter-municipal cooperation, which is the responsibility of regional councils, there are 15 Centres for Economic Development, Transport and the Environment (Finnish: elinkeino-, liikenne- ja ympäristökeskus, abbreviated ely-keskus), which are responsible for the local administration of labour, agriculture, fisheries, forestry and entrepreneurial affairs. They are each responsible for one or more of regions of Finland, and include offices of the Ministries of Employment and the Economy, Transport and Communications and Environment. The Finnish Defence Forces regional offices are responsible for the regional defence preparations and for the administration of conscription within the region.

== List of regions ==

Flag	Coat of arms	English name	Finnish name	Swedish name	ISO	Capital	Area (km^{2})	Population (2021)	Density (per km^{2})
	Lapland	Lapland	Lappi	Lappland	FI-10	Rovaniemi	92,674	176,494	1.90
	North Ostrobothnia	North Ostrobothnia	Pohjois-Pohjanmaa	Norra Österbotten	FI-14	Oulu	36,815	415,603	11.29
Kainuu	Kainuu	Kainuu	Kainuu	Kajanaland	FI-05	Kajaani	20,197	71,255	3.53
North Karelia	North Karelia	North Karelia	Pohjois-Karjala	Norra Karelen	FI-13	Joensuu	17,761	163,281	9.19
North Savo	North Savo	North Savo	Pohjois-Savo	Norra Savolax	FI-15	Kuopio	16,768	248,363	14.81
South Savo	South Savo	South Savo	Etelä-Savo	Södra Savolax	FI-04	Mikkeli	14,257	131,688	9.24
	South Karelia	South Karelia	Etelä-Karjala	Södra Karelen	FI-02	Lappeenranta	5,327	126,107	23.67
Central Finland	Central Finland	Central Finland	Keski-Suomi	Mellersta Finland	FI-08	Jyväskylä	16,703	272,683	16.33
South Ostrobothnia	South Ostrobothnia	South Ostrobothnia	Etelä-Pohjanmaa	Södra Österbotten	FI-03	Seinäjoki	13,444	191,762	14.26
	Ostrobothnia	Ostrobothnia	Pohjanmaa	Österbotten	FI-12	Vaasa	7,753	176,041	22.71
Central Ostrobothnia	Central Ostrobothnia	Central Ostrobothnia	Keski-Pohjanmaa	Mellersta Österbotten	FI-07	Kokkola	5,020	67,915	13.53
Pirkanmaa	Pirkanmaa	Pirkanmaa	Pirkanmaa	Birkaland	FI-11	Tampere	12,585	527,478	41.91
Satakunta	Satakunta	Satakunta	Satakunta	Satakunta	FI-17	Pori	7,820	214,281	27.40
Päijät-Häme	Päijät-Häme	Päijät-Häme	Päijät-Häme	Päijänne-Tavastland	FI-16	Lahti	5,125	205,124	40.02
Kanta-Häme	Kanta-Häme	Kanta-Häme	Kanta-Häme	Egentliga Tavastland	FI-06	Hämeenlinna	5,199	170,213	32.74
	Kymenlaakso	Kymenlaakso	Kymenlaakso	Kymmenedalen	FI-09	Kotka and Kouvola (Note: Kymenlaakso is the only region with two capitals, of which Kotka is the official regional centre and Kouvola is the administrative one.)	5,149	161,391	31.34
Uusimaa	Uusimaa	Uusimaa	Uusimaa	Nyland	FI-18	Helsinki	9,097	1,714,741	188.50
	Southwest Finland	Southwest Finland	Varsinais-Suomi	Egentliga Finland	FI-19	Turku	10,663	483,477	45.34
Åland	Åland	Åland	Ahvenanmaa	Åland	AX and FI-01	Mariehamn	1,553	30,344	19.54

=== Former region ===
Regions of Finland in 2000.

Coat of arms	Name	Official English name	Finnish name	Swedish name	Capital	Dissolution (date)
	Eastern Uusimaa	Itä-Uusimaa	Itä-Uusimaa	Östra Nyland	Porvoo	1 January 2011

=== Regional border changes ===
Border changes between the regions:

==== 1997 ====
- Kiikoinen transferred from Pirkanmaa to Satakunta.

==== 2001 ====
- Kuorevesi transferred from Pirkanmaa to Central Finland by merging with Jämsä.

==== 2002 ====
- Kangaslampi transferred from South Savo to North Savo.

==== 2005 ====
- Punkalaidun transferred from Satakunta to Pirkanmaa.

==== 2007 ====
- Längelmäki merged with Orivesi in Pirkanmaa and Jämsä in Central Finland.

==== 2010 ====
- Himanka transferred from Central Ostrobothnia to North Ostrobothnia by merging with Kalajoki.
- Part of Ruotsinpyhtää in Eastern Uusimaa transferred to Pyhtää in Kymenlaakso.

==== 2013 ====
- Kiikoinen transferred from Satakunta to Pirkanmaa by merging with Sastamala.
- Suomenniemi transferred from South Karelia to South Savo by merging with Mikkeli.

==== 2016 ====
- Vaala transferred from Kainuu to North Ostrobothnia.

==== 2021 ====
- Heinävesi transferred from South Savo to North Karelia.
- Iitti transferred from Kymenlaakso to Päijät-Häme.
- Isokyrö transferred from Ostrobothnia to South Ostrobothnia.
- Joroinen transferred from South Savo to North Savo.
- Kuhmoinen transferred from Central Finland to Pirkanmaa.

== See also ==
- Municipalities of Lapland
- Regions of Northern Finland
- Regions of Eastern Finland
- Regions of Western and Central Finland
- Regions of South-Western Finland
- Regions of Southern Finland
- Municipalities of Åland
- County Councils of Sweden
- Household pennants of Finland
- ISO 3166-2:FI
- Regional State Administrative Agency
- List of Finnish regions by GDP
