= 123rd Rifle Division =

123rd Rifle Division (September 1939 – January 1946)
- Active: 1939–1946
- Country: Soviet Union
- Branch: Red Army (1939-46)
- Type: Infantry
- Size: Division
- Engagements: Winter War; Battle of Summa; Continuation War; Finnish invasion of the Karelian Isthmus; Battle of Porlampi; Siege of Leningrad; Operation Iskra; Mga offensive Leningrad–Novgorod offensive Novgorod–Luga offensive Madona offensive Baltic offensive Riga offensive (1944); Courland Pocket
- Decorations: Order of Lenin
- Battle honours: Luga

Commanders
- Notable commanders: Col. Viktor Fyodorovich Stenshinskii; Col. Philipp Fyodorovich Alyabushev; Col. Evgenii Efimovich Tsukanov; Col. Yakov Afanasevich Panichkin; Maj. Gen. Aleksandr Pavlovich Ivanov; Col. Tikhon Savelevich Shumskii

The 123rd Rifle Division was formed as an infantry division of the Red Army in September 1939, in the Kalinin Military District, based on the shtat (table of organization and equipment) of that month. It was barely formed when it was moved to the Leningrad Military District, joining the 7th Army on the Karelian Isthmus just before the start of the invasion of Finland on November 30. Along with the remainder of the Red Army units facing the Mannerheim Line it fared poorly in the attacks beginning on December 17 and was driven back with heavy losses. The remnants of the 123rd were pulled back behind the lines, fleshed out with numerous replacements, and given extensive training against mock-ups of the Finnish fortifications they would again face. The division returned to battle in February 1940 and succeeded in breaking the Line, for which it was awarded the Order of Lenin, the only division to be decorated before the ceasefire. Afterward it became part of 23rd Army, and remained on the Finnish border until after the start of the Continuation War in July 1941. During late August it was forced to conduct a costly fighting withdrawal from the Viipuri area south to the pre-Winter War Finnish-Soviet border, where it would remain defending besieged Leningrad until late 1942. It left 23rd Army in December and moved east to join 67th Army for the offensive that restored land communications with the city in January 1943, making the first contact with forces of 2nd Shock Army attacking from outside. From July into September the 123rd took part in two offensives that finally liberated Sinyavino, but failed to take the objective of Mga. After brief reassignments to 2nd Shock and 42nd Armies it was back in 67th Army at the start of the offensive that finally drove Army Group North away from Leningrad, and in February it was awarded a battle honor. From there it advanced to the Estonian border, being assigned to 59th Army before going into reserve. It returned to the front in August again in 42nd Army, now part of 2nd Baltic Front, and advanced into Latvia into December as the remnants of Army Group North were bottled up in the Courland Pocket. It spent early 1945 in this containment operation, mostly as part of 1st Shock Army, but in April it returned to 67th Army in Leningrad Front, where it ended the war. After the peace it was sent to Ukraine, where it was disbanded in January 1946.

== Formation ==
The division was formed at Vyshny Volochyok in the Kalinin Military District in September 1939, based on the 146th Rifle Regiment of the 49th Rifle Division. Before the end of the month it was assigned to 8th Army, on the border between the USSR and Estonia, but was soon redirected to the Leningrad Military District, which was under command of Komandarm 2nd rank K. A. Meretskov. Col. Viktor Fyodorovich Stenshinskii was not appointed to command until November, just weeks before the start of the invasion of Finland on November 30. The major units of the 123rd were the 245th, 255th, and 272nd Rifle Regiments, plus the 323rd Artillery Regiment. It was assigned to the 19th Rifle Corps of 7th Army, which deployed on the Karelian Isthmus, initially under command of Komandarm 2nd rank V. F. Yakovlev with, eventually, 14 rifle divisions, three tank brigades, and a mechanized corps. The Army was tasked with breaking through the Mannerheim Line and reaching Viipuri before sweeping west to Helsinki.

== Winter War ==
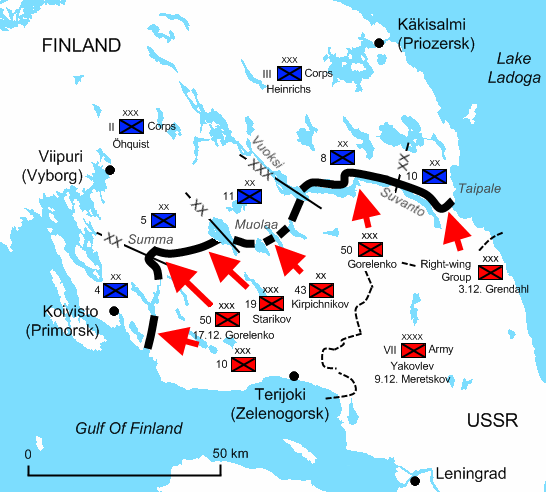
7th Army advance to December 6. Note position of 19th Rifle Corps.

The invasion began at 0700 hours on November 30 with an opening bombardment by 600 guns on the isthmus frontier. The infantry and tanks began to advance at 0730. While the Finns were expecting an attack, its weight and scope "exceeded our worst apprehensions", according to the Finnish commander-in-chief, Marshal C. G. E. Mannerheim. The Finns fell back, more quickly than planned due to Soviet tanks, until 7th Army halted just short of the Mannerheim Line on December 6. For the next ten days the front went quiet, giving the Finns a respite to regroup. Meretskov took direct command of 7th Army from Yakovlev on December 9.

=== Battle of Summa ===
19th Corps faced the center of the Mannerheim Line in the Summa sector, defended by the Finnish 5th Infantry Division. The first large assault on the sector began at 1000 hours on December 17, following five hours of artillery fire and strikes by up to 200 aircraft. The attack was on two axes: on the left against Summa itself; and on the right along the Lähde Road, 2km to the northeast. Lähde itself, an important road junction, was several kilometres behind the line. Soviet sappers led the push, blowing up antitank boulders and wire entanglements, and were followed by 50 tanks in an unsupported wedge formation; coordination between the infantry and armor was almost non-existent. The 123rd was in the Corps' second echelon and penetrated the Line near Hill 65.5 ("Poppius"), but was cut off by bypassed Finnish units and forced to break out, at the cost of some 1,500 killed and wounded.

A heavier strike against the Lähde positions began the next day, with 86 tanks backed by heavy artillery and air attacks. Finnish artillery knocked out 10 vehicles while still behind the line, and another 15 were disabled in close combat. The infantry failed to pass the line of boulders. On December 19 the "Poppius" bunker, a major fortified complex, was battered by close-range tank fire so that many of its steel embrasures were jammed. Overrun by infantry, it held out for 48 hours until a Finnish counterattack freed the ground around the position. 19th Corps was now low on ammunition and supplies, and had suffered enormous casualties. The fighting died out by December 22. The 123rd had lost most of its combat personnel.

==== Second phase ====
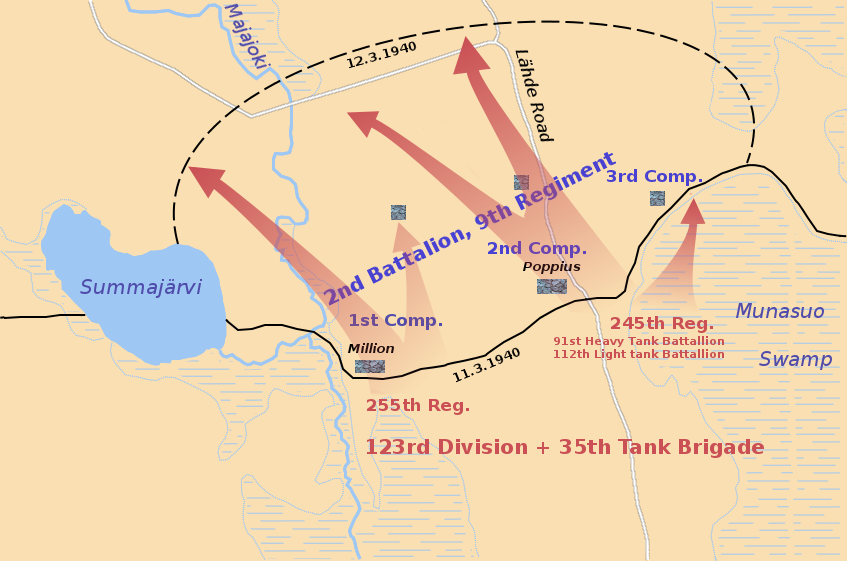
Lähde Road battle. Note the date lines should be February (02), not March (03).

At about this time Col. Philipp Fyodorovich Alyabushev was brought in from command of the 14th Rifle Division to take over from Colonel Stenshinskii. In addition, on January 7, 1940, Komandarm 1st rank S. K. Timoshenko took command of Northwestern Front (former Leningrad Military District), with Komkor G. K. Zhukov as his chief of staff. The 13th Army was created to take over the eastern end of the line. As part of their reform program the 123rd and the 35th Tank Brigade were pulled behind the front lines for replenishment and intensive training. Finnish fortifications, particularly the "Poppius" and the nearby "Million" complex, were reproduced on similar terrain. For the second phase of the offensive about 75 percent of Meretskov's 7th Army, altogether nine rifle divisions, five tank brigades, a machine gun division, and 50 guns per kilometre, would be concentrated on a 16km sector of the line from Summa to Lähde Road to Munasuo Swamp.

The planned tactical approach was called "gnawing through". The Line would be pierced with an armored wedge, now with infantry support, and this would be systematically expanded with waves of fresh troops and tanks until the defense collapsed. The Finns were known to be stretched to the limit, and such a breakthrough in the Viipuri gateway sector would force the abandonment of the entire Mannerheim Line. The 123rd and 35th Tanks would form the tip of the wedge. Intensive reconnaissance, previously neglected, discovered the positions of about 75 percent of the front line fortifications. Some patrols even returned samples of the concrete for analysis. The assault detachments of the division carried out three full-scale rehearsals against the mock fortifications, including actual demolitions, as well as refining armor and artillery cooperation and support. The tanks were given limited but realistic objectives. Several other divisions were given similar intensive training.

Timoshenko had thoroughly reorganized the artillery, now consisting of some 2,800 pieces of 76.2mm calibre up to 280mm. The latest radios would accompany the leading units to adjust fire, and a total of 108 guns would support the 123rd, most from Corps and Army sources. Many would be used in a direct fire role against "Million" and "Poppius"; a 152mm piece had been placed just 500m from the embrasures of the latter under cover of diversionary fire, while a 280mm gun was available against the former. Altogether, 300,000 shells would be fired in the first 24 hours, the heaviest bombardment since Verdun. Timoshenko's plan was to gradually escalate the usual artillery and airstrikes against the Line on February 1, accompanied by strong local ground attacks, for 10 days, before going over to the general offensive on February 11.

On February 10 the preparations widened across the entire front. A few hours before dawn the next day the 2nd Battalion of the 9th Regiment of the 5th Infantry Division relieved the battalion that had been defending the Lähde Road sector since January. Its 1st Company was assigned to "Million", the 2nd was in and around "Poppius", while the 3rd was on the left flank north of Munasuo. The battalion was significantly under strength, with some 400 effectives, and had little time to familiarize itself with the position. It was composed of Swedish-speaking Finns, which introduced a complication in communications. The two main strongpoints were backed by three more concrete bunkers, but they were 20 years old and had been damaged by shellfire. The morning temperature was -22°C with fog. The 123rd was tasked with eliminating both bunker complexes, and as Summa had proven so tough Lähde would be the sector of Meretskov's main thrust. Once the division pushed through the support line, those three bunkers about 1,000m to the rear, it would strike toward the road junction, which would force the Finns to retreat or suffer heavy casualties in counterattacks.

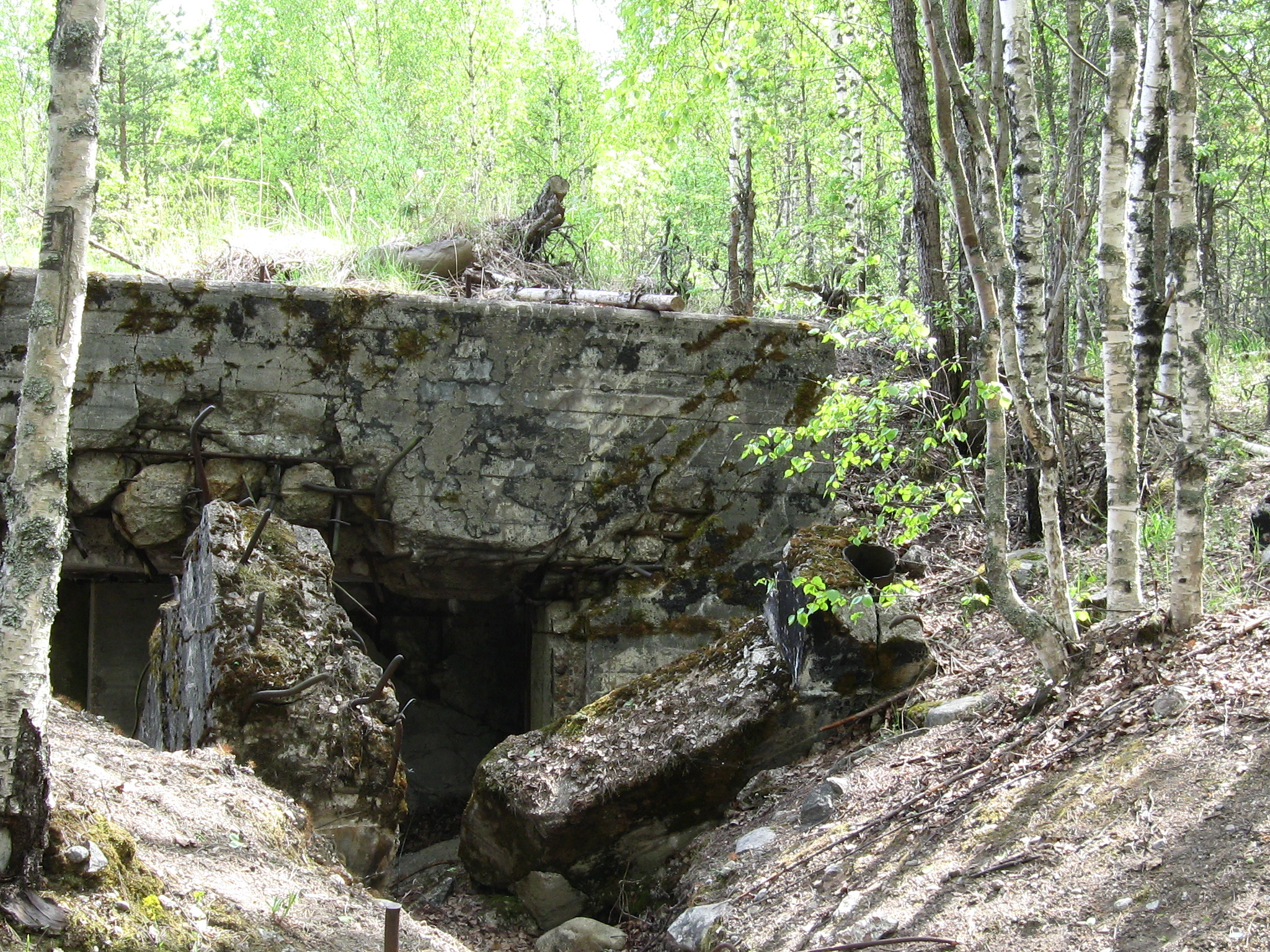
"Poppius" (Hill 65.5) long after the War

The assault troops were issued a ration of vodka at dawn, and by 0800 hours both the 123rd and the 35th Tanks were in position. This was followed by a two-and-a-half hour artillery preparation, heavier than previously seen. The heavy guns sited for direct fire tore large chunks out of the concrete of "Poppius" and "Million" while also bending their armored shutters. At 1200 the entire 255th Rifle Regiment attacked the latter, while a battalion of the 245th, with two companies of tanks, went for the former. Stiff resistance at "Poppius" halted and broke the attack after 20 minutes. Alyabushev ordered another battalion forward, and the tanks showed fresh determination. Four were knocked out by shell fire but the remainder drove up to the bunker's firing ports, bringing their guns and machine guns to bear while shrugging off Finnish machine gun fire. While this had been tried before, the riflemen now protected the tanks against Molotov cocktails and grenade bundles, and the few antitank guns had been disabled by artillery fire. The garrison had no option but to evacuate the strongpoint and take up the fight from what remained of the trenches around it. The 245th had lost about 200 killed within 100m of "Poppius", but at 1230 Alyabushev and his staff saw a red banner being raised over its roof.

The Finnish 3rd Battalion at first faced only one battalion of the 245th Regiment, as the half-frozen Munasuo could not support the weight of tanks. With almost no cover along the fringes of the swamp the Soviet soldiers suffered so many casualties that survivors called the area "The Valley of Death". However, the Finnish commander, Lt. Hannu, was later forced to withdraw as a group of some 20 T-28 tanks began moving into his rear from the Lähde Road. The "Million" complex held all day against the 255th. Eventually surrounded, several times it was overrun by infantry, but each time it was cleared with grenades and sub-machine gun fire. Several men wedged their way inside, and fighting became hand-to-hand. The garrison platoon received several demands to surrender, but answered with obscenities. At 0500 hours on February 12 divisional sappers placed a 250kg block of explosive on top of a crack in the roof of the main chamber that had been caused by shellfire. The blast killed all the occupants of the chamber and left a hole some 10m wide. With just 50 men remaining the Finnish 1st Battalion continued to hold out, even getting one Bofors antitank gun back in service and knocking out several tanks as they passed. Finally, at 1200 the survivors pulled back to the support line behind Lake Summasjärvi.

By dusk the 123rd and the 35th Tanks had taken a large oval of territory right up to this support line. No attempt was made to rush this position in the fading light; the division dug in. During February 11-12 Soviet attacks on all other sectors had either failed or been forced out of their penetrations by counterattacks. Mannerheim intended to strike the Lähde Road position with the bulk of 5th Infantry, but in the event two regiments were required to hold the line. The 14th Regiment was sent in on the morning of February 13, but two battalions were pinned down by intense artillery fire, air strikes, and tank probes. The remaining two succeeded in driving the 123rd off a hill north of Summasjärvi and getting two companies across the Munasuo, but artillery forward observers were able to stall the attack with heavy fire, and the survivors pulled back to the support line. At about 1500 hours the 35th Tanks launched a supported attack in full strength, leading to a close range melee near an antitank ditch. While tank fire blew apart a reinforcing log wall the riflemen filled the ditch with all means available. Following two-and-a-half hours of bitter fighting a wedge of 50 tanks broke through and advanced to the west, with the division continuing to provide cover against Finnish close-range weapons. The armor soon began overrunning the artillery lines.

Just 1.5km before the Lähde Road junction the tanks halted for regrouping and reinforcements, despite having a clear run to Viipuri. This gave the Finns another respite and the opportunity passed. Planning for another counterattack against the penetration took place overnight on February 13/14, but was cancelled due to the lack of artillery support. The next day the Lähde salient was widened and parts of the support line were rolled up, at a cost to the division of the equivalent of a battalion. The Finns were now forced to evacuate the Summa sector, which had held out for 70 days. To defend against the next move from Lähde they had just the remnants of the 14th Regiment and some teenaged Civic Guards on the bare terrain of Kämärä Ridge, without time or means to dig foxholes. On February 13 the 123rd was recognized for its success with the award of the Order of Lenin, while on March 21 the 245th Rifle Regiment would receive the Order of the Red Banner. Colonel Alyabushev was also awarded the Order of Lenin. At 1600 hours on February 15 Mannerheim authorized the general retirement to the Intermediate Line.

While this Line was as strong as the Mannerheim Line in the Viipuri gateway sector, it was weak nearly everywhere else. 7th Army took Kämärä Station late in the afternoon of February 16 after a lengthy battle that cost both sides heavy casualties. The tanks reached the Intermediate Line by the afternoon of February 18 and charged ahead without infantry support, losing more than 50 over the next two days. By February 24 the line was beginning to break in several places. Timoshenko planned another general offensive for February 28, but Mannerheim had already ordered a withdrawal to the Rear Line, so this mostly met empty trenches. By March 4 the equivalent of 30 Red Army divisions, with 1,200 tanks and 2,000 aircraft, were hammering at the Rear Line. Fighting in the outskirts of Viipuri began the next day, and when the ceasefire began at 1200 hours on March 13 advance elements of 19th Corps were some 8km north of the city.

=== Between the wars ===
On March 21 Colonel Alyabushev was promoted to the rank of Kombrig, which was modernized to major general on June 4. He was placed at the disposal of the Main Personnel Directorate on December 19 and took command of the 87th Rifle Division on March 13, 1941. At the start of the German invasion it was in 5th Army near Vladimir-Volynskii and was quickly torn apart in the frontier battles. Alyabushev was mortally wounded on June 25 leading a bayonet charge in an effort to break out of encirclement. Meanwhile, the 123rd was assigned to the new 23rd Army when it was formed on the Finnish border in May 1941. Col. Evgenii Efimovich Tsukanov had taken command when Alyabushev departed; he had previously led the 47th Rifle Regiment before serving for nearly three years as military attaché to Estonia.

== Continuation War ==
As of June 22 the 123rd was assigned to Lt. Gen. P. S. Pshennikov's 23rd Army's 50th Rifle Corps in Leningrad Military District, soon redesignated as Northern Front. The Corps also contained the 43rd and 70th Rifle Divisions. Its order of battle was as follows:

- 245th Rifle Regiment
- 255th Rifle Regiment
- 272nd Rifle Regiment
- 495th Artillery Regiment
- 323rd Artillery Regiment (until September 13, 1941)
- 495th Howitzer Artillery Regiment (until November 1, 1941)
- 229th Antitank Battalion
- 347th Antiaircraft Battery (later 213th Antiaircraft Battalion, until May 12, 1943)
- 103rd Reconnaissance Company
- 257th Sapper Battalion
- 242nd Signal Battalion (later 884th Signal Company)
- 168th Medical/Sanitation Battalion
- 130th Chemical Defense (Anti-gas) Company
- 142nd Motor Transport Company
- 329th Field Bakery (later 85th Motorized Field Bakery)
- 79th Divisional Veterinary Hospital (from November 1, 1941)
- 407th Field Postal Station
- 196th Field Office of the State Bank

This was an unusual shtat (table of organization and equipment), with an additional artillery regiment, although this allotment was soon consolidated into a standard regiment.

On May 25 the commander of Leningrad District, Lt. Gen. M. M. Popov, and his staff had drawn up a defense plan which created five "covering regions", each manned by a single army and defending a probable axis of attack. The 23rd was the most powerful, responsible for Region #3, the main route on the Karelian Isthmus from Vyborg (Viipuri) to the northern approaches to Leningrad. In addition to 50th Corps he also had 19th Corps, two fortified regions, and the 10th Mechanized Corps.

=== Battle of Porlampi ===
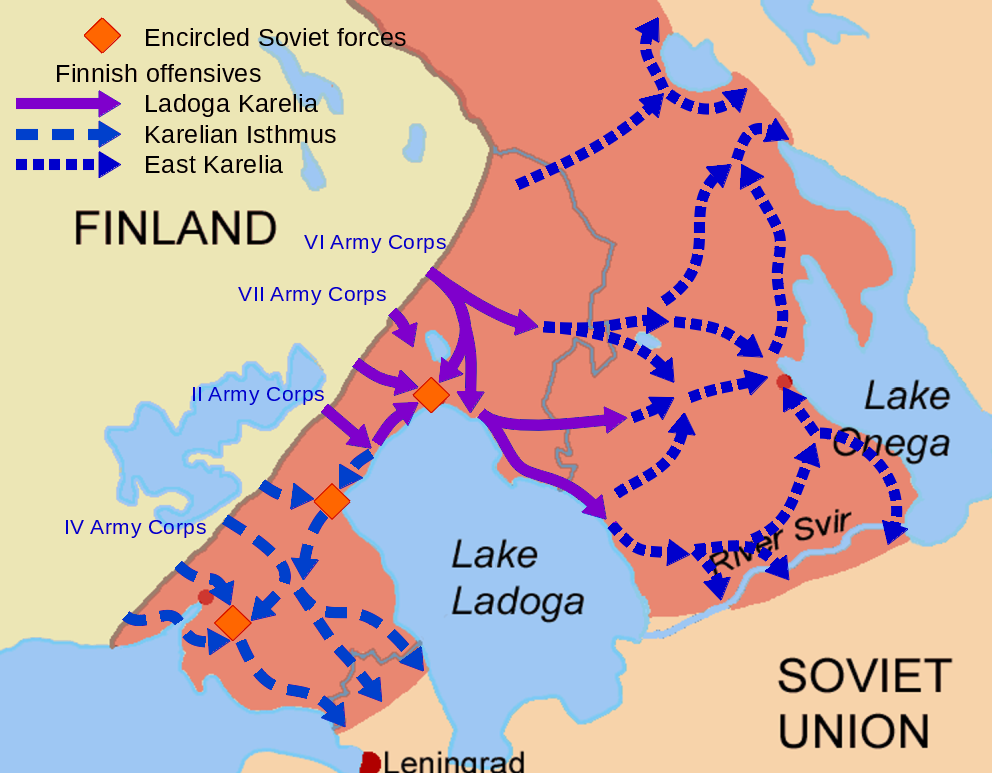
Map of Finnish operations in Karelia in 1941. The red square in the southwest is the location of Porlampi.

Finland declared war on the USSR on June 25, but Mannerheim held his fire on the Karelian Isthmus while operations took place elsewhere to regain the territories lost after the Winter War. On July 21 the command cadre of 50th Corps was withdrawn south of Leningrad while the 123rd and 43rd Divisions came directly under Pshennikov's command. Both were deployed in and near Vyborg. Ten days later Mannerheim launched two corps to clear the northwest shores of Lake Ladoga and retake Sortavala. With this accomplished, on August 10 a larger offensive began, with the objective of freeing the main part of the Isthmus, advancing southwest on a slanting course to cut communications between Vyborg and Leningrad.

On August 14 Finnish troops reached the Vuoksijoki River near Antrea and began clearing its left bank. Pshennikov now began moving units from the southwest side of Vyborg to counterattack on August 16, but this failed and by August 21 the north bank was evacuated. Other Finnish units made an unopposed crossing of the Vuoksi west of Vuosalmi on August 17, establishing a full bridgehead three days later. The STAVKA understood the dire straits faced by 23rd Army and on August 21 ordered the three rifle divisions around Vyborg to destroy their border fortifications and begin to retreat. A sketchy defense line from Vyborg, along the Vuoksi, and then to Lake Ladoga was the immediate goal, by once the Finnish command spotted the withdrawal an immediate pursuit was ordered. The 43rd managed to take up its new positions but could not stop two Finnish divisions from clearing the right bank of the Vuoksi. The 123rd was still holding the southwestern side of Vyborg but was largely disorganized, along with the 115th Rifle Division, due to a rapid retreat from the frontier.

By August 23 the Finnish 8th Infantry Division, well to the south, had cleared the west shore of the Vyborg Bay and advance from the east to a position 8km from the city. The next morning the 123rd and 115th counterattacked in an effort to regain the initiative, and managed to retake as much as 5km in places with the help of heavy artillery fire but failed the break the Finnish front line. Finnish reserves in regimental strength drove the two divisions back to their start line the next day. On August 25 the main rail line from Vyborg to Leningrad was cut by the 12th Infantry Division and two days later the main road as well. The STAVKA now ordered 23rd Army to abandon Vyborg and pull back to the old Mannerheim Line. This would require the reopening of the necessary roads, and in the evening of August 28 one such was cleared at Ylä-Somme, permitting the passage of several truck convoys under Finnish artillery fire. This caused enough damage that the route was soon only open to foot traffic. Additional unsuccessful efforts were made to reopen the rail line. The two sides drew up in the vicinity of Porlampi as the Finns revived their motti tactics of the Winter War. During August 31 the three divisions abandoned their remaining vehicles and heavy weapons and attempted to escape in small groups through the forests, but the 43rd was effectively destroyed. The 123rd and 115th had greater success; a total of some 12,000 men escaped, leaving behind 7,000 dead and 9,000 prisoners, along with 306 guns, 55 tanks, 673 trucks, nearly 300 tractors, and 4,500 horses. The advance elements of the 123rd managed to check the Finnish advance in a few places near Summa before continuing to retreat toward Leningrad. Elsewhere, Finnish forces reached the old Soviet border from before the Winter War, and the cautious Mannerheim ordered a halt. Leningrad continued to be defended by six rifle divisions, most at half strength, and an assortment of smaller units. By September 7 the entire old border line had become the de facto new border, and would remain largely static until the summer of 1944.

=== Siege of Leningrad ===
The division remained along this line until late 1942, very gradually rebuilding, a process made difficult due to Leningrad being largely cut off from the rest of the USSR. Throughout this period it remained under command of 23rd Army. Colonel Tsukanov left his command on October 22, 1941, to become chief of staff of 90th Rifle Division, and later commander of 70th Rifle Division before moving to the support echelon, being promoted to the rank of major general of the quartermaster service in 1943 and serving the last year of the war as quartermaster-general of the 1st Polish Army. He was replaced in command of the 123rd by Col. Yakov Afanasevich Panichkin, Who had previously led the 16th Rifle Division. During most of this period the division's sector was near Lake Lembolovskoye, but in September 1942 it was moved to the Lake Slove-Yarvi area.

== Operation Iskra ==
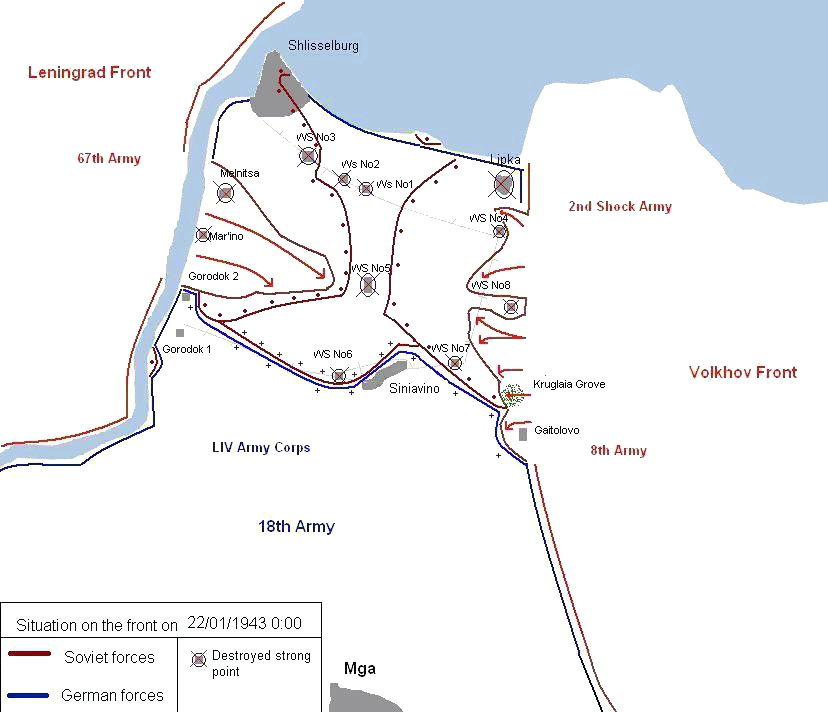
Operation Iskra

On December 22 Panichkin was moved to command of the 92nd Rifle Division and was replaced by Col. Aleksandr Pavlovich Ivanov. This NKVD officer had previously led the 20th NKVD Rifle Division and more recently the 92nd. At about the same time the 123rd left 23rd Army to come under direct command of Leningrad Front. The Front was now under command of Lt. Gen. L. A. Govorov.

After two previous failures to break the German siege lines at and near Sinyavino a new plan of operations was approved on December 27. Leningrad Front, led by 67th Army, was to cross the frozen Neva River and force the German defenses to link up with Volkhov Front's 2nd Shock Army. The offensive, codenamed Iskra ("Spark"), was originally set for January 1, 1943, but poor ice conditions of the Neva forced a postponement until January 10-12. Govorov, an artillery officer, regrouped his guns and mortars extensively to conduct a preparation of 140 minutes and stockpiled three full combat loads of ammunition, far more than for the previous efforts. Prior to the offensive the Front conducted special training, such as attacks on strong points and specific objectives, similar to what the 123rd had done three years earlier.

The two Fronts attacked simultaneously early on January 12. The 136th and 268th Rifle Divisions of 67th Army, in cooperation with tanks and artillery, took the German positions on the Neva from Marino to Gorodok No. 1. By dusk they had forced a bridgehead 5km wide and 3km deep, and by 1800 hours bridges had been built to allow the passage of heavy tanks and the second echelon of the 136th. The next day this division, supported by light tanks, enveloped the right flank of the German 96th Infantry Division in Belyavskoe Swamp, eventually forming a deep salient just 4-5km west of the slowly advancing 2nd Shock Army. Early on January 14 Govorov ordered 67th Army's commander, Maj. Gen. M. P. Dukhanov, to strengthen his first echelon while also committing his second echelon. At dawn the 123rd, in cooperation with the 152nd Tank Brigade and the 123rd Rifle Brigade, deployed on both sides of the 136th. The 268th was also reinforced. Govorov directed the combined force to eliminate German resistance at Gorodok No. 1 and No. 2. This piecemeal commitment across a broad front actually slowed the Army progress.

Starting on January 14 Dukhanov's forces began the familiar process of "gnawing through" the German defenses, at the cost of heavy casualties. The 136th and the 61st Tank Brigade advanced about 2.5km to reach the outskirts of Workers Settlement No. 5 late on January 17. However, German reserves kept the 268th out of Gorodok No. 1 and No. 2. After four days of fighting the 123rd and the 102nd Rifle Brigade took the woods east of the latter but could go no farther. 2nd Shock Army moved at a crawl, but its 18th Rifle Division managed to reach the eastern outskirts of Workers Settlement No. 5. The German front was now beyond repair and the Soviet forces were as little as 1.5km apart, threatening the XXVI Army Corps around Shlisselburg with encirclement.

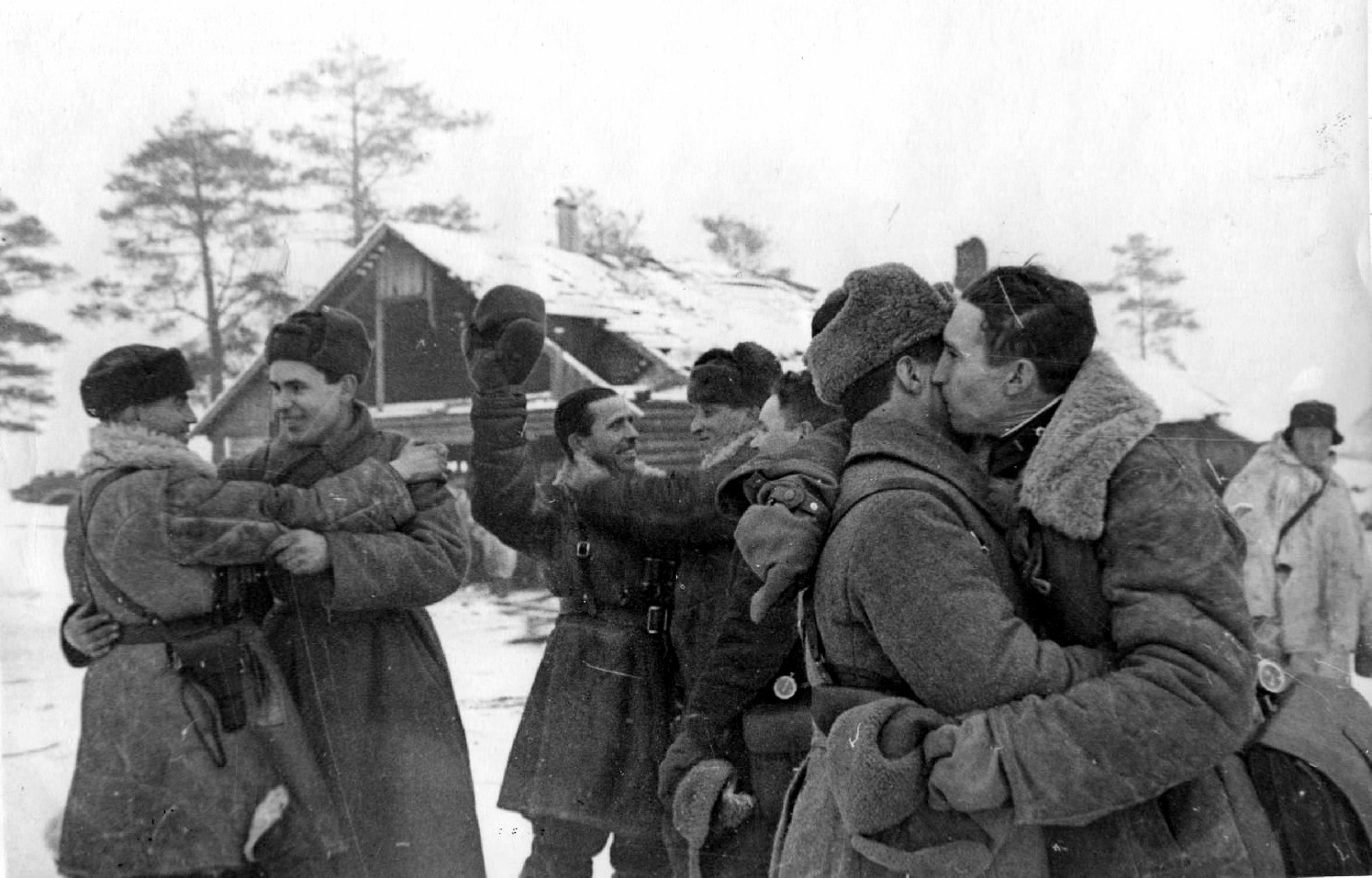
Meeting of 123rd and 372nd Rifle Divisions

The pocket was officially sealed at 0930 hours on January 18 when lead elements of the 123rd met the 372nd Rifle Division just east of Workers Settlement No. 1. Less than an hour later the 136th took Workers Settlement No. 5 and its 269th Rifle Regiment linked up with the 18th around noon. Shlisselburg fell at 1400 as the garrison retreated to the south. In order to escape these forces and most of XXVI Corps would have to run a gauntlet through the forests and bogs past Workers Settlement No. 5 and Podgornyi Station to reach the relative safety of Sinyavino. This proved costly for both sides. 67th and 2nd Shock Armies were also directed to shift southward to take that place, Gorodok No. 1, and No. 2. At the same time German reinforcements arrived to strengthen these sectors. Beginning on January 20 the two Armies repeatedly attacked, with the 123rd focused on Gorodok No. 1. The force attacking Sinyavino managed to gain 3km and cut the rail line southwest from Gorodok No. 1 while also capturing Workers Settlement No. 6, but the village itself and the nearby heights remained in German hands. The offensive finally collapsed on January 31 due to mutual exhaustion. Iskra had been a clear Red Army victory, reopening land communications with Leningrad, but at the cost of 115,082 casualties, including 33,940 killed, captured, or missing. By the end of the offensive the 123rd had been returned to the Front's reserves.

=== Mga Offensives ===
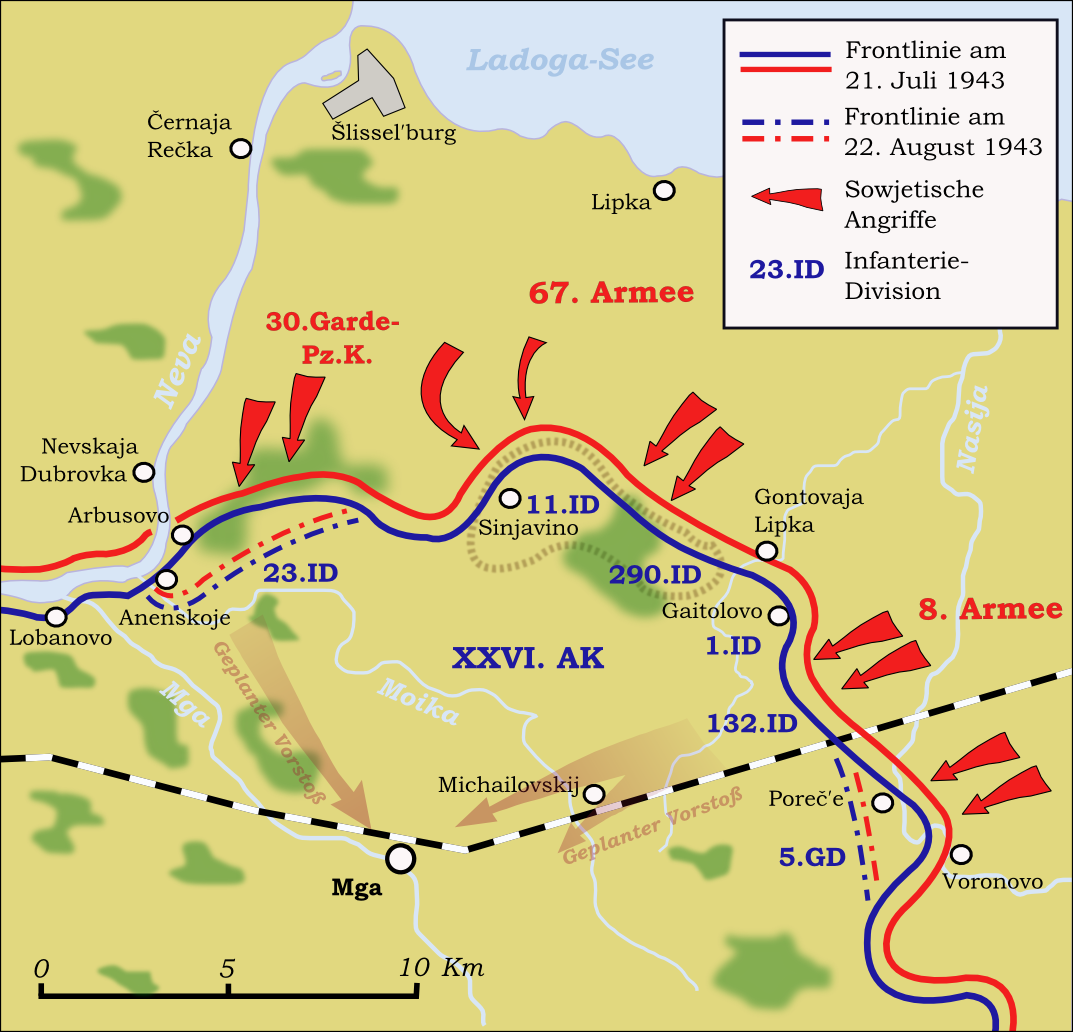
Mga (5th Sinyavino) Offensive

Colonel Ivanov was promoted to the rank of major general on April 21. At the start of July 67th Army had the 30th Guards Rifle Corps plus six separate divisions, including the 123rd, under command. After the German offensive at Kursk had been fought to a standstill the STAVKA ordered Leningrad and Volkhov Fronts to mount an offensive which would defeat German 18th Army and prevent any possibility of restoring the Leningrad blockade. This would additionally tie down German reserves to keep them from reinforcing other sectors. The mission, per the Leningrad war diary:

Monday, 12 July. Our artillery has been concentrating along the Siniavino axis since 1 July. Today it began the planned destruction of enemy engineer works and the suppression of his artillery and mortar batteries. It is as if it were an overture to the forthcoming operation whose main mission is to spoil possible enemy attempts to restore the complete blockade of Leningrad.

The two Fronts were to attack the Mga salient from three sides with the 55th, 67th, and 8th Armies. 67th Army was responsible for the center section between the Neva and Sinyavino. If successful the XXVI Army Corps would be destroyed and both Mga and Sinyavino would be taken.

Dukhanov deployed his Army in the area of Gorodok No. 2 with 30th Guards Corps as his main shock group. With armor support it was to take Arbuzovo before advancing on Mga from the north. He further deployed four divisions to the east with the 123rd on the east (left) flank to attack in the direction of Sinyavino and Gontovaya Lipka to tie down the German Sinyavino grouping. Altogether XXVI Corps' 35,000 men faced a Red Army force of over 75,000 plus 120 tanks. If 67th Army succeeded the 55th would launch a supporting attack. Meanwhile, 8th Army would strike toward Mga from the east. The offensive began early on July 22 following a 150-minute artillery preparation. The 63rd Guards Rifle Division soon achieved its first day objectives, but XXVI Corps quickly reinforced its entire Sinyavino front and the battle became what one guardsman called "an offensive on our bellies." The bloody fighting continued until August 22 and ended with Sinyavino still in German control.

The sixth Sinyavino offensive was set to begin on September 15. 30th Guards Corps, which had been refitting under Corps command since August, was again assigned to 67th Army and was given the task of finally storming the Sinyavino heights. To support the 30th Guards Dukhanov formed two supporting shock groups, with the 123rd and 43rd Rifle Division on the left (east) flank, although the former was now administratively under 2nd Shock. The capture of the Heights was considered crucial to both sides as its possession allowed German artillery observation over the supply lines through the corridor. Sinyavino and its heights were being held by the 11th and 290th Infantry Divisions.

Based on past experience Generals Govorov and Dukhanov both recognized that changes had to be made to the pattern of artillery support:

The battle that had occurred here previously demonstrated that, for success in the attack, it was insufficient to suppress and destroy the enemy firing points and achieve fire superiority. [Instead] it was necessary to destroy the trenches and communications trenches thoroughly to deprive the enemy of the capability for exploiting them for maneuver. One had to change the method of artillery preparation, which had become stereotypical. Usually the enemy soldiers waited through it [the preparation] in "foxes' lairs" and other shelters, and, when the fire shifted into the depth of the defense, they hurried back to the forward trenches in order to greet the attackers with organized fires.

What Govorov and his chief of artillery ordered was that the two hitherto distinct phases of the so-called artillery offensive–the artillery preparation and fires in support of the attack–be combined into a single phase. What resulted was fire that "crept" into the depth of the defense as the infantry advanced, preventing detection of the interval between phases as the preparation proceeded.

The artillery assault worked as planned, and in a 30-minute struggle the 30th Guards Corps seized the Heights that had cost so many lives. Despite this success, the flanking divisions, including the 123rd, bogged down after three days of heavy fighting and the STAVKA allowed Govorov to halt the offensive on September 18. Quick reaction by German tactical reserves contained the drive before it could penetrate toward Mga in the lowlands to the south. By September 25 a period of relative calm descended over the front south of Leningrad.

== Leningrad-Novgorod Offensive ==
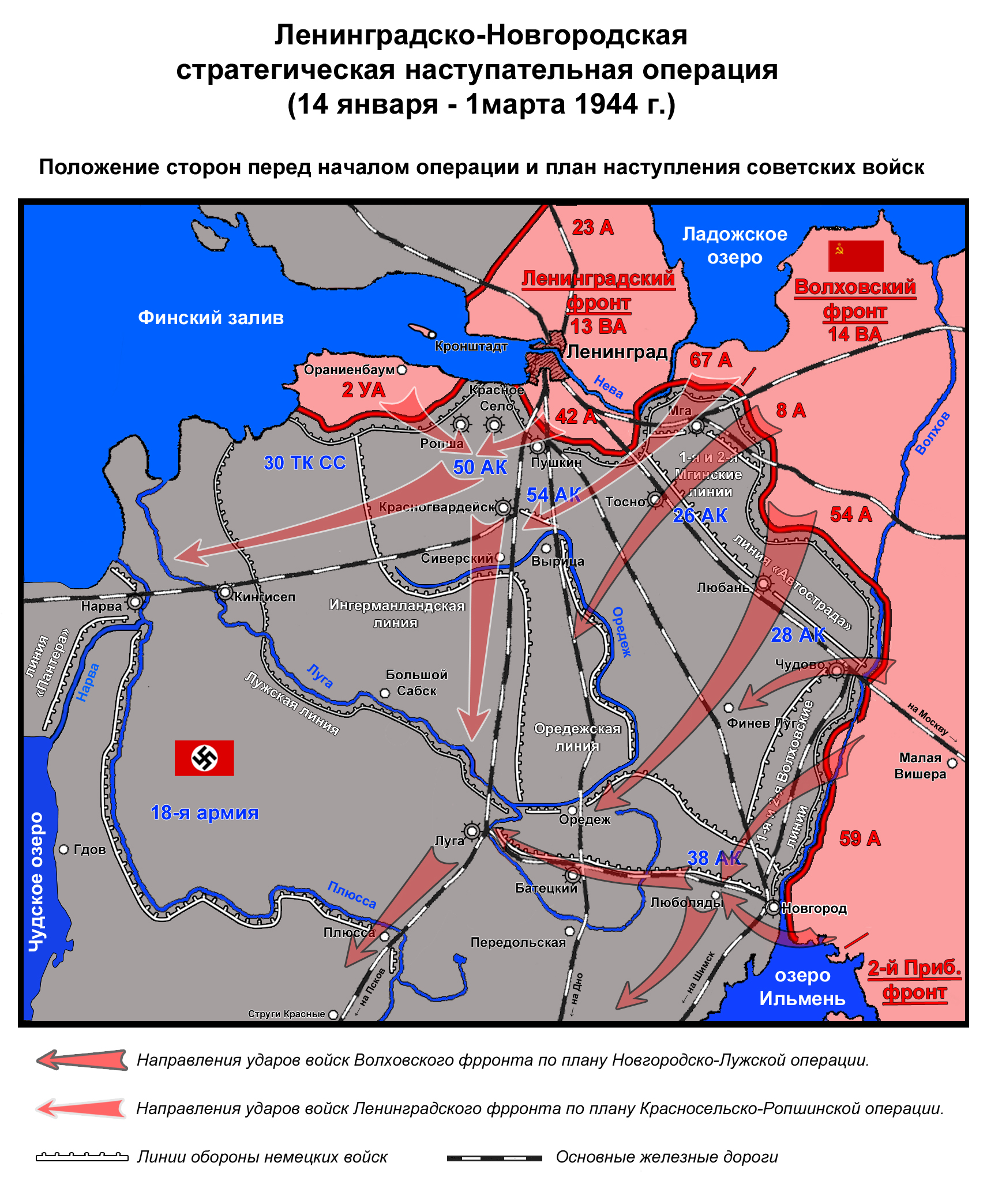
Leningrad-Novgorod Offensive. Note initial position and advance of 67th Army.

In October the 123rd moved west to join 42nd Army, still in Leningrad Front, but within a few weeks it was pulled back into the Front reserves. By the start of the new year it had been assigned to 117th Rifle Corps, still in the Front reserves. This Corps also contained the 120th and 201st Rifle Divisions. Prior to the start of the winter offensive the Corps was assigned to 67th Army.

The Army was now under command of Lt. Gen. V. P. Sviridov. Govorov began planning the winter offensive in early November. Initially, 67th Army was directed to pin down German forces to the east and south of Leningrad to prevent them shifting to the sectors under attack by 2nd Shock and 42nd Armies. Following this, Sviridov was to attack toward Mga and Ulyanovka in the direction of Krasnogvardeisk.

The overall offensive began on January 14. By the morning of January 18 the position of 18th Army had deteriorated to the point that its front was close to collapse and the commander of Army Group North, Col. Gen. G. von Küchler, unsuccessfully pleaded with the OKH and Hitler for permission to withdraw to the Mga River and the so-called Rollbahn Line. By evening he took the decision for himself, which was finally approved by Hitler at midnight. 67th Army began its advance on January 21 once it became known to Leningrad Front's intelligence directorate that Mga and the remaining positions near Sinyavino were being abandoned. At 1700 hours Mga was finally liberated.

The next day Sviridov received orders to take Tosno and clear German forces from the Rollbahn Line. 117th Corps was now released from Front reserve and its commander, Maj. Gen. V. A. Trubachev, was ordered to attack Krasnogvardeisk in cooperation with the 123rd Rifle Corps while the 110th Rifle Corps moved to outflank Pushkin and Slutsk from the west. However, although those latter places were encircled on three sides by late on January 23, Krasnogvardeisk continued to hold out. On the same day the last German shell fell on Leningrad. Nevertheless, Govorov berated Sviridov and his Corps commanders for failing to take Tosno, Ulyanovka, and the Rollbahn Line. However, it was clear the Line could not be held and the commander of 18th Army ordered his troops to evacuate Pushkin and Slutsk. This move caused Govorov to alter his plan for the general offensive, and 67th Army was directed to advance to the south and west, keeping pace with 2nd Shock and 42nd Armies on the right flank. The intention was to trap the withdrawing German forces near Luga in conjunction with Volkhov Front. 117th and 123rd Corps, temporarily under command of 42nd Army, drove toward Krasnogvardeisk against notably lessened resistance. The 120th Division fought into the town overnight on January 25/26, freeing it by 1000 hours. On January 27 the STAVKA declared the siege of Leningrad officially ended, with German forces in retreat at least 65km away. 42nd Army continued to advance south and at 1600 the 117th Corps returned to 67th Army. Army Group North was soon under command of Field Marshal W. Model; 18th Army had been reduced to just 17,000 infantrymen.

=== Novgorod-Luga Offensive ===
On January 29 Govorov directed 2nd Shock and 42nd Armies to push across the Luga River en route to the Narva River. The 67th would advance to the south on the latter's left flank and cooperate with Volkhov Front in finally taking Luga, which it had been struggling to reach for weeks. These orders were modified on February 1, directing the 42nd more to the south as well. Once Luga was taken the 67th was to wheel west toward Pskov. 42nd Army soon threatened the flank and rear of the German Luga grouping, and Model attempted several counterstrokes to halt the advance, without lasting success. On February 11 the 117th Corps gained a bridgehead north of Luga itself. Model now had no choice but to order the abandonment of Luga on February 12. The 117th and 110th Rifle Corps of 67th Army entered the city the same day, and the 123rd received a battle honor:

LUGA - ...123rd Rifle Division (Major General Ivanov, Aleksandr Pavlovich)... By order of the Supreme High Command of 13 February 1944 and a commendation in Moscow, the troops that took part in the liberation of Luga are given a salute of 12 artillery salvoes from 124 guns.

The pursuit of the German forces began immediately and accelerated after February 17 as 18th Army was ordered to pull back to the Panther Line, a move that was expected to last until March 1. Meanwhile the 117th Corps regrouped in the Luga area to serve as Sviridov's new second echelon.

The STAVKA sent a new directive to Govorov on February 22, ordering him to push his offensive forward. 67th and 42nd Armies were specifically to take Pskov and its associated fortified line. Before the end of the month the 117th Corps again entered the Leningrad Front reserves. By now most of the Front's rifle divisions were reduced to 2,500 - 3,500 personnel each. As it pulled up to the Panther Line several attacks were made during March 2-17 with no success, after which Govorov ordered his armies over to the defense, although some limited fighting continued until April 18. During this period the 123rd, with its Corps, served with the Front's 59th Army, south of Narva, but moved to 8th Army in April. In July the division left the Corps and Army and came directly under Front command.

=== Baltic Offensives ===
On August 7 General Ivanov was wounded and hospitalized, being replaced by Col. Tikhon Savilevich Shumskii. After his release in December Ivanov was made chief of the combat and physical training section of Leningrad Front, and would later command the 29th Guards Rifle Division in peacetime. He ended his career with five years service as military commissioner of the city of Leningrad and retired in May 1951.

When the 123rd returned to the fighting front it was assigned to the 124th Rifle Corps of 42nd Army in 2nd Baltic Front. It was soon advancing west of Pustoshka, as part of the Madona Operation. By mid-September it had crossed into Latvia, reaching a point northeast of Krustpils, and by the second week of October it had reached the region northeast of Limbaži. It would spend most of the rest of the war blockading the German forces blockaded in the Courland Pocket in western Latvia. In December it was transferred to the 14th Guards Rifle Corps, still in 42nd Army, before moving again to 123rd Rifle Corps in the same Army about a month later. In February it was moved again, to the 112th Rifle Corps of 1st Shock Army.

== Postwar ==
In March, 1st Shock Army became part of the Kurland Group of Forces, under Leningrad Front. Colonel Shumskii left the division on March 29 and was replaced two days later by Col. Aleksandr Varfolomeevich Shunkov, who would lead it into peacetime. In April 112th Corps left the Kurland Group and ended the war in 67th Army, still in Leningrad Front. When the shooting stopped the men and women of the division shared the full title of 123rd Rifle, Luga, Order of Lenin Division. (Russian: 123-я стрелковая Лужская ордена Ленина дивизия.) Following the German surrender it was relocated to Ukraine, where it was disbanded in January 1946.
