= 115th Rifle Division =

115th Rifle Division (September 7, 1939 – September 20, 1945)
- Active: 1939–1945
- Country: Soviet Union
- Branch: Red Army (1939-46)
- Type: Infantry
- Size: Division
- Engagements: Soviet occupation of the Baltic states (1940); Continuation War; Finnish invasion of the Karelian Isthmus; Battle of Porlampi; Siege of Leningrad; Tikhvin Offensive; Battle of Lyuban; Battle of Nevel (1943); Staraya Russa-Novorzhevsk offensive Baltic offensive Rezhitsa-Dvina offensive Riga offensive (1944); Battle of Memel; East Prussian offensive Samland offensive
- Decorations: Order of the Red Banner
- Battle honours: Kholm

Commanders
- Notable commanders: Maj. Gen. Vasilii Fomich Konkov; Col. Andrei Fyodorovich Mashoshin; Col. Ivan Vladimirovich Gribov; Col. Vasilii Ivanovich Smirnov; Maj. Gen. Nikifor Matveevich Zamirovskii; Col. Ivan Mikhailovich Belousov; Col. Semyon Ivanovich Sobolev; Maj. Gen. Efim Antonovich Lyashchenko; Maj. Gen. Aleksandr Pavlovich Blinov

The 115th Rifle Division was formed as an infantry division of the Red Army in September 1939, in the Moscow Military District, based on the shtat (table of organization and equipment) of that month. It first saw service in the occupation of Lithuania in June 1940, then was moved to the Leningrad Military District where it took up positions along the post-Winter War border with Finland. The Finnish Army began to advance into the Karelian Isthmus in August 1941 and the division was forced to retreat back to the 1939 border, losing much of its strength in the process. It was then incorporated into the Leningrad defenses as part of the Neva Operational Group. As the German 18th Army threatened to capture Tikhvin in December the 115th was moved across Lake Ladoga to reinforce 54th Army, which forced the attackers back to the Volkhov River by the end of the month. During the spring of 1942 the division took part in several battles in an effort to break the siege of the city, particularly those directed toward Lyuban, eventually as part of Volkhov Front, but these were unsuccessful, and it went over to the defense for the balance of the year and into 1943. In September it was briefly part of 11th Guards Army in Bryansk Front, but this was in the process in transitioning to 2nd Baltic Front and in November it became part of 3rd Shock Army. After seeing action near Nevel the division was moved to the northeast where it earned a battle honor for its role in finally liberating the town of Kholm. It was now assigned to 22nd Army of the same Front and during the summer and fall advanced through Latvia, earning the Order of the Red Banner for the capture of Rēzekne in late July. In August the division returned to 3rd Shock, and in September was transferred to 2nd Guards Army, before finally being assigned to 43rd Army in November, where it would remain for most of the rest of the war. This Army was tied up in front of Memel at the time, but just after the start of the January 1945 offensive into East Prussia the 115th was involved in the capture of Tilsit, and two of its regiments won decorations. At this time it was part of 3rd Belorussian Front. From Tilsit the division advanced along the south shore of the Kurisches Haff, north of Königsberg, until it was facing the remaining German forces in the Samland Peninsula. 43rd Army formed part of the Zemland Group of Forces from February 24, but the 115th was transferred back to 2nd Guards Army in March, and fought under this command during the final offensive into Samland in April. Following this it returned to 43rd Army, now under 2nd Belorussian Front, and served briefly postwar as part of the Northern Group of Forces until it was disbanded during the summer and fall.

== Formation ==
The division was officially formed on September 7, 1939, based on a cadre from the 2nd Rifle Regiment of the 1st Rifle Division. In June 1940 it took part in the Soviet occupation of Lithuania. Maj. Gen. Vasilii Fomich Konkov was appointed to command on August 5; he had previously led the 84th Rifle Division. Following this first assignment it was moved to the Leningrad Military District, soon redesignated as Northern Front, where it would be assigned to 19th Rifle Corps of Lt. Gen. P. S. Pshennikov's 23rd Army along the new border with Finland, north of Vyborg. The Corps also contained the 142nd Rifle Division. As of June 22, 1941, the 115th's order of battle was as follows:

- 576th Rifle Regiment
- 638th Rifle Regiment
- 708th Rifle Regiment (until September 11, 1941)
- 292nd Rifle Regiment (from May 15, 1942)
- 313th Artillery Regiment
- 241st Antitank Battalion
- 168th Reconnaissance Company
- 219th Sapper Battalion
- 277th Signal Battalion (later 308th Signal Company)
- 233rd Medical/Sanitation Battalion
- 269th Chemical Defense (Anti-gas) Platoon
- 247th Motor Transport Company (later 244th Battalion)
- 319th Field Bakery (later 224th Motorized Field Bakery)
- 149th Divisional Veterinary Hospital
- 456th Field Postal Station
- 269th Field Office of the State Bank

At this time the division had 12,421 personnel on strength, equipped in part with 80 76mm guns of all types, 150 mortars of all calibres, 54 45mm antitank guns, and eight light tanks. It was tasked with guarding a 47km-wide sector of the border.

== Continuation War ==
On May 25 the commander of Leningrad District, Lt. Gen. M. M. Popov, and his staff had drawn up a defense plan which created five "covering regions", each manned by a single army and defending a probable axis of attack. The 23rd was the most powerful, responsible for Region #3, the main route on the Karelian Isthmus from Vyborg (Viipuri) to the northern approaches to Leningrad. In addition to 19th Corps he also had 50th Rifle Corps, two fortified regions, and the 10th Mechanized Corps.

=== Battle of Porlampi ===
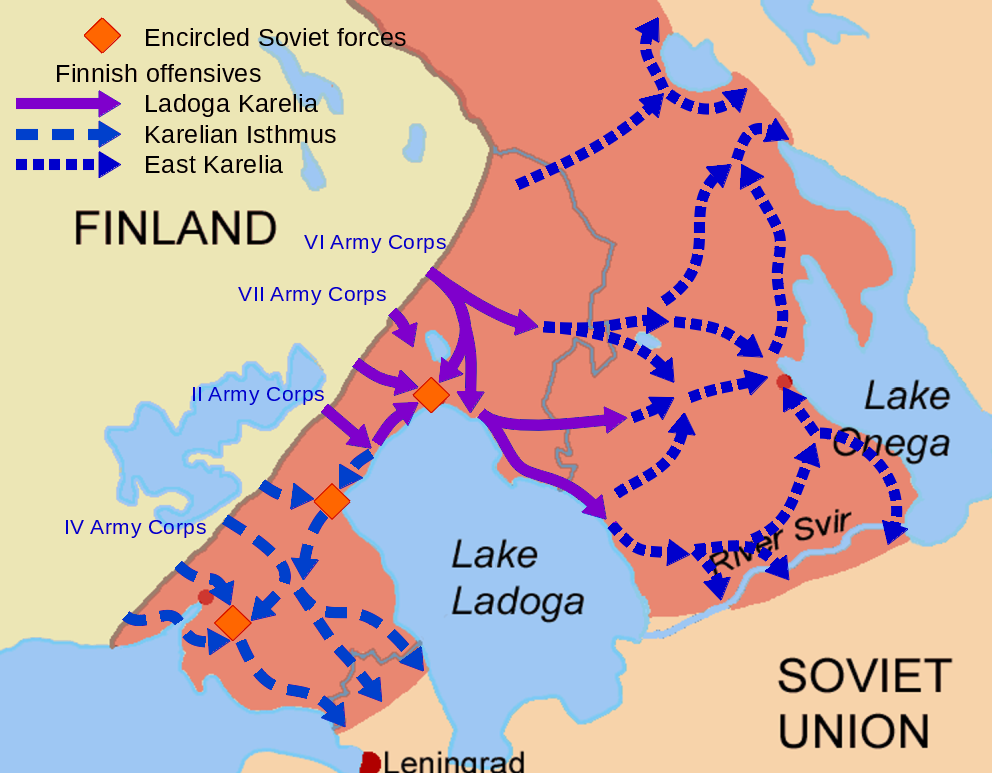
Map of Finnish operations in Karelia in 1941. The red square in the southwest is the location of Porlampi.

Finland declared war on the USSR on June 25, but Field Marshal C. G. E. Mannerheim held his fire on the Karelian Isthmus while operations took place elsewhere to regain the territories lost after the Winter War. By August 1 the 168th Rifle Division had also come under 19th Corps command. Both were deployed in and near Vyborg. Ten days later Mannerheim launched two corps to clear the northwest shores of Lake Ladoga and retake Sortavala. With this accomplished, on August 10 a larger offensive began, with the objective of freeing the main part of the Isthmus, advancing southwest on a slanting course to cut communications between Vyborg and Leningrad.

The advance was led by the VI Army Corps, with II Army Corps in reserve. These faced 19th Corps and 50th Corps (43rd and 123rd Rifle Divisions) plus the 22nd Fortified Region of roughly divisional strength along the coast of the Gulf of Finland. 10th Mechanized had largely been moved south of Leningrad but the 198th Motorized Division remained as a reserve. As Soviet troops were drawn to the south the divisions near the frontier pulled back to more defensible, fortified positions during the last weeks of July, particularly along the Vuoksijoki River. The Finnish 18th Infantry Division penetrated the northern sector of the 115th's line, avoiding the roads and moving through the forests to seize several crossroads, including that at Ilmee on August 4, which forced the division to fall back further. It took up a new line along the Helisevänjoki River where a series of hills added to its defensive strength. The 18th Division reached the Helisevänjoki and cut the Vyborg–Sortavala railroad on August 8.

On August 14 Finnish troops reached the Vuoksijoki near Antrea and began clearing its left bank. Pshennikov now began moving units from the southwest side of Vyborg to counterattack on August 16, but this failed and by August 21 the north bank was evacuated. Other Finnish units made an unopposed crossing of the Vuoksi west of Vuosalmi on August 17, establishing a full bridgehead three days later. The STAVKA understood the dire straits faced by 23rd Army and on August 21 ordered the three rifle divisions around Vyborg (115th, 43rd and 123rd) to destroy their border fortifications and begin to retreat. A sketchy defense line from Vyborg, along the Vuoksi, and then to Lake Ladoga was the immediate goal, by once the Finnish command spotted the withdrawal an immediate pursuit was ordered. The 43rd managed to take up its new positions but could not stop two Finnish divisions from clearing the right bank of the Vuoksi. The 123rd was still holding the southwestern side of Vyborg but was largely disorganized, along with the 115th, due to its rapid retreat from the Vuoksijoki.

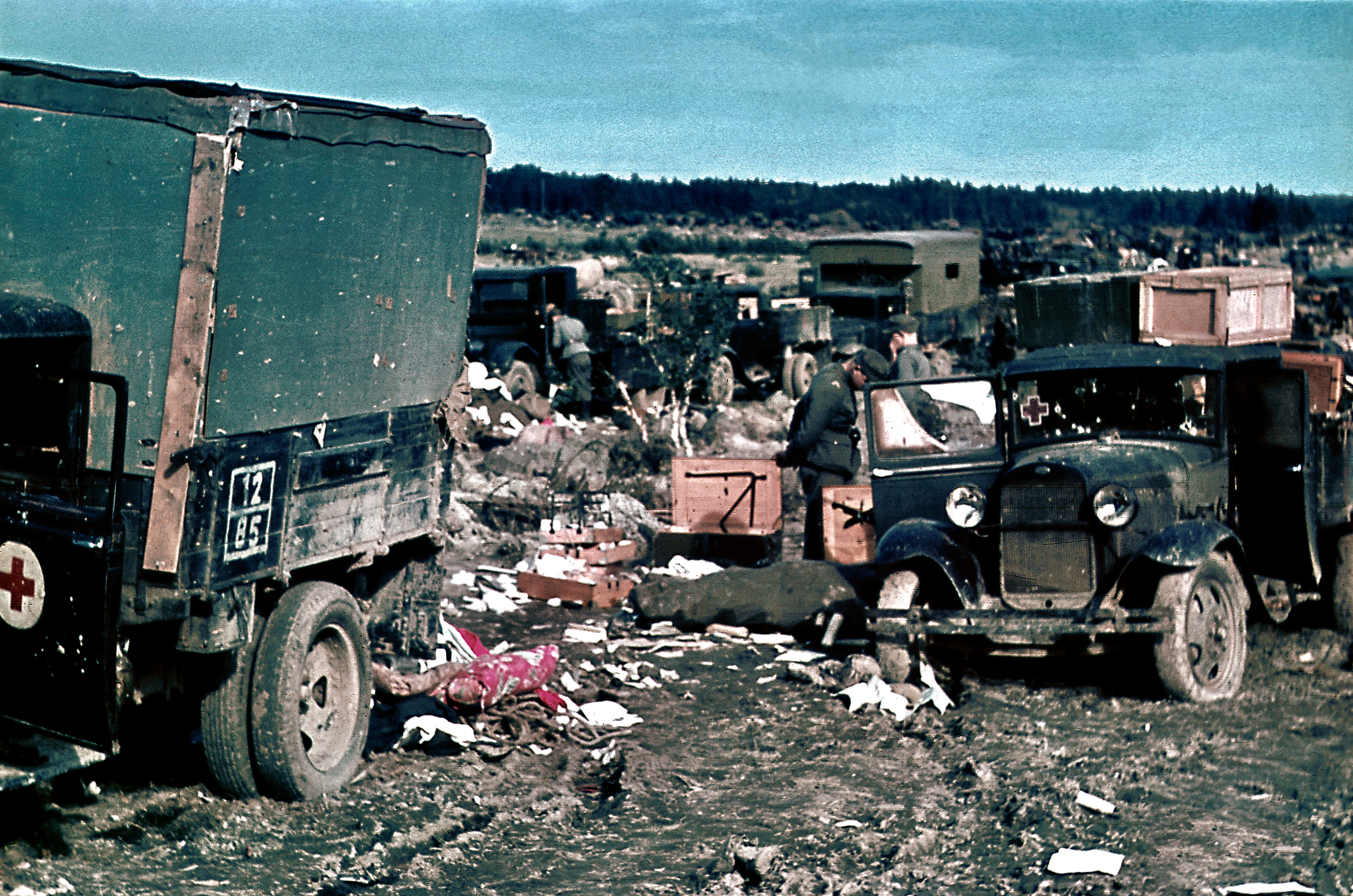
Red Army vehicles and other equipment destroyed in the encirclement

By August 23 the Finnish 8th Infantry Division, well to the south, had cleared the west shore of the Vyborg Bay and advance from the east to a position 8km from the city. The next morning the 115th and 123rd counterattacked in an effort to regain the initiative, and managed to retake as much as 5km in places with the help of heavy artillery fire but failed the break the Finnish front line. Finnish reserves in regimental strength drove the two divisions back to their start line the next day. On August 25 the main rail line from Vyborg to Leningrad was cut by the 12th Infantry Division and two days later the main road as well. The STAVKA now ordered 23rd Army to abandon Vyborg and pull back to the old Mannerheim Line. This would require the reopening of the necessary roads, and in the evening of August 28 one such was cleared at Ylä-Somme, permitting the passage of several truck convoys under Finnish artillery fire. This caused enough damage that the route was soon only open to foot traffic. Additional unsuccessful efforts were made to reopen the rail line. The two sides drew up in the vicinity of Porlampi as the Finns revived their motti tactics of the Winter War. During August 31 the three divisions abandoned their remaining vehicles and heavy weapons and attempted to escape in small groups through the forests, but the 43rd was effectively destroyed. The 115th and 123rd had greater success; a total of some 12,000 men escaped, leaving behind 7,000 dead and 9,000 prisoners, along with 306 guns, 55 tanks, 673 trucks, nearly 300 tractors, and 4,500 horses. The advance elements of the 123rd managed to check the Finnish advance in a few places near Summa before continuing to retreat toward Leningrad. Elsewhere, Finnish forces reached the old Soviet border from before the Winter War, and the cautious Mannerheim ordered a halt. Leningrad continued to be defended by six rifle divisions, most at half strength, and an assortment of smaller units. By September 7 the entire old border line had become the de facto new border,

== Siege of Leningrad ==
The remaining men of the 115th concentrated at Nevskaya Dubrovka. On September 11 the 708th Rifle Regiment, which had been operating with the 168th Division, was officially detached (it would later join the reformed 43rd Division), while the 576th and 638th Regiments were partly replenished with the 4th and 5th Battalions of the Leningrad Opolchenie. Leningrad Front, under the advice of Army Gen. G. K. Zhukov, had formed the Neva Operational Group on September 2, based on the 115th and 46th Rifle Divisions and the 4th Armored Car Regiment, and positioned it facing to the east on the west bank of the Neva River. General Konkov's men had moved into place on September 8, forcing back the 122nd Infantry Division's crossing attempt, just as the 20th Motorized Division was occupying Shlisselburg on the south shore of Lake Ladoga, cutting the last land communications from the city to the rest of the USSR.

On September 20 a combined force from the 115th and the 4th Naval Rifle Brigade forced a crossing of the Neva and established a small bridgehead known as Nevsky Pyatachok. Over the following 48 days Lt. Teshaboy Adilov of the 638th Rifle Regiment distinguished himself sufficiently that he was awarded the Order of Lenin. In addition to his leadership role he also served as a sniper, and was credited with 104 enemy soldiers killed or severely wounded during this fighting, in addition to ten claimed earlier. He was among a handful of men eventually evacuated from the toehold, carrying his wounded commander despite being wounded himself. After recovering in hospital he was appointed as deputy commander of 55th Army's sniper school. His rifle is preserved in the Leningrad Defense Museum. A Tajik by nationality he returned to his homeland and his teaching career postwar, and died there in 1998.

While this small battle continued the main fighting around Leningrad died out, due to strained resources on both sides. On October 6 General Konkov left the 115th to take command of the Neva Operational Group for about a month; subsequently he was evacuated from Leningrad and spent the rest of the war serving a chief of rear services for several armies, mostly in Western Front. He was succeeded by Col. Andrei Fyodorovich Mashoshin, who had previously led the 177th Rifle Division. On October 16 Army Group North launched the Tikhvin Offensive with the objective reaching that town and Volkhov in an effort to surround and eliminate 54th Army, cut Soviet communications across Lake Ladoga, and possibly link up with the Finnish Army. This would be carried out by the I Army Corps and the XXXIX Motorized Corps.

=== First Sinyavino Offensive ===
Tikhvin Offensive. Note positions of Neva Operational Group (G. O. Neva) and 54th Army.

Meanwhile, Leningrad Front prepared what would become known as the First Sinyavino Offensive, an attempt to cut off the German forces in the Shlisselburg corridor with a converging attack by 55th Army inside the siege lines and 54th Army from outside. The Neva Operational Group would most remain on the defensive, but the 115th and 4th Naval Brigade would form a shock group to attack out of Nevsky Pyatachok toward Gorodok No. 1. The commander of the Front, Maj. Gen. I. I. Fedyuninskii, made careful preparations for his offensive, but it was preempted by the German push on Tikhvin. Nevertheless it proceeded, at the insistence of the STAVKA. A diarist in Leningrad noted:

Sunday, 19 October. The 115th Rifle Division and 4th Naval Infantry Brigade have been fighting in the Neva "pocket" for a month already. One can say it had been a month of severe and inhuman education. Today at 2010 hours, two regiments of the 86th Rifle Division... began crossing from the Nevskaya Dubrovka side into the bridgehead.

The diarist went on to state that the 86th's attack the next morning managed to enlarge the bridgehead "somewhat" in hand-to-hand fighting. On October 23 XXXIX Corps captured Budogoshch from 4th Army and Tikhvin was under threat. Fedyuninskii's offensive made only meagre gains in three days of fighting but the STAVKA insisted it continue until this threat became clear, and on October 26 he was moved to command of the 54th. The Sinyavino offensive was shut down on October 28; its main accomplishment had been tying down the five German divisions facing it.

During November the division was pulled back to the reserves of Leningrad Front, where it was replenished after falling to an active strength of just 82 "bayonets" (riflemen and sappers). By November 25 the 54th Army stopped the advance of I Corps 6km short of Volkhov in rapidly deteriorating winter weather. The next day Fedyuninskii attacked the 21st Infantry Division with three divisions and a rifle brigade, driving in back several kilometres by November 29. Meanwhile the 115th was preparing to transfer across the Ladoga ice road out of Leningrad to join this Army; it would remain under its command into September 1943. The counteroffensive grew through the following weeks and on December 15 the division arrived with the 198th (now a standard rifle division) and helped drive the Germans back to Olomny by December 17, enveloping the I Corps' left flank on the west bank of the Volkhov River. During this retreat, the Army's 1st and 2nd Ski Battalions constantly harassed the Germans' flank and rear. In the final stages, elements of the 115th, 300th, and 377th Rifle Divisions cut the Mga–Kirishi rail line, but they were unable to capture the latter stronghold, which would remain in German hands until the autumn of 1943. Colonel Mashoshin had been removed from command on December 16; he would soon be reassigned to lead the rebuilt 43rd Division. He was replaced by Col. Ivan Vladimirovich Gribov, who had been leading the 1st Mountain Rifle Brigade.

On December 17 the STAVKA created the new Volkhov Front, but 54th Army remained under Leningrad Front. The new Front, along with the 54th, was tasked with relieving Leningrad by breaking through toward Lyuban. This required establishing viable bridgeheads over the Volkhov, but 18th Army was successful in creating a defensive line after falling back from Tikhvin. Fedyuninskii began the new offensive on January 4, 1942, attacking two divisions of I Corps at Pogoste, west of Kirishi. In 48 hours of heavy fighting only 4-5km were gained before reinforcements from 12th Panzer Division drove the 54th Army troops back to their start lines. After a regrouping the Army struck again on January 13 against the reinforced 269th Infantry Division and managed to take Pogoste four days later but did not penetrate the main German defense, in part due to dispersal of strength. On February 16 Colonel Gribov left the 115th, taking over the 11th Rifle Division within weeks. He was replaced by Col. Vasilii Ivanovich Smirnov, who had been serving as chief of staff of the 11th.

==== Battle of Lyuban ====
During this period Volkhov Front's 2nd Shock Army and other forces had penetrated the Volkhov defenses on a narrow sector and exploited through the forests and swamps toward Lyuban but failed to reach Leningrad. During March it became clear that 2nd Shock was effectively trapped and would have to be rescued by destroying the German forces in the Lyuban–Chudovo–Kirishi area. To this end 54th Army was reinforced with the 4th Guards Rifle Corps and this shock group was to attack toward Lyuban from the north. This began on March 4, and by March 15 the line of the 269th Infantry had been penetrated to a depth of 22km, but the thrust had been largely checked by March 25. 2nd Shock had already been cut off by a German counterattack.

A new rescue plan was put forward on May 2, in which 54th Army, in cooperation with 4th Army, would eliminate the Kirishi salient while also striking again toward Lyuban. Once the latter move was underway the 115th and 285th Rifle Divisions would be transferred to 4th Army and conduct an offensive on Chudovo with two other divisions. In the event it soon became clear that 2nd Shock would have to be authorized to break out, and this transfer did not take place. At this time 54th Army was part of the short-lived Volkhov Group of Forces under Leningrad Front, but in June was fully transferred to Volkhov Front. The Army played a very limited role in the Second Sinyavino Offensive in the summer but otherwise remained on the defensive through the rest of 1942, with the 115th in the vicinity of Posadnikov Ostrov. Colonel Smirnov left the division for a staff position in 54th Army on July 13, being replaced by Maj. Gen. Nikifor Matveevich Zamirovskii, who had been in command of the 310th Rifle Division. Zamirovskii in turn departed on September 14 to the 7th Rifle Division and was replaced by Lt. Col. Ivan Mikhailovich Beloyusov, who would be promoted to full colonel on October 24.

During January 1943 the northern wing of Volkhov Front (2nd Shock and 8th Armies) and Leningrad Front's 67th Army finally penetrated the Shlisselburg corridor in Operation ''Iskra'' and restored land communications to the city. This led Marshal Zhukov to contemplate a new operation called Polar Star (Polarnaya Zvezda) to encircle and destroy the German forces in the Mga–Sinyavino area. 54th Army faced just three German divisions across a 100km-wide front and would be responsible for breaking through to Tosno and linking up with 55th Army. The latter attacked on February 10 but was unable to take Krasnyi Bor. 54th Army struck the same day against the 96th Infantry Division with four rifle divisions, (these did not include the 115th), three brigades, and a tank brigade, but made little progress in three days of fighting. On February 19 the German 16th Army began evacuating the salient at Demyansk, which freed up enough reserves to make Polar Star impossible.

== Pustoshka-Idritsa Offensive ==
Colonel Beloyusov left the 115th on July 2, being replaced by Col. Semyon Ivanovich Sobolev, who had previously led the 24th Rifle Brigade. On September 29 the division left 54th Army and was reassigned to 11th Guards Army of Bryansk Front. This Front was disbanded on October 10 and its headquarters was moved north to form Baltic Front, which on October 20 became 2nd Baltic Front. It was soon assigned to 36th Guards Rifle Corps in this Army, but in November was reassigned to 3rd Shock Army in the same Front.

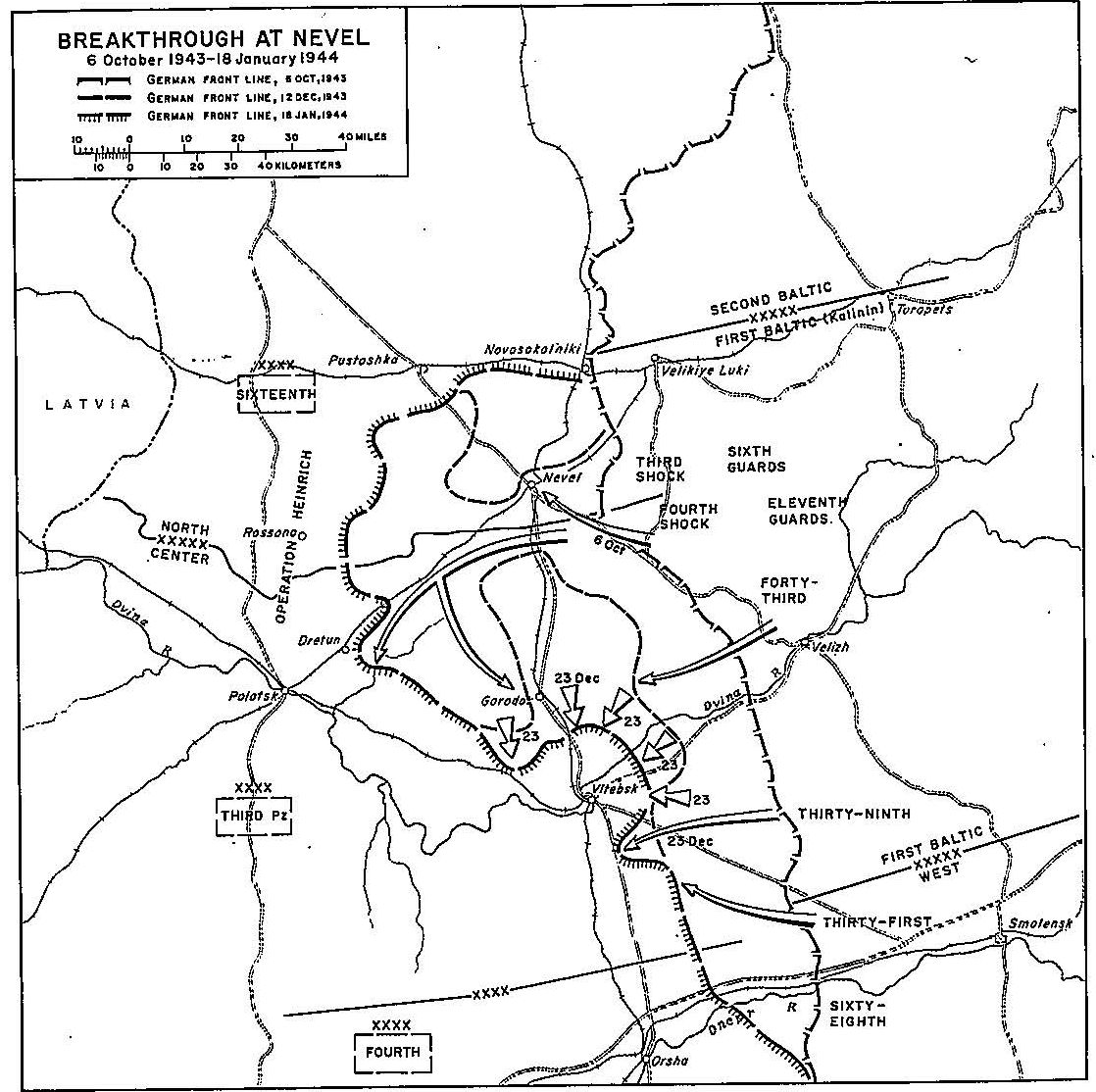
Map of Battle of Nevel (October 1943 - January 1944)

On October 6 the 3rd and 4th Shock Armies had scored a surprise victory and liberated the town of Nevel. 1st Baltic Front prepared to resume the offensive westward from the Nevel salient. The Front commander, Army Gen. A. I. Yeryomenko, had thoroughly reorganized 3rd Shock, replacing divisions worn down in the Nevel offensive with relatively fresh ones, including the 115th, 146th, 326th Rifle and 18th Guards Rifle Divisions that had been received as replacements. The Pustoshka-Idritsa offensive began on November 2. 3rd Shock, led by the 21st and 46th Guards Rifle Divisions, smashed through the defenses of 16th Army's Group von Below, then turned the right flank of the 58th Infantry Division. The 146th and 326th, backed by 78th Tank Brigade, formed an echelon to the left flank and rear. Pivoting northward, the force headed deep into the German rear towards Pustoshka, penetrating more than 30km deep on a 40km front by November 7. As this advance continued the 115th was committed on the right flank of the shock group, and was soon grouped with the 146th and 245th Rifle Divisions to form 100th Rifle Corps.

The advance had left a long German-held salient that stretched from Novosokolniki nearly as far south as Nevel. Army Group North faced an even more dire situation when 6th Guards Army entered the fighting on November 10 in the lake district northeast of Nevel. By mid-month the 115th and the 146th, plus the 78th Tanks, formed the northwest part of 3rd Shock's salient on the southwest approaches to Pustoshka. The 146th also supplied flank support to the 119th Guards Rifle Division and 118th Tank Brigade's successful attack on the village of Podbereze, which threatened to cut the railway from Novosokolniki to Pustoshka. However, the attempt to penetrate and eliminate the salient was repelled and on November 15 the 6th Guards Army was ordered over to the defense, followed by the remainder of 2nd Baltic Front on November 21. The 115th was transferred to 90th Rifle Corps before the Front began a new offensive for Idritsa and Opochka on December 16, but this failed after several days of fighting. Finally, on December 29, Army Group North began an operation to withdraw its forces from the salient north of Nevel. This caught the Red Army by surprise, similar to the German withdrawal from Demyansk, and although a pursuit was soon organized, no German groupings were cut off, and by January 6, 1944, they had established a new line south of Pustoshka and Novosokolniki. On January 2, Colonel Sobolev was moved to the position of deputy commander, and Maj. Gen. of Technical Forces Efim Antonovich Lyashchenko took command; he had previously worked primarily in the chemical warfare service.

=== Battle of Kholm ===
As the Leningrad–Novgorod offensive began on January 14 a piece of unfinished business remained south of the main front. The small town of Kholm had remained in German hands since its relief at the end of the battle of the Kholm Pocket in early May 1942. In the intervening time it had remained under observation by the 33rd Rifle Division, which had been the leading Red Army unit in the pocket battle. The 115th was assigned to the 93rd Rifle Corps, under direct Front command. The town was taken from elements of German II Army Corps on February 21 and the division earned a battle honor:

KHOLM - By the order of the Supreme High Command the following are given the name Kholm: ...115th Rifle Division (Major General Lyashchenko, Efim Antonovich)...

Following this victory the division came under the 44th Rifle Corps of 22nd Army, still in 2nd Baltic Front.

== Baltic Offensives ==
On June 22 General Lyashchenko left the 115th; he would soon command the 200th Rifle Division. He was replaced by Col. Aleksandr Pavlovich Blinov, who would remain in command for most of the rest of the war, and would be promoted to major general on April 20, 1945. He came to the division from the position of chief of operations of 22nd Army. By this time the 44th Corps had the 115th and 325th Rifle Divisions under command.

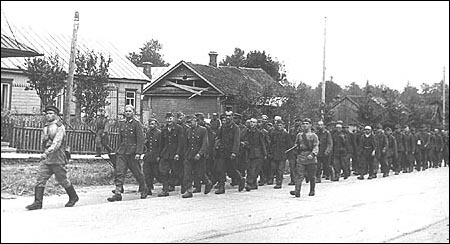
German POWs march through Rēzekne, 1944

On July 8, as its Front entered the general offensive, the 115th was facing the German Panther Line defenses from across the Alolya River, about 25km northeast of Idritsa. By the beginning of August it had advanced as far as Preiļi, after having taken Rēzekne on July 27, for which the division would be awarded the Order of the Red Banner on August 9. Later in August the 44th Corps was transferred to 3rd Shock Army, and by mid-month was in the vicinity of Jēkabpils. Later in the month the division, with its Corps, was transferred again, now to 2nd Guards Army in 1st Baltic Front, and in the first days of October had advanced as far as Radviliškis in Lithuania.

On October 10 the 43rd Army, under command of Lt. Gen. A. P. Beloborodov, reached the outer perimeter of the heavily fortified city of Memel, but initial efforts to take it off the march failed, and three days later it went over to the defense, along with the rest of the Front. In November 44th Corps was transferred to this Army, and in December the 115th was in turn transferred to 103rd Rifle Corps, where it would remain for the duration of the war. At the start of the new year 43rd Army was holding a front of over 230km, and Memel was continuing to hold out.

== East Prussian Offensives ==
43rd Army was initially assigned only a supporting role the final offensive into East Prussia, which began on January 13. In fact, most of Beloborodov's troops would soon be reassigned and he was left with just the 103rd and 90th Rifle Corps under command, across a front of 130km. During the evening of January 19 the Army received reports that German forces were preparing to retreat across the Neman River, and demolitions were being carried out in Tilsit. The commander of the 103rd, Lt. Gen. I. I. Missan, urged Beloborodov to begin a pursuit, but the latter insisted on waiting for orders. By now the 39th Army of 3rd Belorussian Front had nearly cut off the German Tilsit grouping, and later in the evening Beloborodov was signaled that his Army had been transferred to that Front. Meanwhile, the 103rd, along with the 90th and the reassigned 54th Rifle Corps, prepared to make a joint attack on Tilsit. This began on the morning of January 20, as men of the 103rd and 90th Corps rushed across the frozen river to link up with the 54th already fighting in the city. The 115th fought through the German 69th Infantry Division to reach two regiments of 54th Corps, and by afternoon the city was completely cleared. On February 19 the 292nd Rifle Regiment would be awarded the Order of Suvorov, 3rd Degree, while the 638th Regiment received the Order of Kutuzov, 3rd Degree, for their parts in taking Tilsit.

By January 22 the German IX Army Corps, which had been defending in the area Insterburg–Gumbinnen had been largely destroyed, with the remnants being pursued by 43rd, 39th, and 11th Guards Armies, which reached the Kurisches Haff along the line of the Deime River. 103rd Corps, after an advance of some 23km, was between the Nemonin River and Agilla by nightfall. The German command, understanding the threat to Königsberg, threw all available reserves into this line and also along the Alle River. At dawn on January 23 Beloborodov's forces struck the heavily fortified town of Labiau after a short preparation. Elements of two divisions put up a stubborn defense, making use of machine gun and mortar fire, and forcing the 103rd Corps to go to ground before it could cross the Deime. However, the 115th and the 263rd Rifle Division of 54th Corps managed to force the river on either flank and threatened the Labiau garrison with encirclement from north and south. At this juncture the 319th Rifle Division of 103rd Corps broke into the town from the east. The defenders attempted to escape but were largely rounded up by arriving mobile units. The victory netted 350 prisoners and a large stock of weapons and ammunition.

Following this the advance slowed to a pace of 4-10km per day. German forces were being withdrawn from Memel, which was untenable, to defend the town of Cranz. The battle for this place continued until February 4, by which point the 39th Army had cut Königsberg off from the Samland Peninsula. By mid-month the 43rd Army had returned to 1st Baltic Front. Just as it was about to begin a new operation to split the German Samland grouping it was preempted on February 19 by that grouping's attempt to relieve Königsberg. This fighting continued until March 7, but did not directly involve the 115th. As of February 24 1st Baltic Front became the Zemland Group of Forces under 3rd Belorussian. Later in March the 115th was transferred with 103rd Corps to 2nd Guards Army, and did not take part in the battle for Königsberg in early April. Colonel Blinov handed the division over to Col. Afanasii Pavlovich Skrynnik on March 26 but returned on April 8.

=== Samland Offensive ===
While this battle took place the 2nd Guards was directed to clear the remaining German positions in the Samland Peninsula, particularly the port of Pillau. This objective was heavily bombed on April 8, but the 2nd Guards made little progress until it was joined on April 13 by additional forces freed up after the fall of Königsberg. It was assigned an attack sector 20km wide on the north flank, and was to attack in the direction of Gross Hubniken, with a supporting attack toward Germau. On the first day the Army broke the defense in two places, advanced 2.5km, and took 1,017 prisoners. The next day the remaining German forces began to retreat to the west and 2nd Guards gained another 15km, while capturing another 2,500 men and a large amount of equipment. On April 15 the Army reached the Baltic, having cleared the northwestern sector of the peninsula. What remained of the German forces pulled into the heavily-fortified Pillau area, which was not taken until April 25.

== Postwar ==
The Zemland Group was disbanded on April 26 and the division returned to 43rd Army, now under 2nd Belorussian Front. Its men and women now shared the full title of 115th Rifle, Kholm, Order of the Red Banner Division. (Russian: 115-я стрелковая Холмская Краснознамённая дивизия.) Under the terms of STAVKA Order No. 11097, part 2, of May 29 the 43rd Army, where the 115th was a separate division since the disbandment of 103rd Corps, would become part of the Northern Group of Forces effective June 10. During the summer and fall it was gradually disbanded to provide replacements for the 90th Guards Rifle Division.

Once this business was completed in October General Blinov was moved to the educational establishment, primarily at the Frunze Military Academy, and later at the Ministry of Internal Affairs, before his retirement in December 1958.
