= Filipp Starikov =

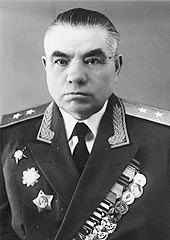
- Born: 14 November [O.S. 2 November] 1896; Urzhumsky District, Vyatka Governorate, Russian Empire
- Died: 2 October 1980 (aged 83)
- Allegiance: Russian Empire (1915–1918); Soviet Russia (1918–1922); Soviet Union (1922–1955)
- Service years: 1915–1955
- Rank: Lieutenant general (1942–1955)
- Commands: 8th Army (Soviet Union) (1942–1945)
- Conflicts: World War I; Russian Civil War; World War II; Winter War; Continuation War; Finnish invasion of the Karelian Isthmus; Battle of Porlampi; Siege of Leningrad; Sinyavino Offensive; Leningrad–Novgorod Offensive; Battle for Narva Bridgehead; Tallinn Offensive
- Awards: Order of Lenin; Order of the Red Banner

Filipp Nikiforovich Starikov (Russian: Фили́пп Никано́рович Ста́риков; 14 November [O.S. 2 November] 1896 – 2 October 1980) was a Soviet military commander.

== Biography ==
Starikov was born in the village of Novo-Torzhatskaya in Urzhumsky District in Vyatka Governorate (now in Kirov Oblast). He entered the Imperial Russian Army in 1915 as a private. During World War I he served as senior clerk of an infantry regiment on the Romanian Front. He joined the Red Army in 1918 and served in the Russian Civil War as a platoon commander, fighting the White movement on the Eastern Front and Southern Front as well as the Basmachi movement in Russian Turkestan. In 1928 he completed the Vystrel course intended to train battalion and regimental officers for the Soviet infantry.

In 1938 Starikov received command of the 9th Rifle Corps, part of the 7th Army. During the Winter War Starikov's unit was to capture the Finnish town of Terijoki (now Zelenogorsk, Russia). Rather than an expected easy victory, the Red Army performed poorly, and while the Soviet Union was able to impose several territorial concessions on Finland, the reputation of the Soviet armed forces suffered. In June 1940 Starikov was promoted to major general and later named Chief Inspector of the Red Army's Infantry Inspectorate.

With the German invasion of the Soviet Union in June 1941, Starikov received command of the 19th Rifle Corps, part of the 23rd Army on the Northern Front. His unit unsuccessfully defended the Karelian region after Finland invaded to reconquer the territory, lost after the Winter War. After a decisive loss at the Battle of Porlampi in early September Starikov and the rest of the 23rd Army spent the rest of the month defending the northwestern approaches to Leningrad. In December Starikov was named deputy commander of the 8th Army, part of the Volkhov Front, becoming commander in April 1942.

In August 1942 the Red Army launched the Sinyavino Offensive to break the German blockade of Leningrad. The German 11th Army, however, had just arrived from the Crimea under Erich von Manstein, with 12 divisions. The German high command had planned to finish off the Leningrad siege with Operation Nordlicht but due to the Soviet offensive had to instead use the 11th Army to hold their forward positions. By September 25 the German forces had encircled much of the 8th Army and on the 29th Volkhov Front commander Kirill Meretskov ordered the Soviet withdrawal. In November Starikov was promoted to lieutenant general.

Another Soviet attempt to relieve Leningrad came in January 1943 as the Battle of Stalingrad sapped Germany of manpower, supplies, and morale. During Operation Iskra the 8th Army under Starikov supported the 2nd Shock Army on its southern flank, but made little progress. Nevertheless, the operation was a partial success, establishing a land corridor to Leningrad that enabled far more essential supplies to reach its inhabitants. On July 22, the Red Army launched the Mga Offensive, named for the town of Mga, where the 8th Army was supposed to link up with 67th Army. Starikov's 8th Army attacked from the east, but was unsuccessful, and the offensive ended with large Soviet losses on August 22.

In January 1944 Starikov's 8th Army participated in the Leningrad–Novgorod Offensive, providing vital defense during the Battle for Narva Bridgehead when the German 170th, 11th, and 227th Infantry Divisions under Hyacinth Graf Strachwitz penetrated deep into Soviet lines. After a period of rest and reinforcement, Starikov and 8th Army next saw action during the Narva Offensive, successfully capturing Narva but failing to dislodge Axis forces from the Tannenberg Line. Along with the 2nd Shock Army and the Baltic Fleet, the 8th Army took mainland Estonia in the Tallinn Offensive in September. As a subset of the overall Baltic Offensive, 8th Army was part of the Moonsund Operation in November that cleared Axis forces from the West Estonian archipelago. The 8th Army defended the Estonian coast from December to May 1945 and in October 1945 it was disbanded.

From 1945 to 1949 Starikov served as deputy commander of the Moscow Military District and as Assistant Inspector General of Infantry for the inspector general of the Soviet Ministry of Defense. From 1949 to 1951 and again from 1953 to 1954 he served as deputy chair of the central committee of DOSAAF, the Soviet Union's paramilitary sports organization. Between those tenures he worked for the Council of Ministers of the Soviet Union. Until his retirement in 1955 he held a position at the Moscow State Institute of International Relations.

== Awards and decorations ==
Order of Lenin (21 February 1945)
Order of the Red Banner, three times (22 February 1938, 3 November 1944, 20 June 1949)
Order of Suvorov, 1st class (5 October 1944)
Order of Kutuzov, 1st class (27 December 1943)
Order of the Red Star (11 April 1940)
Medal "For the Defence of Leningrad" (22 December 1942)
Medal "For the Victory over Germany in the Great Patriotic War 1941–1945" (9 May 1945)
Jubilee Medal "Twenty Years of Victory in the Great Patriotic War 1941-1945" (7 May 1965)
Jubilee Medal "Thirty Years of Victory in the Great Patriotic War 1941–1945" (25 April 1975)
Jubilee Medal "XX Years of the Workers' and Peasants' Red Army" (22 February 1938)
Jubilee Medal "30 Years of the Soviet Army and Navy" (22 February 1948)
Jubilee Medal "40 Years of the Armed Forces of the USSR" (18 December 1957)
Jubilee Medal "50 Years of the Armed Forces of the USSR" (22 December 1967)
Jubilee Medal "60 Years of the Armed Forces of the USSR" (28 January 1978)
Medal "Veteran of the Armed Forces of the USSR" (20 May 1976)
Medal "In Commemoration of the 800th Anniversary of Moscow" (1947)
Medal "In Commemoration of the 250th Anniversary of Leningrad" (16 May 1957)
