= 20th NKVD Rifle Division =

20th Rifle Division VV NKVD (September 8, 1941 - August 16, 1942)
- Active: 1941–1942
- Country: Soviet Union
- Type: Infantry
- Size: Division
- Engagements: Siege of Leningrad; Continuation War

Commanders
- Notable commanders: Col. Aleksandr Pavlovich Ivanov

The 20th NKVD Rifle Division was activated as an administrative headquarters for a group of internal security and railroad regiments of the NKVD at the outbreak of the war with Germany, in the Leningrad Military District. By the middle of August these units had largely been detached to army-level units for security duties, and the headquarters was used to form a rifle division at Tikhvin. Once it finished forming in October it was inside the Leningrad siege lines as part of Leningrad Front's Neva Operational Group where it took tremendous losses in a series of futile supporting attacks across the Neva River in early November. It was then moved to the Front reserves. During February 1942 it was reassigned to 23rd Army in the Karelian Isthmus facing the Finnish Army in the northern outskirts of Leningrad, and it was under this command on August 16 when it was transferred to Red Army control and designated as the 2nd formation of the 92nd Rifle Division.

== Formation ==
The division began as a prewar administrative headquarters which was activated near Leningrad at the outbreak of war with Germany on or shortly after June 22, 1941. Its order of battle was as follows:

- 151st NKVD Regiment (assigned to 48th Army on August 20)
- 152nd NKVD Regiment
- 154th NKVD Regiment (assigned to 23rd Army on August 20)
- 155th NKVD Regiment
- 111th, 166th, 167th NKVD Battalions

Once these reassignments were completed the headquarters was repurposed for a full rifle division, numbered as the 20th, on September 8. Its basis was the 56th NKVD Rifle Brigade, which was under command of NKVD Col. Aleksandr Pavlovich Ivanov, and he would take command of the division. On the same date the blockade of Leningrad began as German forces captured Shlisselburg, reached the south shore of Lake Ladoga, and cut the last land communications with the rest of the USSR.

The 20th also incorporated elements of Leningrad partisan and volunteer militia units, students of the firefighting school, worker's militia, and NKVD security elements from the rear of 8th and 23rd Armies. By early October it had completed forming with a total of 6,908 personnel, 32.8 percent of whom were members of the Communist Party and a further 17.8 percent members of the Komsomol, together over half of the total. Its basic order of battle was as follows:

- 7th NKVD Rifle Regiment
- 8th NKVD Rifle Regiment
- 9th NKVD Rifle Regiment
- 10th NKVD Rifle Regiment

== Battle on the Neva ==
As of the start of October the 20th NKVD was in the reserves of Leningrad Front as it completed forming, but by a month later had been assigned to the Neva Operational Group. Beginning on October 16 the German 18th Army struck toward Tikhvin and Volkhov in a bid to deepen the blockade of the city. A month earlier the 115th Rifle Division and 4th Naval Infantry Brigade of the Neva Group had formed a narrow bridgehead on the east bank of the Neva which became known as the "Nevsky Pyatachok". The STAVKA now insisted that the Group, along with the 55th Army, use this as a springboard to attack toward Sinyavino in support of the 4th, 52nd, and 54th Armies defending against 18th Army's offensive. This drive was halted by November 8 due to stiff resistance and extreme cold; the attacks across the Neva from November 2 to November 7 had little impact on the overall situation as they had simply pinned the defending German divisions along the river in place, at a huge cost in Soviet casualties. The 20th NKVD lost all but 300 of its "bayonets" (riflemen and sappers) during this period. The remnants of the division were back in the Front reserves by the start of 1942.

=== Transfer to Karelia ===
In February the weakened division was reassigned to 23rd Army, which was stationed in the Karelian Isthmus, facing the Finnish Army near Beloostrov and Lembolovo as it was gradually rebuilt. On August 16 it came under Red Army command and was redesignated as the new 92nd Rifle Division. According to Sharp another 20th NKVD Division was formed in 1942 at Kuibyshev in the Volga Military District, but this was strictly a security unit and may have simply been an administrative headquarters as it never served at the front.
