= Battle of Porlampi =

1941 battle of the Continuation War

- Part of Continuation War
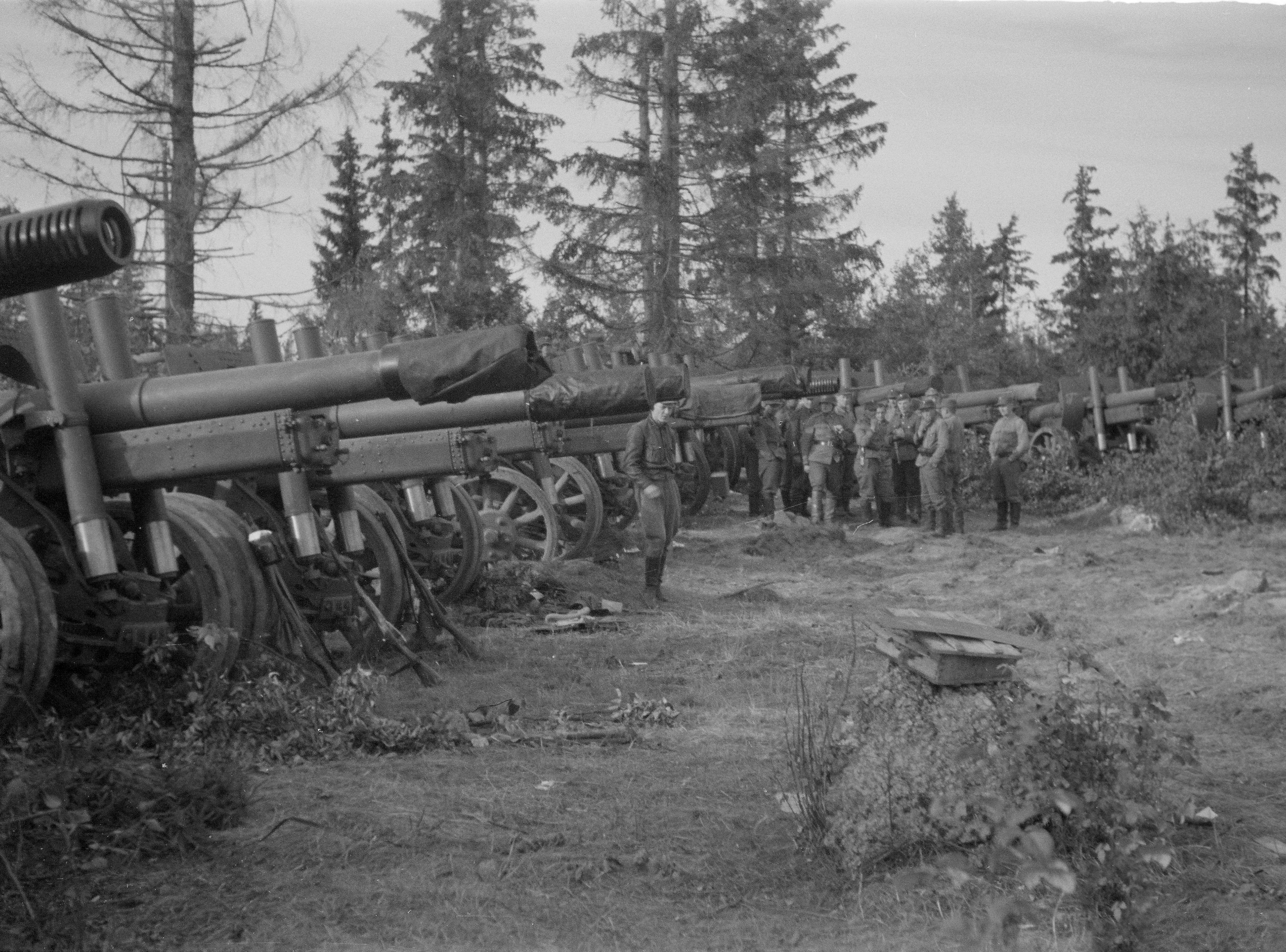
- Soviet artillery pieces of the 101st Howitzer Artillery Regiment captured at Porlampi
Date	30 August – 1 September 1941 (2 days)
Location	Porlampi, Karelo-Finnish SSR
Result	Finnish victory

Belligerents
Finland	Soviet Union

Commanders and leaders
(Finland) Paavo Talvela (Finland) Karl Lennart Oesch	(Soviet Union) Mikhail Gerasimov (Soviet Union) Vladimir Kirpichnikov (POW) (Soviet Union) Filipp Starikov

Units involved
(Finland) IV Corps	(Soviet Union) 23rd Army

Strength
43,000	35,000

Casualties and losses
3,400: 700 killed; 2,700 wounded	17,000+: 7,000 killed; 1,000+ wounded; 9,000 captured

The Battle of Porlampi, also known as the Battle of Porlammi, was a military engagement fought between the Finnish Army and Red Army from 30 August to 1 September 1941 on the Karelian Isthmus. The battle was fought near the town of Porlampi during the second month of the Continuation War. The battle was a Finnish victory and effectively ended the reconquest of Karelia.

== Background ==
=== Winter War ===
Territorial disputes between the Soviet Union and Finland caused the outbreak of the Winter War in November 1939. Several months of fighting ensued, during which the Red Army was able to push back the Finnish defenders on the Karelian Isthmus. Located on the main road to the vital port of Vyborg, the town of Porlampi was occupied by the Soviets in March 1940 following the Battle of Summa.

Following the end of the Winter War in March 1940, Finland was forced to cede part of Karelia to the Soviet Union, with Porlampi being one of the territories handed over.

=== Continuation War ===
On 22 June 1941 the German Wehrmacht launched Operation Barbarossa, the planned invasion of the Soviet Union. Prior to the commencement of Barbarossa, Finnish and German officers had planned for possible Finnish participation in the war against the Soviet Union. Finland mobilized 16 infantry divisions, one cavalry brigade, and two jäger brigades of the Finnish Army to the newly established border with the Soviets on 21 June, and on 22 June conducted Operation Kilpapurjehdus, an action that violated the Moscow Peace Treaty. That same day, German naval bombers began mining the waters around Leningrad, with some of the aircraft being deployed from airfields in Finland. On 25 June a flight of Soviet bombers struck at airfields in Finland, and Soviet artillery stationed in Hanko fired on Finnish targets.

With the border situation growing more volatile, the Finnish Army prepared to enter the widening conflict. On 29 June Carl Gustaf Emil Mannerheim, Marshal of Finland, formed the Army of Karelia under the command of Erik Heinrichs. Combat operations against the Red Army and Air-force commenced on 1 July, and war was declared that same day. The first Finnish offensive into Ladoga Karelia began on 10 July, a move that split the zones of Soviet occupation in Karelia into separate fronts. Despite Finnish success in other areas, the IV Corps was unable to begin its advance against the Soviets until the II Corps reached the northern shore of Lake Ladoga on 9 August.

Once the offensive began, the objective of the IV Corps was the recapture of the town of Vyborg. Plans were made to begin an offensive on 15 August, but movement by Soviet troops changed the situation. The Soviet 23rd Army withdrew some of its divisions from the Finnish border, seeking to use the narrow part of the Karelian Isthmus to better utilize their numerical superiority for defense. The Finns postponed their offensive until the Soviets had abandoned their fortifications, finally striking on 21 August. The Finnish plan had been modified as the situation changed; rather than assault Vyborg, the IV Corps would now maneuver around the northern flank of the city and pursue the withdrawing Soviets to the Vuoksi River.

The main body of the Finnish IV Corps crossed the border to the north of Vyborg on 22 August, and continued to advance towards the Vuoksi River in the opening days of the offensive. On 24 August the Finnish 8th Division crossed Viipuri Bay, landing to the south of Vyborg and cutting the coastal road to the city. Hoping to re-establish the road link to Vyborg, the Soviet 43rd, 115th and 123rd Rifle Divisions launched a counter-offensive directed at the Finnish 8th Division. Though heavily outnumbered, Finnish Light Brigade T stalled the Soviets for a few crucial hours while IV Corps advanced southward on 25 August. For the next few days both armies drew up their forces and prepared for an engagement in the heavily forested terrain around the town of Porlampi, which was positioned between the coastal and central Karelian highways.

== Battle ==
The battle commenced when advanced elements of the Soviet 43rd Rifle Division encountered the Finnish 8th Division in the forests around Porlampi on 30 August. Both sides called for reinforcements. The Soviets were unaware (or only partially aware) that the Finnish soldiers they were fighting had crossed Viipuri Bay, and it was incorrectly assumed that the 8th Division was part of the main body of the IV Corps—in reality, IV Corps was advancing unopposed to the north and east of the Soviet divisions, threatening to swing south and partially encircle the Soviet forces.

In the several days of fighting that ensued in the Porlampi area, the Finns employed motitus skirmishing tactics, in which lighter Finnish units maneuvered around the enemy and entrapped them in tight, indefensible positions ("motti") that could then be isolated and defeated. The use of these tactics allowed the Finns to counter oftentimes larger Soviet units. The Finnish artillery was reported to have been particularly effective during the engagement as it disabled many soviet vehicles, blocking roads and creating bottlenecks. Late in the day on 30 August the 43rd Rifle Division pushed the 8th Division out of Porlampi and into the nearby village of Somme, which lay several miles to the northwest. There the fighting continued throughout the night. On the morning of 31 August the main body of the IV Corps arrived, attacking the 123rd Rifle Division at Porlampi and the 115th Rifle Division at Ylasomme, an action which collapsed the north flank of the Soviet army. The Soviets were forced back, and the Finnish forces made ready to encircle them. However, the 8th Division was still engaged in heavy fighting with the 43rd Rifle Division to the northwest of town and was unable to complete the encirclement. Using the heavily forested terrain to their advantage, the Soviet 123rd and 115th Rifle Divisions withdrew southwest towards Koivisto. Vyborg fell on 31 August, freeing up more Finnish forces to engage the remaining forces of the 23rd Army. The 43rd Rifle Division, which had advanced furthest west, was almost completely destroyed by the Finnish forces on 1 September. Some survivors retreated to the south and were evacuated from the Baltic coast by the Soviet Navy in November.

=== Casualties ===
The Red Army suffered 7000 killed, 1000 wounded and 9000 captured, predominantly from the destroyed 43rd Rifle Division. The Finnish IV Corps lost 700 killed and 2700 wounded. The Finns seized a vast quantity of Soviet equipment at the battle, including 164 artillery pieces of various calibers. The Finns also managed to capture Major general Vladimir Kirpichnikov, who was the highest-ranking Soviet POW captured during the Winter War and the Continuation War.

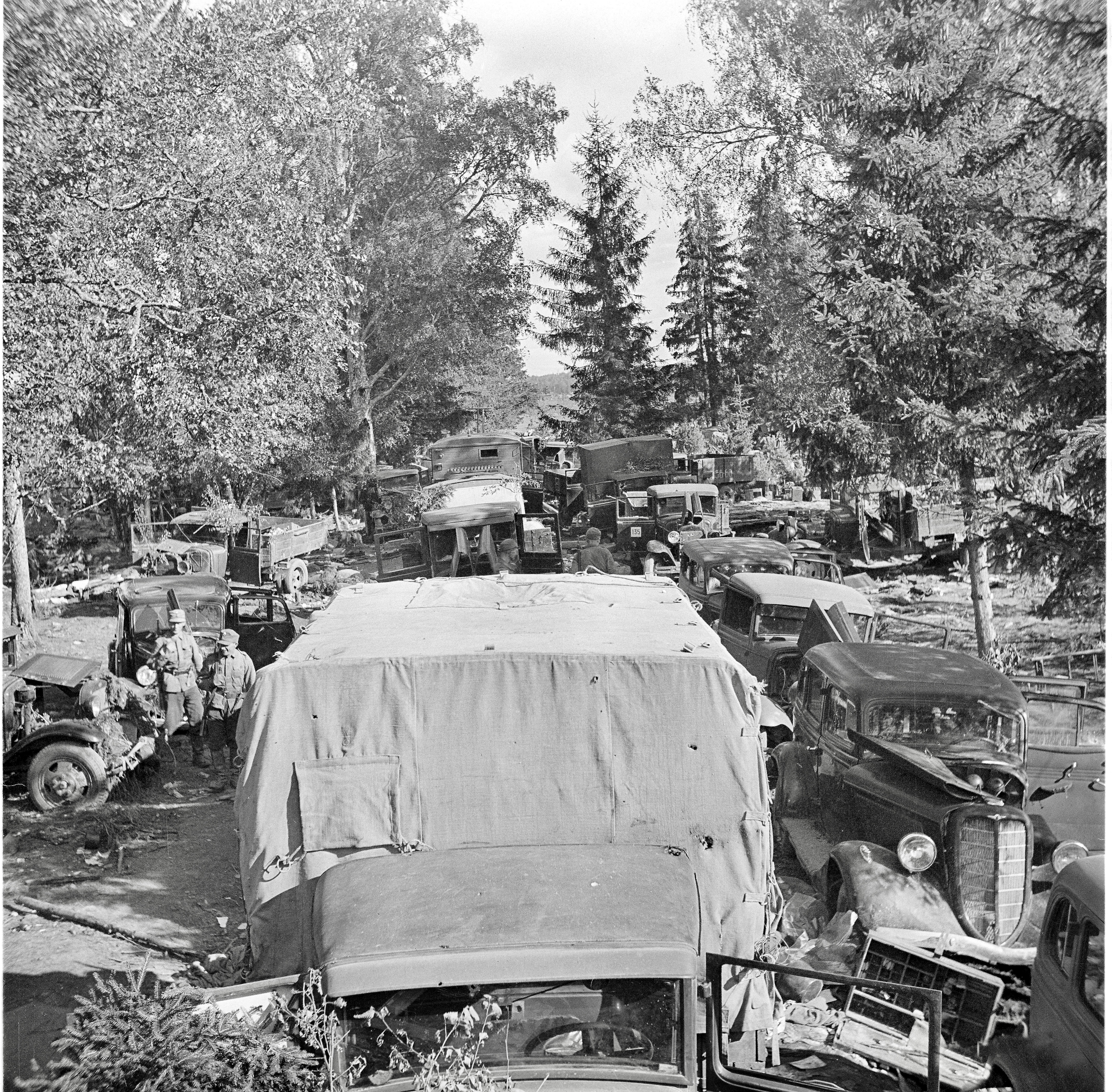
Soviet equipment abandoned after the encirclement at Porlampi

== Aftermath ==
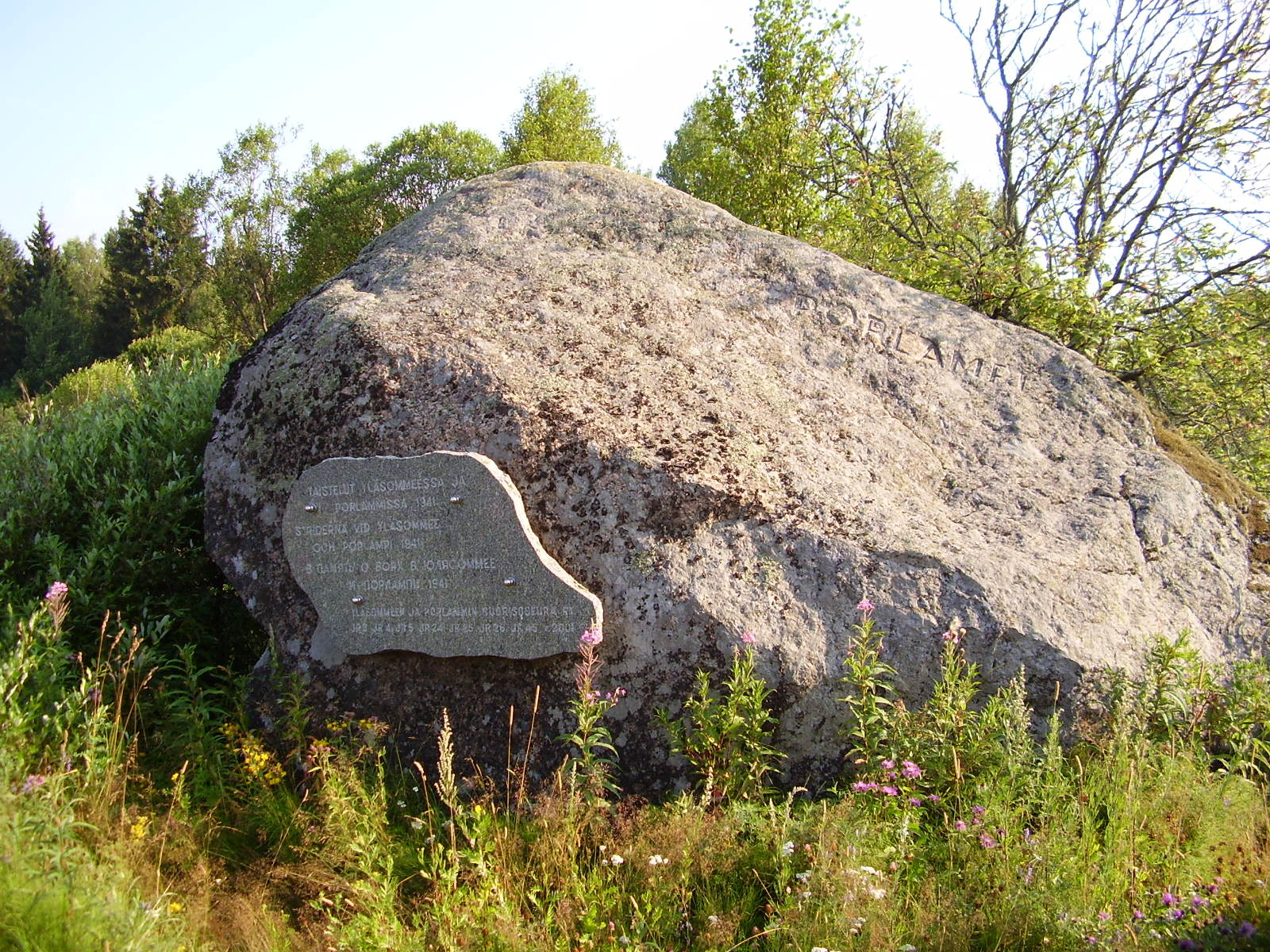
Present day stone monument commemorating the battle

The Finnish Army advanced towards Koivisto after the victory at Porlampi, capturing the port on 2 September. The Finnish Army declined a German proposal to attack Leningrad, and the offensive was ended on 5 September.

A memorial dedicated to the casualties of the battle stands outside of the modern town, known as Sveklovichnoye since 1948. The memorial consists of a boulder inscribed with the date and outcome of the battle.

== Bibliography ==
- Nenye, Vesa; Munter, Peter; Wirtanen, Tony; Birks, Chris (2016). Finland at War: The Continuation and Lapland Wars 1941–45. Osprey Publishing. ISBN 978-1-4728-1526-2.
- 1936-, Lunde, Henrik O. (Lunde, Henrik Olai), (2011-01-01). Finland's war of choice: the troubled German-Finnish coalition in WWII. Casemate.ISBN 9781612000374. OCLC 768970208.
- Trotter, William R. (2002) [1991]. The Winter War: The Russo–Finnish War of 1939–40 (5th ed.). New York (Great Britain: London): Workman Publishing Company (Great Britain: Aurum Press). ISBN 1-85410-881-6. First published in the United States under the title A Frozen Hell: The Russo–Finnish Winter War of 1939–40.
- Ed Antti Juutilainen: "Vyborg operation", the Continuation War, the little giant. Porvoo: ISBN 978-951-0-28690-6
