= 19th Rifle Corps =

- Allegiance: Soviet Union
- Branch: Soviet Red Army
- Engagements: Eastern Front (World War II); Operation Barbarossa

The 19th Rifle Corps was a corps of the Soviet Red Army.

The 1st Pacific Rifle Division was shifted into the 19th Rifle Corps of the Siberian Military District in June 1929 after the 5th Red Banner Army of the RSFSR was disbanded. In August 1929 the 1st Pacific Rifle Division was transferred again, to the Special Far Eastern Army.

The 19th Rifle Corps was part of the 23rd Army. After June 1941 it fought again the German invasion (Operation Barbarossa).

== Divisions ==
- 142nd Rifle Division
- 115th Rifle Division

== Commanders ==
- Kombrig Vsevolod Yakovlev (14.07.1937 - 8.01.1938),
- Major General Filipp Starikov (01.09.1938 -01.01.1940)
- Lieutenant General M.N. Gerasimov (09.07.1940 - 05.08.1941),
- Major General Filipp Starikov (06.08.1941 - 22.09.1941)
- Major General Mikhail Dukhanov (04.10.1941 - 24.10.1941)
