= Kilpola =

Island on Lake Ladoga, Russia

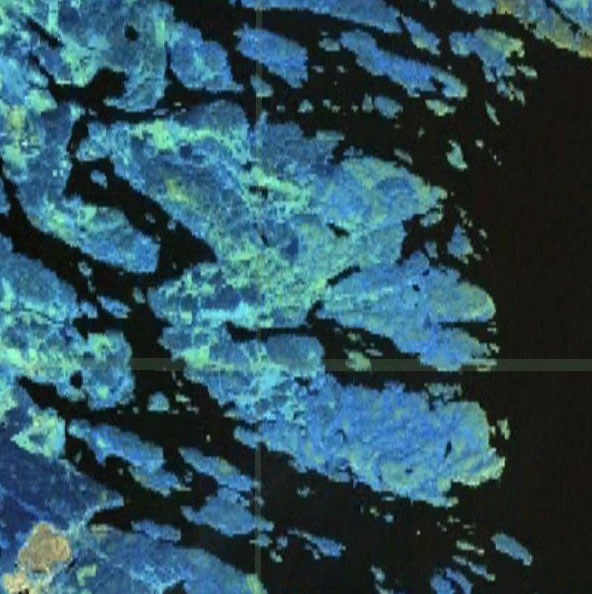
- Interactive map of Kilpola

Geography
- Location: Lake Ladoga
- Coordinates: 61°11′N 29°58′E
- Highest elevation: 60 m (200 ft)

Administration
- Russia
- Republic: Karelia

Kilpola (Russian: Кильпола; Finnish: Kilpolansaari) is an island 6 x 8 km among the skerries in the northwestern part of the Lake Ladoga, in Lakhdenpokhsky District of Republic of Karelia, connected to the mainland by a bridge. It is composed of granite hills rising up to about 60 m. above sea-level (55 m above the level of the lake) and covered by Scots Pine forest. There are several lakes on the island.
