= 5th Division (Finland, Winter War) =

The 5th Division was a unit of the Finnish Army during the Winter War. It was part of the II Corps (II AK) which fought on the Karelian Isthmus as part of the Army of the Isthmus. It was stationed on the Mannerheim Line between Lake Muolaanjärvi and Kuolemajärvi.

== Formation ==
The 5th Division consisted of the following units:

- 13th Infantry Regiment (JR13)
- 14th Infantry Regiment (JR14)
- 15th Infantry Regiment (JR15)
- 5th Field Artillery Regiment (KTR5)

== Commanders ==
Colonel Selim Isakson 30 November 1939 – 13 March 1940
