= Finnish invasion of the Karelian Isthmus =

Finnish offensive during the Continuation War

Coordinates: 60.5°N 29.9°E

Reconquest of the Karelian Isthmus
- Part of the Continuation War
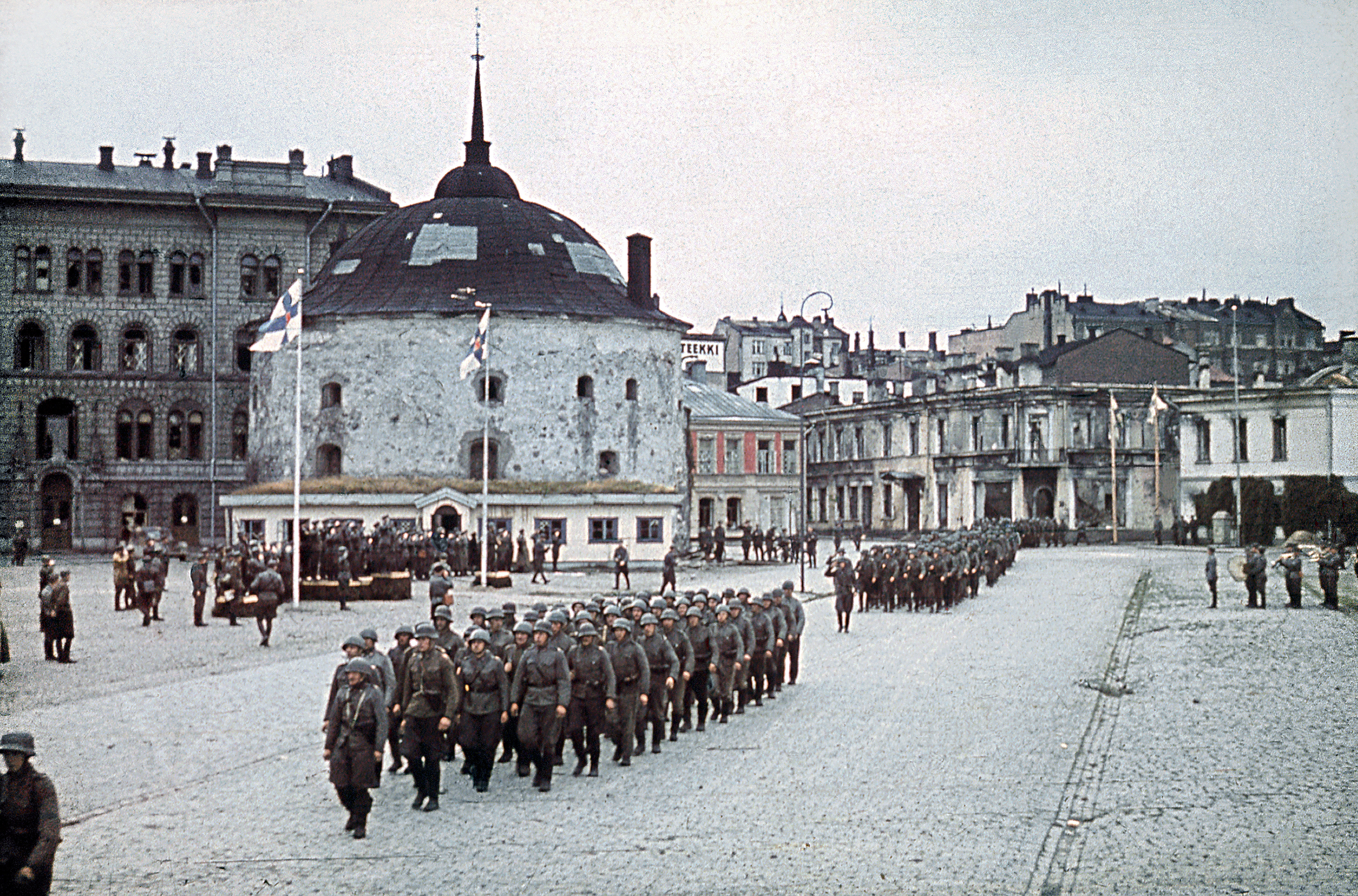
- Military parade in Viipuri on 31 August 1941, after its recapture.
Date	31 July – 5 September 1941 (1 month and 5 days)
Location	Karelian Isthmus, Soviet Union
Result	Finnish victory

Belligerents
Finland	Soviet Union

Commanders and leaders
(Finland) Erik Heinrichs (Finland) Karl Lennart Oesch (Finland) Taavetti Laatikainen	(Soviet Union) Markian Popov (Soviet Union) P.S. Pshennikov (Soviet Union) M.N. Gerasimov

Strength
3 Corps	3 Corps

The Finnish invasion of the Karelian Isthmus refers to a military campaign carried out by Finland in 1941. It was part of what is commonly referred to as the Continuation War. Early in the war, Finnish forces captured the Karelian Isthmus. It had been ceded to the Soviet Union on 13 March 1940, in the Moscow Peace Treaty, which marked the end of the Winter War. Later, in the summer of 1944, the Soviet Union recaptured the southern part of the isthmus in the Vyborg–Petrozavodsk Offensive.

== Initial setup of the forces ==
The Finnish forces facing the Karelian Isthmus consisted of two Finnish army corps. The Finnish II Corps was north of the river Vuoksi and the Finnish IV Corps south of it. The Finnish II Corps was commanded by Major-General Taavetti Laatikainen and it consisted of three divisions (the 10th, 15th and 18th divisions) as the 10th Division had been added to it after the II Corps had been forced to give the 2nd Division over to operations in Ladoga Karelia. The Finnish IV Corps was commanded by Lieutenant General Karl Lennart Oesch and had two divisions and a reinforced regiment placed at the front lines (the 8th and 12th divisions together with the reinforced 25th Infantry Regiment) and a single division (4th Division) as its reserve.

When the operation started, the defending Soviet forces consisted nominally of two separate army corps (the 19th and 50th corps). The Soviet 19th Corps consisted of two divisions (the 115th and 142nd divisions), one motorized division (the 198th Motorized Division) and a motorized regiment (the 14th Motorized Rifle Regiment). The Soviet 198th Motorized Division was tied down in fighting near Sortavala while the two other divisions manned the positions close to the border. The Soviet 265th Rifle Division was en route to act as the reserve. The relatively quiet front prompted the Soviet leadership to transfer the command elements of the 50th Corps south of Leningrad on 21 July leaving its divisions (the 43rd and 123rd Rifle Divisions) under the direct command of the Soviet 23rd Army.

== Advance to Lake Ladoga ==
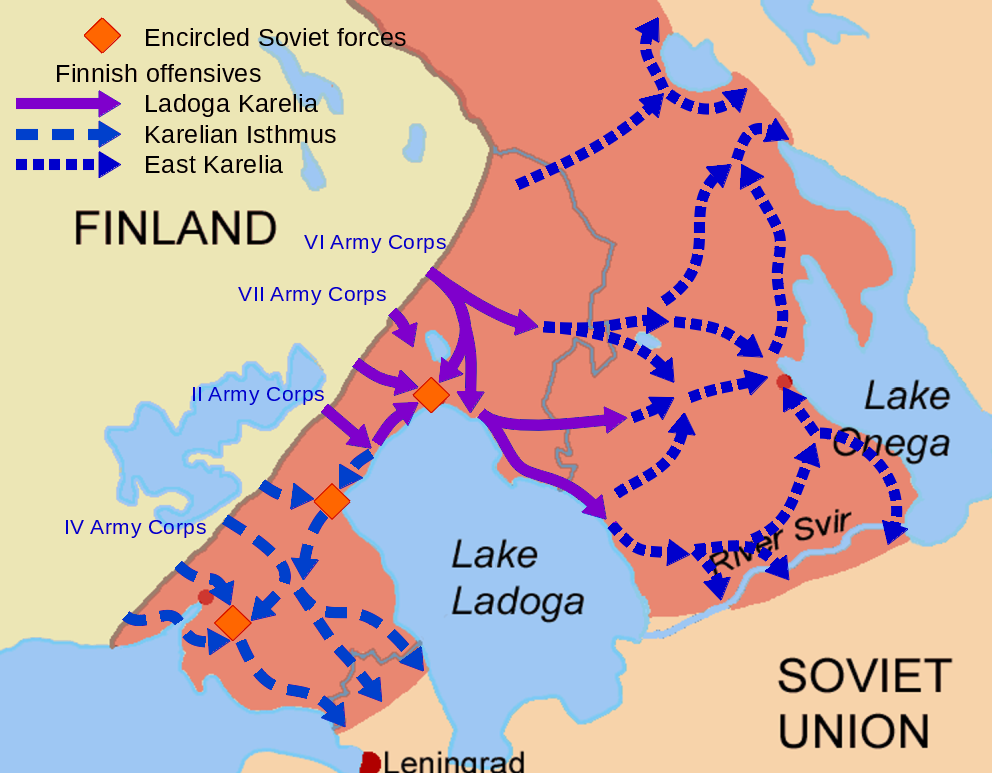
Map depicting the Finnish offensive operations in Karelia carried out in the Summer and Autumn of 1941 during the Continuation War. The furthest advance of Finnish units in the Continuation War and borders for both before and after the Winter War are shown.

The advance of the Finnish II Corps started on 31 July. Soviet defenses slowed down the Finnish advance, especially due to the Finnish tactic of advancing through forest, which caused severe logistical problems. By 14 August the Finnish 18th Division captured the town and crossing point of Antrea, which left the Soviet 115th Rifle Division separated from the rest of the Soviet 19th Corps. Advancing in terrain that had almost no useful roads also slowed the Finnish 15th Division's advance and it only managed to capture the town of Hiitola on 11 August after the Finnish 10th Division was also deployed to the front lines. The Finnish victory at Hiitola forced the Soviet 142nd Rifle and 198th Motorized Divisions to withdraw into the Kilpola islands, where they were surrounded into a motti against the shore of Lake Ladoga. The Finns cleared the motti by 23 August, but by then the Soviets had already evacuated over Lake Ladoga 26,000 men from the encirclement.

The Soviet control of the Karelian Isthmus near Lake Ladoga was crumbling after the defeat of the two Soviet divisions. The Finnish 10th Division came across the newly arrived Soviet 265th Division on 15 August and after the ensuing battle encircled the remains of the Soviet division. A small part of the 265th Division managed to escape two days later; by that time the division's casualties already amounted to 234 dead, 1155 wounded and 4830 missing in action. The Finnish victories allowed the Finnish forces to act more freely, and the Finns captured the remains of the town of Käkisalmi on 21 August and the village of Taipale on 23 August. The Finnish 18th Division started its crossing of the Vuoksi on 17 August and managed to create a solid bridgehead.

== Capture of Viipuri ==
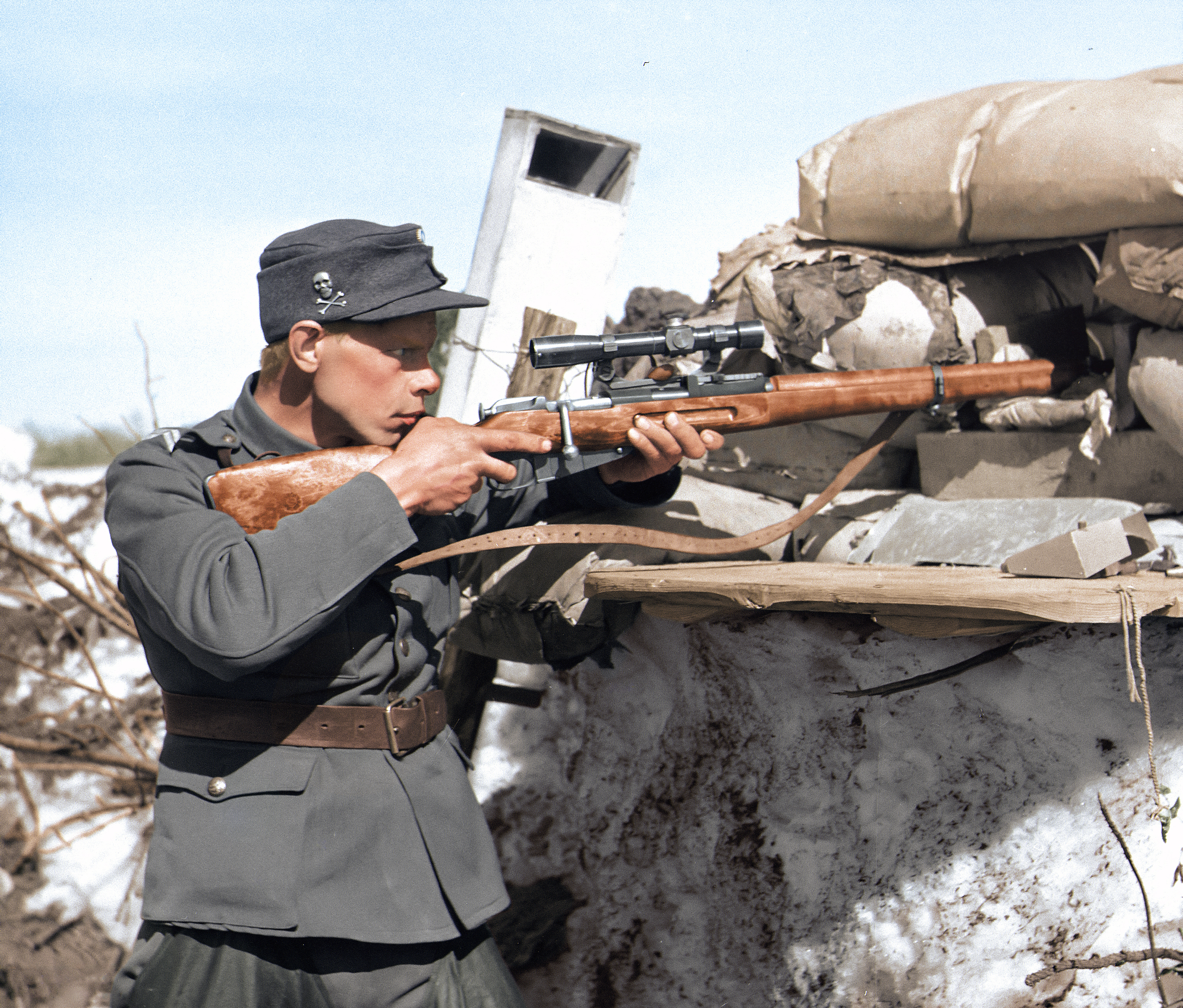
Corporal Onni Ryyppö posing with his sniper rifle for the cameraman in the frontlines at Valkeasaari (Beloostrov), Karelian isthmus, April 1942

The main objective for the Finnish IV Corps was the city of Viipuri, and the plan called for surrounding and quickly capturing the town. However, the Finnish General HQ did not allow IV Corps to start actively pursuing the Soviets until 21 August. By this time the Soviet 43rd and 123rd Rifle Divisions had already started withdrawing from their exposed positions close to the border, while the Soviet 115th Rifle Division was racing to contain the Finnish crossing of the Vuoksi. This meant that the Finnish plan of tying down the Soviets had failed before it even could have been put to action. However the crossing of the Vuoksi by the Finnish 18th Division of the II Corps was assisted by the Finnish 12th Division and the Light Brigade T (which was named after its commander, Colonel Tiiainen, and consisted of the 1st Jaeger Battalion, two light detachments and two artillery companies) of the IV Corps which managed to punch through the Soviet lines.

The Soviet withdrawal to the narrow part of the Karelian Isthmus allowed the Soviets to bring their numbers to bear. The Soviet 115th and 123rd Rifle Divisions were tasked with throwing the Finnish back over the Vuoksi and their attack started on 24 August. The Soviet attack hit the Finnish Light Brigade T and forced the Finns to either retreat or to dig in. As a result, the Finnish brigade was immobilized and partially surrounded. On 25 August a chance artillery strike killed the Light Brigade T's commander, but then the Finnish forces relieving Light Brigade T turned back the attack and forced the Soviet divisions to retreat. The Finnish IV Corps proceeded to cut the routes south from Viipuri. On 24 August the Finnish 8th Division crossed Viipuri Bay and cut the coastal route from Viipuri. Finnish forces captured Viipuri on 29 August.

By 28 August the Soviet 43rd, 115th and 123rd Rifle Divisions had been encircled at the Battle of Porlampi into a motti around the villages of Sommee and Porlampi. The Finns had cut all the roads to the motti, but they were unable to form a tight blockade in the thick forests, which allowed the majority of the men of the Soviet 115th and 123rd Rifle Divisions to escape towards Koivisto. However, the bulk of the Soviet 43rd Rifle Division was destroyed at the Battle of Porlammi on 1 September. The Finns' force marched to the village and port of Koivisto on 2 September, but did not pursue the remnants of the Soviet divisions which had fled to the surrounding archipelago – these units were later, in November, evacuated by the Soviets. While the fighting near Viipuri was still ongoing, the Finnish advance towards Leningrad continued. The Finnish IV Corps was to advance along the western shore, the II Corps in the center and the newly arrived I Corps along the eastern side of the Isthmus. The Finnish commander in chief, Marshal Mannerheim, ordered the Finnish advance to hold their ground short of the Soviet fortifications. The Finnish forces reached the old border on 31 August and in early September the Soviet fortifications, where the Finns stopped their advance.

== German pressure to attack Leningrad and the end of offensive ==
On 20 August, General W. Erfurth notified Mannerheim that Field Marshal Wilhelm Keitel would send a letter describing where Finns would be asked to attack Leningrad. Mannerheim explained the practical difficulties of the proposal and presented the opposition of both the political and military leadership to this attack. The government had decided beforehand that Finland would not attack Leningrad, and it was only after pressure from the military leadership that they accepted a small advance across the old border to capture better defensive positions. The Social Democrats especially opposed crossing the border. When Keitel's letter came, Ryti and Mannerheim together prepared a negative answer. On 31 August, Erfurth contacted Mannerheim again and proposed that Finns should cancel the attack to East Karelia and instead attack Leningrad. Ryti and Mannerheim again refused. On 31 August Mannerheim gave the order that the attack be stopped at the line from the mouth of the river Rajajoki to Ohta. The exact line between Ohta and Lake Ladoga would be ordered later, when the Finns had reached the old border there. That would shorten the frontline without the need to attack Soviet fortifications north of Leningrad (the KaUR). In this last phase, the Soviets had six infantry divisions and a number of separate battalions and regiments defending Leningrad from the north, but all of them were at half strength due to the hard fighting with the Finns.

The Finnish 12th Division had reached the target already on 1 September, but elsewhere the attack started on 2 September. The 18th Division captured Mainila at the same day and Beloostrov (Valkeasaari) the next day. By 7 September both the 18th and the 2nd Divisions had reached their targets between the Rajajoki and Ohta. The commander of I Corps, Colonel Mäkinen, ordered his troops to advance to the line Ohta-Lake Lempaalanjärvi-Old border at Lake Ladoga with an addition, that if strong defences were met, the offensive could be stopped there. On 4 September the attack began, and on 6 September the 10th Division managed to encircle and destroy the Soviet 941st Rifle Regiment at Kirjasalo. Finally on 9 September the objective line was reached everywhere and Finnish forces moved to the defensive.

The Soviet military leadership quickly learned of lessened Finnish pressure, and already on 5 September two divisions were transferred from the Karelian Isthmus to the south of the city, against the Germans. Although the Finnish troops on the Karelian Isthmus did not actively participate in the Siege of Leningrad, merely their existence contributed to the siege by hampering the supply of the city around and across Lake Ladoga.

Half of the Finnish part of the Isthmus was reconquered by the Soviet Union in the Fourth strategic offensive in 1944.

== See also ==
- Finnish invasion of Ladoga Karelia
