= Pyotr Pshennikov =

Soviet lieutenant general

Pyotr Stepanovitch Pshennikov (Russian: Пётр Степанович Пшенников, Moscow, 28 January 1895 – Trosnyansky District, 28 December 1941) was a Soviet Lieutenant-General (1940).

== Biography ==
Pshennikov participated in the First World War and the Russian Civil War. From 1925 until 1927, he was commander of the 29th Infantry Division. On 19 August 1939, he was appointed commander of the newly formed 142nd Rifle Division of the Leningrad Military District. With his division, he participated in the Winter War against Finland. His actions in February 1940, to force Lake Suvanto in the vicinity of the village of Volossula, were highly appreciated by the High command. In April 1940, P.S. Pshennikov became the commander of the 36th Rifle Corps and a month later, on 25 May 1941, General Pshennikov was appointed commander of the 23rd Army.

At the start of the Second World War in June 1941, his 23rd Army was part of the Northern Front and fought without success against the Finnish invasion of the Karelian Isthmus. He was replaced as commander on 6 August and on 1 September 1, 1941 he became commander of the 8th Army that had been pushed out of the Baltics by the Germans. The troops under his command took part in defensive battles in the Leningrad Strategic Defensive on the approaches to Leningrad.

On 22 September, General Pshennikov was appointed commander of the Neva Operational Group on the Leningrad Front. Parts of the group were able to cross the Neva River and capture a bridgehead in the area of the village of Nevskaya Dubrovka, which became known as the Nevsky Pyatachok. It was not possible to develop an offensive from the bridgehead and extremely fierce battles were continuously raging on it. At the end of September, the 10th rifle brigade of Colonel V.N. Fedorov from the Neva operational group in the Otradny district suffered heavy losses, and its commander died. Georgy Zhukov (at that time commanding the Leningrad Front) considered Pshennikov's excuses unconvincing and on 6 October 1941 Pshennikov was dismissed from his post and replaced by Major General V.F. Konkov. About two months P. Pshennikov was at the disposal of the headquarters of the Red Army.

On 13 December 1941, P.S. Pshennikov was appointed commander of the 3rd Army of the Bryansk Front. Under his command, the army advanced in the direction of Oryol. But already 2 weeks later, General Pshennikov was killed when his car was blown up in a minefield.

He was buried in Voronezh, in the mass grave of Soviet soldiers No. 14.

== Sources ==
- Generals.dk
- the article in the Russian Wikipedia, Пшенников, Пётр Степанович.
