= 23rd Army (Soviet Union) =

- 23-я армия
- Active: 1941–1948
- Country: Soviet Union
- Branch: Red Army
- Type: Combined arms
- Size: Field Army; Three Corps and additional units
- Engagements: Invasion of Karelian Isthmus; Vyborg–Petrozavodsk Offensive

Commanders
- Notable commanders: Lieutenant-General M. N. Gerasimov; Lieutenant-General A. I. Cherepanov; Lieutenant-General V. I. Shvetsov

The 23rd Army (Russian: 23-я армия) was a Field Army of the Soviet Union's Red Army.

Formed in May 1941 in Karelia, it fought in the Continuation War against Finland in the Karelian Isthmus and defended the northwestern approaches to Leningrad during World War II. After Finland withdrew from World War II in September 1944, the Army remained on the Finnish border and continued to garrison the Karelian Isthmus after the war until it was disbanded in 1948.

== World War II ==
The Army was formed in May 1941 in the Leningrad Military District for the defence of the southernmost part of the Soviet Union's border with Finland, north and northeast of Vyborg. The 7th Army was located on its right flank.

The Army initially included the 19th and 50th Rifle Corps, the 10th Mechanized Corps (which included the 21st Tank Division, the 24th Tank Division and the 198th Motorized Division), the 27th Vyborg Fortified Region, the 28th Keksgolm Fortified Region, plus artillery and other units.

On 24 June, the Army was included in the Northern Front. At the beginning of 10 July the Mechanised Corps was removed from the Army. From 31 July to the end of August in facing the Finnish offensive, it was unable to stop the Finns reconquering the Karelian Isthmus and thus the Army fell back to the old border line and occupied positions in the 22nd Karelian Fortified Region. During the campaign, the army (more specifically the 43rd Rifle Division) was decisively defeated at the Battle of Porlampi.

Due to a reorganization, the army was transferred to the Leningrad Front on 24 August. The 23rd Army had suffered enormous losses in battles against Finns in July to August 1941. When the Finnish Army halted the offensive on the command of Field Marshal Mannerheim on 1 September, the army consisted of only 80,000–90,000 men and had lost huge amounts of heavy weapons and material to the Finns. If Finland had not halted its attack and continued moving towards Leningrad, the 23rd Army probably would have had to withdraw to the city of Leningrad.

From 1942 to June 1944 the Army defended North Western approaches to Leningrad. In June 1944, the Army, including the 97th, 98th and 115th Rifle Corps, and the 17th Izyaslavsky Fortified Region and other units, participated in the Vyborg offensive operation (10 June – 15 July 1944). In this operation, the 23rd Army followed the breakthrough of the 21st Army in this operation, cleared the southern bank of the Vuoksi river and crossed the river in the Battle of Vuosalmi. After the termination of combat with Finland the Army formations were brought out to the state border against Finland, where they were located to the end of the war.

On 1 May 1945, operating under the Leningrad Front, the Army consisted of the 97th Rifle Corps (177th, 178th, 224th Rifle Divisions), the 9th, 16th, 17th Fortified Regions, the 47th Guards Gun Artillery Brigade, the 8th Guards and 21st Gun Artillery Regiments, the 94th Anti-Tank Artillery Regiment, the 174th Mortar Regiment, the 24th Guards Rocket Artillery Regiment, the 1469th Anti-Aircraft Artillery Regiment, the 71st, 168th, 177th, and 618th Separate Anti-Aircraft Artillery Battalions, the 14th Separate Armored Train Battalion, the 172nd Separate Engineer Battalion, and the 67th Separate Minesweeper Engineer Battalion.

== Postwar ==
On 9 July 1945, the Leningrad Front became the Leningrad Military District. In the postwar period, the Army initially included the 14th and 30th Guards Rifle Corps. The latter had relocated to Vyborg on 10 June after it was transferred from the 10th Guards Army, and it included the 45th, 63rd, and 64th Guards Rifle Divisions. In August, the 14th Guards Rifle Corps was transferred to the Kharkov Military District. By 1 October, along with the 30th Guards Rifle Corps, the army included the 9th, 16th, 17th, and 22nd Fortified Regions. The fortified regions had become the 1st and 22nd Machine Gun Artillery Brigades by 1 August 1946. In April 1948, the Army's headquarters was disbanded, and its units became directly subordinate to the district headquarters.

== Commanding officers ==
The following officers commanded the 23rd Army:

- Lieutenant-General Pyotr Pshennikov (25 May – 6 August 1941)
- Lieutenant-General M.N. Gerasimov (6 August – 8 September 1941)
- Major-General A. I. Cherepanov (9 September 1941 – 3 July 1944; promoted Lieutenant General in September 1943)
- Lieutenant-General Vasily Shvetsov (3 July 1944 – April 1948)
