= Sveklovichnoye =

Rural locality in Vyborgsky District, Russia

Coordinates: 60°35′33″N 28°47′28″E

Sveklovichnoye (Russian: Свеклови́чное) is a rural locality (a settlement) in Vyborgsky District of Leningrad Oblast, Russia, located on the Karelian Isthmus.

It was the site of the Battle of Porlampi, an engagement fought between Finland and the Soviet Union in 1941 during the Continuation War.

Before 1948, it was known as Porlampi.
