= 142nd Rifle Division =

142nd Rifle Division (August 19, 1939 – July 1945)
- Active: 1939–1945
- Country: Soviet Union
- Branch: Red Army
- Type: Infantry
- Size: Division
- Engagements: Winter War; Battle of Taipale; Finnish invasion of the Karelian Isthmus; Siege of Leningrad; Vyborg–Petrozavodsk offensive Battle of Vuosalmi; Vistula–Oder offensive East Pomeranian offensive
- Decorations: Order of the Red Banner
- Battle honours: Graudenz

Commanders
- Notable commanders: Kombrig Pyotr Stepanovich Pshennikov; Maj. Gen. Semyon Petrovich Mikulskii; Col. Vladimir Kuzmich Paramzin; Maj. Gen. Ivan Danilovich Romantsov; Col. Grigorii Leontevich Sonnikov

The 142nd Rifle Division was formed as an infantry division of the Red Army in August 1939 in the Leningrad Military District, based on the shtat (table of organization and equipment) of the following month. It participated in the Winter War against Finland as part of 7th Army on the Karelian Isthmus, taking heavy casualties in the fighting for Taipale on the east end of the Mannerheim Line, but gained enough distinction to be awarded the Order of the Red Banner. It remained on the Karelian Isthmus and had a relatively uneventful war facing the Finns until the Vyborg–Petrozavodsk Offensive began on June 10, 1944, from which point it saw much more active service. Attacking northward from much the same place it had begun in the Winter War, now as part of Leningrad Front's 23rd Army, it soon reached the Vuoksi River where it helped stage a successful crossing operation on July 9, and eight of its soldiers became Heroes of the Soviet Union. Shortly after it went on the defense and in September entered the Reserve of the Supreme High Command in preparation for moving to Poland for the final offensive on Germany. The 142nd became part of 2nd Shock Army in 2nd Belorussian Front; its soldiers distinguished themselves in the capture of the German city of Graudenz and later Gdańsk after fighting through northern Poland and Pomerania. As part of the Northern Group of Forces it was disbanded in July 1945.

== Formation ==
The division began forming on August 19, 1939, at Malaya Vishera, north of Leningrad, the area where it would spend most of the war. It was based on a rifle regiment of the 49th Rifle Division. Col. Pyotr Stepanovich Pshennikov took command on the day the division formed, and he would be promoted to the rank of Kombrig on November 4. This officer had commanded at brigade and regimental level during the Russian Civil War, and since then had led the 29th Rifle Division before going into reserve; called up again, he had most recently been head of the Leningrad Advanced Training Course for reserve officers. Col. Semyon Petrovich Mikulskii served as his chief of staff.

== Winter War ==
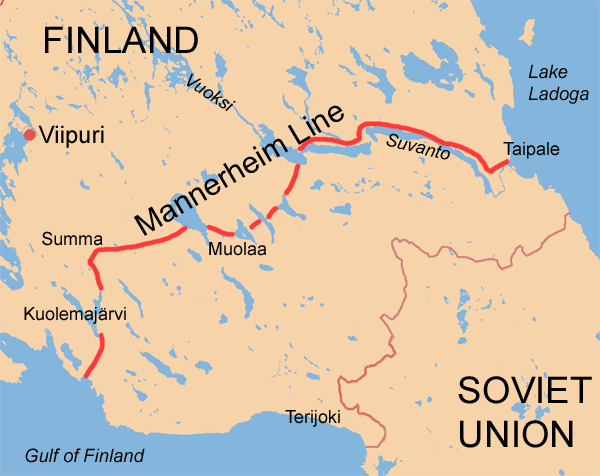
Position of Taipale at eastern end of Mannerheim Line.

On November 30 the Winter War with Finland began. The 142nd was part of the Right Wing Operational Group under Komkor V. D. Grendal operated on the eastern flank of 7th Army, near Lake Ladoga. The Group also contained the 49th and 150th Rifle Divisions. On the second day the division occupied Rautu. By December 4 the lead elements of the Operational Group had reached the Mannerheim Line, which was closer to the border on this sector than others. The Finnish commander-in-chief, Marshal C. G. E. Mannerheim, had expected the Soviet forces to first attempt to break the line at Summa, in an effort to reach Viipuri, but in the event Grendal's troops went over to the attack against the Finnish 10th Infantry Division late on December 6 after the artillery had come up.

The 10th Infantry occupied positions north of the frozen Suvanto Waterway and Taipale River, which also contained several coastal artillery batteries. At the confluence of the waterways was a peninsula some 3km wide and 5km long called Koukunniemi. This had been abandoned by the Finns as it was low, marshy, and devoid of cover; they had instead dug in on slightly elevated ground at its base. The Soviet attack started with a heavy artillery preparation lasting four hours. In the advance by the 49th and 150th Divisions that followed an attempt to seize the ferry crossing site at Lossi failed. Many more crossed onto the killing ground of Koukunniemi where they were hit by Finnish artillery fire, losing several hundred casualties. The stunned survivors fled to the south bank in the face of a threatened counterattack.

Over the next several days artillery duels were fought as Grendal's forces probed the Finnish lines for weak points and brought up more guns. A new effort began on December 14 after the two divisions had completely deployed. Soviet artillery strength had increased to 57 batteries, opposed to nine batteries of Finnish field artillery. After an unprecedented bombardment, and using pre-dawn darkness for cover, 30 Soviet tanks began crossing the ice toward the south end of the peninsula, while another 20 rolled toward the northern end at Patoniemi. These were followed by infantry in divisional strength. Fire from the tanks began to cause Finnish casualties. Finally, the Finnish artillery, which had remained silent to this point, opened fire in a planned, methodical fashion. Five minutes of such fire brought the attack to a halt, and 18 tanks were burning. The 142nd now entered the fight, adding even more artillery, but the riflemen performed poorly, milling about under shelling. However the attack persisted, and now Finnish machine gun and rifle fire, along with mortars and grenades, began to take a toll. Minefields and barbed wire under the snow also effectively blocked the advance. In one attack that lasted under an hour 1,000 men were killed and 27 tanks knocked out, largely by the 6-inch coastal guns.

Around December 22 the 4th Rifle Division joined the Group, which now contained 111 batteries of artillery. On December 25, under cover of heavy fog, several groups crossed the Suvanto and took bridgeheads at Patoniemi and Pähkemikkö. After the fog lifted the 10th Infantry counterattacked fiercely, killing some 500 at Patoniemi alone. The crossing at Pähkemikkö was foiled when the visibility revealed the lodgement was in clear view of several machine gun emplacements as little as 100m away. Farther northwest a rifle battalion crossed at Kelja, dug in, and signaled for reinforcements. If these had been available before the fog lifted the entire peninsula could have been cut off, but the reinforcements came under artillery fire while on the ice. 10th Division pressed every available man into battle and Kelja was finally retaken the next morning at considerable cost to both sides.

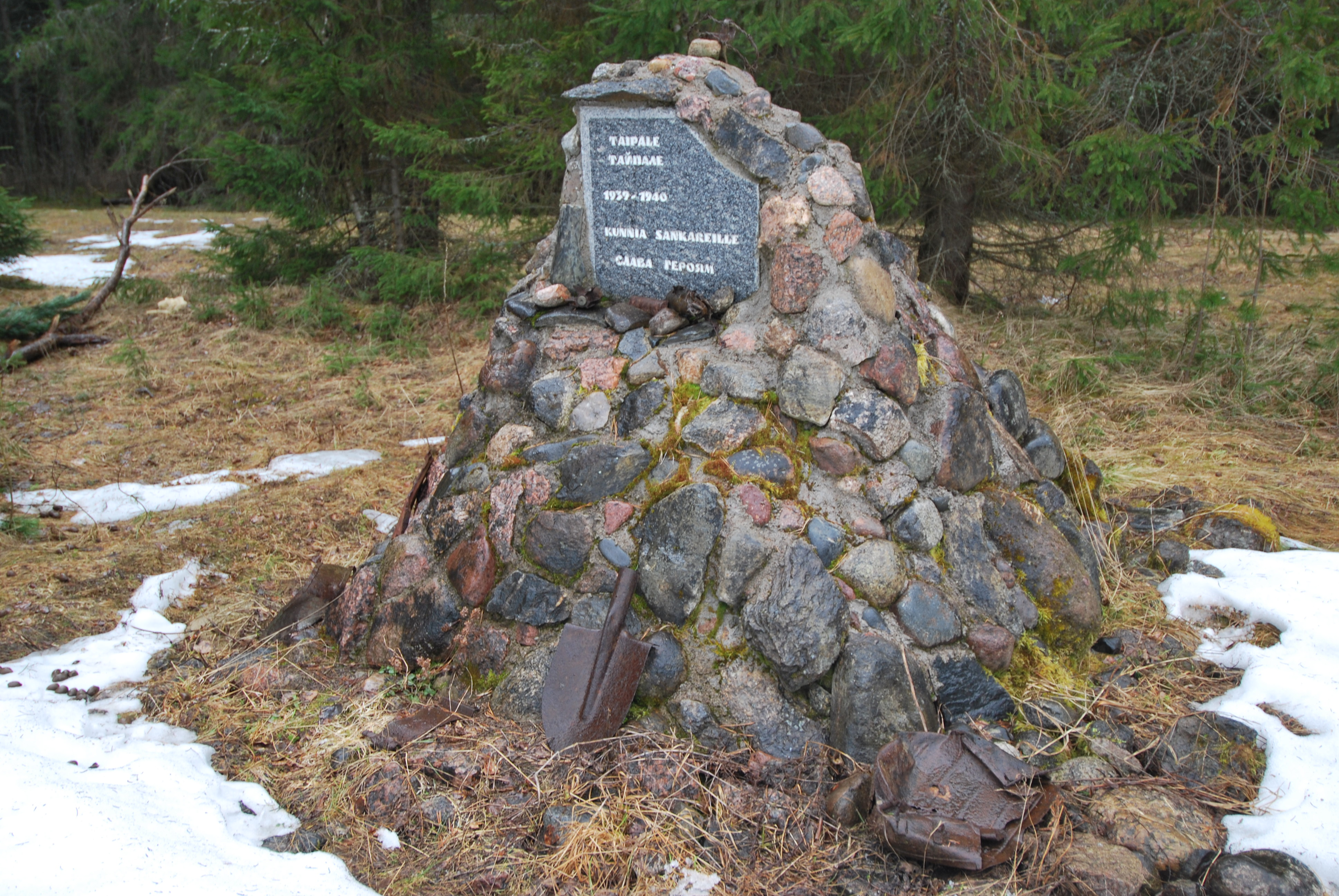
Monument to both sides at Taipale

This marked the end of major Soviet attacks at Taipale until February 1940, but the sector was never actually "quiet". Probes in up to regimental strength continued through January. At the same time the Soviet effort was reorganized, with Leningrad Military District renamed Northwestern Front. Grendal's Group was renamed 13th Army. 7th Army began its renewed offensive at Summa on February 1. During February 10-11 the fighting resumed at Taipale. In a new approach long columns were sent across the ice of Lake Ladoga, but these were at the mercy of the coastal guns. On February 14, in just four hours some 2,500 Red Army men were killed or wounded on the ice. This was followed on February 18 by what was known by the Finns as the "Black Day at Taipale", when the entire 142nd, supported by a huge artillery and air bombardment, struck an untried replacement regiment and drove it off in panic. While the Finnish line was dented, the support line, manned by veterans, held. Despite this minor success, when the war ended on March 13 the 10th Infantry was still holding Taipale, although it was given up under the peace terms. On April 11 the 142nd was awarded the Order of the Red Banner; the 334th Artillery Regiment had been awarded the same four days earlier. Kombrig Pshennikov left the division on April 27 and was replaced by his chief of staff, Mikulskii, who would be promoted to the rank of major general on September 11, 1941. Pshennikov took command of the 36th Rifle Corps and was leading 23rd Army at the start of the Continuation War. He was in command of 3rd Army with the rank of lieutenant general on December 28, 1941, when he was killed in action.

== Continuation War ==
On June 22, 1941, the division was in 19th Rifle Corps of 23rd Army near the Finnish border in Leningrad Military District. The Corps also contained the 115th Rifle Division. Leningrad District was redesignated Northern Front the same day. The 142nd's order of battle was unusual as it contained four rifle regiments instead of the standard three:

- 461st Rifle Regiment
- 588th Rifle Regiment
- 701st Rifle Regiment
- 946th Rifle Regiment
- 334th Artillery Regiment
- 260th Howitzer Artillery Regiment (until December 26, 1941)
- 234th Antitank Battalion
- 150th Antiaircraft Battery (later 302nd Antiaircraft Battalion, until January 18, 1943)
- 192nd Mortar Battalion (from October 31, 1941 to October 20, 1942)
- 172nd Reconnaissance Company
- 227th Sapper Battalion
- 562nd Signal Battalion (later 196th Signal Battalion, 906th, 869th Signal Companies)
- 156th Medical/Sanitation Battalion
- 145th Chemical Defense (Anti-gas) Company
- 145th Motor Transport Company (later 203rd Battalion, 213th Company)
- 283rd Field Bakery (later 150th Motorized Field Bakery)
- 245th Divisional Veterinary Hospital (later 284th)
- 430th Field Postal Station
- 197th Field Office of the State Bank

On May 25 the commander of Leningrad District, Lt. Gen. M. M. Popov, and his staff had drawn up a defense plan which created five "covering regions", each manned by a single army and defending a probable axis of attack. Pshennikov's 23rd was the most powerful, responsible for Region #3, the main route on the Karelian Isthmus from Vyborg (Viipuri) to the northern approaches to Leningrad. In addition to 19th Corps he also had the 50th Rifle Corps, two fortified regions, and the 10th Mechanized Corps.

On June 29 the Finnish Army began its offensive against 23rd Army and the commander of the 461st Rifle Regiment, Col. Vasilii Alekseevich Trubachev, sufficiently distinguished himself for his leadership to be made a Hero of the Soviet Union. The regiment was holding positions in the Ristilahti sector of the Lakhdenpohja direction east of Vyborg, covering the railroad from Sortavala to Leningrad. On the third day of the offensive the regiment continued to hold its positions when an attack by a Finnish battalion developed on the sector of his 3rd Battalion. As Finnish troops rallied for a fresh assault Trubachev arrived in the first trench and took post next to a heavy machine gun, ordering the gunner, Krasnoarmeets Aleksandr Ivanovich Zakhodskii, to hold his fire up to point-blank range, which caused heavy casualties. Following this he led a successful counterattack which drove the Finns back to their start line. Under his leadership the regiment held its positions for five weeks, finally falling back on August 4. He had already been awarded the Gold Star on July 25, one of the first of the war. Zakhodskii was posthumously made a Hero of the Soviet Union in the same decree, having been killed by a mortar fragment on July 10, at the age of 24. Trubachev went on to lead four rifle divisions and then the 117th Rifle Corps during the war, and died in an accident in Moscow in June 1964.

Through August the Finns pushed south down the isthmus as the Red Army conducted a fighting retreat. On August 31 the front had reached general line of the 1939 Finnish-Soviet border, where the Finns halted. The 142nd would remain along this line, fighting a static war, until June 1944. General Mikulskii left the division on September 28 to again serve as Pshennikov's chief of staff; he would go on to command several rifle corps. Col. Vladimir Kuzmich Paramzin took over on October 5, remaining in command until November 22, 1942, when he handed over to Col. Andrei Fyodorovich Mashoshin. This officer was in turn succeeded on February 14, 1943, by Col. Ivan Danilovich Romantsov, who was promoted to major general on April 28. On December 9 Col. Grigorii Leontevich Sonnikov took command for the duration of the war. This officer had most recently served as commander of the 201st Rifle Division, deputy commander of the 10th Rifle Division, and communications officer for the commander of Leningrad Front, Army Gen. L. A. Govorov.

== Vyborg–Petrozavodsk Offensive ==
The German Army Group North to the south of Leningrad were driven away in the Leningrad–Novgorod offensive in January 1944. In early June, the Soviet 23rd and 21st Armies were reinforced for a reckoning with Finland. The 142nd was now in 23rd Army's 115th Rifle Corps, under command of Maj. Gen. S. B. Kozachek, along with the 10th Rifle Division. The Corps was on the extreme right flank and in first echelon of 23rd Army on the shores of Lake Ladoga, in much the same position where the 142nd had begun the Winter War. By now it had lost the 701st Rifle Regiment. The divisions of 23rd Army had personnel strengths from 6,400 to 7,000 each.

The Finnish Army occupied the old Mannerheim Line, which had been improved over the previous three years, as well as an elaborate series of fortifications along the pre-1939 frontier. In the initial plan, 115th Corps was to defend from the Okhta to Lake Ladoga; once 21st Army reached the Sestra River, 23rd Army was to take command of 97th Rifle Corps and take the offensive with it and 98th Rifle Corps to roll up the Finnish defense to the east. At this point 115th Corps would enter the fight and 23rd Army would penetrate the Finnish second line. Altogether, the two Armies deployed 15 rifle divisions, two fortified regions, 10 tank and self-propelled artillery regiments, supported by 220 artillery and mortar battalions, but this did not take account of Leningrad Front's reserves of nearly equal size.

21st Army's share of the offensive began on June 10, and 98th Corps joined in the next morning. By that evening the two Armies had penetrated the forward line up to 26km, crossed the Sestra, and forced the Finns to withdraw to their second line. Despite these successes, the STAVKA was urging haste. On June 12 the 98th and part of 97th Corps continued to attack, but rearguard actions limited the advance to a maximum of 6km. The Front commander, Govorov, now decided on a halt to regroup for a deliberate assault on the second line. This began on 23rd Army's sector with a 55-minute artillery preparation on June 14. Kozachek sent his 10th and newly arrived 92nd Rifle Division against the Finnish 15th Infantry Division and captured Siiranmiaki, 500-600m inside the second line, by the end of the day. The 142nd entered the battle on June 15 and advanced 9km against the Finnish 19th Infantry Brigade, completing the penetration of the first Finnish defensive belt.

During June 16-17, most of 23rd Army was reduced to a snail's pace due to heavy terrain, Finnish rear-guards, and the defenses on the second line. However, 115th Corps managed an advance of up to 12km on the Keksholm axis, arriving at the second line. In fresh orders, Govorov urged 23rd Army to:

pursue the Finns energetically along its entire front, prevent him from withdrawing to the Vuoksi water system, and seize positions along the southern shores of Lakes Suvanto-iarvi, Vuoksi-iarvi, and Iaiuriapian-iarvi to Muolaa no later than 18 June.

115th Corps was then to remain along part of this line while 98th Corps regrouped to attack toward Repola. At the same time, Mannerheim authorized the withdrawal of his hard-pressed forces to the Vuoksi–Vyborg line. On June 17 the 115th Corps made a fighting advance to a line from the Taipalenioki River to Suvenmiaki, of some 3km south of Rautu station. Two days later the Corps, with 17th Fortified Region, forced the 15th Infantry to pull back to positions north of the Vuoksi, on a sector 50km wide.

Overnight on June 19/20 Govorov ordered his Armies to "destroy the enemy Vyborg grouping and capture Vyborg no later than 20 June by developing the attack to the northwest." 115th Corps was to defend the right flank of 23rd Army's shock group along the Vuoksi. However, when this attack began it was soon discovered that the city had been abandoned, and it was occupied the next day. Govorov was promoted to the rank of Marshal, but the strategic aims of the STAVKA had not been met. 115th Corps remained along its previous lines.

=== Battle of Vuosalmi ===
As the offensive was renewed on June 22 the strength of the Finnish forces on the isthmus was actually greater than it had been on June 10. Cherepanov's first attacks on June 22–23 by 98th and 6th Rifle Corps made no progress at all, even failing to eliminate a Finnish bridgehead at Iaiuriapia until July 7. 115th Corps was ordered to make an assault crossing on July 9, in the Vuosalmi area. General Kozachek's plan called for an artillery bombardment of 90 minutes to 120 minutes, followed by air attacks. Colonel Sonnikov objected to the start time as it would leave insufficient time to make the crossing before the artillery ceased, and requested permission to begin twenty minutes earlier. This was rejected, but in the event he went ahead on his own responsibility, trusting to air recognition means to avoid friendly fire from aircraft.

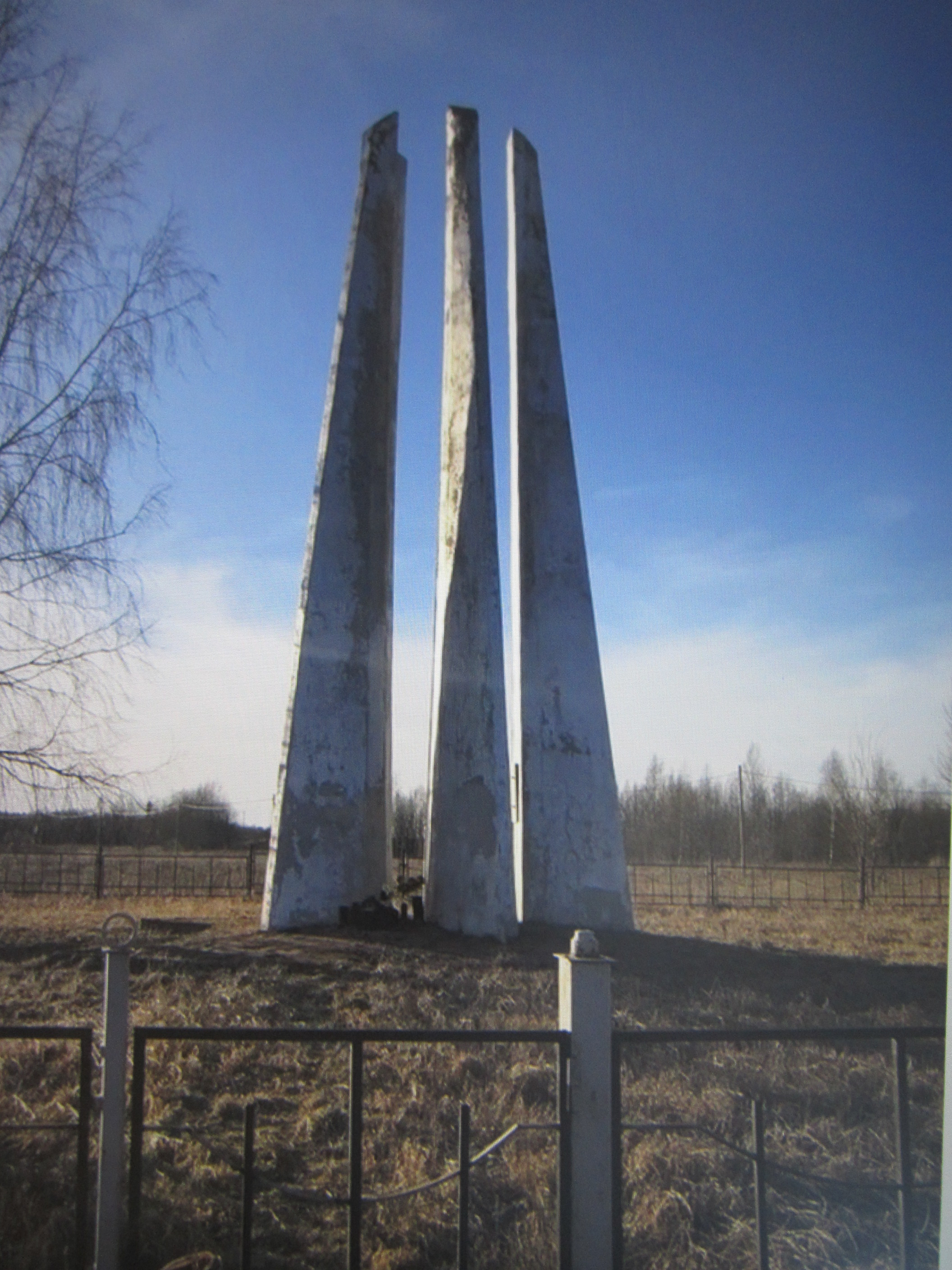
The "5 Bayonets Memorial" to 115th Corps' crossing of the Vuoksa

In the course of the landing operation three men of the assault detachment of 588th Rifle Regiment fought with distinction and would become Heroes of the Soviet Union. Sen. Lt. Nikolai Petrovich Osiev led his 6th Company in making one of the first crossings while under fire which damaged several boats. Jr. Lt. Semyon Pavlovich Kobets was one of his platoon commanders, who had already conducted reconnaissance which had provided important information to the regimental commander and then dug in to defend the regimental headquarters from as many as 22 counterattacks over the next 10 hours. Krasnoarmeets Pyotr Alekseevich Potryasov of the 3rd Company had his boat sunk under him near the north bank but managed to save a heavy machine gun which he brought ashore. Handing this off to a platoon commander and then joined the attack on the Finnish trenches along the shore, which turned into hand-to-hand combat. He helped lead six attacks, despite being wounded by a nearby shell explosion. Meanwhile, Osiev, who had taken a head wound, became aware of a group of about 50 Finnish soldiers nearby and volunteered to lead an attack which killed or drove them off, with the assistance of Kobets. Potryasov continued his battle when several Finnish tanks appeared among their infantry. On his own initiative he crawled to a position to take them in flank with machine gun fire, causing about 10 casualties and causing confusion. Osiev took advantage of this by sending three men with light machine guns to his assistance, separating the infantry from the tanks while they came under antitank fire. In the course of the fighting Potryasov suffered three wounds, the last of which made him unfit to serve at the front. Over the next two days Osiev and his group fought off four more counterattacks, securing the flank of the bridgehead as the remainder of the division crossed. All three men survived the war, and on March 24, 1945, they and five others from all three rifle regiments would be made Heroes of the Soviet Union.

The Finnish III Army Corps responded with reinforcements, trying to crush the bridgehead. In the end they were only able to contain it. By July 15 Finnish intelligence began to detect that Leningrad Front was beginning to remove its better troops and replace them with garrison troops. In fact, the bloodied divisions of 23rd Army wad already gone over to the defense on July 11. The Moscow Armistice of September 19 would finally bring the fighting to a halt, leaving the 142nd available for the assault on Germany. During that month the division was reassigned to 98th Corps in the Reserve of the Supreme High Command; the Corps would soon become part of 2nd Shock Army, and was moving by rail to Ostrów Mazowiecka in Poland, arriving there on October 30. The division would remain in this Corps for most of the duration of the war.

== Advance into Germany ==
2nd Shock was assigned to 2nd Belorussian Front, under command of Marshal K. K. Rokossovskii. 98th Corps now consisted of the 142nd, 281st, and 381st Rifle Divisions. In preparation for the Vistula-Oder offensive the Army was deployed on a line from the heights east of Dzierżanowo to Borsuki. When the Front's attack began on January 14, 1945, 2nd Shock Army was tasked to break out of the Różan bridgehead across the Narew River, with the immediate goal of taking the town of Ciechanów and then, in conjunction with 65th Army, to eliminate the enemy in the Pułtusk area. 98th Corps was in the Army's first echelon, and, once a breach in the German defenses had been created, would support the commitment of the 8th Guards Tank Corps. On the second day, 2nd Shock encountered powerful resistance in the form of more than 100 tanks of 7th Panzer Division backing counterattacks by 5th Jäger and 7th Infantry Divisions in a desperate effort to prevent the encirclement of the Pułtusk grouping. As a result, by the end of the day the 98th Corps gained only 1-2.5km. The situation changed overnight as the German forces began to withdraw from Pułtusk and on January 16, led by 8th Guards Tank, 2nd Shock advanced 20km. The next day the 98th Corps helped to liberate Ciechanów and was following 8th Guards Tank in the direction of Mława, cutting the highway from this fortified center to Bieżuń by the end of January 18 after a further advance of 30km. On February 19 the 461st Rifle Regiment would be awarded the Order of the Red Banner for its part in defeating the German defenses north of Warsaw.

=== East Pomeranian Offensive ===
The second stage of the East Pomeranian Offensive began on February 24. By this time the 142nd had been detached to the 108th Rifle Corps; together with the 37th Guards Rifle Division and part of the 91st Fortified Region it was maintaining the siege of the elements of XXIII Army Corps in the town of Graudenz, which had been encircled in the first phase. By the time the town was taken on March 6 the division had returned to 98th Corps, and it received a battle honor:

GRUDZIADZ – ...142nd Rifle Division (Col. Sonnikov, Grigorii Leontevich)... The troops that participated in the battle for the liberation of Grudziadz, by order of the Supreme Commander-in-Chief of 6 March 1945 and a commendation in Moscow, are given a salute of 20 artillery salvoes by 224 guns.

In the third stage, from this date until March 13, the Front was directed to destroy the German 2nd Army, which was cut off in northeastern Pomerania. Beginning on March 11 2nd Shock was to attack towards Gdańsk from the south, and advanced along both banks of the Vistula over the next two days before reaching the lines of its fortified area on March 13. After ten days on the defensive, 2nd Shock joined the assault on March 23, and by the end of the 26th had helped force the German Gdańsk group back into the city proper. Over the following days it cleared the enemy from the area between the Vistula and the Gdańsk - Praust railway as the city fell on March 30. In recognition of its part, the 461st Rifle Regiment (Lt. Colonel Voydo, Grigorii Grigorievch) was given its name as an honorific.

Following this victory 2nd Shock began moving west for the Berlin campaign, but 98th Corps was detached to remain near Gdańsk for the duration of the war, and by the beginning of May was under direct command of 2nd Belorussian Front.

== Postwar ==
The division finished the war along the Baltic coast in west Pomerania, with the official designation of 142nd Rifle, Graudenz, Order of the Red Banner Division. (Russian: 142-я стрелковая Граудзендзкая Краснознамённая дивизия.) On May 17, in a final round of honors, the 588th Rifle and 334th Artillery Regiments each received the Order of Suvorov, 3rd Degree, for their roles in the battle for Gdańsk. It was disbanded in the Northern Group of Forces in Poland in July 1945, in accordance with STAVKA Order No. 11097 dated May 29, 1945. Sonnikov was given command of the 27th Rifle Division in the Group of Soviet Forces in Germany until he was discharged into the reserve on March 8, 1947. In retirement he wrote his memoirs and made repeated trips to Priozersk to commemorate the Vuoksi battle; he was made the town's first honorary citizen on September 20, 1969. He died in Leningrad in 1978 and was buried in the city's Northern Cemetery.
