= 92nd Rifle Division =

92nd Rifle Division (November 28, 1936 – July 30, 1942) 92nd Rifle Division (August 16, 1942 – July 1945)
- Active: 1936–1945
- Country: Soviet Union
- Branch: Red Army (1939-46)
- Type: Infantry
- Size: Division
- Engagements: Siege of Leningrad; Tikhvin Offensive; Battle of Lyuban; Continuation War; Vyborg–Petrozavodsk offensive Battle of Vuosalmi; Vistula–Oder offensive Sandomierz–Silesian offensive Lower Silesian offensive Upper Silesian offensive Prague offensive
- Battle honours: Kraków (2nd Formation)

Commanders
- Notable commanders: Kombrig Lyudvit Matveevich Gavro; Kombrig Filipp Fedosevich Zhmachenko; Col. Andrei Nikolaevich Larychev; Col. Aleksandr Pavlovich Ivanov; Maj. Gen. Yakov Afanasevich Panichkin; Col. Matvei Vasilevich Vinogradov

The 92nd Rifle Division was originally formed as an infantry division of the Red Army on November 28, 1936, in the Special Red Banner Far Eastern Army, based on a fortified region and several other units. It remained in the far east of Siberia until after the outbreak of war with Germany, in Far Eastern Front's 25th Army, but began moving to the west in mid-October to reinforce the 4th Army outside the recently blockaded city of Leningrad. It was under this command in when it took part in the late November - December counteroffensive that drove forces of German 18th Army out of the town of Tikhvin and the bridgehead it had created east of the Volkhov River. It was reassigned to Volkhov Front's 59th Army in January 1942. Under this command it entered the penetration across the Volkhov created by 2nd Shock Army, being subordinated to this command in March, and spent several months deep behind German lines in the swamps south of Lyuban in a vain effort to relieve Leningrad. During June scattered remnants of the 92nd emerged from the pocket, but most of its men, including its commander, were lost, and the division was officially disbanded on July 30.

A new 92nd was created several weeks later with the redesignation of the 20th NKVD Rifle Division in 23rd Army of Leningrad Front, north of the city. It would remain on the Beloostrov–Lembolovo sector facing the Finnish Army until June 10, 1944, when it took part in the offensive that would drive Finland out of the war. During the campaign it advanced to the Vuoksi waterway near Vuosalmi but was held there in early July until the STAVKA ordered the offensive to a halt. After several months monitoring the new Finnish border the 92nd was transferred to 59th Army, which soon entered the Reserve of the Supreme High Command and was moved to southern Poland to join 1st Ukrainian Front for the winter offensive in January 1945. It soon shared credit for the capture of Kraków and was given its name as a battle honor. During February and March it attacked into Silesia, crossing the Oder River and eventually taking part in the encirclement and destruction of a German grouping near Oppeln. It ended the war advancing into Czechoslovakia and was disbanded in July.

== 1st Formation ==
The original 92nd completed forming on November 28, 1936, in the Far Eastern Army, largely based on the Barabash Fortified Region (a static unit for border defense). Other personnel came from the 40th Rifle Division and smaller units in Primorsky Krai. The rifle regiments were initially numbered as the 274th, 275th, and 276th. The division was under command of Kombrig Lyudvit Matveevich Gavro, who had previously led the 50th Rifle Division and the Barabash Fortified Region. On July 1, 1937, he was arrested as part of the Great Purge, and would be condemned to death and executed on May 23, 1938, although he would be rehabilitated in 1956. He was replaced by Col. Filipp Fedosevich Zhmachenko, who was promoted to Kombrig on February 17, 1938. In June he too was arrested and was held until July 1939, when he became chief of the Combat Training Section of the Kharkov Military District. He later led several armies and would be promoted to the rank of colonel general just after the end of the war with Germany, while also being named a Hero of the Soviet Union. On January 31, 1940, Col. Andrei Nikolaevich Larychev took over the division and he would lead it through most of the rest of the first formation.

In September 1939, for security and intelligence reasons, all the rifle divisions had their regiments' numbers "scrambled", and the 92nd emerged with the following order of battle:

- 22nd Rifle Regiment
- 203rd Rifle Regiment
- 317th Rifle Regiment
- 60th Artillery Regiment
- 70th Howitzer Artillery Regiment (until January 7, 1942)
- 77th Antitank Battalion
- 163rd Antiaircraft Battery (later 15th Antiaircraft Battalion)
- 409th Mortar Battalion
- 50th Reconnaissance Battalion
- 96th Sapper Battalion
- 13th Signal Battalion
- 7th Medical/Sanitation Battalion
- 106th Chemical Defense (Anti-gas) Platoon
- 149th Motor Transport Company (later 497th Motor Transport Battalion)
- 53rd Field Bakery
- 70th Divisional Veterinary Hospital
- 998th Field Postal Station

On June 22, 1941, the division was in Far Eastern Front, part of the 39th Rifle Corps of 25th Army. It was assigned the 388th Tank Battalion (54 T-26s; its reconnaissance battalion already contained six of these) on October 10 and on October 14 it began moving west on the Trans-Siberian Railway. It had over 13,000 personnel on strength, plus the 60 tanks, 40 45mm antitank guns, 140 artillery pieces (76mm or 152mm) and mortars, eight 76mm antiaircraft guns plus 20 antiaircraft machine guns. The rifle companies had an average strength of 100 each.

== Tikhvin Offensive ==
Tikhvin Offensive. Front line as of November 8, 1941 and planned German advances.

The German XXXIX Panzer Corps, with infantry support, had crossed the Volkhov River on October 16 in an effort to capture Budogoshch and Tikhvin through nearly roadless terrain already covered in 9-10cm of snow. Taking the latter would deepen the encirclement of Leningrad, making supply across Lake Ladoga impossible and possibly also linking up with the Finnish Army. Despite the limited mobility Budogoshch was taken on October 23. The STAVKA ordered its 4th Army (which was not under any Front command) to be reinforced, including with the 92nd and the 60th Tank Division from its reserves. The 92nd began arriving at Tikhvin in the last days of the month, offloading at Taltsi, Khottsi, and Nebolchi on October 30.

The STAVKA had begun planning a number of counterstrokes to defeat the German forces on the Tikhvin axes. On October 29 it sent orders to Lt. Gen. V. F. Yakovlev, commander of 4th Army, to create two shock groups, each of about two divisions in strength and each containing part of 60th Tanks. These were to strike toward Budogoshch and Gruzino on November 1 along with the 92nd, which was already operating against the 20th Motorized Division to the south. The objective was to destroy the attackers and restore the line along the Volkhov. The southern grouping, in the event, attacked during November 4-6 but failed to advance due to heavy air and artillery strikes and numerous counterattacks. On the latter date a sudden extreme cold snap began freezing the many waterways in the region, and XXXIX Panzer resumed its push toward Tikhvin, which was taken from the 191st Rifle Division by the 12th Panzer Division in a snowstorm on November 8. This cut the last rail line from Lake Ladoga to Moscow, and also forced the evacuation of Yakovlev's headquarters.

Despite this success it was clear to both sides that XXXIX Panzer was at the end of its tether. The cold and the terrain had disabled or damaged many vehicles; temperatures as low as -40°C were causing many cases of frostbite or death by hypothermia. Soviet resistance was stiffening both north of Tikhvin and around Malaya Vishera to the south. The Finns showed no inclination to advance beyond their 1939 borders and, by now hemmed in on three sides, there was no prospect of continuing the advance. Between those two towns 18th Army was attempting to hold a 100km-long front with 20th Motorized, 8th Panzer Division, and 126th Infantry Division, which amounted to nothing more than a scattering of strongpoints. Hitler refused to give up his gains and now directed Army Group North to advance on Volkhov and Novaya Ladoga with part of 8th Panzer and the 254th Infantry Division while the 61st Infantry Division relieved XXXIX Panzer at Tikhvin. On November 9 the STAVKA replaced Yakovlev with Army Gen. K. A. Meretskov.

=== Soviet Counteroffensive ===
18th Army's bridgehead across the Volkhov now had a front line some 350km in length, tenuously held by some 120,000 exhausted and half-frozen men, with about 100 tanks and self-propelled guns and 1,000 artillery pieces. The STAVKA knew its only chance to hold Leningrad was to retake the rail lines to the shores of Lake Ladoga. It was able to concentrate 17 rifle divisions, two tank divisions, a cavalry division, and several smaller units totaling 192,950 men and divided into three armies (4th, 52nd, 54th). Meretskov was to make the main attack, encircling XXXIX Panzer at Tikhvin before linking up with the other armies along the Volkhov. He split his forces (five rifle, one tank and one cavalry division, one rifle and one tank brigade, plus three tank battalions) in to Northern, Eastern, and Southern Shock Groups; the Southern Group consisted of the 92nd, the 4th Guards Rifle Division, and a regiment of the 292nd Rifle Division. It was assigned to strike the extended outpost line held mostly by 20th Motorized east of Liuban and cut the lines of communications southwest of Tikhvin.

It proved impossible to coordinate the start of such a wide-ranging offensive, and 4th Army's part began on November 19. Soviet pressure on the strongpoint defense line, which had been reinforced with the 250th Infantry Division, required a constant drain on armor from 12th Panzer and 18th Motorized Division bottled up in Tikhvin on Hitler's orders. By December 7, the 92nd was engaged with 20th Motorized around Chudtsy, and at about the same time the 22nd Rifle Regiment was attached to the 4th Guards. The Southern Group was approaching Sitomlya, threatening communications from Tikhvin to the rear. At this time the Soviet counteroffensive west of Moscow was underway, which rendered Hitler's notions of continuing an advance from Tikhvin utterly futile. At 0200 hours on December 8 he finally authorized a withdrawal, which, in fact, had been underway for several hours. As this went on, the Northern and Eastern Groups struck the German rearguards and liberated Tikhvin late on December 9. On December 20 the 92nd received 700 replacements and took part in the liberation of Budogoshch the next day, after which the 22nd Regiment was returned to Larychev's command. The retaking of Tikhvin, in the event, would prove to be one of the first permanent liberations of Soviet territory during the war, and probably saved Leningrad.

During the latter stages of the campaign the division had the 88th Ski Battalion under command. After December 30, when it made a costly crossing of the Volkhov near Kirishi it was severely depleted in riflemen: 22nd Regiment had 71; the 203rd had 80; and the 317th had 180. Even after a month of static combat along the Volkhov the division was only back to 1,062 in the rifle regiments. In February 1942 what remained of the 388th Tanks was removed to 59th Army command. During January the 92nd had been reassigned to this Army in the new Volkhov Front.

== Lyuban Offensive ==
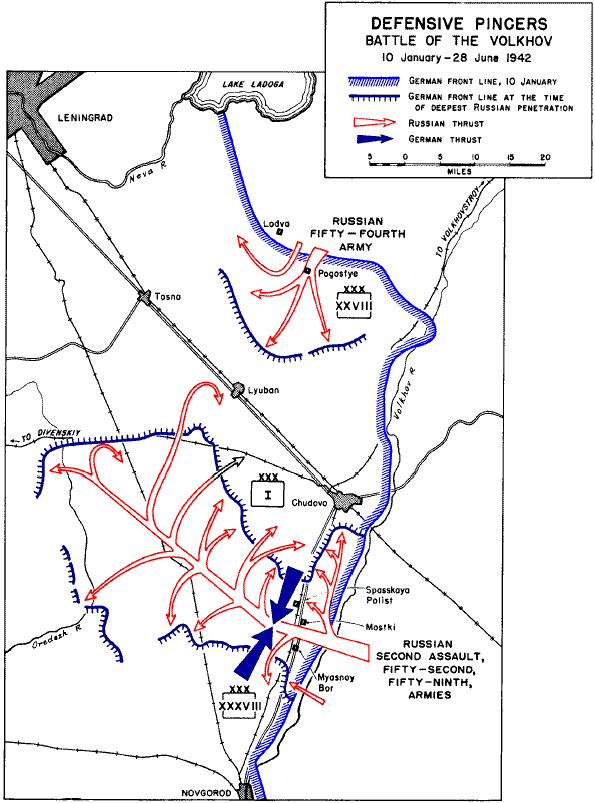
Lyuban Offensive

Volkhov Front had been formed on December 17 and consisted of the 4th, 52nd, 59th and 26th (soon redesignated 2nd Shock) Armies. At 2000 hours a directive was issued which stated:

The Volkhov Front... will launch a general offensive to smash the enemy defending along the western bank of the Volkhov River and reach the Liuban' and Cholovo Station front with your armies, main forces by the end of [left blank]...
Subsequently, attacking to the northwest, encircle the enemy defending around Leningrad, destroy and capture him in cooperation with the Leningrad Front.

Expanding the Tikhvin counteroffensive into a Volkhov-Leningrad offensive of much greater scope first required the establishment of adequate bridgeheads. To Stalin's disgust, the armies of Volkhov Front (under command of Meretskov) did so too slowly. The crossing made by the 92nd proved impossible to expand in the face of German defenses. Despite Stalin's urgings, 4th Army, now under Maj. Gen. P. A. Ivanov, was not able to capture Tigoda Station. Utterly exhausted, Meretskov's forces had no choice but to go over to the defense.

Beginning on January 6, 2nd Shock had made several efforts to break through the German defenses, and finally scored a partial success on January 17. With the support of over 1,500 aircraft sorties the Army finally penetrated the first German position on the Volkhov and advanced 5-10km. After a four-day halt to regroup, the Army commander resumed the fight on January 21, focused on the German strongpoints at Spasskaya Polist, Mostki, Zemtitsy, and Miasnoi Bor. On the night of January 23/24, Meretskov had finally convinced himself that 2nd Shock had blasted enough of a hole that he could commit his exploitation force, largely consisting of the 13th Cavalry Corps. However, after the cavalry and accompanying infantry passed through the gap, the XXXIX Motorized and XXXVIII Army Corps hastily assembled forces to contain the exploitation.

As part of the regrouping plan the 92nd and 378th Rifle Divisions were to be introduced into the penetration on January 29. With the situation in a stalemate Meretskov issued further orders early on January 27 to "develop the attack more rapidly, move the 92nd Rifle Division through the front's penetration in the 2nd Shock Army sector in the direction of Lesopunkt, height marker 38.9, and Priiutino by 28 January 1942." He intended to capture the German strongpoints on each side of the penetration, thereby widening it before taking Lyuban itself. The renewed effort on January 27/28 again failed to take Spasskaya Polist and Zemtitsy due to weak cooperation, poor use of tanks and artillery, and costly frontal attacks. Nevertheless the bulk of 2nd Shock, plus elements of the 59th, were able to pass through the gap and advance up to 75km. There were now over 100,000 Red Army troops in the German rear in a position to advance on Lyuban. However, the frozen terrain of wooded swamps and peat bogs hindered the advance and the narrow gap imposed its own difficulties on communications.

=== Battle in Encirclement ===
During February's fighting 2nd Shock, under command of Lt. Gen. N. K. Klykov, was able to expand its pocket but unable to break out decisively toward Leningrad. On February 26, an increasingly frustrated Stalin directed Meretskov as follows:

... the STAVKA categorically demands that, under no circumstances are you to cease the 2nd Shock and 59th Armies' offensive operations along the Liuban' and Chudovo axes in the expectation of reinforcements. On the contrary, it demands that, after receiving reinforcements, you reach the Liuban'-Chudovo railroad by 1 March in order to liquidate the enemy Liuban' and Chudovo groupings completely no later than 5 March.

Stalin also sent Lt. Gen. A. A. Vlasov to serve as Meretskov's deputy. A further attack by five rifle divisions, one cavalry division, and four rifle brigades on March 4 made only minor gains against strong resistance. 54th Army, attacking from the north, managed an advance of 22km on March 15, but this soon stalled just 10km north of Lyuban. At about this time the 92nd was formally subordinated to 2nd Shock.

In early March, Army Group North began preparing a counterstroke to cut off the Soviet Lyuban force combined with an effort to relieve its own II Army Corps encircled at Demyansk. While the ground troops were ready by March 9, the counteroffensive was delayed until March 15 due to the Luftwaffe's commitments elsewhere. When it began at 0730 hours two shock groups totaling five divisions with strong air support attacked from Spasskaya Polist and Zemtitsy toward Lyubino Pole at the base of 2nd Shock's penetration. On the first day the northern shock group gained 3km and the southern group gained 1,000m. After two days of crawling through boggy terrain against heavy resistance the northern group cut one supply route on March 18 and the southern group severed the second the next day. The two groups linked up on March 20, trapping 2nd Shock in the half-frozen wastes south of Lyuban.

Even as the counterstroke was underway, Meretskov frantically formulated plans to thwart it. Despite these exertions, by March 26 German forces had formed outer and inner encirclement lines along the Glushitsa and Polist Rivers. He ordered Klykov to form an operational group to spearhead a breakout to the lines of 52nd Army. This assault by the two Armies, which employed all of his reserves, began early on March 27, and by the end of the day the desperate and costly attacks managed to carve out a narrow gap 3-5km wide through the German cordon near Miasnoi Bor. With this small victory Meretskov ordered 2nd Shock to begin a new effort to reach Lyuban on April 2. A further attack on April 8 widened the gap to 6km, but in the meantime the drive on Lyuban had failed again.

By this time the spring rasputitsa had set in, what roads existed became impassable for vehicles, the supply routes through the gap were underwater, and 2nd Shock was running short of ammunition, fuel and food. Command, control and communications within the Army had become impossible. Under these circumstances there was no option but to dig in and await more favorable conditions to resume operations. On April 21 the Leningrad and Volkhov Fronts were regrouped, and Meretskov departed for the front west of Moscow. The previous day he had sent his deputy, General Vlasov, into the pocket to replace the ailing Klykov. His mission was to either reinvigorate the offensive or extricate the Army from its perilous position. At the same rime Colonel Larychev left the 92nd, being replaced by Col. Faddey Mikhailovich Zhiltsov, former commander of the 58th Rifle Brigade, but this proved temporary as Larychev returned on May 25 when Zhiltsov was moved to the 327th Rifle Division.

By May it was clear to the STAVKA that withdrawal was the only viable option. Vlasov was ordered to take up an all-round defense, with 13th Cavalry in reserve. The Front commander, Lt. Gen. M. S. Khozin, sent a proposal to the STAVKA to attack with two divisions and a tank brigade from the east and a further four divisions from inside the pocket, tentatively beginning on May 6. This would focus on the long, narrow salient held by German Group Wendel north of the gap. In the event, this tentative date was not met, and on May 12 Khozin notified the STAVKA that Group Wendel was being reinforced, which he took as firm evidence that another attempt to cut the corridor was in the offing. In response, at 2050 hours he ordered Vlasov, and the relevant parts of 59th Army, to begin planning their breakout. His plan, after modifications, was approved in the afternoon of May 16. Heavy, chaotic, but mostly futile combat raged for several days as the ragged remnants of 2nd Shock Army, in large and small groups, tried desperately to reach Volkhov Front's lines. The main body of 59th Army could offer little assistance, primarily because its formations were woefully under strength and lacked both tanks and reserves.

Despite its weakness, Vlasov's army continued its battle to escape. On May 24 it began to pull back to its first planned position from the middle reaches of the Tigoda River through Ravan to Vditsko. The 92nd and the 327th, along with the 22nd and 23rd Rifle Brigades, took up a line from Ruchi, along the Ravan River, and as far as Vditsko, Rogavka Station, and Lake Tigoda on May 28, acting as the rearguard while the remainder withdrew to jumping-off positions for an attack to link up with 59th Army on June 5. At this time the 92nd was reported as having a total of 3,750 rifles remaining, including 500 SVT-40s; 120 light machine guns; 50 heavy machine guns; 25 antitank rifles; 12 antiaircraft machine guns; two 37mm antiaircraft guns; 25 45mm antitank guns; 24 76mm cannons; eight 122mm howitzers; plus 10 120mm, 30 82mm, and 20 50mm mortars. Its personnel strength on June 1 totaled 724 officers, 863 NCOs, and 2,498 enlisted men.

The link-up attack was preempted on May 30 when the XXXVIII and I Army Corps attacked the base of 2nd Shock's salient. By the end of June 6 the corridor was completely closed, sealing off seven rifle divisions, including the 92nd, plus six rifle brigades, a total of some 20,000 men. The STAVKA responded by relieving Khozin of his command, replacing him with Vlasov, and issuing a spate of orders to reorganized the command structure, none of which proved effective. By June 19 food had completely run out in the pocket due to the failure of air supply. Despite this 2nd Shock continued to fight for survival. Attacks on June 19 and June 21/22 allowed some 9,322 men to escape, but now Vlasov's headquarters lost radio communications with Volkhov Front. In mid-July a group of 83 "utterly exhausted" men of the 92nd emerged. Colonel Larychev was not among them, having died in the fighting. On July 30 the division was officially disbanded.

== 2nd Formation ==
A new 92nd Rifle Division was created on August 16 when the 20th NKVD Rifle Division was redesignated and transferred to Red Army control from the NKVD. It was in the 23rd Army of Leningrad Front, north of the city. NKVD Col. Aleksandr Pavlovich Ivanov, who had led the 20th through its existence, remained in command of the 92nd. Its order of battle was very similar to that of the original 92nd:

- 22nd Rifle Regiment (from 7th NKVD Rifle Regiment)
- 203rd Rifle Regiment (from 8th NKVD Rifle Regiment)
- 317th Rifle Regiment (from 9th NKVD Rifle Regiment)
- 60th Artillery Regiment
- 77th Antitank Battalion
- 50th Reconnaissance Company
- 96th Sapper Battalion
- 13th Signal Battalion (later 102nd Signal Company)
- 7th Medical/Sanitation Battalion
- 106th Chemical Defense (Anti-gas) Platoon
- 149th Motor Transport Company
- 169th Field Bakery
- 70th Divisional Veterinary Hospital
- 998th Field Postal Station
- 1131st Field Office of the State Bank

As part of 23rd Army the 92nd continued to man the fortified lines north of Leningrad observing, and occasionally skirmishing with, the forces of the Finnish Army. Colonel Ivanov left the division on December 22 to take command of the 123rd Rifle Division. He would be promoted to the rank of major general on April 21, 1943, and would be severely wounded and hospitalized in July 1944 during the offensive against Finland; he would never hold another front line command. Col. Yakov Afanasevich Panichkin took over the 92nd, having been in command of the 123rd. He would be promoted to major general on September 25, 1943.

The 115th Rifle Corps began forming in the reserves of Leningrad Front in March 1944 and during April it was moved to 23rd Army, taking the 92nd and 314th Rifle Divisions under command.

== Vyborg–Petrozavodsk Offensive ==
Army Group North to the south of Leningrad was driven away in the Leningrad–Novgorod offensive in January 1944. In early June, the Soviet 23rd and 21st Armies were reinforced for a reckoning with Finland. 115th Corps, which was under command of Maj. Gen. S. B. Kozachek, had been reinforced with the 10th and 142nd Rifle Divisions. The Corps was on the extreme right flank and in first echelon of 23rd Army on the shores of Lake Ladoga. The divisions of 23rd Army had personnel strengths from 6,400 to 7,000 each.

The Finnish Army occupied the old Mannerheim Line, which had been improved over the previous three years, as well as an elaborate series of fortifications along the pre-1939 frontier. In the initial plan, 115th Corps was to defend from the Okhta to Lake Ladoga; once 21st Army reached the Sestra River, 23rd Army was to take command of 97th Rifle Corps and take the offensive with it and 98th Rifle Corps to roll up the Finnish defense to the east. At this point 115th Corps would enter the fight and 23rd Army would penetrate the Finnish second line. Altogether, the two Armies deployed 15 rifle divisions, two fortified regions, 10 tank and self-propelled artillery regiments, supported by 220 artillery and mortar battalions, but this did not take account of Leningrad Front's reserves of nearly equal size.

21st Army's share of the offensive began on June 10, and 98th Corps joined in the next morning. By that evening the two Armies had penetrated the forward line up to 26km, crossed the Sestra, and forced the Finns to withdraw to their second line. Despite these successes, the STAVKA was urging haste. On June 12 the 98th and part of 97th Corps continued to attack, but rearguard actions limited the advance to a maximum of 6km. The Front commander, Army Gen. L. A. Govorov, now decided on a halt to regroup for a deliberate assault on the second line. This began on 23rd Army's sector with a 55-minute artillery preparation on June 14. Kozachek sent his 10th and newly arrived 92nd against the Finnish 15th Infantry Division capturing Siiranmiaki and Vekhmainen, 500-600m inside the second line, by the end of the day. The 142nd entered the battle on June 15 and advanced 9km against the Finnish 19th Infantry Brigade, completing the penetration of the first Finnish defensive belt.

During June 16-17, most of 23rd Army was reduced to a snail's pace due to heavy terrain, Finnish rear-guards, and the defenses on the second line. However, 115th Corps managed an advance of up to 12km on the Keksholm axis, arriving at the second line. In fresh orders, Govorov urged 23rd Army to:

pursue the Finns energetically along its entire front, prevent him from withdrawing to the Vuoksi water system, and seize positions along the southern shores of Lakes Suvanto-iarvi, Vuoksi-iarvi, and Iaiuriapian-iarvi to Muolaa no later than 18 June.

115th Corps was then to remain along part of this line while 98th Corps regrouped to attack toward Repola. At the same time, the Finnish commander-in-chief, Field Marshal C. G. E. Mannerheim, authorized the withdrawal of his hard-pressed forces to the Vuoksi–Vyborg line. On June 17 the 115th Corps made a fighting advance to a line from the Taipalenioki River to Suvenmiaki, of some 3km south of Rautu station. Two days later the Corps, with 17th Fortified Region, forced the 15th Infantry to pull back to positions north of the Vuoksi, on a sector 50km wide.

Overnight on June 19/20 Govorov ordered his Armies to "destroy the enemy Vyborg grouping and capture Vyborg no later than 20 June by developing the attack to the northwest." 115th Corps was to defend the right flank of 23rd Army's shock group along the Vuoksi. However, when this attack began it was soon discovered that the city had been abandoned, and it was occupied the next day. Govorov was promoted to the rank of Marshal, but the strategic aims of the STAVKA had not been met. 115th Corps remained along its previous lines. At about this time the 92nd was transferred to 98th Corps.

=== Battle of Vuosalmi ===
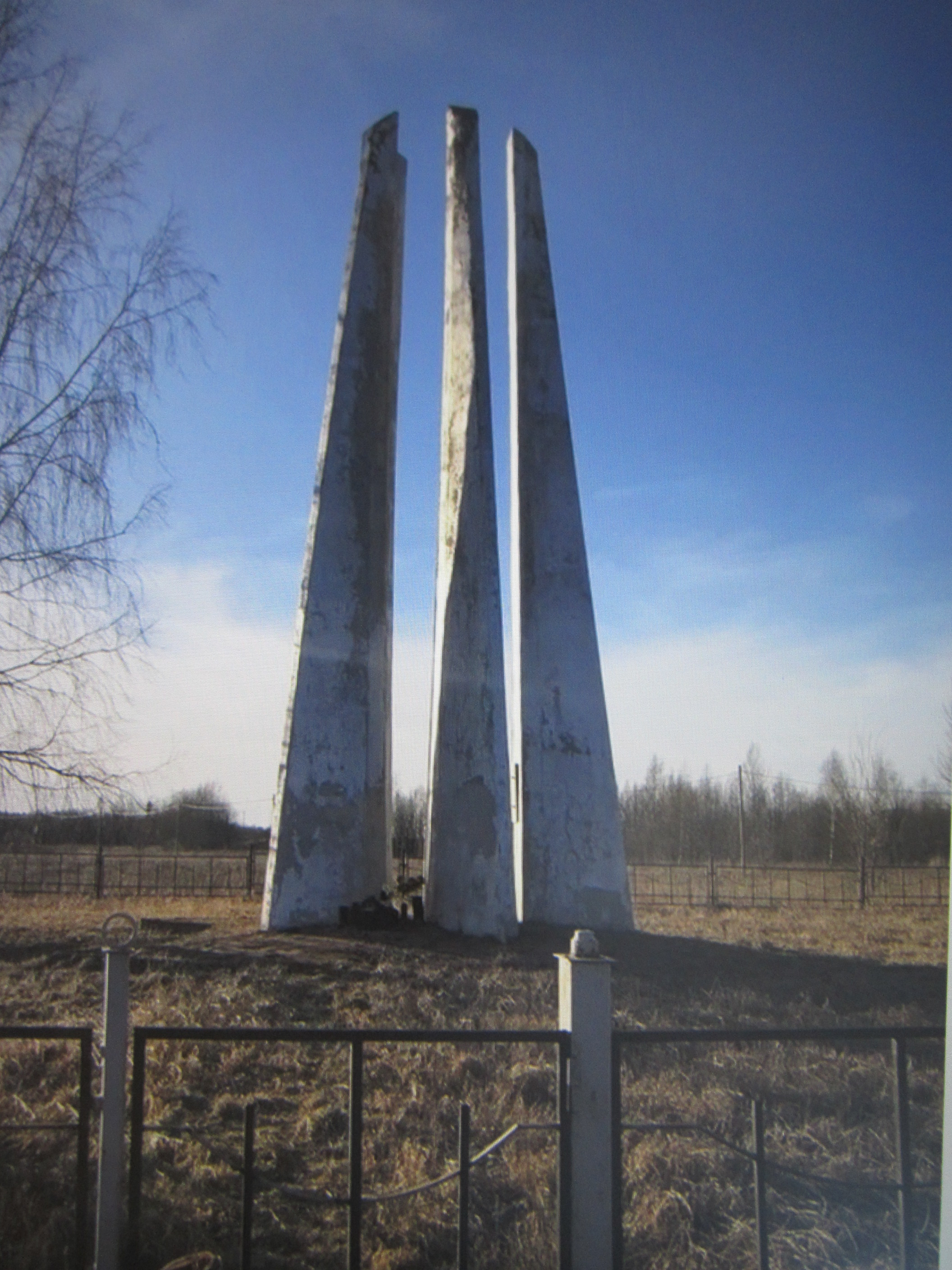
The "5 Bayonets Memorial" to the 10th, 92nd, and 142nd Divisions' crossing of the Vuoksa

As the offensive was renewed on June 22 the strength of the Finnish forces on the isthmus was actually greater than it had been on June 10. 23rd Army's first attacks on June 22–23 by 98th and 6th Rifle Corps toward Khitola made no progress at all, even failing to eliminate a Finnish bridgehead at Iaiuriapia until July 7. 115th Corps was ordered to make an assault crossing on July 9, in the Vuosalmi area. The Finnish III Army Corps responded with reinforcements, trying to crush the Corps' bridgehead. In the end they were only able to contain it. By July 15 Finnish intelligence began to detect that Leningrad Front was beginning to remove its better troops and replace them with garrison troops. In fact, the bloodied divisions of 23rd Army had already gone over to the defense on July 11.

During the period June 16-26 Sen. Sgt. Aleksei Nikolaevich Sharkov, an antitank gun commander of the 317th Rifle Regiment, distinguished himself sufficiently to be made a Hero of the Soviet Union. During a breakthrough deep inside the Finnish defenses near Korpikyulya he directed fire that destroyed several strongpoints and inflicted significant casualties. When the battery commander was killed he took command, despite being wounded himself, and continued the battle, repelling counterattacks for several hours. In recognition, on March 24, 1945, he was awarded the Gold Star. After the war he lived and worked in Yaroslavl Oblast, where he died on July 15, 1970.

By the beginning of August the 92nd had returned to 115th Corps, where it remained for the duration of the war. On November 26 the entire Corps began moving south to join the 59th Army, which became part of the Reserve of the Supreme High Command on December 1 as it continued to move south. It left the Reserve on December 20 and became part of 1st Ukrainian Front on January 1, 1945. General Panichkin had left the division on December 9 to attend studies at the Voroshilov Academy, and was replaced by Col. Matvei Vasilevich Vinogradov. This officer had been arrested after his 63rd Mountain Rifle Division was smashed in May 1942 in the Crimea. The case against him was dismissed for lack of evidence, but he remained under arrest until March 1943, after which he was hospitalized. In August he was made head of the Kharitonov Yaroslavl Infantry School where he served until taking command of the 92nd.

== Into Poland and Germany ==
1st Ukrainian Front was under command of Marshal I. S. Konev. It began its offensive from the Baranów bridgehead over the Vistula River at 0435 hours on January 12, and quickly achieved a breakthrough. The division was part of the Soviet force that liberated Kraków on January 18 and the next day received a battle honor:

KRAKOW... 92nd Rifle Division (Col. Vinogradov, Matvei Vasilevich)... By order of the Supreme High Command dated 19 January 1945, the troops who participated in the liberation of Krakow are thanked and a salute was given in Moscow by 24 artillery salvoes from 324 guns.

At this time 115th Corps consisted of the 92nd, 135th, and 245th Rifle Divisions, although by the beginning of February the 135th had been moved to Army command, being replaced by the 286th Rifle Division.

=== Lower Silesian Offensive ===
By January 28 the Dąbrowa Coal Basin and the city of Katowice had been cleared of German forces. The next objective was to secure crossings of the Oder River, which 59th Army reached on January 30 on a sector from Oderthal to Bachweiler. Left flank units of the Army captured a small bridgehead at the latter place. Among those who crossed was Jr. Sgt. Mikhail Fyodorovich Ivanov, who commanded an antitank gun of the 77th Antitank Battalion. Upon arriving at the river he directed fire that destroyed three machine gun pillboxes and on January 31 crossed to the bridgehead with his gun and crew, accounting for some 75 German casualties during counterattacks, although being wounded himself. The next day he was surrounded along with a group of 29 officers and men of the 203rd Rifle Regiment. After holding out for two days, during which all the officers became casualties, Ivanov led a breakout of the last seven men, personally carrying the regimental banner. On June 27 he would be made a Hero of the Soviet Union, as well as being awarded the Order of the Red Star for saving the banner. A native of Novgorod Governorate he returned there after demobilization in 1947 and lived in the village of Brodi until his death in 2002.

After initial setbacks in the operations to cross the Oder the offensive was renewed on February 5, but made little progress due to growing resistance, logistical isses, and rising water levels. The 92nd was withdrawn from the fighting and placed in defensive positions on the boundary with 60th Army along the line Bergwalde–Sziglowice, facing south and southwest. Vinogradov was directed to prepare antitank strongpoints along this axis and to maintain constant communications with 60th Army and maintain readiness to repel any German attack from these directions. Four days later, Konev ordered the commander of 59th Army, Lt. Gen. I. T. Korovnikov, to go over to the defensive.

=== Upper Silesian Offensive ===
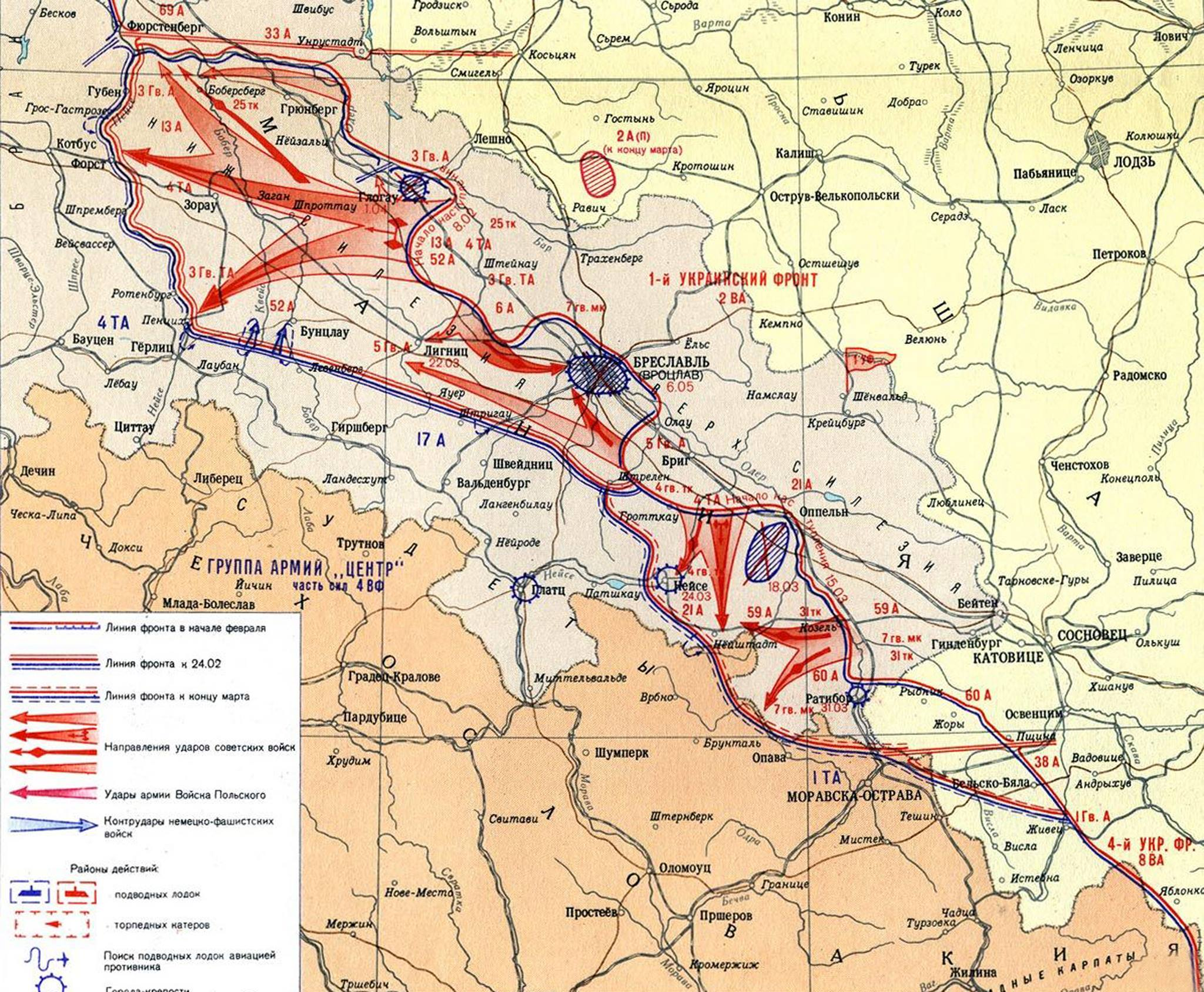
Upper Silesian Offensive. Note position of 59th Army.

Konev completed the Lower Silesian operation by February 24, after which he began laying plans for a new offensive into upper Silesia. Upon the arrival of his Front's main group of forces in the Neisse area the 59th and 60th Armies were to develop the attack from the bridgehead north of Ratibor to the west and southwest. Ultimately this operation would encircle and destroy the German group of forces in the Oppeln salient. Korovnikov chose to launch his main attack along the left flank with the forces of 115th and 93rd Rifle Corps and 7th Guards Mechanized Corps in the general direction of Kostenthal and Zultz. At this time the personnel strength of the Army's divisions varied from 4,366 to 6,690 men and women. General Kozachek placed his 135th (which had rejoined the Corps) and 92nd Divisions in first echelon with the 245th in second echelon. The Corps was to launch its main attack along the left flank in the direction of Lenschutz, Oberglogau, Repsch and Wiesengrund and break through the German defense along a 3km-wide sector and by day's end capture the line Nesselwitz–Groenweide in cooperation with 7th Guards Mechanized. On March 6 Colonel Vinogradov left the division and within days was made Kozachek's deputy commander. He was replaced by Col. Pavel Petrovich Lavrov, who would remain in command for the duration.

The offensive on the 59th and 60th Army's sector began at 0850 hours on March 15 following an 80-minute artillery preparation, and went largely according to plan although more slowly than expected. The main German defense zone was broken through on a 12km front and the Armies advanced 6-8km during the day. Bad weather prevented air support before noon, and the advancing forces also had to repel ten counterattacks. In response Konev ordered that the advance continue through the night. During the day on March 16 the 59th Army managed to advance another 3-9km, and the 93rd Corps and 7th Guards Mechanized Corps cleared the entire depth of the German defenses and set the stage for the success of the attack over the next two days. By the end of March 17 these two Corps had reached the line Tomas–Schenau–Kittledorf while the 115th covered against flank attacks from the north. The slow advance of the Corps over the latter half of March 16 and all of March 17 was later blamed on General Kozachek who exaggerated the strength of German resistance, failed to make sufficient demands on his subordinates, allowed the artillery to lag behind, and failed to continue attacking through the night. Konev personally visited the 59th Army headquarters on the 17th and directed that the 115th be deployed to the northwest to capture Oberglogau and facilitate the advance of the 93rd and 7th Guards Corps. To do so he ordered the 245th to be committed from second echelon; by the end of March 18 the Corps was to link up with 21st Army in the Elgut area. During that day 59th Army's offensive unfolded more successfully. The encirclement of the German Oppeln grouping was completed and the divisions of 115th Corps had to repel numerous counterattacks by small subunits of infantry and tanks trying to break out to the south from Oberglogau and Friedersdorf, after which it seized Walzen and reached the southern outskirts of the other two towns. The encircled forces consisted of the 20th SS, 168th and 344th Infantry Divisions, part of the 18th SS Panzergrenadier Division, and several independent regiments and battalions.

With the encirclement completed the 92nd was tasked with preventing the encircled grouping from breaking out to the south, while the 135th and 245th Divisions attacked to clear Oberglogau and reach the line Kreenbusch–Rosenberg. This was assisted by most of 7th Guards Mechanized and 93rd Rifle Corps. The German command was now making efforts to pull its encircled forces out toward the west, including a break-in attempt by the Hermann Göring Panzer Division towards Steinau. At 0830 hours on March 19, after a 10-minute fire onslaught, the 115th Corps attacked, splitting the defenders and capturing Krappitz and Oberglogau plus several wooded areas. The next day the remnants of the trapped force tried to break out toward Steinau, but were unsuccessful, while the 155th Corps mopped up the Kreenbusch area. Late in the day the 59th Army began regrouping to continue the offensive. The total German casualties in the encirclement battle were 30,000 killed, 15,000 prisoners, 21 aircraft, 57 tanks and assault guns and 464 guns of various calibers. On March 21 the 59th Army resumed its advance in the direction of Jägerndorf which it reached but did not take on March 31. Due to the toll of casualties during the offensive and inadequate supplies of ammunition, the Army was ordered to go over to the defense.

== Postwar ==
At the start of May the division was still under 115th Corps. Beginning on May 6 it advanced with its Army in the Prague offensive, and took part in the final encirclement of Army Group Center.

According to STAVKA Order No. 11096 of May 29, 1945, part 8, the 92nd is listed as one of the rifle divisions to be "disbanded in place". It was disbanded in accordance with the directive in July 1945.
