= Aarne Blick =

Finnish general

Aarne Leopold Blick
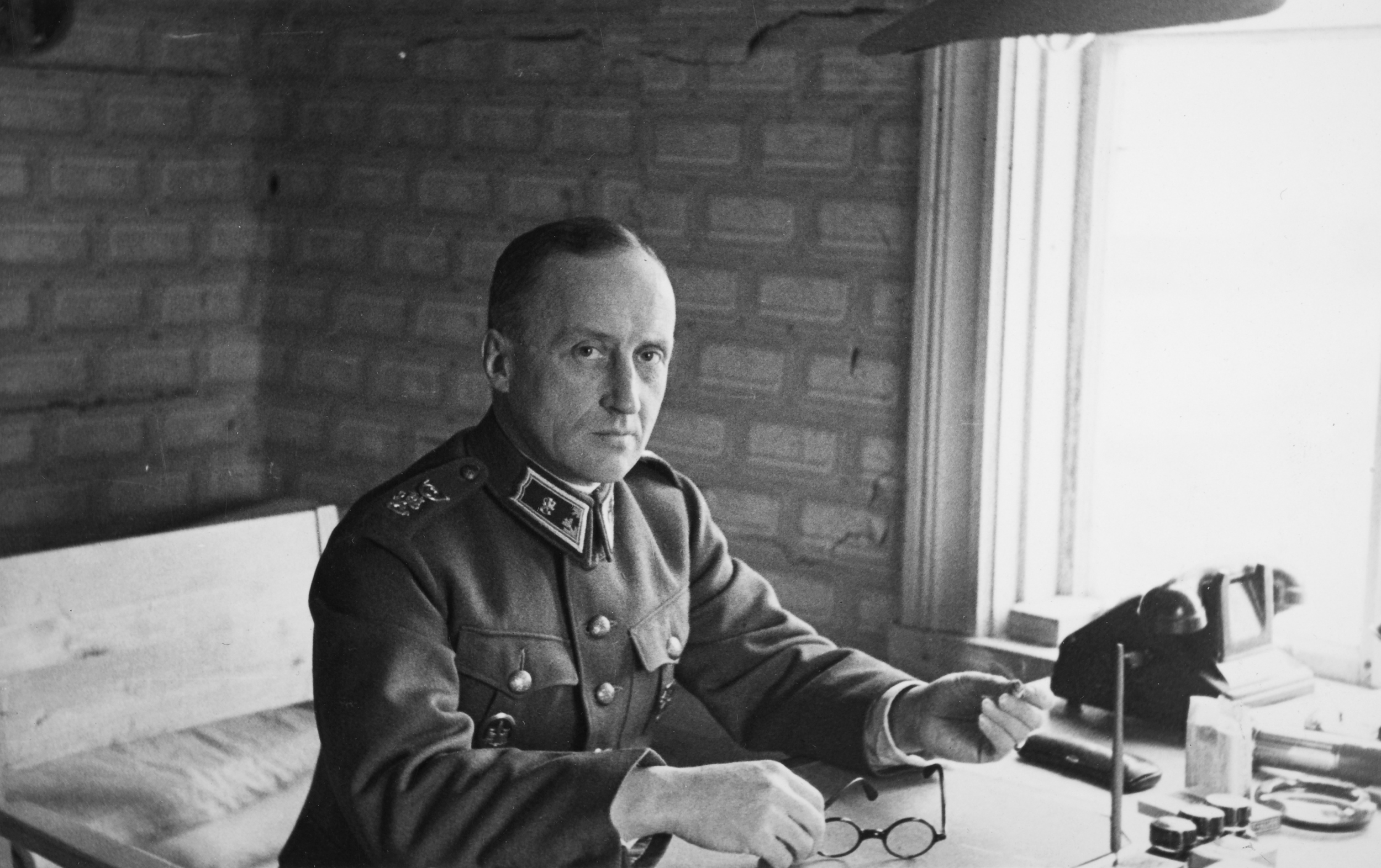
- Born: 3 February 1894; Ulvila, Grand Duchy of Finland, Russian Empire
- Died: 15 February 1964 (aged 70) Helsinki, Finland
- Allegiance: German Empire (1916–1918); Finland (1918–1947)
- Branch: Imperial German Army; Finnish Jäger troops; Finnish Army
- Service years: 1916–1954
- Rank: Lieutenant General (1947)
- Commands: 10th Division (1939); 2nd Division (1941; 1944); II Corps (1941); VI Corps (1942–44)
- Conflicts: World War I; Battle of Smārde; Finnish Civil War; Battle of Tampere; Battle of Raivola; Battle of Rajamäki; World War II; Winter War; Battle of Taipale; Continuation War; Finnish invasion of Ladoga Karelia; Vyborg–Petrozavodsk offensive; Battle of Vuosalmi
- Awards: Mannerheim Cross; Order of the Cross of Liberty; Order of the White Rose of Finland; Order of St. Olav; Order of the Crown (Romania); Iron Cross

Aarne Leopold Blick (3 February 1894 – 15 February 1964) was a Finnish lieutenant general (Finnish: kenraaliluutnantti), Knight of the Mannerheim Cross and a member of the Jäger movement. He participated in the Eastern Front of World War I, the Finnish Civil War, the Winter War and the Continuation War.

== Early life ==
Aarne Leopold Blick was born on 3 February 1894 in Ulvila to railway roadmaster Albert Blick and Selma Lund. He graduated as an abitur in 1915, working as a clerk in the Kemi police office. He became involved in the Finnish Jäger Movement, where Finnish volunteers traveled to Germany to receive military training. Blick was initially involved in organizing the movement of the volunteers in the region, but soon also traveled to Germany himself, joining the 27th Royal Prussian Jäger Battalion. As a member of the battalion's pioneer company, Blick took part in several battles in the regions of Misa and Gulf of Riga, including the Battle of Smārde. In 1916, he was given the rank of Hilfsgruppenführer (English: assistant squad leader).

Blick returned to Finland in 1918, taking part in the Finnish Civil War on the side of the Whites first as a platoon leader. Starting from 28 March 1918, he acted as a company commander in the 2nd Jäger Regiment. During the civil war, he saw combat in Tampere, Raivola and Rajamäki. He was promoted to the rank of second lieutenant (Finnish: vänrikki) on 11 February 1918.

== After the Civil War ==
Blick's military service continued after the end of the Finnish Civil War. Promoted to a lieutenant in 1919, he held various company commander positions from 1918 to 1920. In 1918 and 1919 he also taught Officer Cadet courses in Viipuri. In 1920, Blick transferred to the Finnish General Headquarters to act as staff officer and was promoted to a captain. From 1921 to 1923, he was the head of the Infantry Section of the Infantry NCO School. From 1923 to 1927 Blick served in various roles related to Finno-Soviet border affairs, starting with an assignment as the assistant to the commander of the Joensuu border guard from 1923 to 1924. He commanded the Kainuu border guard from 1924 to 1926, and the Salmi (rural locality) border guard from 1926 to 1928. During this time he was promoted to major in 1925 and graduated from a command course of the War College.

Following his time in the border guard, Blick returned to teaching. From 1928 to 1933, he was a senior teacher of tactics in the Finnish Cadet School (Finnish: kadettikoulu). During his time in this posting, in 1928, Blick was promoted to the rank of lieutenant colonel and served as the chairman of the school's honor council in 1929 and 1931. From 1933 to 1936, Blick was given command of the Battle School (Finnish: Taistelukoulu). His final command before the start of the Winter War was as the commander of the Savonia Jaeger Regiment starting from 1936. He was promoted to the rank of colonel the same year.

In 1921, Blick married Kerttu Maria Pyhälä. During their marriage, the couple had a total of two children, a boy named Matti Aarne Albert born in 1922 and a girl named Ritva Maria Marketta born in 1926.

== Winter War and Continuation War ==
When the Finno-Soviet Winter War broke out in November 1939, Blick initially commanded a sequence of smaller units, namely the Infantry Regiment 25, a formation named Group Blick and Infantry Regiment 26. On 21 December he was given temporary command of the 10th Division before being made the commander of the Taipale Sector, which saw significant action.

Following the end of the war in early 1940, Blick was initially posted into the headquarters of the peacetime III Corps and as the commander of the 3rd Division. Later in 1940, he was made commander of the Itä-Savo Military District, keeping the posting until the start of the Continuation War in the summer of 1941.

When the Finns, alongside Germans, attacked the Soviet Union in 1941, Blick initially commanded the 2nd Division. Subordinated to the II Corps, the division participated in the Finnish invasion of Ladoga Karelia on the northwestern shore of Lake Ladoga. On 24 August, the forces in the area were divided into two corps. A new I Corps would be commanded by Einar Mäkinen. II Corps, in turn, was briefly commanded by Blick until 30 August, after which he returned to the command of the 2nd Division. 1941 also saw Blick's promotion to major general and an award of Mannerheim Cross, the most distinguished Finnish military honour. In January 1942, Blick was given command of the VI Corps, a posting he would keep until 1944. Consisting of the 5th and 17th divisions, the corps was located on the Svir front, alongside the German 163rd Division and the V Corps. Following a series of Soviet counter-attacks that largely stopped by April 1942, the area stabilized into stationary warfare.

Still under Blick's command, the corps was struck by the Soviet Vyborg–Petrozavodsk offensive on 21 June 1944. Following a Soviet landing in Tuloksa, which put the corps in danger of being cut off, Blick requested permission to pull back from his superior, general Paavo Talvela. The request was denied and Blick was ordered to conduct a delaying action. Blick cut communications with Talvela, gave out orders to fall back, and only re-established communications once it was too late to countermand his orders. This caused significant animosity between Talvela and Blick, and resulted in the replacement of Blick by Armas-Eino Martola on 6 July. According to historian Antti Juutilainen, Blick's actions "saved his men". Following his removal from the command of the VI Corps, Blick was given command of the 2nd Division on the Karelian Isthmus. Under his command, the division participated in the Battle of Vuosalmi where a Soviet bridgehead over the river Vuoksi was contained.

== Post-war career and death ==
Following the end of the Continuation War, Blick continued as the commander of the 2nd Division until 1945, when he was given command of the 3rd Division. Promoted to lieutenant general, he took command of the 1st Division in 1947. He kept the posting until 1954 when he retired from military service. In his retirement, Blick continued to be active in veteran affairs. He worked as the editor-in-chief of the Kansa taisteli – miehet kertovat magazine, and held several positions of trust in organizations related to the Jäger Movement and veterans of the wars he had participated in. Blick died in Helsinki on 15 February 1964.

During his life, Blick was granted several Finnish awards, the most notable of which are the Mannerheim Cross 2nd class, the Order of the Cross of Liberty and the Order of the White Rose of Finland. He also received the Norwegian Order of St. Olav, the Romanian Order of the Crown, and the German Iron Cross (both 1st and 2nd class).
