= Battle of Vuosalmi =

1944 battle of the Continuation War

- Part of Continuation War
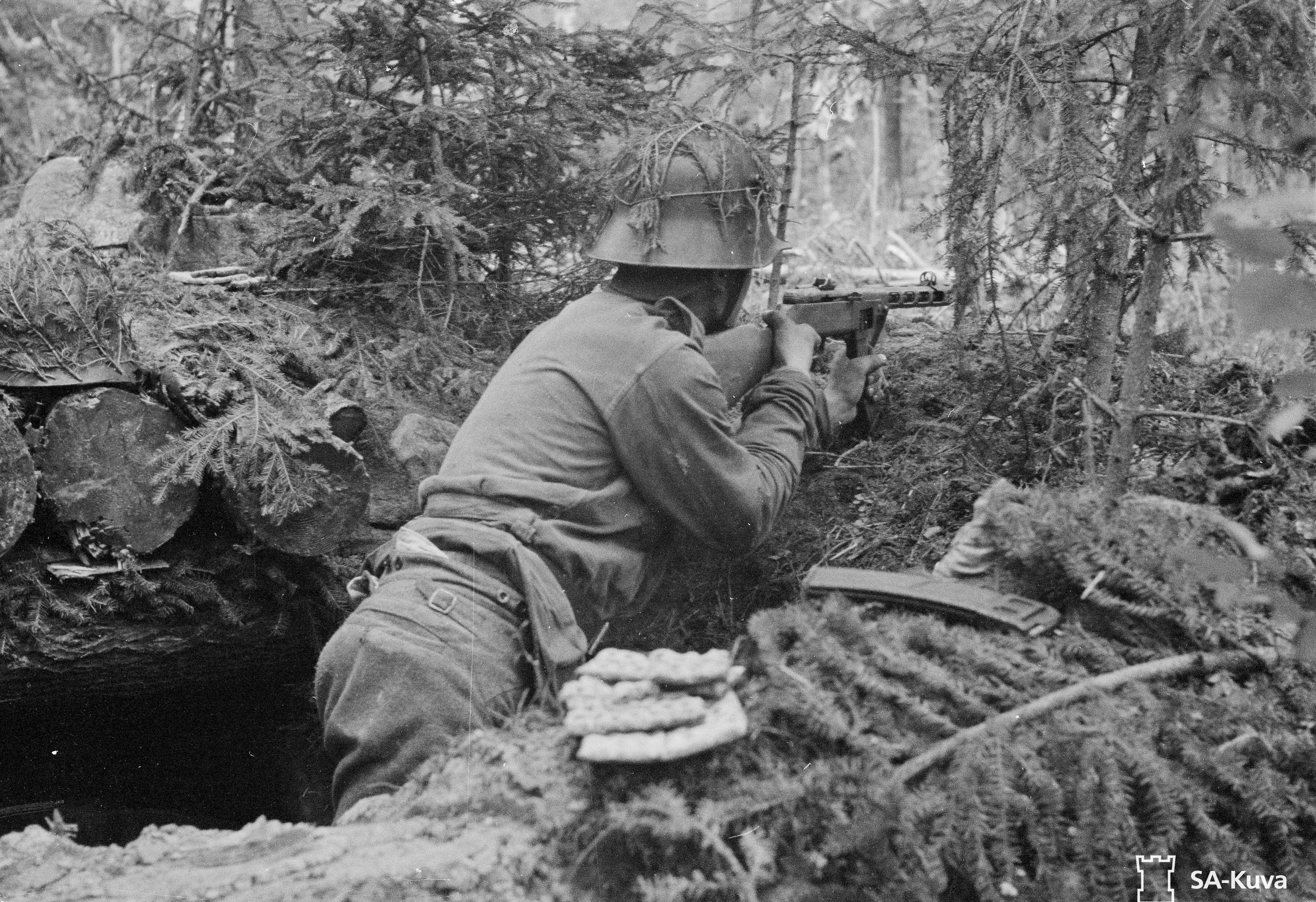
- Finnish soldier in the front line armed with a captured PPSh-41 submachine gun
Date	July 4–17, 1944
Location	60°43′5″N 29°34′30″E; Karelian Isthmus, Finland
Result	Finnish victory
Territorial changes	Soviets seize a minor bridgehead on the left bank of the River Vuoksi

Belligerents
Finland	Soviet Union

Commanders and leaders
Hjalmar Siilasvuo; Armas-Eino Martola; Aarne Blick	Vasily Shvetsov; Georgy Anisimov; Ivan Fadeev

Strength
30,000 men 25 assault guns 250 field artillery pieces (21 battalions)	75,000–80,000 men 80–90 tanks or assault guns 450 artillery pieces

Casualties and losses
795 killed 4,976 wounded 354 missing 2 assault guns	3,050 killed 11,750 wounded 250 missing 22,700 (whole 23rd Army); 60 tanks

The Battle of Vuosalmi (also known as the Battle of Äyräpää-Vuosalmi) – the main bulk of it – lasted from July 4 to July 17, 1944. It was fought during the Continuation War (1941–1944), a part of World War II, between Finland and the Soviet Union.

== Background ==
After the Soviets saw that they had failed in the Battle of Tali-Ihantala against the Finnish defenders in late June and early July 1944, they tried to break the Finnish positions in Vuosalmi (now Druzhnoye) and encircle the southern part of the Finnish forces on the Karelian Isthmus. Soviet forces of the 23rd Army in the region had made unsuccessful low-scale attacks against the Finnish defenses for nearly two weeks in the Äyräpää region. Lack of success from the 23rd Army's performance led to a change of command on July 3.

== Order of battle ==
=== Finnish ===
Finnish defenses on the Vuosalmi consisted initially of only the 2nd Division (Martola, later Blick). But this was later reinforced with parts of the Armored Division (Lagus), the 57th Infantry Regiment and the 25th Separate Battalion of the 15th Infantry Division and the 4th Battalion of the 19th Brigade (IV/19.Pr) after the battles in the Tali-Ihantala region started to slow down. A total of 21 artillery battalions were supporting infantry during the critical last stage of the battle, surpassing the amount of artillery support present at Tali-Ihantala.

Main force:

III Corps (Siilasvuo)

2nd Infantry Division (Martola / Blick)

At the last stage:

57th Infantry Regiment & 25th Separate Battalion of the 15th Infantry Division
4th Battalion of the 19th Infantry Brigade
1 Assault Gun and 4 Jäger Battalions of the Finnish Armoured Division

Total forces initially ~20,000, growing to ~32,000 by mid-July. Average personal strength of infantry division around 13,300 men, while 6,700-7,000 of infantry brigade, 3,620 of infantry regiment and 1,022 of infantry battalion. 21 field artillery battalions (average 520-560 men each).

=== Soviet ===
The Soviet Leningrad Front's (Govorov) 23rd Army (Shvetsov) was assigned the task of making a crossing and a breakthrough at Vuosalmi. For this task the 23rd Army was first assigned the 98th Rifle Corps, and later switched to the 115th Rifle Corps.

23rd Army (Shvetsov)

98th Rifle Corps (Anisimov)

92nd Rifle Division (transferred to 115th Rifle Corps on 8th July)
281st Rifle Division
381st Rifle Division

6th Rifle Corps (Fadeev)

13th Rifle Division
382nd Rifle Division
327th Rifle Division

115th Rifle Corps (S. B. Kozatsek)

10th Rifle Division
142nd Rifle Division

Total: 8 infantry divisions, 80-90 tanks or assault/self-propelled guns and around 600 field artillery pieces or heavy mortars. Average personal strength of rifle divisions was around 6,600-6,700 men.

== The battle ==
The Finnish positions were very unfavorably located on the ridge of Äyräpää, with the wide River Vuoksi behind it. Though the position was very unfavorable, the Äyräpää ridge dominated the lower terrain on the northern shore, requiring the defensive lines to be placed on the ridge. The Red Army's 98th Corps initiated heavier attacks on July 4 and heavy battles raged for control of the ridge until July 9 when the Finns finally withdrew to the northern shore. The Soviet 115th Corps then continued the attack and crossed the Vuosalmi on July 9. During that day, both Soviet and Finnish forces had their highest numbers of artillery and mortar rounds fired: 30,000 (Soviet forces) and 18,800 (Finnish, 13,500 of which were field artillery rounds).

The Soviet 115th Corps reinforced the bridgehead and had all three of its divisions in the bridgehead on July 11. The Finnish forces also received reinforcements in the form of the depleted Finnish Armored Division directly from the Ihantala, and on July 11 both sides were attempting to attack simultaneously. Attempts on both sides were halted when they ran into attacking enemy formations. Though the Soviets now had access to the open fields on the northern shore, which were advantageous for Soviet armor, the Finns were able to stop all further Soviet advances. The following Finnish counterattacks in Vuosalmi at this point amounted to limited success, and thus both sides were on the defensive by mid-July.

The Finnish field artillery fired altogether over 122,000 rounds of ordnance in Äyräpää and Vuosalmi, from June 20 to July 17 – the same amount as in the Battle of Tali-Ihantala, which was fought during exactly the same time period in a nearby vicinity, on the relatively narrow Karelian Isthmus of Finland. Mortar units fired 85,000 rounds. When comparing the 8 day period of the most intensive fighting, significantly more artillery rounds were fired in Vuosalmi (74,000) than in Tali-Ihantala (56,000). During that 8 day period in Vuosalmi, Finnish mortar units fired 52,000 rounds. Finnish field artillery especially during the latter part of battle fired relatively heavy rounds. On 16 July the average weight of rounds were around 28 kilos.

== Aftermath ==
The commander of the Soviet Leningrad Front, Marshal Leonid Govorov heavily criticized the 23rd Army, 98th Corps and 115th Corps commanders when the offensive in Vuosalmi failed to yield any concrete results, despite the heavy casualties sustained.

== Gallery ==
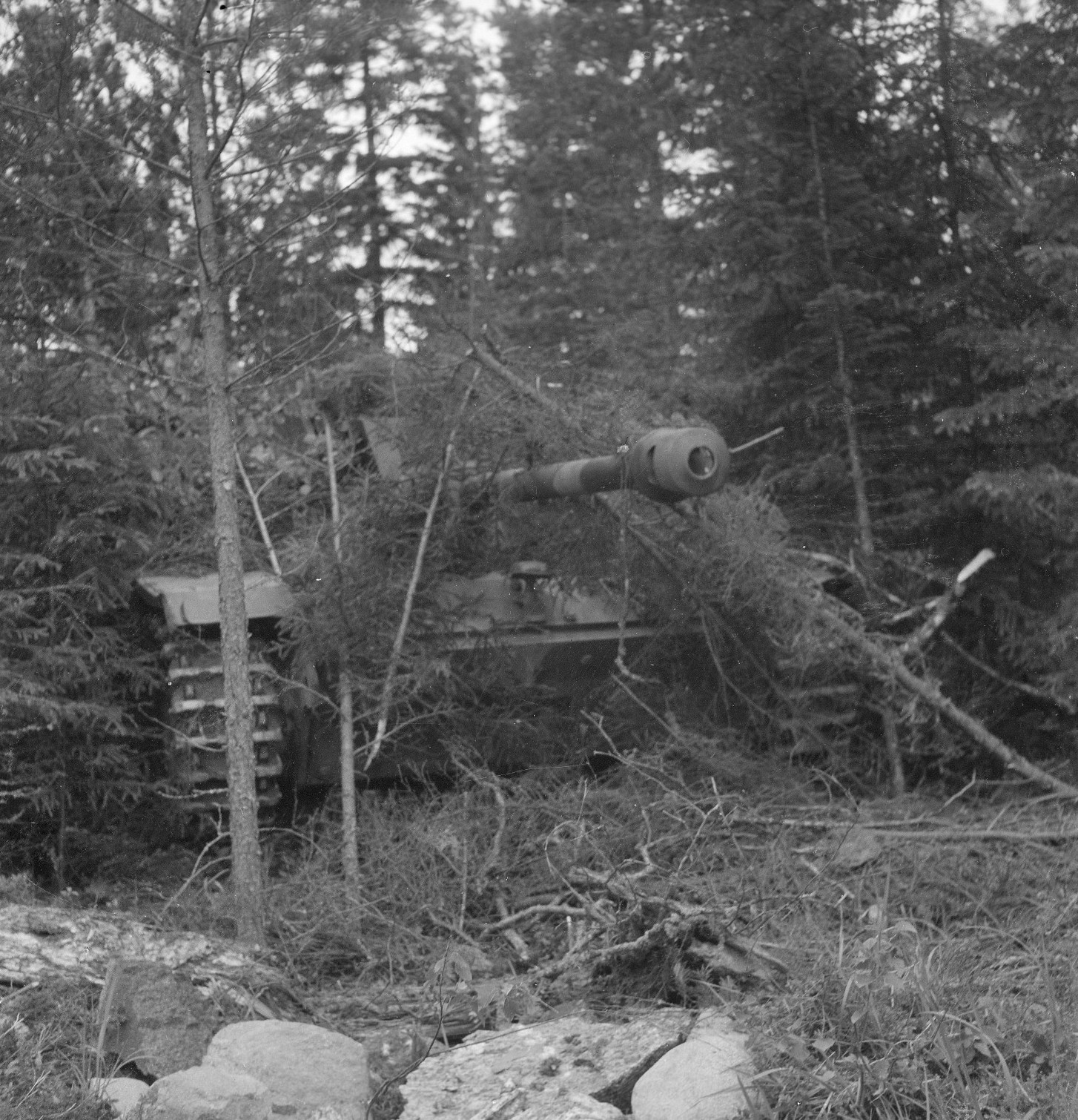
Camouflaged Finnish Sturmgeschütz III assault gun on the battlefield

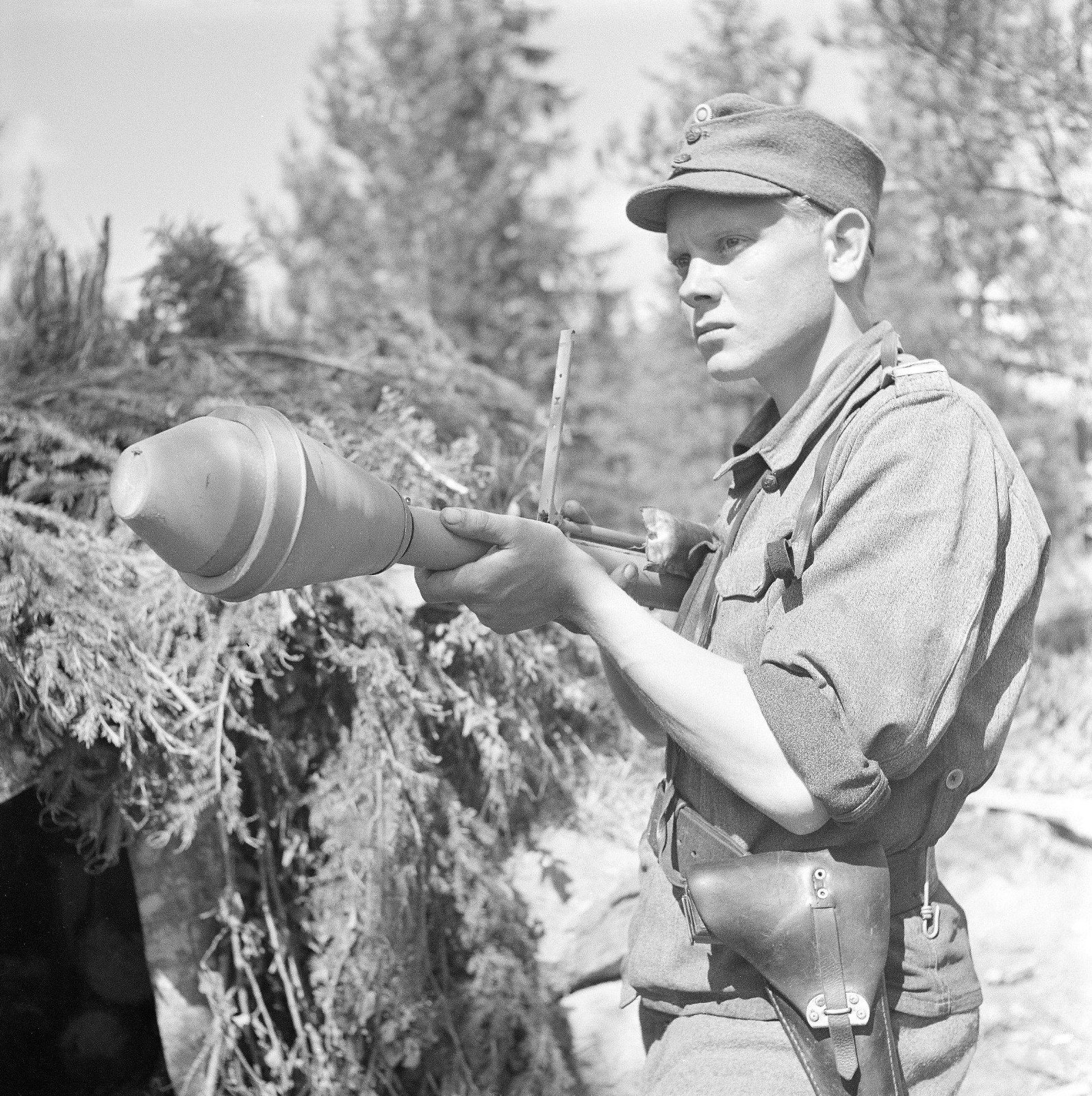
Corporal Franz Haapala used Panzerfaust to destroy a Soviet IS series heavy tank

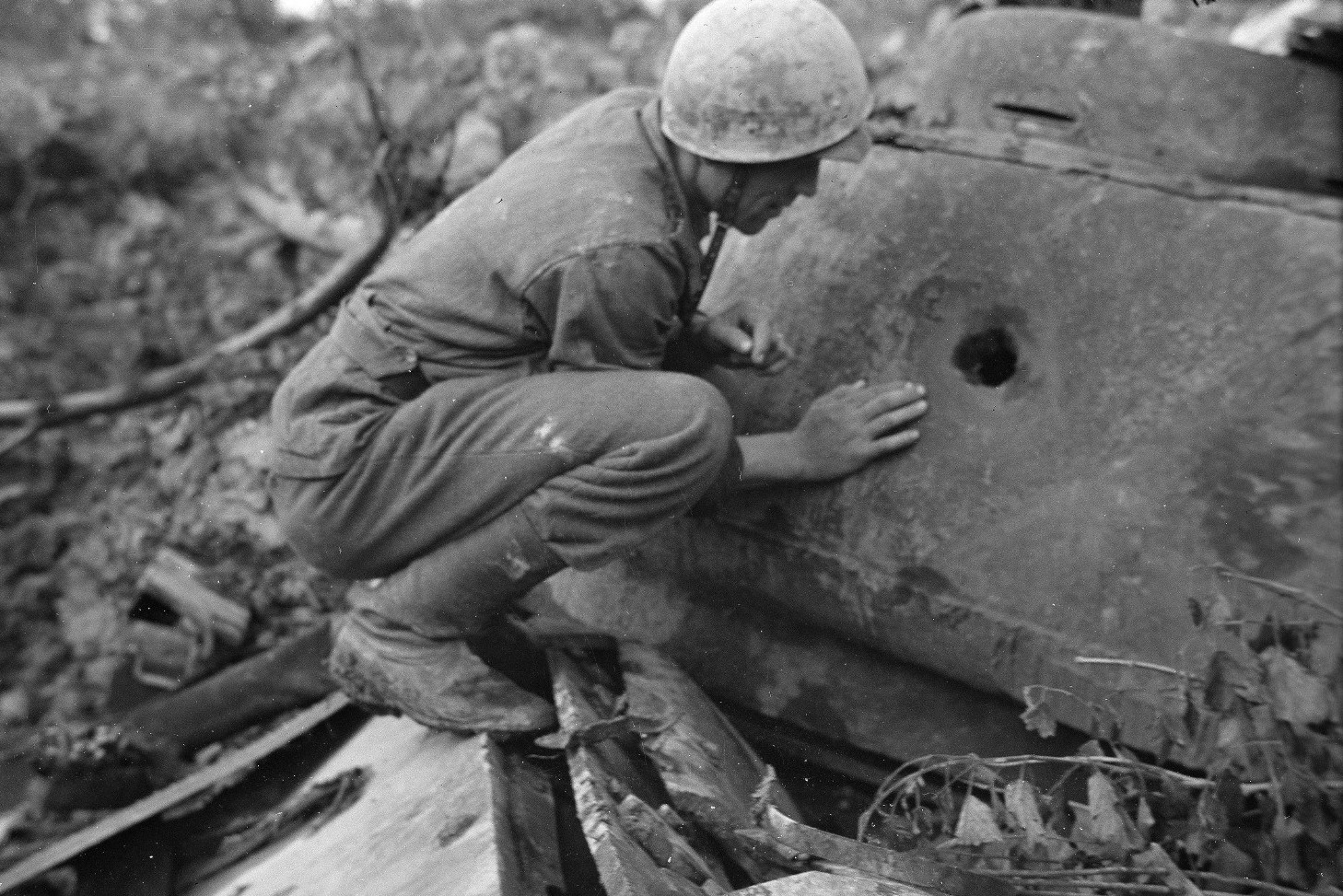
Fist-sized hole made by a Panzerfaust ("Armor fist") warhead

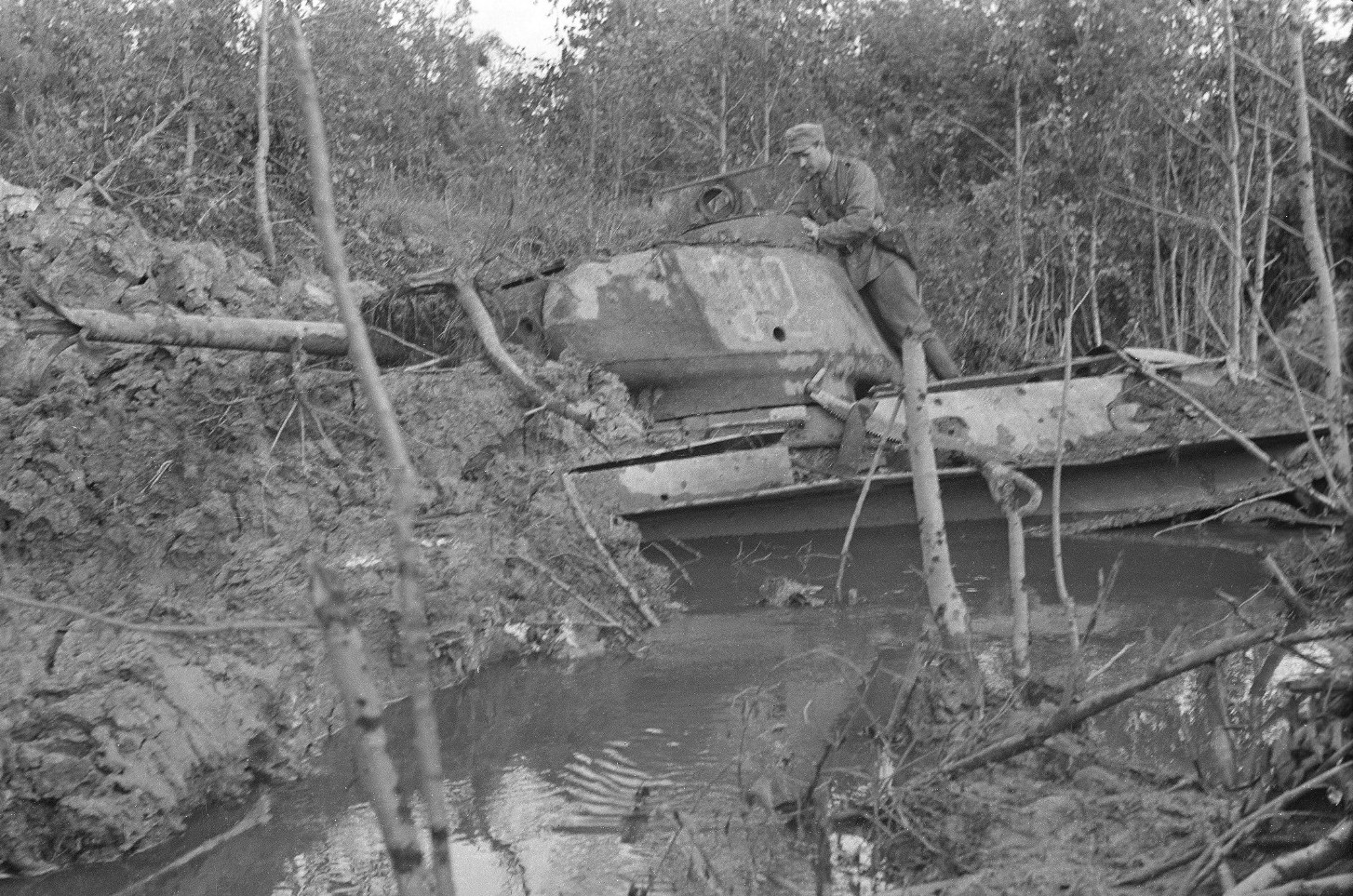
Soviet tank destroyed during the battle

== Sources ==
- Raunio, Ari; Kilin, Juri (2008). Jatkosodan Torjuntataisteluita 1942–44. Keuruu: Otava.
- Leskinen, Jari; Juutilainen, Antti (2005). Jatkosodan pikkujättiläinen. WSOY. ISBN 9510286907.
