= Vuosalmi =

Former village of Finland on the Karelian Isthmus, now in Russia

- Village
- State: Finland
- Province: Viipuri Province
- Circuit: Viipuri circuit
- Municipality: Äyräpää

Area
  - Total: 57.3 km^{2} (22.1 sq mi)

Population (1939)
  - Total: approx. 1,000
  - Density: 17/km^{2} (44/sq mi)
- Time zone: UTC+3
- Notes: The area of the village currently belongs to Russia, but the village no longer exists.

Vuosalmi (now Druzhnoye) is a former village of Finland on the Karelian Isthmus, now in Russia. It is located on the northern shore of the Vuoksi River and served as the location of the Battle of Vuosalmi in 1944.

Vuosalmi was a village in the municipality of Äyräpää on the Karelian Isthmus in the Viipuri Province, located in the territory ceded to the Soviet Union. Today, the village is uninhabited and its area belongs to the Priozersky District of the Leningrad Oblast in Russia. By area, Vuosalmi was the largest village in the municipality of Äyräpää and comprised the northeastern part of the municipality, which was separated from the rest of Äyräpää by the Vuoksi. Vuosalmi bordered the municipality of Vuoksenranta to the north, the municipality of Vuoksela to the east, Äyräpää's church village Pölläkkälä to the south, and the village of Paakkola to the west. The area of this extensive village was 57.3 km² and it was 15 kilometers in length. In 1939, the village had approximately 1,000 inhabitants. In addition to the main village center, which was located along the Vuoksi River opposite the Äyräpää church village, the village included Kalliola along the highway leading towards Antrea, Salonkylä in the absolute northern part of the village behind the community forest, and Ventelä at the crossroads of the highway leading to Vuoksela.

== Village Description ==
Vuosalmi was located along good transport routes. Highways led from the village through Räisälä to Käkisalmi, which was 74 kilometers away; through Vuoksela to Kiviniemi, which was 35 kilometers away; and through Vuoksenranta to Antrea, which was 40 kilometers away. Crossing the Vuoksi via the ferry connection flowing between Vuosalmi and the Äyräpää church village took five minutes. A winter ice road was used during the winter. Replacing the ferry with a bridge was planned in the 1930s. On the church village side, there was a highway connection via Main Road 62 to Viipuri, which was 58 kilometers away. The Äyräpää station of the Viipuri–Valkjärvi railway was also located on the bank on the church village side. Ships on the Vuoksi had important logistical significance before buses became widespread and the railway was completed.

The Vuosalmi school district was established in 1900, and the school began operating in the Pasuri house in 1902. Before establishing its own school, Vuosalmi had belonged to the Mälkölä school district. The Vuosalmi school building was completed in 1906. However, the number of students in the village grew, and in 1926, construction began on a second school, which was named the Kalliola school. Both school buildings were destroyed in the Winter War. The Keski-Vuoksi Co-operative Store had two shops in the village: one in the village center next to the ferry pier and another in Kalliola. The Vuosalmi youth association hall was also located in Kalliola. The Civil Guard, Lotta Svärd, a Martha association, and the sports club Salmen Veikot also operated in the village.

== Livelihoods ==
Agriculture was the main livelihood of Vuosalmi. Vuosalmi had once been part of the donated lands (donation fiefdoms) of the Ventelä manor. The state purchased the donated land in 1886 and divided it into hereditary farms for the tenant farmers in 1901. The state retained the 1,898-hectare forests of the donated land as a crown forest, from which a community forest was formed in 1909. In 1939, the village had 1,200 hectares of fields, which was about one-fifth of the village's total area. There were 125 farms in the same year. To promote cattle farming, an inspection association and a milk sales cooperative were established.

Many residents of Vuosalmi also earned their living from industry. The Juvonen felt and spinning factory and the Karjala felt factory operated in the village, employing about 90 people, alongside the Pasuri sawmill and mill (approx. 60 employees), the Rämö Brothers Machine Shop, the state-owned Ventelä mill, and the Pykälä sawmill.

== History ==
Vuosalmi, which originally belonged to Muolaa, had six houses in 1553. In 1914, Vuosalmi was separated from the Muolaa parish into the new Vuoksela parish and became part of the Vuoksela municipality, which began operations in 1917. Vuosalmi belonged to Vuoksela for only nine years, because in 1926, the municipality of Äyräpää was formed from the northern part of Muolaa, which Vuosalmi then joined. In the year of joining, the village had 930 inhabitants.

After the Winter War began in 1939, the population of Vuosalmi was evacuated further west into Finland right at the start of the war in December. In the 1940 Moscow Peace Treaty, the area was ceded to the Soviet Union, but Finland reclaimed the area at the beginning of the Continuation War in 1941, and the village's residents were able to return to their ruined home village. 739 residents, or about 74 percent, managed to take advantage of the opportunity to return. Reconstruction was interrupted in 1944 when the Soviet major offensive began, and the village residents were evacuated once again. The Mannerheim Line ran south of Vuosalmi, and Vuosalmi remained in the possession of Finnish troops until the end of both wars, but in the peace treaty, the village remained on the Soviet Union's side.
