= Vuoksela =

Former municipality of Finland, ceded to the Soviet Union

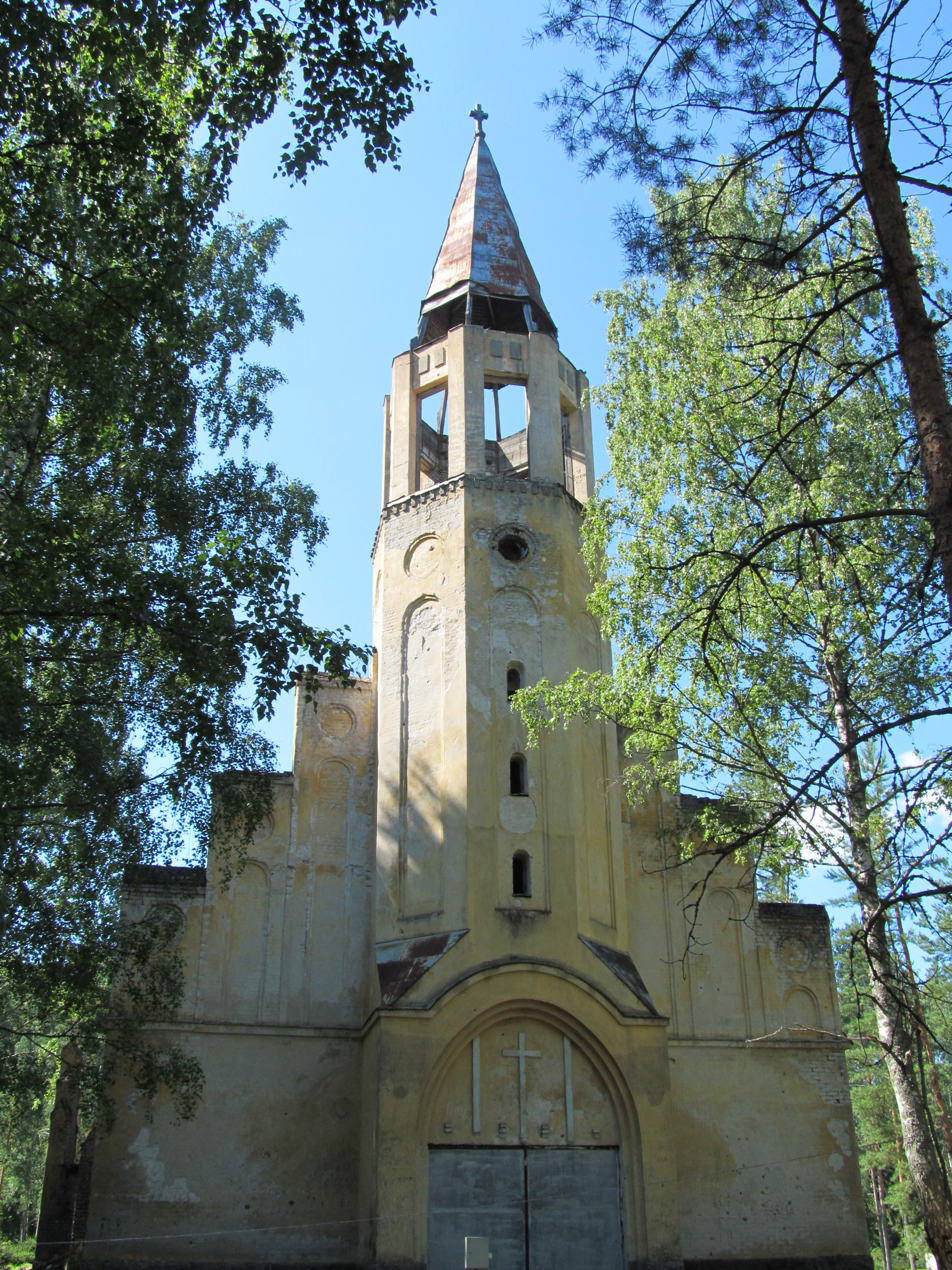
Ruins of the Lutheran church of Vuoksela

Vuoksela (Finnish: Vuoksela) is a former rural locality on Karelian Isthmus, in Priozersky District of Leningrad Oblast, located on the western shore of the northern armlet of Vuoksi River. Until the Winter War and Continuation War, it had been the administrative center of the Vuoksela municipality of the Viipuri province of Finland. In 1929 a Lutheran church was built there, which has remained until now.
