= Baryshevo, Leningrad Oblast =

Village in Leningrad Oblast, Russia

Coordinates: 60.700°N 29.583°E

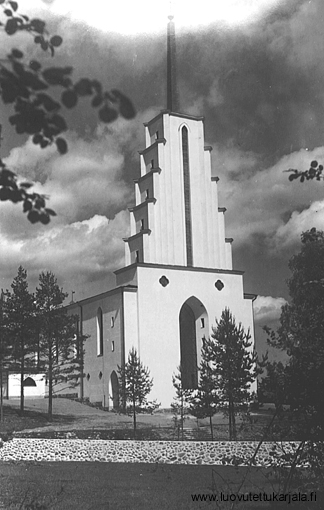
The Lutheran church of Äyräpää. Built in 1934, destroyed in 1940 in the Winter War

Baryshevo (Russian: Барышево; Finnish: Pölläkkälä, Äyräpää) is a rural locality on Karelian Isthmus, in Vyborgsky District of Leningrad Oblast. It is situated on the southern shore of Vuoksi River. Until the Winter War and Continuation War, it had been the administrative center of the Äyräpää municipality of the Viipuri Province of Finland.

== History ==
The village received the name Baryshevo in July 1948 in memory of lieutenant Baryshev Leonid Aleksandrovich, commander of the artillery platoon of the 60th Art Regiment of the 92nd Infantry Division of the Red Army, who died fighting near Vyborg during the Vyborg–Petrozavodsk offensive.

== See also ==
- Battle of Vuosalmi
