= Armas-Eino Martola =

Finnish general (1896–1986)

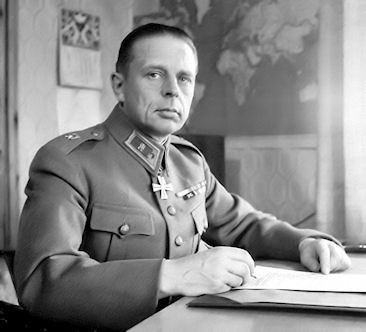
- Born: 12 May 1896; Raahe, Grand Duchy of Finland, Russian Empire
- Died: 5 February 1986 (aged 89) Helsinki
- Buried: Hietaniemi cemetery, Helsinki
- Allegiance: German Empire (1915–1918); Finland (1918–)
- Branch: Imperial German Army; Finnish Jäger troops; Finnish Army
- Service years: 1915–1944; 1956–1969
- Rank: General of the Infantry (1982)
- Commands: 1st Division (1940); 2nd Division (1942–1944); VI Corps (1944); Military advisor to Secretary-General of the United Nations (1956–1957, 1958); UNFICYP (1966–1969)
- Conflicts: World War I; Eastern Front; Finnish Civil War; Battle of Tampere; World War II; Winter War; Continuation War; Finnish invasion of Ladoga Karelia; Finnish invasion of the Karelian Isthmus; Svir–Petrozavodsk offensive; Battle of Ilomantsi
- Awards: Mannerheim Cross; Grand Cross of the Order of the Lion of Finland; Order of the Cross of Liberty; Order of the White Rose of Finland; Order of Orange-Nassau; Order of the Crown (Belgium); Order of the Southern Cross; Order of the Star of Italian Solidarity; Order of St. Olav; Order of Polonia Restituta; Legion of Honour; Order of the Crown (Romania); Order of the Sword; Order of the Dannebrog; Iron Cross
- Other work: Deputy Minister of Foreign Affairs (1944); Governor (Finnish: maaherra) of Uusimaa Province (1944–1946)

Armas-Eino Martola (12 May 1896 – 5 February 1986) was a Finnish general of the infantry (Finnish: jalkaväenkenraali), a knight of the Mannerheim Cross and a member of the Jäger Movement. He participated in the Eastern Front of World War I, the Finnish Civil War, the Winter War and the Continuation War. In his later years, he acted as the military advisor to the Secretary-General of the United Nations Dag Hammarskjöld and led the United Nations Peacekeeping Force in Cyprus from 1966 to 1969.

== Early life ==
Armas-Eino Martola was born on 12 May 1896 in Raahe to doctor Johan Martola and Anna Maria Cecilia Simelius. Martola graduated as an ylioppilas in 1914 and began to study theology. He soon became involved in the Jäger Movement, where Finnish volunteers received military training in Germany, leaving for Germany in late 1915. While in Germany, the Finnish volunteers formed the 27th Royal Prussian Jäger Battalion, fighting for the Imperial German Army on the Eastern Front of World War I. During this time, he took part in several battles in the regions of Misa, Gulf of Riga and Lielupe.

Martola returned to Finland on 25 February 1918 to fight on the side of the Whites in the Finnish Civil War. Promoted to a lieutenant, he served as a platoon leader in the 1st Jäger Regiment before being wounded in the Lempäälä region during the Battle of Tampere. Later in 1918, he was made an adjutant for a battalion and a company commander before being transferred to the Viipuri Officer Cadet School where he taught until 1919. In 1919, Martola was transferred to the Finnish General HQ and promoted to the rank of captain.

Between 1919 and 1921 Martola studied at the French École supérieure de guerre as the first Finnish officer to do so. After his return to Finland, Martola was promoted to a major in 1922, becoming the head of the General HQ Operations Department. In 1923, he married Aune Kyllikki Ignatius with whom he had had three children between 1924 and 1934.

In 1924, he was briefly made the assistant director of the War College before becoming the head of the General HQ department in charge of mobilization from 1925 to 1927. During his tenure in this position, he was also promoted to a lieutenant colonel in 1926. In 1927, Martola took command of the Savo Jäger Regiment, before being posted as a military attaché to France and Belgium between 1928 and 1931. Returning to Finland in 1931, Martola was promoted to colonel and made the head of the General HQ department of statistics and foreign affairs. In 1933, he was made the chief of staff for the White Guard, where for an extended period he also carried out the duties of the White Guard commander, Lieutenant General Lauri Malmberg, during the latter's leave of absence.

== Winter War and Continuation War ==
At the onset of the Winter War, Martola was made the chief of staff of kotijoukot (home front, lit. home forces). Subordinated to both the Finnish General HQ and the Ministry of Defence, this command was tasked with organizing the replacement of casualties, the founding and training of new units and securing the home front areas. Towards the end of the war, in early 1940, he was given command of the 1st Division on the Karelian Isthmus, but returned to his posting as the chief of staff of home forces after the end of the war, later in 1940. He was promoted to the rank of general major in 1941.

When the Continuation War started in 1941, Martola initially continued in his posting as the chief of staff of the home forces. He was given command of the 2nd Division in 1942, which he led until 1944 when he was given command of the VI Corps. The Soviet Vyborg–Petrozavodsk offensive, and especially the a Soviet landing in Tuloksa, had put the corps in danger of being cut off in the Svir sector. Following the landings, the VI Corps's commander, Aarne Blick, had disobeyed a direct command to conduct a delaying action rather than outright retreating, causing significant animosity between Blick and his superior Paavo Talvela. Martola replaced Blick on 6 July. Under Martola's command, VI Corps retreated to the northern shores of Lake Ladoga. Events in the region eventually led to the Battle of Ilomantsi, where the encirclement of Soviet forces forced the Soviet 32nd Army to focus on rescue efforts rather than continued offensive. Martola was awarded the Mannerheim Cross for his role in the defensive actions of 1944.

== Post-war career ==
When the Urho Castrén Cabinet was formed in late September 1944, it was considered necessary to have two foreign ministers. Martola was appointed deputy foreign minister under the experienced Carl Enckell. In this capacity, he unsuccessfully attempted to find ways to prevent the dissolution of the White Guard organization. The Castrén government resigned in November 1944, and Martola was then appointed Governor (maaherra) of Uusimaa Province. He faced criticism from communists who had re-entered public life after years of underground activity. In the spring of 1946, he was dismissed on the initiative of Interior Minister Yrjö Leino, in what was part of the far left's so-called "spring cleaning." Martola subsequently moved into the paper industry, serving among other roles as director of the Paper Office from 1949 to 1963. During his civilian career, Martola also acted as the chairman of the Finnish Red Cross (1951–1962), the Finno-Belgian Trade Association (1951–1962), the committee for organizing the 1952 Summer Olympics in Helsinki (1952), the board of the Foundation of Knights of the Mannerheim Cross (1954–1964), the delegation of the Foundation of the Knights of the Mannerheim Cross (1964–1977), the Foundation of Infantry (1958–1973) and the Jäger Union.

During the Suez Crisis in 1956, Martola was called to serve as military advisor to Secretary-General of the United Nations Dag Hammarskjöld. He held the position between 1956 and 1957, and briefly again in 1958. In 1966, Martola was promoted to the rank of lieutenant general and given command of the United Nations Peacekeeping Force in Cyprus. He held the position until 1969, becoming the last of the Finnish jäger officers to serve in a military role. Having been promoted to the rank of general of the infantry in 1982, Martola died on 6 February 1986 in Helsinki. He is buried in the Hietaniemi cemetery.

During his life, Martola was granted several Finnish awards, the most notable of which are the Mannerheim Cross 2nd class, the Grand Cross of the Order of the Lion of Finland, Order of the Cross of Liberty, Order of the White Rose of Finland and Medal for humane benevolence (Pro Benignitate Humana). He was also a recipient of many foreign awards, such as the Dutch Order of Orange-Nassau, the Belgian Order of the Crown, the Brazilian Order of the Southern Cross, the Italian Order of the Star of Italian Solidarity, the Norwegian Order of St. Olav, the Polish Order of Polonia Restituta, the French Legion of Honour, the Romanian Order of the Crown, the Swedish Order of the Sword, the Danish Order of the Dannebrog and the German Iron Cross.

== Bibliography ==
- C. G. Mannerheim. Suomen marsalkka (1951)
- Esipuhe. Siiranmäki – Vuosalmi. 2 D:n taistelukertomus 9.6 – 18.7.1944 (1954)
- Sodassa ja rauhassa. Muistelmia (1973).
