= Battle of Taipale =

Battle in Winter War 1939

- Part of the Winter War
Date	6 December 1939 – 27 December 1939
Location	Metsäpirtti, Karelian Isthmus 60°30′26″N 29°00′45″E
Result	Finnish victory

Belligerents
Finland	Soviet Union

Commanders and leaders
(Finland) Hugo Österman	(Soviet Union) Vladimir Grendal (Note: Grendal was at the beginning of the Battles of Taipale the commander of 7th Army Right Wing Group, then from late December 1939 the commander of the newly formed 13th Army.)

Units involved
(Finland) 10th Division	(Soviet Union) 4th Rifle Division (Soviet Union) 49th Rifle Division (Soviet Union) 142nd Rifle Division (Soviet Union) 150th Rifle Division (Soviet Union) 39th Armored Brigade

Casualties and losses
2,250 killed and wounded	(Soviet Union) 10,000+ (executed)
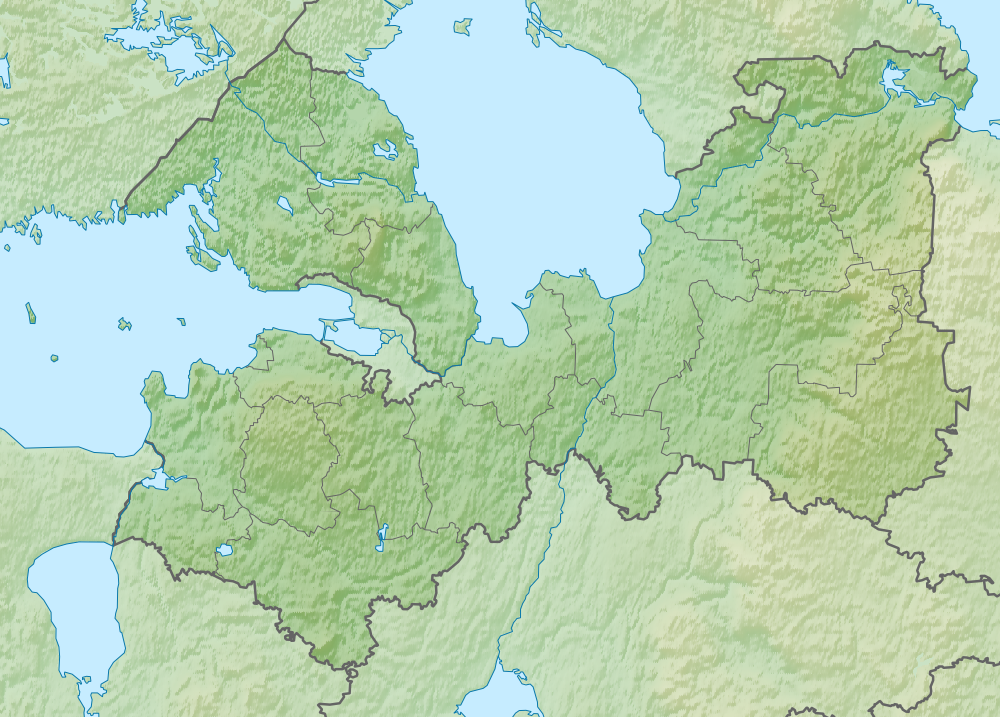
- Location within Leningrad Oblast Battle of Taipale (Finland)

The Battle of Taipale was a series of battles fought during the Winter War between Finland and Soviet Union from 6 to 27 December 1939. The battles were part of a Soviet campaign to penetrate the Finnish Mannerheim Line in the Karelian Isthmus region to open a route into southern Finland. Despite their numerical superiority, the Soviet forces were unable to break through the Finnish defences.

== Prelude: 30 November – 6 December ==
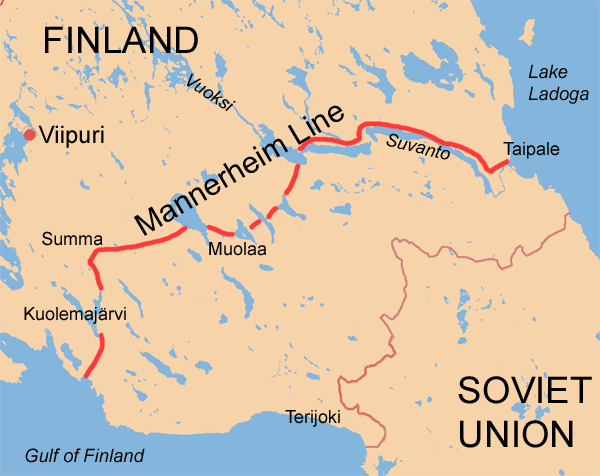
Position of Taipale at eastern end of Mannerheim Line.

On 30 November, Soviet forces crossed the Finnish border and bombarded civilian targets from the air. The Karelian Isthmus was split into two military sectors by both belligerents: one on the side of Lake Ladoga and the other on the side of the Gulf of Finland. In the Ladoga sector, the Soviet commanding officer was Vladimir Grendahl and on the Finnish side, Erik Heinrichs. On 3 December, Grendahl received orders to make a breakthrough in his sector, as the defenders in the other sector were more numerous and offered fiercer resistance. The former objective of reaching Viipuri on the Gulf side of the Karelian Isthmus became a secondary priority. The attack began on 6 December, when the Finns had retreated to the Mannerheim Line.

== The battle: 6–27 December ==
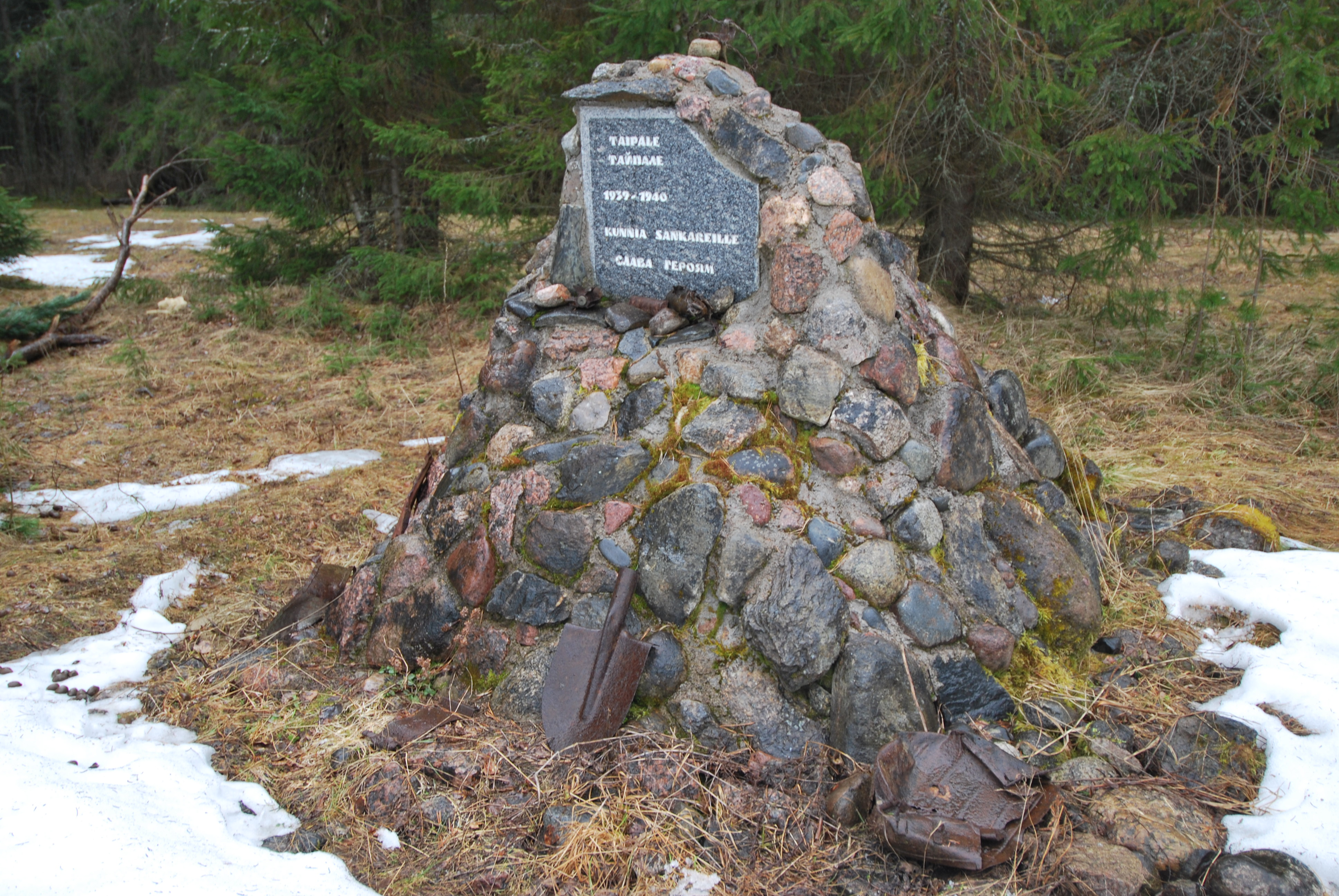
Memorial near Solovyovo (Taipale)

The Battle of Taipale began on 6 December, started when the Soviet 49th and 150th Rifle Divisions of the 7th Army tried to cross the Taipale River at three locations.

According to Chew, "The 7th Army's offensive began in earnest on 15 December, when a new attack was launched against the eastern sector of the Line near Taipale. The same bloody scenario was repeated with fresh Soviet troops the next two days. Having an excellent field of fire, the Finnish gunners inflicted prohibitive losses on the enemy who had to advance across open fields and ice."

Chew further states, "The endurance of the 10th Division at Taipale was remarkable. No other sector was subjected to such prolonged punishment - by artillery, aircraft, and ground attacks which frequently developed into major offensives. With the failure of these attacks, the fighting on the Isthmus reached a stalemate. Already on 27 December Soviet troops had been observed building field fortifications in the Summa sector, indicating a defensive posture."
