= Solovyovo, Priozersky District, Leningrad Oblast =

Rural locality in Priozersky District, Russia

Coordinates: 60°38′N 30°30′E

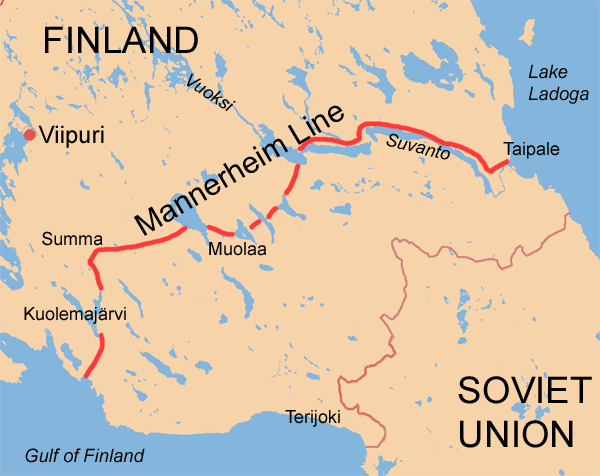
Taipale at the eastern end of the Mannerheim Line (pre-1940 border)

Solovyovo (Russian: Соловьёво; Finnish: Taipale), formerly Taipale, is a rural locality (a settlement) in Priozersky District of Leningrad Oblast, Russia, located on the western shore of Lake Ladoga on the Karelian Isthmus about 80 kilometers (50 mi) north of Saint Petersburg. The settlement is approximately 100 kilometers (62 mi) east-southeast of the post-Winter War border with Finland. Vuoksi River's southern armlet Burnaya empties into Lake Ladoga at Solovyovo. As of January 1997, its population was 7.

== History ==
Taipale, at the Mannerheim Line then approximately 20 kilometers (12 mi) from the Finnish–Soviet border, became known for heavy fighting during the Battle of Taipale in December 1939 during the Winter War between Finland and the Soviet Union. The area was held by the Finnish forces until the end of that war, when all of the Karelian Isthmus was ceded to the Soviet Union and had to be evacuated in haste.
