= Vladimir Grendal =

Soviet colonel general (1884–1940)

Vladimir Davydovich Grendal
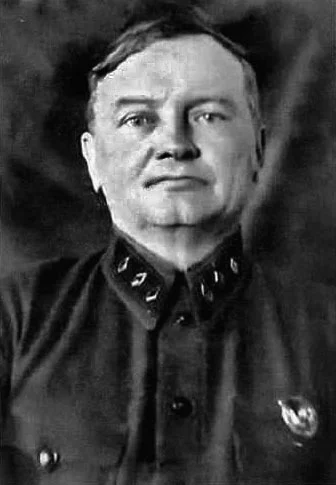
- Grendal, c. 1938
- Native name: Владимир Давыдович Грендаль
- Born: 3 April [O.S. 22 March] 1884; Sveaborg, Grand Duchy of Finland, Russian Empire
- Died: 16 November 1940 (aged 56) Moscow, Soviet Union
- Buried: Novodevichy Cemetery
- Allegiance: Russian Empire; Russian SFSR (Soviet Union from 1922)
- Branch: Imperial Russian Army; Red Army
- Service years: 1902–1940
- Rank: Colonel general
- Commands: 13th Army
- Conflicts: World War I; Russian Civil War; World War II; Winter War
- Awards: Order of Lenin; Order of the Red Banner; Order of the Red Star

Vladimir Davydovich Grendal (Russian: Владимир Давыдович Грендаль; 3 April [O.S. 22 March] 1884 – 16 November 1940) was a Red Army colonel general and artillery theorist who held army command during the Winter War.

== Early life, World War I, and Russian Civil War ==
Vladimir Davydovich Gröndal (later Grendal; Finnish: Wladimir Davidinpoika Gröndahl) was born in Sveaborg, Finland, on 3 April [O.S. 22 March] 1884. The son of David Ioganovich Grendal, a Swedish-speaking Finnish reserve officer in the Russian Imperial Army. His mother was Russian. Grendal graduated from the Pskov Cadet Corps in 1902 and entered the Mikhailovskoye Artillery School. His father was mortally wounded in the Battle of Mukden during the Russo-Japanese War. Graduating from the school in 1905, he completed advanced training at the Mikhailovskaya Artillery Academy in 1911. He served at the Main Artillery Range, and from May 1915 commanded the 1st Naval Heavy Artillery Battalion. In this capacity, Grendal fought in the battles on the Dvinsk and Riga axis, in which he was wounded and concussed. For his "courage and bravery," Grendal was decorated nine times and reached the rank of polkovnik (colonel) by 1917.

Siding with the Bolsheviks during the Russian Civil War, Grendal was appointed inspector of artillery of the Southern Front in October 1918. In January 1920 he transferred to serve as inspector of artillery of the Southwestern Front. Despite being with the front headquarters, Grendal participated in fighting with the troops of the 8th and 14th Armies. During the battles for the Kakhovka bridgehead, Grendal directed the artillery of the Southwestern Front, "skillfully concentrating fire on the main direction" and using it to defeat the tanks, armored vehicles, and armored trains of the Army of Wrangel. For his performance, he was awarded the Order of the Red Banner and a gold cigarette case.

== Interwar period ==
After the end of the Russian Civil War, Grendal was appointed chief of artillery of the Kiev Military District, later serving in the same capacity with the Petrograd Military District. Subsequently, Grendal headed the Red Army Artillery Academy (the renamed Mikhailovskaya Artillery Academy) and simultaneously was a member of the Higher Academic Military-Pedagogical Council of the Revolutionary Military Soviet. He oversaw the reform the artillery academy, including the creation of new departments developed new training programs, and strengthened the links between the academy and the troops. In 1925, Grendal was appointed deputy inspector, and in may of the same year inspected of the artillery of the Red Army. In this position he devoted much attention to artillery training, writing manuals for artillery bombardments and participating in inspections and maneuvers. Under his leadership, the artillery inspectorate crafted and disseminated guidelines for artillery employment based on combat experience.

Grendal coauthored the Field Regulations for Artillery Command and Staff with I. S. Brzhevsky in 1927. Under Grendal's leadership, a combat charter of artillery and instructions on its usage were developed. He wrote a series of articles on the employment of artillery and in 1926 published his theory of artillery employment as Artillery Fire.

Grendal served as deputy head of the directorate for military instruments in the Main Artillery Directorate between 1932 and 1935. In March 1935 he was sent to the Frunze Military Academy for educational work, serving as a lecturer and instructor there. He wrote many textbooks and lecture notes on artillery and began working on the creation of a work on artillery in the main types of battle. Appointed deputy head of the Main Artillery Directorate in January 1938, Grendal chaired its Artillery Committee, directing the future development of artillery in the Red Army. For his "productive research work," Grendal was awarded the Order of the Red Star.

== Winter War and death ==
During the Winter War, Grendal initially served as the representative of the Main Artillery Directorate, then commanded an operational group of two rifle divisions that together with reinforcements formed the 13th Army. For his performance in the breakthrough of the Mannerheim Line, Grendal was awarded the Order of Lenin. Ten days before the end of the war, on 3 March, Grendal was demoted to command the artillery of the Northwestern Front due to the slow pace of the army's advance and replaced by Filipp Parusinov. After the end of the war, Grendal returned to the Main Artillery Directorate. Reflecting combat experience, Grendal completed the editing of his work Artillery in the Main Types of Battle, published in 1940, the last of his over 300 works on artillery science. He died of cancer on 16 November 1940 and was buried in the Novodevichy Cemetery.

== Personal life ==
In 1919, Grendal's wife, daughter and son left Estonia for Helsinki, Finland, and he never saw them again. During the Winter War, his son Boris served in the Finnish forces, placing father and son on opposing sides of the conflict. Soviet radio broadcasts drew attention to this circumstance, addressing Boris with the message: "Boris, Boris, you are fighting against your father."

== Awards and honors ==
- (Russian Empire) :
  - Order of Saint Stanislaus, 3rd class (6 December 1914)
  - Order of Saint Vladimir, 4th class with swords and bow
- (Soviet Union) :
  - Order of Lenin (21 March 1940)
  - Order of the Red Banner (1921)
  - Order of the Red Star (22 February 1938)
