= Pravdino, Vyborgsky District =

Rural locality in Vyborgsky District, Russia

Coordinates: 60°33′N 29°34′E

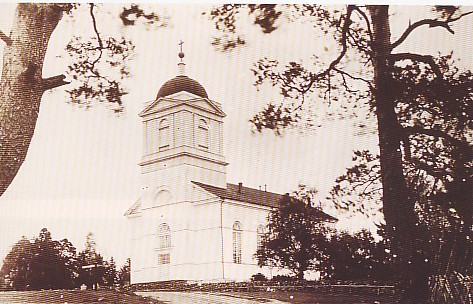
Muolaa Lutheran church. Built in 1849, destroyed during the Second World War

Pravdino (Russian: Пра́вдино; Finnish: Kirkkoranta or Muolaa) is a settlement located on the Karelian Isthmus, in the Vyborgsky District of Leningrad Oblast. Prior to the Winter War and the Continuation War, it served as the administrative center of the Muolaa municipality in the Viipuri Province of Finland.

Before the Winter War, Muolaa was divided into two separate municipalities, Äyräpää and Muolaa.

In Pravdino, there was once the State demesne and manor of Målagård, the place of origin and seat from 1606 to 1704 for the Swedish noble family Hästesko af Målagård, who were ennobled in 1602. It is unknown whether anything remains of Målagård today. The noble family Hästesko af Målagård continues to exist only in France.
