= 153rd Rifle Division =

Soviet military unit

The 153rd Rifle Division was a infantry division of the Red Army of the Soviet Union during World War II.

- First formation, 153rd Rifle Division (1940–1941). It was formed at Sverdlovsk in the Ural Military District. On 22 June 1941 when the German Operation Barbarossa began, it was serving under command of Nikolai Gagen with the 51st Rifle Corps of the 22nd Army.
- Second formation, 153rd Rifle Division (1942)
- Third formation, 153rd Rifle Division (1943-1946)
