= Battle of Vyborg (disambiguation) =

Battle of Vyborg may refer to:

- Battle of Vyborg, battle of the Finnish Civil War.
- Battle of Vyborg Bay (1790), naval battle of the Russo-Swedish War
- Battle of Vyborg Bay (1940), last battle of the Winter War.
- Battle of Vyborg (1941), battle of World War II : Finns retake the city.
- Battle of Vyborg Bay (1944), battle of World War II : Soviets approach the city.
