= Karl Lennart Oesch =

Finnish WWII general (1892–1978)

Lennart Oesch
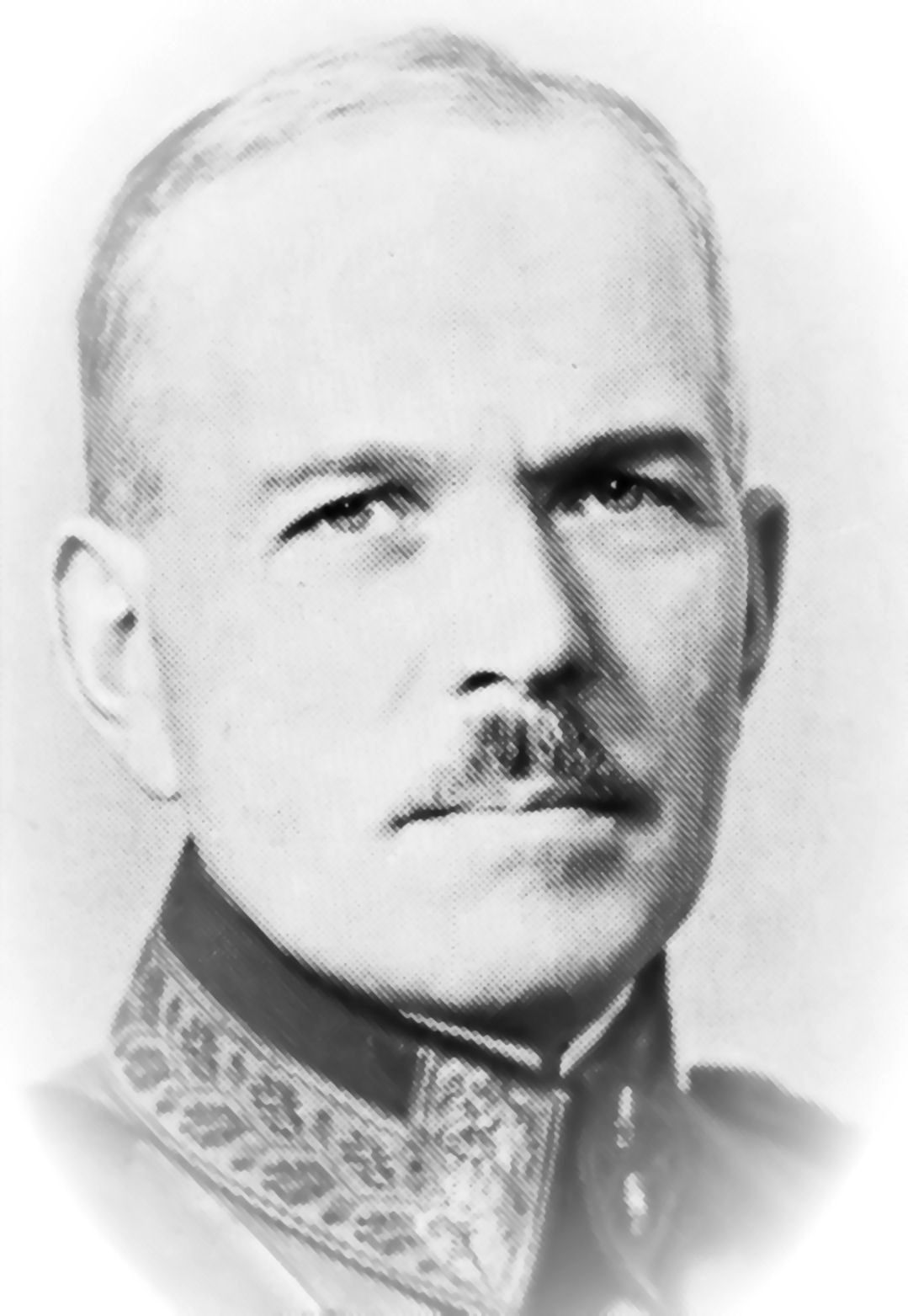
- Lennart Oesch in 1918
- Born: 8 August 1892; Pyhäjärvi, Grand Duchy of Finland
- Died: 28 March 1978 (aged 85); Helsinki, Finland
- Burial place: Hietaniemi Cemetery
- Military career
- Allegiance: German Empire (1915–1918); Finland (1918–1945)
- Branch: Imperial German Army; Finnish Jäger troops; Finnish Army
- Service years: 1915–1945
- Rank: Oberzugführer (Germany); Lieutenant general (Finland)
- Commands: II Corps; IV Corps; Olonets Group; III, IV, and V Corps as Commander of the Isthmus Forces
- Conflicts: World War I; Finnish Civil War; Battle of Rautu; World War II; Winter War; Battle of Vyborg Bay (1940); Continuation War; Battle of Vyborg (1941); Battle of Porlampi; Vyborg–Petrozavodsk Offensive; Battle of Tali–Ihantala
- Awards: Mannerheim Cross; Grand Cross of the Order of the Cross of Liberty; Order of the White Rose of Finland; Order of the Three Stars; Order of St. Olav; Order of Polonia Restituta; Golden Cross of Merit; Legion of Honour; Order of the Sword; Order of the Polar Star; Several German and Prussian Iron Crosses; Order of the Dannebrog; Order of the Cross of the Eagle
- Other work: Writings of Military History

Karl Lennart Oesch (8 August 1892 – 28 March 1978) was one of Finland's leading generals during World War II. He served as Chief of the General Staff of the Finnish Defence Forces from 1930 to 1940 and again in 1944, and commanded major operations during both the Winter War and the Continuation War. At the end of the Continuation War he commanded three Finnish army corps on the Karelian Isthmus during the decisive defensive battles of summer 1944, for which he received the Mannerheim Cross. After the war, he was tried and convicted for war crimes relating to the treatment of Soviet prisoners of war.

== Early life ==
Karl Lennart Oesch was born on 8 August 1892 in Pyhäjärvi to Christian Oesch and Anna Barbara Stegman. His father had moved to Finland from Switzerland before his birth and worked as a cheesemaker, developing the dairy industry in Karelia as an independent entrepreneur. Lennart was the youngest of six sons in a family of nine children. He attended school in Sortavala and studied in the Department of Mathematics and Physics at the University of Helsinki from 1911 to 1915.

== Jäger Movement and Civil War ==
Oesch joined the Finnish Jäger Movement, traveling to Germany in February 1915 with the first volunteer contingent. According to Mikko Uola, the decision was at least partly influenced by his father, who detested all forms of state oppression and encouraged his son to leave. As a member of the Royal Prussian 27th Jäger Battalion, he fought on the German side of World War I on the Eastern Front, participating in combat in the region of Misa. He briefly returned to Finland to recruit more volunteers, before returning to Germany. In 1917, he was promoted Oberzugführer (English: Senior platoon leader).

He returned to Finland in February 1918 with the main forces of the Finnish Jägers to take part in the Finnish Civil War on the side of the Finnish Whites. During the civil war, Oesch commanded the 8th Jäger Battalion in the regions of Raasuli and Rautu.

Oesch's battalion saw action especially in the area of the Rautu railway station, which was held by the Finnish Reds who were supported by an armored train. The reds withdrew from the station following multiple White attacks which captured the armored train but failed to capture the station area. Oesch reported that the withdrawal resulted in significant casualties, with 1200 Reds killed and 600–800 captured. The 8th Jäger Battalion lost 199 men with 160 wounded while the total White losses were 670 men.

In 1918, Oesch was commissioned as a captain in the Finnish Army and soon after promoted to major. He briefly acted as the chief of staff of the Mountain Brigade (Finnish: Vuoristoprikaati) before taking the position of the chief of intelligence in the Finnish General Headquarters. Later that year, he took command of the Guards Jäger Battalion (Finnish: Kaartin jääkäripataljoona), a position he would hold until 1920.

== Interwar years ==
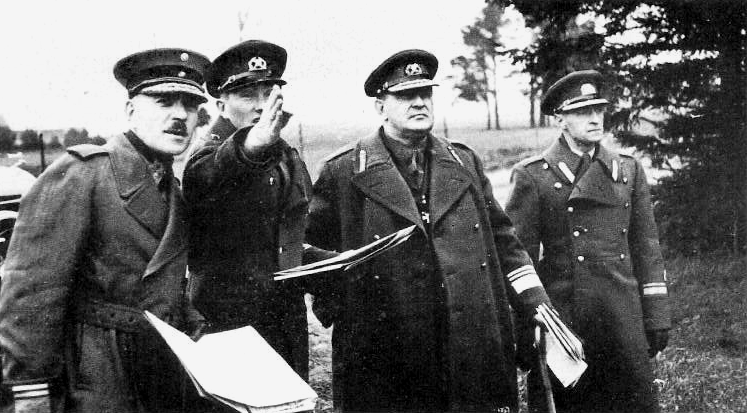
Lennart Oesch (left) monitors Estonian army military exercises in October 1938.

Oesch married Anna Aitanga Niskanen in 1919. The couple had two children: son Karl Christian (born 1921) and daughter Ann-Mari (born 1922).

In the 1920s and 1930s Oesch advanced rapidly in the Finnish Defence Forces. He briefly acted as an aide to the chief-of-staff of the Army High Command, before being given command of the Vyborg Regiment (Finnish: Viipurin Rykmentti). While holding that command, he was promoted lieutenant colonel in 1921.

From 1924 to 1926, Oesch studied in the French military academy. During this time, he was also promoted colonel. Once he had returned to Finland, Oesch commanded the newly created general staff academy Sotakorkeakoulu. He briefly held command of the 1st Division from 1929 to 1930, after which he was promoted to major general and appointed Chief of the General Staff. During the following years, he oversaw significant reforms in the Finnish armed forces, which, according to Mikko Uola, "made possible the successes of the Finnish army in the Winter War". He was promoted to lieutenant general in 1936.

Oesch also served briefly as Deputy Minister of the Interior Affairs from 3 to 14 March 1932, during the crisis caused by the Mäntsälä rebellion. During the same period he worked in the President's staff, where he pursued a mediating line between the Commander of the Defence Forces Aarne Sihvo, who categorically opposed the rebels, and the head of the Civil Guard Lauri Malmberg, who was largely sympathetic to the Mäntsälä men.

== Winter War and the Interim Peace ==
When the Soviet invasion of Finland started the Winter War on 30 November 1939, Oesch continued as Chief of the General Staff at Finnish Supreme headquarters under the Finnish Commander-in-Chief, Marshal Carl Gustaf Emil Mannerheim.

In early March 1940, just prior to the end of the Winter War, Oesch was given command of the Coast Group, whose sector along the Bay of Vyborg had become critical. Oesch replaced Major General Kurt Martti Wallenius, who had taken command only three days prior. According to Robert Edwards, Wallenius had "retreated to his command post and became very drunk" after losing his nerve from the intensity of the combat. The Battle of Vyborg Bay saw both sides suffer significant losses, but by the evening of March 5 the Soviet 173rd Motor Rifle Division had established a bridgehead over the bay. Further Soviet forces arrived at the bridgehead by 10 March, but the signing of the Moscow Peace Treaty on 12 March saw the hostilities end at 11 a.m. on 13 March.

Following the end of the war, Oesch first returned to his previous post as the Chief of the General Staff for a few weeks, before taking the command of II Corps.

== Continuation War ==
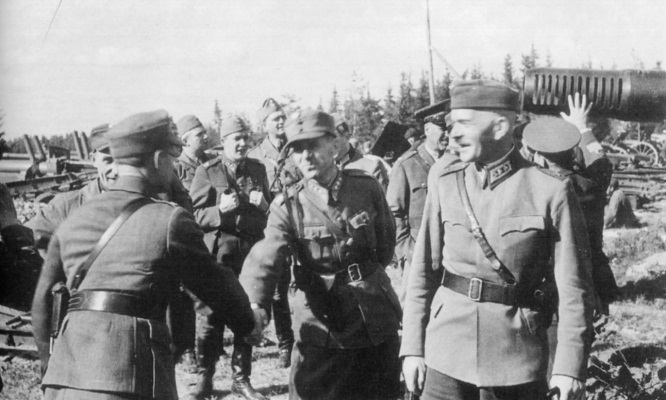
Oesch in Vyborg in 1941.

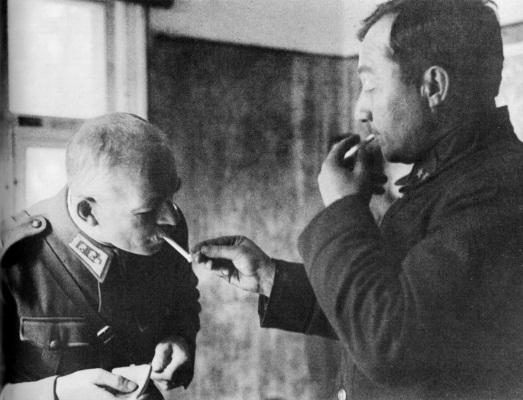
Soviet division commander General Vladimir Kirpichnikov, a prisoner of war, lights a cigarette for Oesch in 1941.

Following Finno-German negotiations that had been ongoing from at least May 1941, the Finns mobilized on 10 June 1941 in preparation for the Continuation War, the Finnish component of the German invasion of the Soviet Union. As part of these preparations, Oesch's II Corps was renamed IV Corps. Consisting of the 4th, 8th, 10th and 12th divisions, it was initially tasked with the defense of the southernmost sector of the Finno-Soviet border on the shore of the Gulf of Finland.

Following the Soviet 23rd Army's withdrawal from Vyborg, parts of IV Corps followed in pursuit. A Finnish amphibious landing to Lokhaniemi, south of Vyborg, together with a by-land envelopment conducted by the 4th and 12th divisions, resulted in the pocketing of the Soviet 43rd, 115th and 123rd divisions following the Battle of Porlampi. While most of the 115th and 123rd divisions eventually escaped the encirclement, the operation resulted in the capture of some 3000 prisoners of war, including the commander of the Soviet 43rd Division, Major General Kirpichnikov, and large amounts of materiel.

In 1942, Oesch was given command of Olonets Group in the Olonets Isthmus between Lakes Onega and Ladoga. While the front had stabilized into trench warfare, Oesch's forces soon came under attack by six soviet divisions and four brigades. The attack was eventually repulsed, but caused significant casualties for both sides.

The trench warfare period ended on 9 June 1944 with the Soviet Vyborg–Petrozavodsk Offensive, which soon broke the Finnish lines. On the morning of 14 June 1944, Oesch received a call from Lieutenant General Aksel Airo with the following message:

Everything's going to hell on the Isthmus. Get yourself there on orders from the commander-in-chief, the corps are yours.

Oesch was given the title Commander of the Isthmus Forces, with the forces under his command soon including the III, IV and V Corps. The Soviet offensive pushed the Finnish forces first to the VT-line, and eventually to the VKT-line, where the situation eventually stabilized around 17 July, following the fall of Vyborg and the battles of Tali-Ihantala and Vyborg Bay. Oesch was awarded the Mannerheim Cross on 26 June 1944. The citation highlighted three operations he had led successfully during the war: the command of forces on the western Karelian Isthmus during the 1941 offensive, including the recapture of Vyborg; the repulsion of the Soviet spring offensive at the Svir in 1942; and the defence of the Karelian Isthmus in June 1944.

Following the stabilization of the situation, Soviet forces from the Finnish front were redirected to other fronts, and on 27 July the Soviets indicated they would be open to a negotiated peace that allowed for an independent Finland. The Finnish parliament accepted the Soviet demands on 2 September. As agreed during the negotiations, Finnish forces began to observe a cease-fire at 07:00 a.m. on 4 September. Soviet forces followed suit some 25 hours later, at 08:00 a.m. on 5 September.

After the end of the war, Oesch briefly commanded the General Staff of the Finnish General Headquarters before taking command of an army corps later that year.

== Trial for war crimes ==
In November 1941, Oesch had given an order to shoot political commissars and other prisoners of war who refused to work or follow orders. Paperwork relating to such executions was not to be properly filled in; the executed were instead listed as "removed" (Finnish: poistettu). In the autumn of 1944, Oesch also ordered the destruction of documents relating to shot prisoners of war.

Oesch was arrested for war crimes in 1945 on the initiative of Justice Minister Urho Kekkonen, and spent several months in pre-trial detention. In 1946, he was sentenced to twelve years in prison on involuntary manslaughter charges for having encouraged the killings of 17 Soviet prisoners of war. The sentence was later reduced to three years by the Supreme Court of Finland.

== Later life ==
After Oesch was released from prison in 1948, he devoted himself to military history, researching and writing extensively on Finnish experiences in World War II. He founded the Kansa Taisteli magazine and wrote a book on the 1944 events on the Karelian Isthmus. According to Mikko Uola, Oesch was embittered by what he perceived as a lack of recognition for his actions; in particular, President Kekkonen's attitude towards the Jäger generals, and especially towards Oesch, is described as wholly negative.

Oesch died in Helsinki on 28 March 1978 and is buried in the Hietaniemi cemetery.

== Awards ==
National

- Republic of Finland:
  - Grand Cross with Swords of the Order of the Cross of Liberty (1944)
  - Knight of the Mannerheim Cross, 2nd class, of the Order of the Cross of Liberty (1944)
  - Commander 1st Class of the Order of the White Rose of Finland

Foreign

- Kingdom of Denmark: Commander 1st Class of the Order of the Dannebrog
- Republic of Estonia: 1st Class of the Order of the Cross of the Eagle
- (France) French Republic: Commander of the Legion of Honour
- Germany:
  - (Germany) German Empire: Iron Cross 2nd Class
  - Nazi Germany: Iron Cross 1st Class
- Republic of Latvia: Grand Cross of the Order of the Three Stars
- Kingdom of Norway: Commander with Star of the Order of St. Olav
- (Poland) Polish Republic:
  - Grand Cross of the Order of Polonia Restituta
  - Commander of the Golden Cross of Merit
- Kingdom of Sweden:
  - Commander 1st Class of the Order of the Sword
  - Commander 1st Class of the Order of the Polar Star

In 1960, he was given an honorary doctorate by the University of Turku.
