= Vladimir Kirpichnikov (general) =

Soviet general and criminal

Vladimir Vasilevich Kirpichnikov
- Born: 7 July 1903; Simbirsk, Simbirsk Governorate, Russian Empire
- Died: 10 October 1950 (aged 47); Moscow, Soviet Union
- Military career
- Allegiance: Soviet Union
- Service years: 1922–1941
- Rank: Major general
- Unit: Infantry
- Commands: 43rd Rifle Division
- Conflicts: Spanish Civil War; World War II; Winter War; Battle of Vyborg Bay; Continuation War; Battle of Vyborg; Battle of Porlampi
- Awards: Order of the Red Star; Order of the Red Banner

Vladimir Vasilevich Kirpichnikov (Russian: Владимир Васильевич Кирпичников; 7 July 1903 – 10 October 1950) was a Soviet general of the Red Army. During World War II he served as commander of 43rd Rifle Division. Kirpichnikov was the only Soviet general captured by the Finnish Army. In 1950, he was convicted of treason and shot.

== Early career ==
After graduating from school, in 1915 Kirpichnikov worked in a printing house in Simbirsk, and from May 1916, as an apprentice telegraph operator on the Moscow-Kazan Railway. In February 1917, he began work as a trader in a cooperative in Simbirsk. From 1920 he studied at rabfak, and from September 1921 he worked at the Simbirsk Cartridge Plant.

Kirpichnikov served in the Red Army from 1922, entering the Lenin Ulyanovsk Red Banner Infantry School, which he graduated in 1925. In 1925, he began service as a platoon leader and later as a major and a colonel in the 11th Rifle Division of the Leningrad Military District. In December 1931, he began service in the 4th Turkestan Rifle Division of the Leningrad Military District (Kingisepp), where he commanded the rifle and training battalions of the 12th Turkestan Rifle Regiment. In May 1937, he began service as chief of staff of the regiment.

From June 1937 to June 1938, Kirpichnikov served as chief of staff in the Spanish Civil War and was awarded the Order of the Red Star. Upon his return in July 1938, he was appointed assistant commander of the 36th Rifle Division.

In 23 August 1939, Kirpichnikov was named commander of the 43rd Rifle Division – it was in this position that Kirpichnikov, now a colonel, participated in the Winter War as part of the 7th Army. At the final stage of the war, Kirpichnikov's division crossed the Vyborg Bay and captured the islands of Suonionsaari and Ravansaari. For his service in the Winter War, Kirpichnikov was awarded with the Order of the Red Banner.

In May 1941, Kirpichnikov graduated from the Frunze Military Academy.

== World War II ==
In the Eastern Front, Kirpichnikov continued to command the 43rd Rifle Division, which was part of the 23rd Army of the Northern Front (from 23 August 1941, Leningrad Front). The division took part in the defensive operation in Karelia (Vyborg-Kexholm frontal defensive operation), defending along the Soviet-Finnish border from the beginning of the war. On 23 August, the Finnish South-Eastern Army went on the offensive in the Vyborg direction, and already on 26 August, the 43rd Infantry Division and a number of other units were surrounded in during the Battle of Porlampi.

== Captivity ==
Having lost control of the troops, Kirpichnikov was shell-shocked and, while trying to leave the encirclement with a small group of soldiers in an unconscious state (as he claimed during interrogations after returning to the Soviet Union), he was captured on 1 September 1941, near the village of Porlampi. He was first interrogated in the village of Karisalmi and later moved to Finnish Army headquarters in Mikkeli. From the interrogations, the Finns concluded that their data on the concentration and transfer of Red Army forces was basically correct, but due to the Red Army's retreat, the information received from Kirpichnikov had already lost its relevance and had no practical significance.

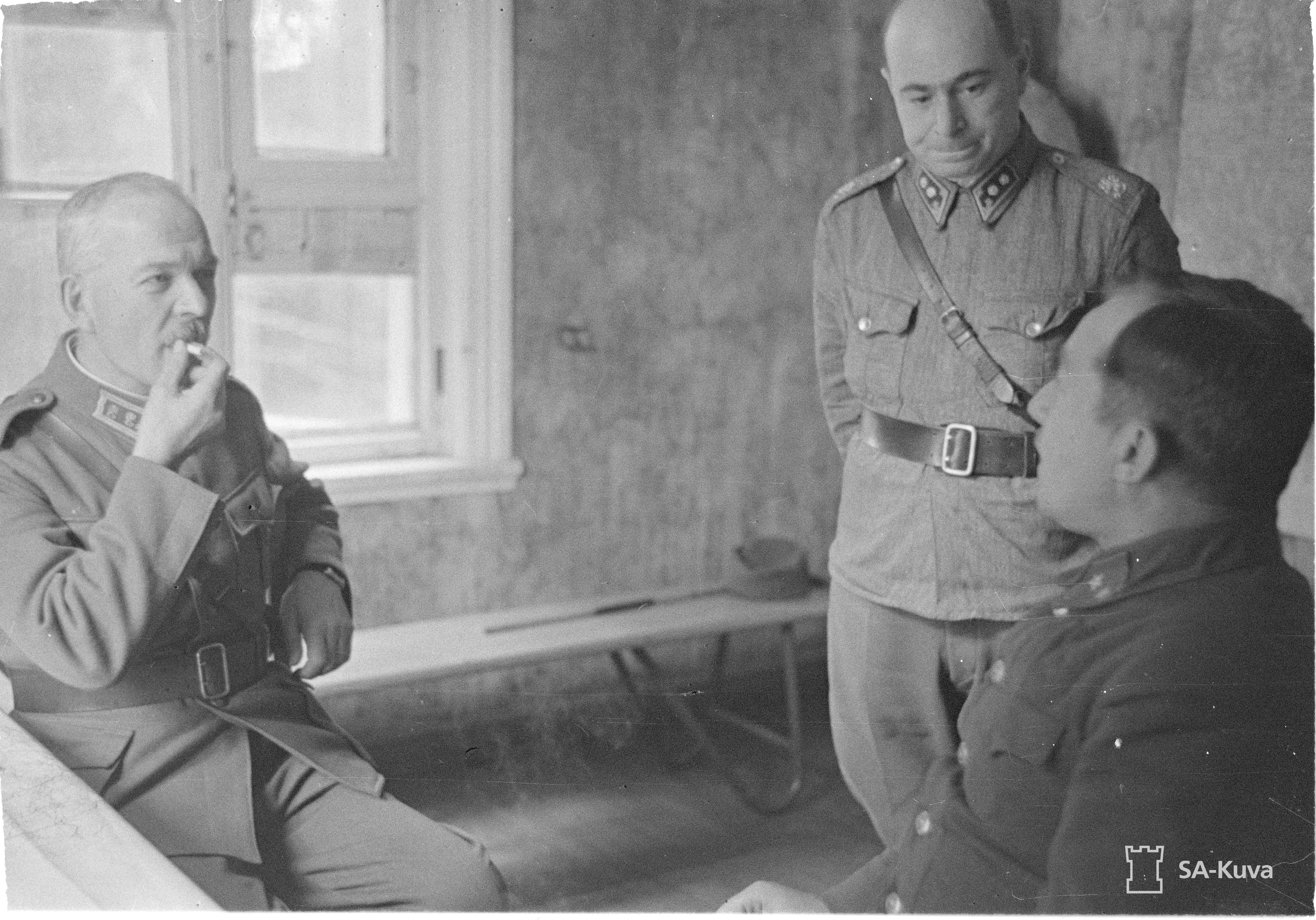
Kirpichnikov questioned by Finnish General Lennart Oesch.

There were repeated attempts to convince Kirpichnikov to cooperate with Finland and promote their propaganda. Though Kirpichnikov did not agree to work for Finland, he wrote several notes about the possibility of a coup in the Soviet Union, the popularity of the White movement among the population of the USSR, the war of the USSR with Germany and its allies, the work of the NKVD, family and life in the Soviet Union, and a number of other topics.

Since Kirpichnikov was the only Soviet general captured by Finland, the Finnish command most actively used this fact in propaganda. His captivity was widely covered in the press and dozens of photographs of him in captivity were published, most famous being a picture of Kirpichnikov lighting the cigarette of his interrogator, General Lennart Oesch, and a color photo of Kirpichnikov with a newspaper and a pack of Chesterfield cigarettes. He was seen in the Finnish propaganda newsreel Puolustusvoimain katsaus 11 in 1941. A special documentary was created about his captivity, which was shown both in cinemas and to Soviet prisoners of war.

According to other prisoners, Kirpichnikov was offered the commander's post of the Russian Liberation Army but he refused. In December 1941, he was moved to Sotavankileiri 1 (Prison camp 1), which was located in the municipality of Köyliö in Western Finland. It was a camp for more than 3,000 Soviet prisoners, including 1,000 officers, who were kept in conditions of strict isolation. When a truce was signed between Finland and the USSR in September 1944 (one of the conditions of which was the mutual return of prisoners of war from both armies), Kirpichnikov's captors repeatedly suggested that he refuse to return to the USSR and either stay in Finland or go to Sweden or the USA. Kirpichnikov refused these proposals.

== After captivity ==
On 20 September 1944, Kirpichnikov was transferred to Soviet command. He was verified at the Podolsk inspection and filtration camp, where he was checked by employees of the 2nd department of the Main Directorate of Counterintelligence (GUKR) "SMERSH".

By mid-May 1945, Kirpichnikov was verified. The investigation accused him of "giving the Finns information about the concentration of Red Army units in the Vyborg direction and other secret information about Soviet troops during interrogations" and "providing the Finnish command with a report in which he described in detail the military operations of the 43rd Rifle Division, slandered the Soviet system and the organization of the Red Army, and praised the Finnish army." However, the MGB SSSO noted that "Kirpichnikov allegedly refused the offer of the Finnish authorities to lead the anti-Soviet movement among the prisoners of war of the Red Army in Finnish captivity, as a result of which he was imprisoned in a camp by the Finns, where he was kept until Finland left the war."

Based on the results of the inspection on 16 May 1945, the head of SMERSH, Viktor Abakumov, approved Kirpichnikov's arrest, which was authorized by the deputy chief military prosecutor of the Red Army on 18 May 1945. Kirpichnikov was transferred from the camp to Lefortovo Prison in Moscow, where he was kept until May 1948; from there, he was transferred to the Sukhanovo Prison.

On 5 July 1945, Kirpichnikov was charged under Article 58-1 "b" of the Criminal Code of the RSFSR (treason committed by a military serviceman). He pleaded guilty to giving the Finns some secret information and writing a report criticizing the Soviet command and the Red Army and praising the German and Finnish armies, but rejected accusations of voluntary surrender and collaboration with the enemy while in captivity. On 2 August 1950, he was finally charged.

The case was considered on 28 August 1950 at a closed court hearing of the Military Collegium of the Supreme Court of the Soviet Union without the participation of the prosecution, defense, and witnesses. At this hearing, Kirpichnikov was found guilty, convicted on the charges brought by the investigation, and sentenced to capital punishment – execution with confiscation of property. The sentence was carried out immediately. According to the court verdict, he was also deprived of state awards and military rank.

== Attempts at rehabilitation ==
Kirpichnikov's widow was informed in 1954 that Kirpichnikov, while serving his sentence, died of stomach cancer on 12 December 1951. Not believing this information, on 23 April 1963, she sent a statement to the Central Committee of the CPSU, in which she asked for his rehabilitation, clarification of the causes of death, and the issuance of a "truthful death certificate." On 20 June 1963, the Main Military Prosecutor's Office began a review of Kirpichnikov's case, during which specialists from the Military Scientific Directorate of the General Staff of the USSR Armed Forces were involved and an examination of the information reported by Kirpichnikov to the enemy was carried out.

The examination came to the conclusion that "the information he conveyed to the Finns in captivity about the actions of the 43rd Rifle Division in defense was far from being communicated to the Finns in full, and, moreover, in hindsight and by the time of Kirpichnikov's interrogation, they had lost their relevance, and therefore their practical significance," and therefore could no longer be used when planning military operations against Soviet troops. This proved that there was no treason in the form of going over to the side of the enemy, but Kirpichnikov's written report to the Finnish command dated 3 September 1941 contained information that constituted military and state secrets. On this basis, in January 1964, rehabilitation was denied, and the prosecution of General Kirpichnikov under Article 58-1 "b" of the Criminal Code of the Russian SFSR was considered justified.

On 5 June 1990, the criminal case against Kirpichnikov was re-examined by the Main Military Prosecutor's Office; no grounds were found for filing a protest against the verdict of the Military Collegium of the Supreme Court of the USSR of 28 August 1950. On 26 April 2002, the Main Military Prosecutor's Office refused to rehabilitate the archival case against Kirpichnikov, since his guilt of treason in the form of betraying military secrets to the enemy was established.

== Awards and decorations ==
Soviet Union

Order of the Red Banner (15 January 1940)
Order of the Red Star (14 November 1938)
Jubilee Medal "XX Years of the Workers' and Peasants' Red Army" (22 February 1938)

== Gallery ==
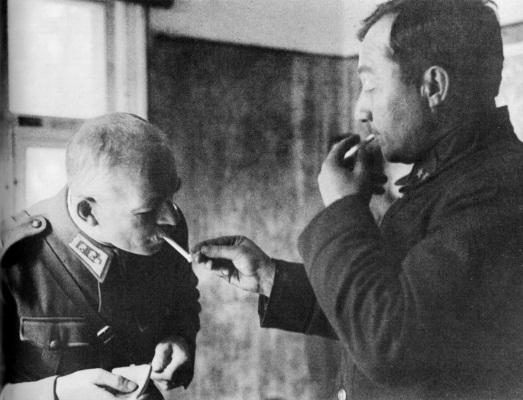
Kirpichnikov lighting the cigarette of Karl Lennart Oesch

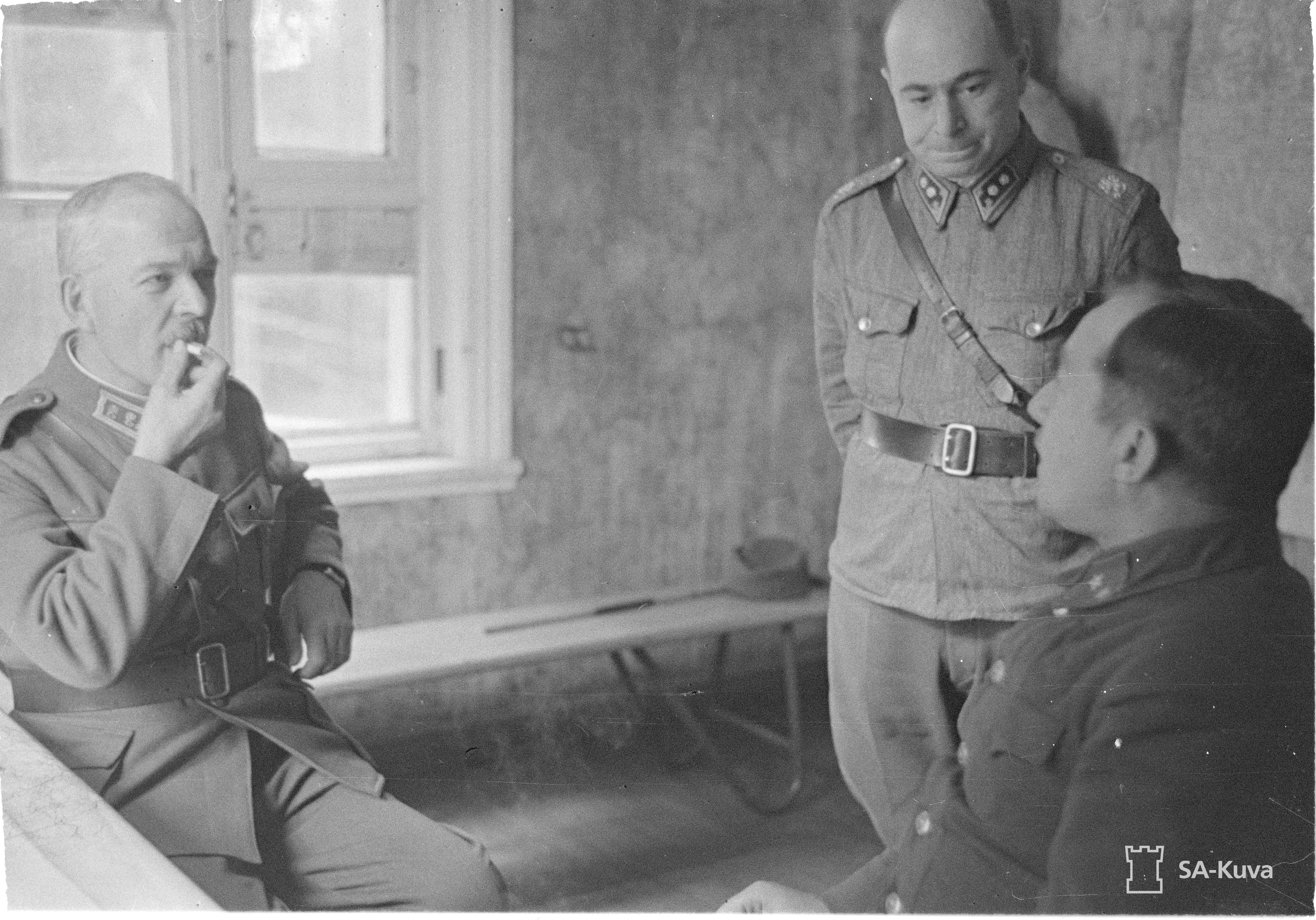
Kirpichnikov conversing with Oesch, with Lt. Georg Baronin as an interpreter
