= 279th Rifle Division =

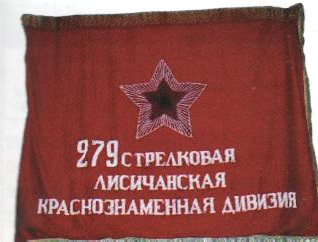
- Battle flag of the 279th Rifle Division (2nd formation)
- Active: 1st formation: July–November 1941; 2nd formation: June 1942 – May 1946
- Country: Soviet Union
- Branch: Red Army
- Type: Rifle division
- Engagements: World War II
- Decorations: Order of the Red Banner (2nd formation)
- Battle honours: Lysychansk (2nd formation)

The 279th Rifle Division (Russian: 279-я стрелковая дивизия) was an infantry division of the Soviet Union's Red Army during World War II, formed twice.

The division was first formed in the summer of 1941 and was in the Bryansk pocket. The division was reformed in June 1942 and served until the end of the war. Post-war, it was converted into a rifle brigade, which became the 473rd District Training Center after several redesignations.

== History ==
=== First Formation ===
The 279th was formed from the 6th Reserve Rifle Brigade in the cities of Vladimir and Gorky beginning on 2 July 1941, part of the Moscow Military District. The division's basic order of battle included the 1001st, 1003rd, and the 1005th Rifle Regiments, as well as the 831st Artillery Regiment and the 378th Separate Reconnaissance Battalion. On 5 August, the 279th became part of the Reserve Front's 24th Army, with headquarters at Putykova. On 10 August the division transferred to the 43rd Army, but five days later became part of the 50th Army. At the end of September, just before the start of Operation Typhoon, the German attack on Moscow, the 279th had a strength of 7,964 men, 317 machine guns, 89 artillery pieces, 6 anti-aircraft guns, and 15 anti-tank guns. The division was surrounded and destroyed in the Bryansk pocket, created by the German breakthrough. By 1 November the only remaining unit of the division was the 1005th Rifle Regiment, which became a separate unit directly under the Bryansk Front. On 15 November the division was officially disbanded, and its remnants used to reinforce the 154th Rifle Division.

=== Second Formation ===
The division began its second formation on 2 June 1942 at Balakhna, formed from troops called up from the Urals and Central Asia and a rifle brigade, and commanded by Colonel Gerasim Mukhin. The 279th was immediately assigned to the 9th Reserve Army in the Reserve of the Supreme High Command. In August it became part of the 43rd Army, which in September became part of the Kalinin Front. At the end of the year, the division transferred to the Reserve of the Supreme High Command and moved south, becoming part of the Southwestern Front's 3rd Guards Army by the end of January 1943. In April the 279th became part of the 32nd Rifle Corps. The division transferred back to the Reserve of the Supreme High Command in January 1944 and became part of the 51st Army of the 4th Ukrainian Front. The division fought in the Crimean Offensive during April and May as part of the 10th and the 1st Guards Rifle Corps, during which it helped recapture Simferopol and on 24 April received the Order of the Red Banner. On 7 May the division and the rest of the army participated in the assault on Sevastopol, which was captured two days later. The remaining Axis troops soon evacuated from Crimea, enabling the 51st Army's transfer to the Baltic states in May after briefly moving into the RVGK.

By 1 July 1944, the army was part of the 1st Baltic Front, and in August the division transferred to the 10th Rifle Corps. From late 1944, the 51st Army blockaded German troops trapped in the Courland Pocket, where the 279th ended the war in May 1945. On 17 August 1945, the 279th was transferred to the Elansky military camp in Kamyshlov in the Ural Military District, where it became the 23rd Separate Rifle Brigade in May 1946. On 12 September 1953, the brigade was converted into the 61st Mechanized Division. On 25 April 1957, the 61st became the 44th Tank Division, which became a training unit, the 44th Tank Training Division, in 1960. The division later became the 473rd District Training Center.
