= Battle of Vyborg Bay =

Battle of Vyborg Bay can refer to three battles:

- Battle of Vyborg Bay (1790), between Russia and Sweden during the Russo-Swedish War (1788–90)
- Battle of Vyborg (1918), when Vyborg was captured by the Whites from the Reds during the Finnish Civil War
- Battle of Vyborg Bay (1940)
- Battle of Vyborg Bay (1944), between the Soviet Union and Finland during World War II
