= 473rd District Training Centre =

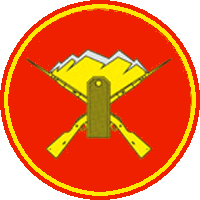
- Active: 1989–present
- Country: Soviet Union; Russia
- Branch: Soviet Army; Russian Ground Forces
- Type: District Training Centre
- Role: Training junior specialists for the motor rifle troops
- Part of: Central Military District
- Garrison/HQ: Yelansky
- Decorations: Order of the Red Banner
- Battle honours: Lysychansk

The 473rd District Training Centre (Military Unit Number 31612) is a training centre of the Russian Ground Forces. It is located at Yelansky, just west of Kamyshlov in Sverdlovsk Oblast in the Central Military District.

It was formed from the 279th Rifle Division (2nd Formation). In May 1946 the 279th Rifle Division became the 23rd Independent Rifle Brigade, and on 12 September 1953 the 61st Mechanised Division. The 44th Tank Division was formed from the 61st Mechanised Division in June 1957, and became a tank training division in 1962. Originally in the Ural Military District.

In 1989 it became the 473rd District Training Centre.

In 2004, after a merge with the 469th District Training Centre (the former 43rd Training Motor Rifle Division), it became the 473rd Lysychansk Red Banner District Training Centre. In 2010, it became part of the Central Military District.
