= Alkino, Chishminsky District, Republic of Bashkortostan =

Alkino Алкино
- Village
- Location within Bashkortostan Location within Russia
- Coordinates: 54°38′N 55°33′E
- Country: Russia
- Region: Bashkortostan
- District: Chishminsky District
- Time zone: UTC+5:00

Alkino (Russian: Алкино; Bashkir: Алкин, Alkin) is a rural locality (a village) in Alkinsky Selsoviet, Chishminsky District, Bashkortostan, Russia. The village has 20 streets and, as of 2010, a population of 261.

== Geography ==
Alkino is located 23 km northeast of Chishmy, the district's administrative centre. Uzytamak is the nearest rural locality.
