= Yury Grekov =

Russian army officer (1943–2024)

- Юрий Павлович Греков
- Born: Yury Pavlovich Grekov; 13 September 1943; Kulotino, Okulovsky District, Leningrad Oblast, Russian SFSR, USSR
- Died: 18 April 2024 (aged 80); Yekaterinburg, Russia
- Military career
- Allegiance: Soviet Union; Russia
- Branch: Russian Ground Forces
- Service years: 1962–2000
- Rank: Colonel general
- Commands: Ural Military District
- Conflicts: Soviet–Afghan War; Nagorno-Karabakh conflict

Yury Pavlovich Grekov (Russian: Юрий Павлович Греков; 13 September 1943 – 18 April 2024) was an officer of the Soviet and later Russian Army who served as the commander of the Ural Military District from 1992 to 1999, reaching the rank of colonel general.

== Biography ==
Yury Grekov was born on 13 September 1943. He joined the Soviet Army in 1962, and graduated from the Leningrad Higher Combined Arms Command School named after S. M. Kirov in 1966. From 1966 to 1971, he served as a platoon commander and company commander in the Group of Soviet Forces in Germany.

Grekov graduated from the Military Academy named after M.V. Frunze in 1974. From 1974 to 1983 he moved through the posts of deputy regiment commander, chief of staff of the regiment, regiment commander, deputy division commander, division commander in the Trans-Baikal Military District. Grekov graduated from the Military Academy of the General Staff of the Armed Forces of the USSR named after K. E. Voroshilov in 1985. From 1985, he was chief of staff and first deputy army commander in the Leningrad Military District. In 1986, he was the chief of staff and first deputy commander of the 40th Army as part of a limited contingent of Soviet troops in Afghanistan during the Soviet-Afghan War. He actively participated in combat operations for two years.

In 1988, Grekov was the commander of the 11th Guards Army in the Baltic Military District. In 1989, he was the first deputy commander of the Transcaucasian Military District, and had participated in the localization of the Armenian-Azerbaijani armed conflict in Nagorno-Karabakh. On 7 July 1992, as the Volga-Ural Military District had been abolished, to form the new Ural Military District, Grekov was appointed the commander of the district on 16 July.

In December 1999, Grekov was replaced by Vyacheslav Tikhomirov. Since January 2000, he was in reserve, and had been an advisor to the Governor of Sverdlovsk Oblast.

== Personal life and death ==
Grekov lived in Yekaterinburg. He died on 18 April 2024, at the age of 80.
