= Vasily Sokolovsky =

Soviet general (1897–1968)

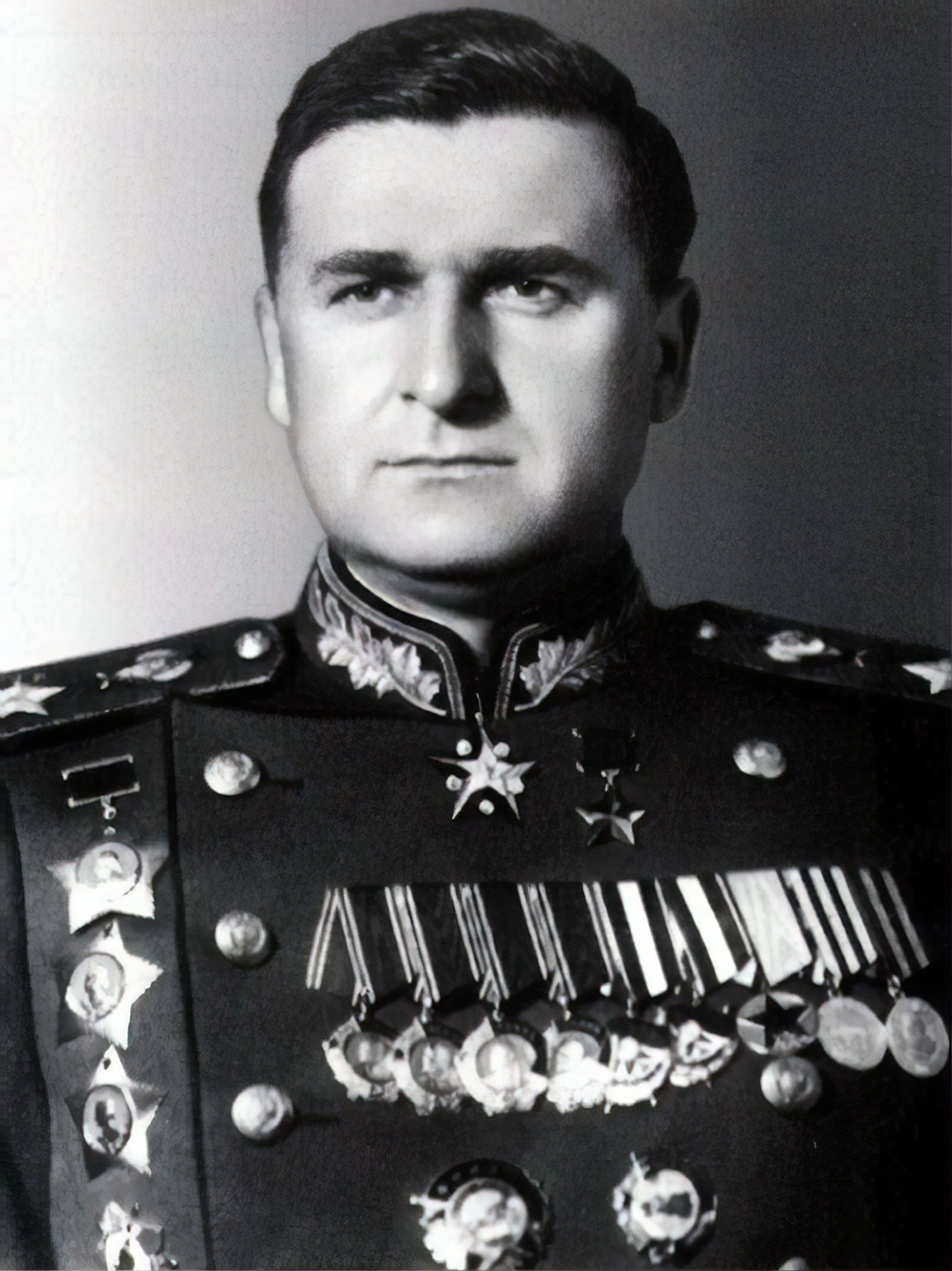
- Sokolovsky in 1946
- Born: July 21, 1897; Kozliki, Russian Empire
- Died: May 10, 1968 (aged 70); Moscow, Soviet Union
- Burial place: Kremlin Wall Necropolis, Moscow
- Military career
- Allegiance: Russian SFSR (1918–1922); Soviet Union (1922–1962)
- Branch: Red Army
- Service years: 1918–1962
- Rank: Marshal of the Soviet Union (1946–1962)
- Commands: 43rd Rifle Division; Western Front; Chief of the General Staff
- Conflicts: Russian Civil War; World War II; Battle of Moscow; Battle of Kursk; Operation Kutuzov; Battle of Smolensk; Orsha Offensives; Battle of Berlin
- Awards: Hero of the Soviet Union; Order of Lenin (8); Order of the Red Banner (2); Order of the October Revolution; Order of Suvorov, 1st Class (3); Order of Kutuzov, 1st Class (3)

Vasily Danilovich Sokolovsky (Russian: Василий Данилович Соколовский; 21 July 1897 – 10 May 1968) was a Soviet military commander and theorist who became a Marshal of the Soviet Union in 1946. During the Second World War, he served as chief of staff and then commander of the Western Front, chief of staff of the 1st Ukrainian Front, and deputy commander of the 1st Belorussian Front during the Battle of Berlin. He was made a Hero of the Soviet Union in 1945. After the war, he commanded the Soviet occupation forces in Germany and headed the Soviet Military Administration in Germany during the Berlin Blockade, and from 1952 to 1960 he was Chief of the General Staff of the Soviet Armed Forces. He led the team of authors of Military Strategy (1962), which drew a wide readership in the West.

== Early life ==
Sokolovsky was born on 21 July 1897 into a poor peasant family in the village of Kozliki in Grodno Governorate in the Russian Empire, which is now part of Poland. He was a Belarusian. After finishing a parish school in 1905, he worked as a day labourer at a tannery in Zabłudów, and he graduated with distinction from a two-class teachers' school in 1912. He then studied at the teachers' seminary in Nevel, from which he graduated in 1918.

== Military career ==
=== Russian Civil War ===
Sokolovsky volunteered for the Red Army in February 1918. In May 1918, he completed the first Moscow military instructors' course, and he was sent to the Eastern Front as a company commander. During the Russian Civil War, he fought on the Eastern, Southern and Caucasian fronts, serving as a company and regimental commander and in staff posts, and he briefly commanded cavalry divisions. From 6 to 16 October 1919, he commanded the 13th Siberian Cavalry Division. Between postings to the front, he studied at the Military Academy of the Red Army, and he graduated in 1921 among its three best students. In 1920, he served on the staff of the 32nd Rifle Division of the 11th Army in the North Caucasus, and he was its acting chief of staff from September of that year.

After graduating, Sokolovsky was posted to the Turkestan Front, where he served from October 1921 as assistant head of the operations directorate. In April 1922, he became chief of staff of the 2nd Turkestan Rifle Division and the Fergana Group of Forces, and in May 1924 he took command of both. He took part in the fighting against the Basmachi, and he was wounded by a bullet in one of the battles.

== Interwar period ==
From August 1924, Sokolovsky served as chief of staff of the 14th Rifle Division in the Moscow Military District, and from 1926 as chief of staff of a rifle corps. In 1928, he completed the higher academic courses at the Frunze Military Academy. He joined the Communist Party in 1931. From 1930 to 1935, he commanded the 43rd Rifle Division in the Belorussian Military District. He was chief of staff of the Ural Military District from May 1935 to April 1938, and then of the Moscow Military District until February 1941. In February 1941, he was appointed deputy chief of the General Staff of the Red Army.

=== Second World War ===
After the German invasion of the Soviet Union in June 1941, Sokolovsky briefly served as first deputy chief of the General Staff, and from July 1941 he was chief of staff of the Western Direction and of the Western Front. In that role, he took part in planning the Soviet counteroffensive in the Battle of Moscow in the winter of 1941–1942. From January to March 1942, he was again first deputy chief of the General Staff, and from May 1942 he was once more chief of staff of the Western Front.

In February 1943, Sokolovsky became commander of the Western Front, which he led until April 1944. In 1943, the front took part in the Rzhev–Vyazma, Orel and Smolensk offensives. From October 1943, the front carried out a series of offensives along the Moscow–Minsk highway towards Orsha and Vitebsk, which failed with heavy losses. General Makhmut Gareev put the Western Front's losses in eleven failed operations between October 1943 and April 1944 at 62,326 killed and missing and 219,419 wounded. According to the historians David and Mary Glantz, the front's five November offensives around Orsha gained only 6–12 kilometres (3.7–7.5 mi) at a cost of 94,200 casualties, including 25,500 killed.

A commission of the State Defense Committee investigated the Western Front's operations, and its report of 11 April 1944 criticised the front's command for complacency, for failing to analyse its mistakes and for the poor work of its artillery. Following the report, Sokolovsky was removed from command of the front in April 1944. The Glantzes blamed his unimaginative operations and detached style of command for the heavy losses, and argued that because of his later prominence, "Sokolovsky's reputation had to be, and was, preserved". General Alexander Pokrovsky, who served as chief of staff of the Western Front under him, described him to the writer Konstantin Simonov as exceptionally intelligent and widely educated, but said that as a front commander he conducted a series of costly unsuccessful operations.

From April 1944 to April 1945, Sokolovsky was chief of staff of the 1st Ukrainian Front. He then served as deputy commander of the 1st Belorussian Front, under Marshal Georgy Zhukov, from April to June 1945. In these posts, he contributed to the planning of the Lvov–Sandomierz, Vistula–Oder and Berlin operations. On 29 May 1945, he was awarded the title of Hero of the Soviet Union. He was present on the Soviet side at the signing of the German surrender in May 1945. Marshal Aleksandr Vasilevsky later wrote that Sokolovsky handled both front command and staff work well, but that he showed himself most brilliantly as a chief of staff, and after the war as Chief of the General Staff.

=== Post-war career ===
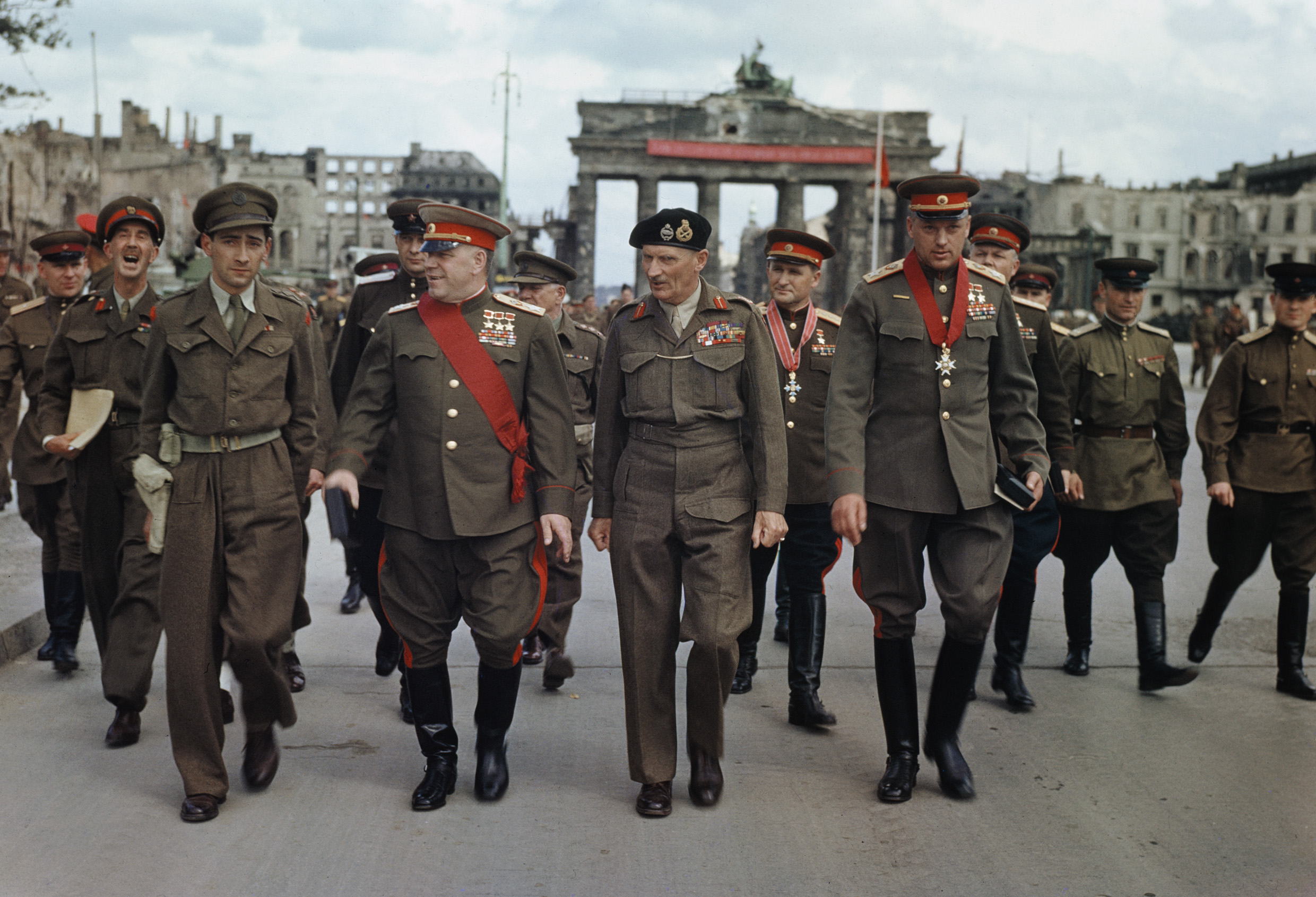
Field Marshal Bernard Montgomery decorates Soviet commanders at the Brandenburg Gate, 12 July 1945. Sokolovsky is in the background.

From July 1945, Sokolovsky was first deputy commander-in-chief of the Soviet occupation forces in Germany. On 12 July 1945, Montgomery presented him with the Order of the British Empire in Berlin. In March 1946, he succeeded Zhukov as commander-in-chief of the Soviet occupation forces in Germany and head of the Soviet Military Administration in Germany. He was also the Soviet member of the Allied Control Council. He was promoted to Marshal of the Soviet Union in 1946.

At a meeting of the Allied Control Council on 20 March 1948, Sokolovsky protested against decisions on Germany taken by the Western powers in London, declared that the council no longer existed as an organ of government, and adjourned the meeting, after which the Soviet delegation left the room. According to the Great Russian Encyclopedia, he directed the blockade of West Berlin that followed.

In March 1949, Sokolovsky returned to Moscow as first deputy minister of the armed forces, a post that from February 1950 was titled first deputy war minister. From June 1952 to April 1960, he was Chief of the General Staff and first deputy war minister, and from March 1953 first deputy defence minister. He was a full member of the Central Committee of the Communist Party from 1952 to 1961, and a candidate member from 1961. He was also a deputy of the Supreme Soviet of the Soviet Union from 1946 to 1968. From 1960 until his death, he served as an inspector general in the Group of Inspectors General of the Ministry of Defence.

== Military Strategy ==
Sokolovsky led the collective of authors that wrote Voennaya strategiya (Military Strategy), first published in 1962, with a revised edition in October 1963 and a third edition in 1968. The American analyst Thomas W. Wolfe of the RAND Corporation described it as the most comprehensive Soviet treatment of strategy since 1926, and RAND published an English translation in 1963. Wolfe also noted that the book drew a wide audience in the West. In 1985, Gareev, then a deputy chief of the General Staff, wrote that many of the book's central propositions had become obsolete since the appearance of nuclear missile weapons. The American analyst Mary C. FitzGerald described this as the first official requiem for Sokolovsky's work. Sokolovsky also led the team of authors of Razgrom nemetsko-fashistskikh voisk pod Moskvoi (The Defeat of the German Fascist Forces near Moscow, 1964).

== Death and legacy ==
Sokolovsky died in Moscow on 10 May 1968. His ashes were interred in the Kremlin Wall Necropolis on Red Square. In 1968, the Novocherkassk Higher Military Command School of Communications was named after him.

On 8 May 1965, Sokolovsky was made an honorary citizen of East Berlin. When the honorary citizen lists of East and West Berlin were merged after German reunification, only seven of the 25 East Berlin honorary citizens were kept in 1992, and Sokolovsky was among those removed. A school in Grodno is named after him.

== Personal life ==
Sokolovsky's wife was Anna Petrovna Bazhenova (1901–1977). They had a son, Yevgeny, born in 1923, and a daughter, Svetlana, born in 1924. Another daughter died in infancy.

== Honours and awards ==
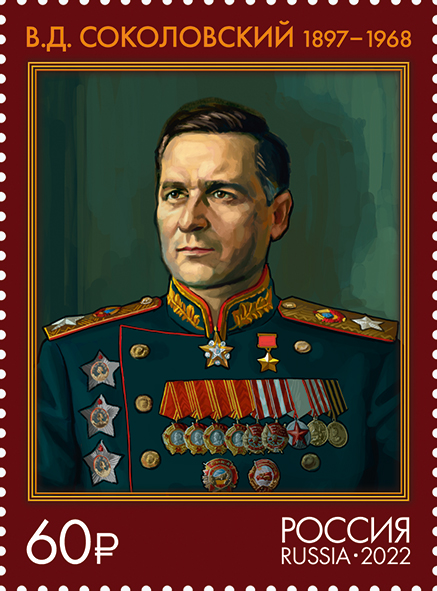
Sokolovsky on a 2022 stamp of Russia

Soviet Union

Gold Star Medal Hero of the Soviet Union (29 April 1945 – No. 6454)
Eight Orders of Lenin (22 February 1941, 2 January 1942, 21 February 1945, 29 May 1945, 20 July 1947, 24 June 1948, 20 July 1957, 20 July 1967)
Order of the October Revolution (22 February 1968)
Order of the Red Banner, three times (28 February 1928, 3 November 1944, 20 June 1949)
Order of Suvorov, 1st class, three times (9 April 1943, 28 August 1943, 6 April 1945)
Order of Kutuzov, 1st class, three times (27 August 1943, 25 August 1944, 18 December 1956)
Medal "For the Defence of Moscow" (1 May 1944)
Medal "For the Victory over Germany in the Great Patriotic War 1941–1945" (9 May 1945)
Jubilee Medal "Twenty Years of Victory in the Great Patriotic War 1941–1945" (7 May 1965)
Medal "In Commemoration of the 800th Anniversary of Moscow"
Jubilee Medal "XX Years of the Workers' and Peasants' Red Army"(22 February 1938)
Jubilee Medal "30 Years of the Soviet Army and Navy"
Jubilee Medal "40 Years of the Armed Forces of the USSR"
Jubilee Medal "50 Years of the Armed Forces of the USSR"
Honorary weapon with gold National Emblem of the Soviet Union (22 February 1968)

Foreign awards

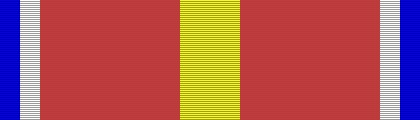
	Order of the Red Banner (Mongolia)
	Patriotic Order of Merit in gold, twice (East Germany)
	Golden Order of the Partisan Star (Yugoslavia)
	Commander's Cross of the Virtuti Militari (Poland)
	Cross of Grunwald, 3rd class (Poland)
	Medal "For Warsaw 1939–1945" (Poland)
	Medal "For Oder, Neisse and the Baltic" (Poland)
	Order of the White Lion, 1st class (Czechoslovakia)
	Medal "In Commemoration of the Battle of Dukla Pass" (Czechoslovakia)
	Medal of the Order of the Slovak National Uprising (Czechoslovakia)
	Commander, Legion of Merit (US)
	Grand Officer of Legion of Honour (France)
	Honorary Knight Commander of the Order of the British Empire (Military Division) (UK)
	Medal of Sino-Soviet Friendship (China)
?	Order of the Republic (Tuvan People's Republic, 31 March 1942)

Military offices
Preceded by Sergei Shtemenko	Chief of the General Staff of the Armed Forces of the Soviet Union; June 1952 – April 1960	Succeeded by Matvei Zakharov
