= Yakov Dashevsky =

Soviet general (1902–1972)

Yakov Sergeyevich Dashevsky
- Born: 18 April 1902; Kherson, Kherson Governorate, Russian Empire (now in Kherson Oblast, Ukraine)
- Died: 8 February 1972 (aged 69); Moscow, Soviet Union
- Burial place: Novodevichy Cemetery, Moscow
- Military career
- Allegiance: Soviet Union
- Branch: Red Army
- Service years: 1921–1965
- Rank: Lieutenant-general
- Commands: 333rd Rifle Division (1941–1942)
- Conflicts: World War II
- Awards: Order of Lenin

Yakov Sergeyevich Dashevsky (Russian: Яков Серге́евич Дашевский; 18 April 1902, Kherson - 8 February 1972, Moscow) was a Soviet Red Army military intelligence officer and lieutenant-general.

Dashevsky joined the Red Army in 1921 and its Intelligence Directorate in the early 1930s. He took part in World War II as chief of staff and commanding officer of the 333rd Rifle Division in 1941-1942, and chief of staff for the 9th, 47th and 51st Armies in 1942-1945.

Awarded the rank of lieutenant-general in 1944, Dashevsky was the chief of staff for the Ural Military District in 1945-1947 and next served as the deputy head of the General Staff Academy's Operations Department until his retirement in 1965.

== Biography ==
Yakov Dashevsky was born in 1902 in Kherson, then part of the Russian Empire's Kherson Governorate (now in Kherson Oblast, Ukraine), and came from a Jewish family.

He joined the Red Army in 1921 and studied at a military communications school until 1926. He subsequently served as a platoon leader in signals companies and battalions from October 1926 to August 1930, when he was assigned to work in the Intelligence Directorate of the Red Army. He joined the Communist Party in 1928.

Dashevsky attended the Frunze Military Academy from May 1933 to May 1934, then served as chief of the 3rd and 4th Departments of the Red Army's Intelligence Directorate from May 1934 to May 1935. His subsequent Intelligence Directorate assignments between May 1935 and June 1939 were as assistant to the chief of the 5th Department, and deputy chief and acting chief of the 6th Department. He was appointed an instructor at the S. M. Budyonny Military Electrotechnical Academy in June 1939. Dashevsky attended the General Staff Academy from October 1939 until July 1941.

Dashevsky was named the chief of staff of the 333rd Rifle Division in 1941, and also served as its commanding officer until 1942. He next served as the chief of staff for the 9th, 47th and 51st Armies in 1942-1945, and was promoted from major-general to lieutenant-general on 31 October 1944.

Dashevsky was appointed chief of staff for the Ural Military District in 1945-1947. He joined the faculty of the Voroshilov Military Academy of the General Staff in 1947 and served as deputy chief of the General Staff Academy's Operations Department until his retirement from military service in May 1965.

He died in Moscow on 8 February 1972 and was interred at Novodevichy Cemetery.

== Awards ==
He was awarded the Order of Lenin, four Orders of the Red Banner, Order of the Red Star, two Orders of Kutuzov (1st and 2nd class), and the Order of Bogdan Khmelnitsky, 3rd class.
