= Ural Military District =

- Ural Military District on 1 January 1989
- Active: 1918–1922, 1935–1989, 1992–2001
- Country: Soviet Union (Until 1991); Russia
- Allegiance: Commander of the Troops
- Branch: Soviet Armed Forces; Russian Armed Forces
- Type: Military district
- Headquarters: Sverdlovsk
- Decorations: Order of the Red Banner

Commanders
- Notable commanders: Marshal of the Soviet Union Georgy Zhukov

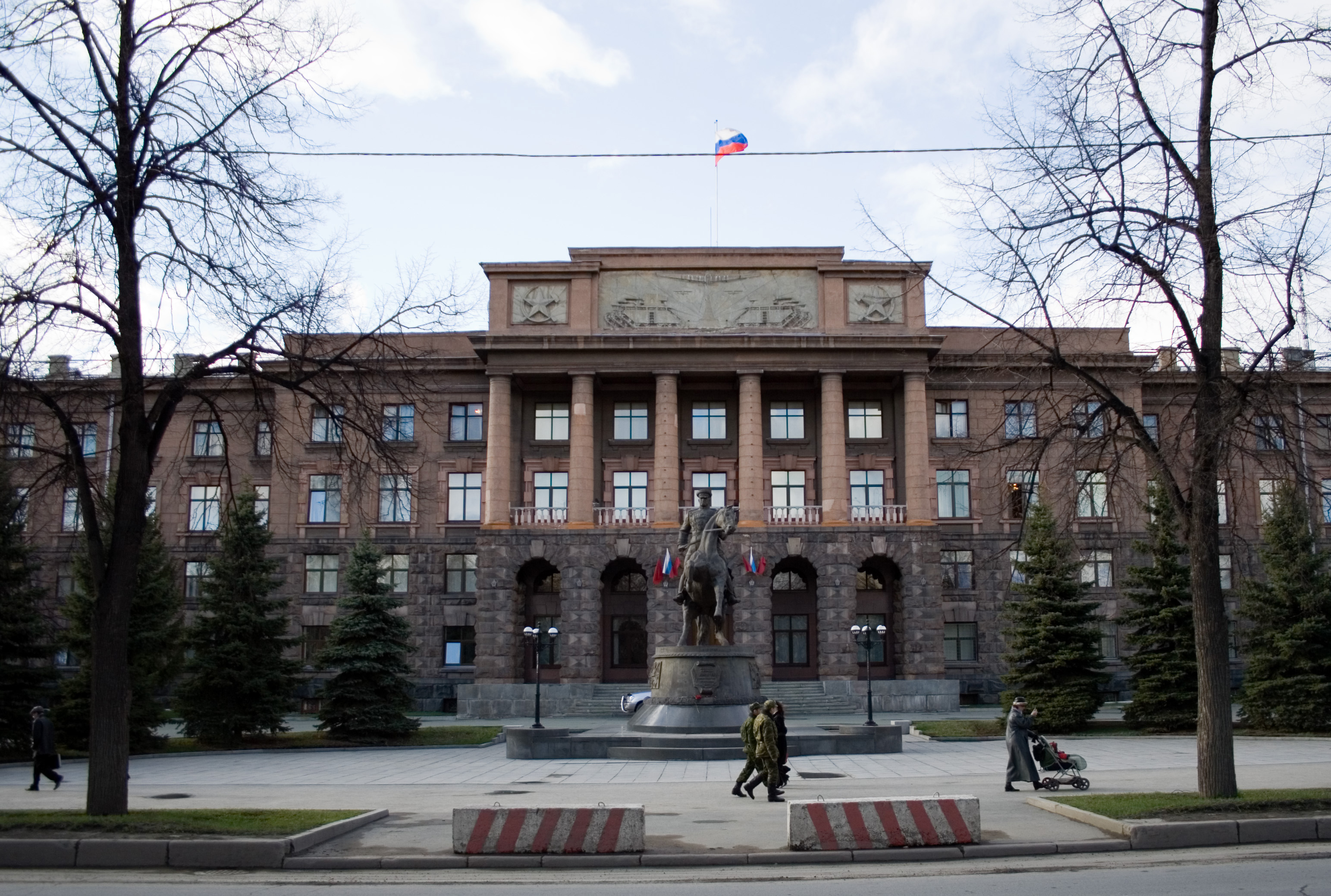
The building of the Headquarters of the Ural Military District in the city of Yekaterinburg

The Red Banner Ural Military District was an operational–strategic territorial association of the Armed Forces of the Soviet Union and the Russian Federation, which existed in 1918–1922, 1935–1989 and 1992–2001.

The district headquarters was located in Sverdlovsk (Yekaterinburg). From 1919 to 1922, it was called the Priuralsky Military District.

== History ==
The Ural Military district was formed on 4 May 1918 on the territory that included the Perm, Ufa, Orenburg, Vyatka and Kazan (until July 1918) Provinces. The Headquarters (District Military Commissariat) was located in Yekaterinburg.

From the summer of 1918, the district became a battleground of the Civil War. Most of the territory of the district was occupied by White forces; Vyatka Province and part of Perm Province remained under the control of the Reds. The district administration was evacuated to Perm, then to Vyatka and from there to Penza. The district itself from the beginning of 1919 was subordinate to the commander of the 3rd Army, from April to November 1919 – to the commander of the Eastern Front. After the expulsion of the armies of Alexander Kolchak from the territory of the district in October 1919, the headquarters returned to Yekaterinburg. In October–November 1919, the district temporarily included Omsk, Tobolsk and Chelyabinsk Provinces. In April 1920, the Tyumen Province was transferred to the district (in May, it was transferred to the West Siberian Military District, in February 1921, it was returned to the Urals Military District), in March 1921 – the Bashkir Autonomous Socialist Soviet Republic, in May 1921 – the North Dvina Province.

On 3 October 1919, the district was renamed into Priuralsky, and in 1922, it was disbanded. The territory became part of, and the troops were transferred to the West Siberian, Volga, Moscow and Petrograd Military Districts.

On 17 May 1935, the Ural Military District was again created as part of the Kirov Territory, the Sverdlovsk and Chelyabinsk Regions, the Bashkir and Udmurt Autonomous Socialist Soviet Republic. The district headquarters and directorates were located in Sverdlovsk. By 1941, the territory of the district included the Sverdlovsk, Molotovsk, Chelyabinsk, Kustanai Regions and the western part of the Omsk Region.

The Great Patriotic War occupies a special place in the history of the Ural Military District.

In June 1941, the 22nd Army was formed on the basis of the Ural Military District and then redeployed to the Western Special Military District, which became the Western Front with the beginning of the war. Prewar Ural Military District commander Lieutenant general Filipp Yershakov was appointed commander of the army.

And already on 26 June 1941, individual units of the 22nd Army entered defensive battles in Belarus. On 7 July, the army entered into contact with the German fascist troops along the entire defense zone.

Then, until the end of August 1941, army units stubbornly held the defensive lines in the area of the city of Velikiye Luki, pinning down large enemy forces and making it possible to deploy strategic reserves on the approaches to Moscow.

During the war years, over a hundred military educational institutions were deployed on the territory of the district, which trained a significant part of the command personnel of the active army for the front.

There were formed, trained and sent to the front more than 1.5 thousand formations, formations and units.

In the pre–war years, a number of divisions were formed in the district, which showed themselves in battles with Nazi troops.

At the beginning of November 1939, the formation with the headquarters in Perm of the 112th Rifle Division ended. In June 1941, the division became part of the formed 22nd Army. And in mid–June 1941, the 22nd Army, including the 112th Rifle Division, began to be redeployed to the Western Special Military District.

With the beginning of the war, the 112th Infantry Division took up defensive positions along the right bank of the Western Dvina River from Kraslava (Latvia) to Drissa (Belarus).

Then there were defensive battles in the north of Belarus, in the area of the Polotsk Fortified Region and near Nevel.

At Nevel, the division was completely surrounded; less than 1/3 of the personnel managed to get out.

The 112th Rifle Division, occupying a defensive zone on the right flank of the Western Front, held back the onslaught of superior enemy forces for more than three weeks.

In 1940, the 153rd Infantry Division was created – later one of the first guards divisions in the country. It entered into a battle with the Nazi invaders on 5 July 1941 near the city of Vitebsk. Covering the city from the west, it held the front for 7 days in a 40 km wide area. The Germans of the 39th Motorized Corps repeatedly offered the personnel of the division and personally to the commander, Colonel Nikolai Gagen, an ethnic German, to surrender. However, the division kept the occupied line, and retreated only when, having broken through the defenses of neighboring units on the right and left, the enemy bypassed it from the flanks with large forces of infantry and tanks, and the division ran out of ammunition and weapons. The division left the encirclement on 5 August 1941.

The division participated in the Yelninsky Operation (30 August – 6 September 1941) and for military exploits, organization, discipline and approximate order on 18 September 1941, the 153rd Rifle Division was transformed into the 3rd Guards Rifle Division. Subsequently, it participated in the Defense of Leningrad, the Sinyavin Operation, the Battle of Stalingrad, the Donbass Strategic Offensive Operation (for the capture of the settlement of Volnovakha, it was awarded the honorary name "Volnovakhskaya"), the Melitopol and Crimean Strategic Operations, the Liberation of Sevastopol, the Shauliai and Mamel Strategic Offensive and East Prussian Operations. Awarded with the Orders of the Red Banner and Suvorov.

The 61st, 62nd, 63rd, 64th and 65th Naval Rifle Brigades were formed in the district after a November–December 1941 People's Commissariat for Defence resolution.

In 1943, the 30th Ural Volunteer Tank Corps, consisting of three tank brigades, was formed on the territory of the district. The corps also included the 30th Motorized Rifle Brigade and a number of separate units and subunits. Subsequently, the corps for differences in battles was renamed the 10th Guards Ural–Lvov Volunteer Tank Corps.

In April 1945, two Ural formations – the 150th Rifle Division (Major general Vasily Shatilov) and the 171st Rifle Division (commander – Colonel Alexei Negoda) – were the first to break through to the Reichstag. The Victory Banner over the dome of the Reichstag was hoisted by the scouts of the 756th Regiment of the 150th Infantry Division Sergeants Mikhail Yegorov and Meliton Kantaria.

Almost all the Ural formations and units sent to the active army during the Great Patriotic War were awarded honorary titles, honorary titles and orders.

In the post–war years, the structure of the district has changed several times. In 1945, along with Privozhsky and Uralsky, the Kazan Military District was also created in the region as part of the Tatar, Udmurt, Mari and Chuvash Autonomous Soviet Socialist Republics, but in 1946 it was disbanded.

The 4th Independent Air Defense Army of the Soviet Air Defence Forces on 1 May 1960, in the skies over Sverdlovsk, shot down an American Lockheed U-2 reconnaissance spy plane of the United States Air Force being piloted by Francis Powers.

On 15 January 1974, by a decree of the Presidium of the Supreme Soviet of the Soviet Union, the Ural Military District was awarded the Order of the Red Banner for its great contribution to strengthening the country's defense power and its armed defense.

By 1983, the Ural Military District included the territories of the Sverdlovsk, Perm, Chelyabinsk, Kurgan, Kirov Regions, Komi and the Udmurt Autonomous Soviet Socialist Republic. The district headquarters was in Sverdlovsk. In 1989, the Ural Military District was merged with the Volga Military District into the Volga–Ural Military District.

In 1992, the Ural Military District was re–formed, which included the Sverdlovsk, Chelyabinsk, Kurgan and Tyumen Regions, Khanty–Mansi and Yamalo–Nenets Autonomous Districts, removed from the Siberian Military District.

In 2001, the Ural Military District was again merged with the Volga Military District into the Volga–Ural Military District.

== Composition of the Ural Military District in 1988 ==
In the late 1980s, the following formations and units were part of the Ural Military District:

Formations and Units of Central and Regional Subordination

- Commander's Office, Headquarters (Sverdlovsk);
- 300th Anti–Aircraft Missile Brigade (Chelyabinsk);
- 239th Cannon Artillery Brigade (Chebarkul);
- 124th Logistics Brigade (Magnitogorsk);
- 4th Brigade of Chemical Protection (Zlatoust);
- 14th Brigade of Chemical Protection (Revda);
- 29th Brigade of Chemical Protection (Sverdlovsk);
- 71st Engineer Brigade (Ufa);
- 116th Engineering Brigade (Sverdlovsk);
- 129th Road Commandant Brigade (Ufa);
- 141st Separate Sivashsky Red Banner Communications Regiment (Sverdlovsk);
- 189th Separate Rear Communications Regiment (Sverdlovsk);
- 180th Separate Mixed Aviation Squadron (Sverdlovsk);
- 371st Separate Battalion of Security and Support of the Headquarters (Sverdlovsk);
- 1105th Separate Electronic Warfare Battalion (Chelyabinsk);
- 414th Separate Repair and Restoration Battalion of Vehicles (Gagarsky);
- 424th Separate Pontoon Bridge Battalion (Krasnoufimsk);
- 425th Separate Engineer Battalion (Alapaevsk);
- 822nd Separate Special–Purpose Company of the Main Intelligence Directorate (Sverdlovsk);
- 15th Separate Automobile Company of Multi–Axle Heavy Wheeled Tractors (Gagarsky);
- 73rd Communication Center (Sverdlovsk);
- 6499th Repair and Restoration Base (Chebarkul);
- 473rd District Educational Lisichansk Red Banner Center (Note: Until 1989, 44th Training Tank Division) (Kamyshlov);
- 471st District Training Sivash Red Banner, Order of Suvorov Center (Note: Until 1987, the 78th Training Motorized Rifle Division, was then transformed in 1989 into the 5355th Storage Base for Weapons and Equipment) (Chebarkul).

Divisions of District Subordination

- 34th Motorized Rifle Simferopol Red Banner, Order of Suvorov Division Named After Sergo Ordzhonikidze (Sverdlovsk);
- 65th Motorized Rifle Rechitsa Red Banner Cadre Division (Note: In 1989, it was reorganized into the 5078th Storage Base for Weapons and Equipment) (Perm);
- 163rd Motorized Rifle Division of the Cadre (Belebey);
- 165th Motorized Rifle Division of the Cadre (Poroshino);
- 166th Motorized Rifle Division of the Cadre (Note: The 65th Motorized Rifle Division in 1989 was reorganized into the 5078th Storage Base for Weapons and Equipment) (Alkino);
- 248th Motorized Rifle Division of the Cadre (Note: The 248th Motorized Rifle Division in 1987 was reorganized into the 1060th Territorial Training Center) (Sarapul);
- 257th Spare Motorized Rifle Division of the Cadre (Chebarkul);
- 260th Spare Motorized Rifle Division of the Cadre (Note: The 260th Reserve Motorized Rifle Division in 1989 was reorganized into the 5406th Storage Base for Weapons and Equipment) (Shadrinsk);
- 240th Division of Rear Cadre Protection (Sverdlovsk);
- 59th Reserve Tank Division of the Cadre (Chebarkul);
- 61st Reserve Tank Division of the Cadre (Sverdlovsk);
- 63rd Reserve Tank Division of the Cadre (Verkhnyaya Pyshma);
- 82nd Reserve Tank Division of the Cadre (Elansky).

=== Air Force and Air Defense ===
The district did not have its own Air Force. On the territory of the district, units of the 4th Red Banner Army of the Air Defense with headquarters in the city of Sverdlovsk were based.

- 19th Corps of Air Defense (Chelyabinsk);
- 20th Corps of Air Defense (Sverdlovsk).

=== Strategic Rocket Forces ===
The 31st Missile Army was based on the territory of the district:

- 8th Missile Melitopol Red Banner Division;
- 42nd Missile Division;
- 52nd Missile Tarnopol–Berlin, Red Banner, Order of Bogdan Khmelnitsky Division;
- 59th Missile Division.

== Composition of the District Troops in the 1990s ==
The basis of the troops of the newly formed Ural Military District in 1992 was made up of the following formations and units:

- 15th Guards Tank Mozyr Red Banner, Order of Suvorov Division (the withdrawal of the division from the Central Group of Forces was finally completed in 1991 in the city of Chebarkul. The division was disbanded in December 1999 with seven of its units at Chebarkul becoming part of the 34th Motor Rifle Division.);
- 34th Motorized Rifle Simferopol Red Banner, Order of Suvorov Division Named After Sergo Ordzhonikidze (Yekaterinburg);
- 5355th Weapons and Equipment Storage Base (reduced from 471st District Training Sivash Red Banner, the Order of Suvorov Center, in Chebarkul, in 1989). The storage base was disbanded in 1994.
- 473rd District Training Lisichansk Red Banner Center (Kamyshlov, Sverdlovsk Oblast);
- 12th Separate Spetsnaz Brigade (Asbest–5, Sverdlovsk Oblast) (Military Unit Number 25642);
- 29th Separate Brigade of Radiation, Chemical and Biological Protection (Yekaterinburg);
- 119th Rocket Brigade (Elansky) (surface to surface missiles);
- Separate Communications Regiment (Kalinovka);
- Separate Engineer Brigade (Alapaevsk);
- 1311th Tank Reserve Base (Military Unit Number 42716)(Verkhnyaya Pyshma, Sverdlovsk Oblast);
- Engineering Warehouse (Losiny, Sverdlovsk Oblast);
- Signal Corps Training Center (Verkhnyaya Pyshma);
- Communication Equipment Storage Base (Pyrlovka, near Nizhny Tagil).

The 57th Guards Motor Rifle Division withdrew from Germany in April 1993 and moved to Chelyabinsk, as part of the district. It was disbanded in June 1993.

At the end of 1995, there were 1200 tanks, 1200 armored combat vehicles, 750 guns and mortars on the territory of the Ural Military District.

== Command of the Troops of the District ==
=== District Commanders ===
- May 1918 – January 1919 – Philip Goloshchekin (District Military Commissar);
- January – October 1919 – Sergei Anuchin (District Military Commissar);
- October 1919 – July 1920 – Adam Semashko (District Military Commissar);
- July – August 1920 – Julius Dukat (Temporary Acting);
- August 1920 – July 1922 – Sergei Mrachkovsky;
- May 1935 – May 1937 – Corps Commander Ilya Garkavy;
- May 1937 – Corps Commander Boris Gorbachev;
- May – August 1937 – Corps Commander Jan Gailit;
- August 1937 – July 1938 – Corps Commander Georgy Sofronov;
- July 1938 – June 1941 – Corps Commander (from June 1940 – Lieutenant general) Filipp Yershakov;
- June – November 1941 – Colonel Ilya Zhernakov (Temporary Acting);
- November 1941 – February 1945 – Major general (from October 1943 – Lieutenant General) Alexander Katkov;
- February 1945 – February 1948 – Colonel general Fyodor Kuznetsov;
- February 1948 – March 1953 – Marshal of the Soviet Union Georgy Zhukov;
- May 1953 – January 1956 – Colonel General (from August 1955 – General of the Army) Mikhail Kazakov;
- January 1956 – November 1957 – General of the Army Nikolai Krylov;
- January 1958 – June 1960 – Colonel General (from May 1959 – General of the Army) Dmitry Lelyushenko;
- June 1960 – July 1961 – Colonel General Jacob Kreiser;
- July 1961 – September 1965 – Colonel General Ivan Tutarinov;
- October 1965 – April 1970 – Lieutenant General of Tank Forces (from May 1966 – Colonel General) Alexander Yegorovsky;
- May 1970 – May 1980 – Colonel General Nikolai Silchenko;
- May 1980 – December 1983 – Lieutenant General (from May 1980 – Colonel General) Mikhail Tyagunov;
- December 1983 – November 1984 – Colonel General Ivan Gashkov;
- November 1984 – July 1987 – Lieutenant General of Tank Forces (from February 1985 – Colonel General) Nikolai Grachev;
- July 1987 – January 1989 – Lieutenant General (from February 1988 – Colonel General) Nikolai Madudov;
- January 1989 – September 1991 – Lieutenant General (from May 1989 – Colonel General) Albert Makashov;
- 16 July 1992 – December 1999 – Colonel General Yury Grekov;
- December 1999 – 22 January 2000 – Colonel General Vyacheslav Tikhomirov;
- 24 March 2000 – 19 July 2001 – Colonel General Alexander Baranov.

=== Members of the Military Council ===
- May 1935 – July 1937 – Divisional Commissar (from January 1937 – Corps Commissar) Grigory Zinoviev;
- July 1937 – December 1937 – Divisional Commissar Alexander Tarutinsky;
- December 1937 – February 1939 – Divisional Commissar Timofey Nikolaev;
- February 1939 – June 1941 – Divisional Commissar (from April 1940 – Corps Commissar) Dmitry Leonov;
- June 1941 – October 1941 – Divisional Commissar Anatoly Katkov;
- October 1941 – December 1942 – Divisional Commissar (from December 1942 – Major General) Dmitry Gapanovich;
- December 1942 – July 1945 – Major General Nikolai Abramov;
- July 1945 – May 1947 – Major General Alexander Fominykh;
- May 1947 – July 1950 – Lieutenant General Dmitry Gapanovich;
- July 1950 – October 1951 – Lieutenant General Nikolai Istomin;
- November 1951 – May 1954 – Lieutenant General Nikolai Nachinkin;
- May 1954 – September 1957 – Lieutenant General Vasily Shmanenko;
- September 1957 – August 1961 – Lieutenant General Vasily Boyko;
- August 1961 – May 1963 – Major General (from February 1963 – Lieutenant General) Alexei Gorbatenko;
- July 1963 – January 1971 – Major General (from June 1965 – Lieutenant General) Pyotr Vashura;
- January 1971 – June 1975 – Major General (from December 1971 – Lieutenant General) Mikhail Morozov;
- June 1975 – August 1980 – Major General (from December 1978 – Lieutenant General) Viktor Samoilenko;
- August 1980 – October 1982 – Major General (from May 1981 – Lieutenant General) Valentin Serebryakov;
- September 1982 – December 1984 – Lieutenant General Vladimir Sharygin;
- December 1984 – June 1987 – Major General (from November 1985 – Lieutenant General) Oleg Zinchenko;
- June 1987 – August 1989 – Major General (from April 1988 – Lieutenant General) Boris Tarasov.

=== Chiefs of staff ===
- May – December 1918 – Yuri Tikhmenev (Former Major General);
- December – August 1918 – Viktor Chernyshev (Former Colonel, Future Lieutenant General);
- August 1919 – June 1922 – Konstantin Artemiev (Former Lieutenant Colonel, Future Division Commander);
- May 1935 – April 1939 – Division Commander Vasily Sokolovsky;
- April 1939 – June 1941 – Brigade Commander (from June 1940 – Major General) Georgy Zakharov;
- June – July 1941 – Quartermaster 1st Rank G. S. Zhuchkov (Temporarily Acting);
- July – November 1941 – Colonel Ilya Zhernakov (Temporary Acting);
- November 1941 – April 1945 – Colonel (from May 1942 – Major General) Alexei Malinin;
- May – August 1945 – Major General Mikhail Panfilovich;
- August 1945 – January 1946 – Lieutenant General Yakov Dashevsky;
- January 1946 – July 1950 – Lieutenant General Lev Skvirsky;
- July 1950 – October 1956 – Lieutenant General Fyodor Shevchenko;
- October 1956 – July 1960 – Major General (from May 1960 – Lieutenant General) Alexander Pozharsky;
- July 1960 – April 1965 – Major General (from May 1961 – Lieutenant General) Ivan Nikitinsky;
- April 1965 – March 1967 – Major General Alexander Chumakov;
- March 1967 – March 1969 – Major General (from October 1967 – Lieutenant General) Nikolai Volivakhin;
- March 1969 – December 1971 – Major General (from May 1971 – Lieutenant General) Pyotr Samokhodsky;
- December 1971 – February 1974 – Major General (from November 1973 – Lieutenant General) Makhmut Gareev;
- February 1974 – May 1975 – Major General (from April 1975 – Lieutenant General) Mikhail Tyagunov;
- May 1975 – January 1977 – Major General (from October 1976 – Lieutenant General) Alexei Bezotosov;
- January 1977 – August 1983 – Major General (from February 1978 – Lieutenant General) Yevgeny Kuznetsov;
- August 1983 – June 1987 – Major General (from February 1985 – Lieutenant General) Boris Perfiliev;
- June 1987 – June 1991 – Major General Alexander Dvornichenko;
- June 1991 – July 1992 – Lieutenant General Leonid Mayorov;
- July 1992 – October 1992 – Lieutenant General Georgy Shpak;
- October 1992 – July 1996 – Lieutenant General Grigory Kasperovich;
- March 1997 – January 2000 – Lieutenant General Vyacheslav Tikhomirov;
- March 2000 – July 2001 – Lieutenant General Nikolai Tkachev.

=== First Deputy Commanders of the Troops ===
- November 1945 – 1948 – Lieutenant General Trifon Shevaldin;
- 1950 – June 1953 – Lieutenant General Stepan Mamonov;
- June 1953 – September 1960 – Colonel General Pavel Artemiev;
- September 1960 – October 1965 – Lieutenant General of Tank Forces Alexander Yegorovsky;
- October 1965 – September 1969 – Lieutenant General Yefim Marchenko;
- September 1969 – May 1970 – Lieutenant General Nikolai Silchenko;
- May 1970 – August 1973 – Major General (from May 1971 – Lieutenant General) Nikolai Vlasov;
- August 1973 – 1973 – Major General (from May 1974 – Lieutenant General) Konstantin Likhosherst;
- December 1981 – 1984 – Lieutenant General Ivan Chelombeyev;
- 1992 – 1998 – Lieutenant General Vasily Isaev.

== Sources ==
- Feskov, V. I.; Golikov, V. I.; Kalashnikov, K. A.; Slugin, S. A. (2013). Вооруженные силы СССР после Второй Мировой войны: от Красной Армии к Советской [The Armed Forces of the USSR after World War II: From the Red Army to the Soviet: Part 1 Land Forces] (in Russian). Tomsk: Scientific and Technical Literature Publishing. ISBN 9785895035306.
- Military Encyclopedia in 8 Volumes. Volume 6: Ogarkov – "Progress" / Chief Editor of the Commission Sergey Ivanov – Moscow: Military Publishing House of the Ministry of Defense of the Russian Federation, 2002 – 639 Pages – ISBN 5-203-01873-1 – Page 621
- Military Encyclopedia in 8 Volumes. Volume 8: Tajik – Yashin / Chief Editor of the Commission Sergey Ivanov – Moscow: Military Publishing House of the Ministry of Defense of the Russian Federation, 2004 – 579 Pages – ISBN 5-203-01875-8 – Pages 195–196
- History of the Ural Military District / Edited by Alexander Egorovsky, Ivan Tutarinov – 1 – Moscow: Military Publishing House of the Ministry of Defense of the Soviet Union, 1970 – 352 Pages – 11,500 Copies
- Team of Authors (2013). Armed Forces of the Soviet Union After World War II: From the Red Army to the Soviet (Part 1: Ground Forces). Tomsk: Publishing House of Scientific and Technical Literature. ISBN 978-5-89503-530-6.
- Team of Authors (1983). Mikhail Tyagunov (ed.). Red Banner Ural: History of the Red Banner Ural Military District. Moscow: Military Publishing House of the Ministry of Defense of the Soviet Union.
- Lensky, Andrey; Tsybin, Mikhail (2001). "Volga–Ural Military District". Soviet Ground Forces in the Last Year of the Soviet Union. Directory. Saint Petersburg: B&K. pp. 174, 178–183. ISBN 5-93414-063-9.
- Team of Authors (2018). Political Repression of the Commanding Staff, 1937–1938. Ural Military District (PDF). Saint Petersburg: Publishing and Printing Complex "Gangut". ISBN 978-5-85875-536-4.
- Venedikt Stansev. "Divo Division" – Yekaterinburg, ARGO, 1995
