= 43rd Rifle Division =

- Active: 1924–1946; 1953–1957
- Country: Soviet Union
- Branch: Red Army (1924-1946); Soviet Army (1946-1957)
- Type: Infantry
- Size: Division
- Engagements: Winter War World War II: Battle of Krasny Bor; Leningrad-Novgorod Offensive; Baltic Offensive; Courland Pocket
- Decorations: Order of the Red Banner (2)
- Battle honours: Tartu

Commanders
- Notable commanders: Vasily Sokolovsky Ilya Smirnov; Andrei Bondarev; Vladimir Kirpichnikov Andrey Matveyevich Andreyev

The 43rd Rifle Division was a formation of the Red Army, which took part in the Second World War, known to the Soviets as the "Great Patriotic War".

== History ==
The 43rd Rifle Division was formed in 1924–1925 in the Velikiye Luki region as part of the Leningrad Military District under the name of the 43rd Territorial Division. Stationed in the Western Special Military District. In autumn 1937 it was relocated directly in Leningrad. The division was awarded the Order of the Red Banner for participation in the Winter War. Fought at Oranienbaum.

On June 24, 1941, when the Northern Front was formed, it became part of the 50th Rifle Corps, 23rd Army. In 1941 it fought in the defence of the Karelian Isthmus during the Continuation War. Then from 1941 to 1944 in the siege of Leningrad, in 1944 in the Leningrad-Novgorod Offensive, the Krasnoye Selo–Ropsha Offensive, Kingisepp–Gdov Offensive, the Baltic Offensive, Tartu Offensive, the Riga Offensive, and the Memel Offensive. In 1945 it fought against the Courland Pocket. With Leningrad Front May 1945.

In the summer of 1945, the division moved to Kuybyshev, in the Ural Military District. It became the 21st Rifle Brigade in 1946 and was upgraded to a division in October 1953. On 4 June 1957, it became a motor rifle division. On 1 March 1959, the 74th and 147th Motor Rifle Regiments disbanded and were replaced by the disbanded 44th Motor Rifle Division's 118th and 126th Motor Rifle Regiments. On 24 May 1962, it was converted to a training motor rifle division. On 22 February 1968, it was awarded a second Order of the Red Banner. On 14 September 1987, it became the 469th District Training Center. In 2004 it combined with the 473rd District Training Center.
