= Kansa Taisteli =

Finnish military and men's magazine (1957-1986)

- Categories: Men's magazine; Military magazine
- Frequency: Quarterly (1957-1958); Monthly (1958-1986)
- Publisher: Bonnier Publications
- Founded: 1957
- Final issue: 1986
- Country: Finland
- Based in: Helsinki
- Language: Finnish
- ISSN: 0451-3371
- OCLC: 476922457

Kansa Taisteli (Finnish: The People Fought) was a monthly men's magazine which featured articles on the memories of the war veterans. The magazine published in Helsinki, Finland, in the period 1957–1986. It was the Finnish version of Landserheft, a German magazine.

== History and profile ==
Kansa Taisteli was launched in 1957 and published four times a year. From 1958 its frequency became monthly. The magazine was published by Bonnier Publications on a monthly basis. The content of the magazine covered the memories of the soldiers who fought in the wars between Finland and the Soviet Union in the period 1939–1944 during World War II.

In the first year Kansa Taisteli sold 30,000 copies. The circulation was 80,000 copies in 1967, but became 30,000 copies in 1986 when it ceased publication.
