= Uzytamak =

Uzytamak Узытамак
- Selo
- Location within Bashkortostan Location within Russia
- Coordinates: 54°38′N 55°33′E
- Country: Russia
- Region: Bashkortostan
- District: Chishminsky District
- Time zone: UTC+5:00

Uzytamak (Russian: Узытамак; Bashkir: Уҙытамаҡ, Uźıtamaq) is a rural locality (a selo) and the administrative centre of Alkinsky Selsoviet, Chishminsky District, Bashkortostan, Russia. The population was 222 as of 2010. There are 4 streets.

== Geography ==
Uzytamak is located 22 km northeast of Chishmy (the district's administrative centre) by road. Alkino is the nearest rural locality.
