= 153rd Rifle Division (1940–1941) =

- Active: August 1940 – September 1941
- Country: Soviet Union
- Branch: Red Army
- Type: Infantry
- Engagements: Battle of Smolensk

Commanders
- Notable commanders: Nikolai Gagen

The 153rd Rifle Division (Russian: 153-я стрелковая дивизия) was an infantry division of the Red Army during World War II, active from 1940 to 1941. For its actions in the Dukhovshchina offensive during the Battle of Smolensk it became the 3rd Guards Rifle Division.

== History ==
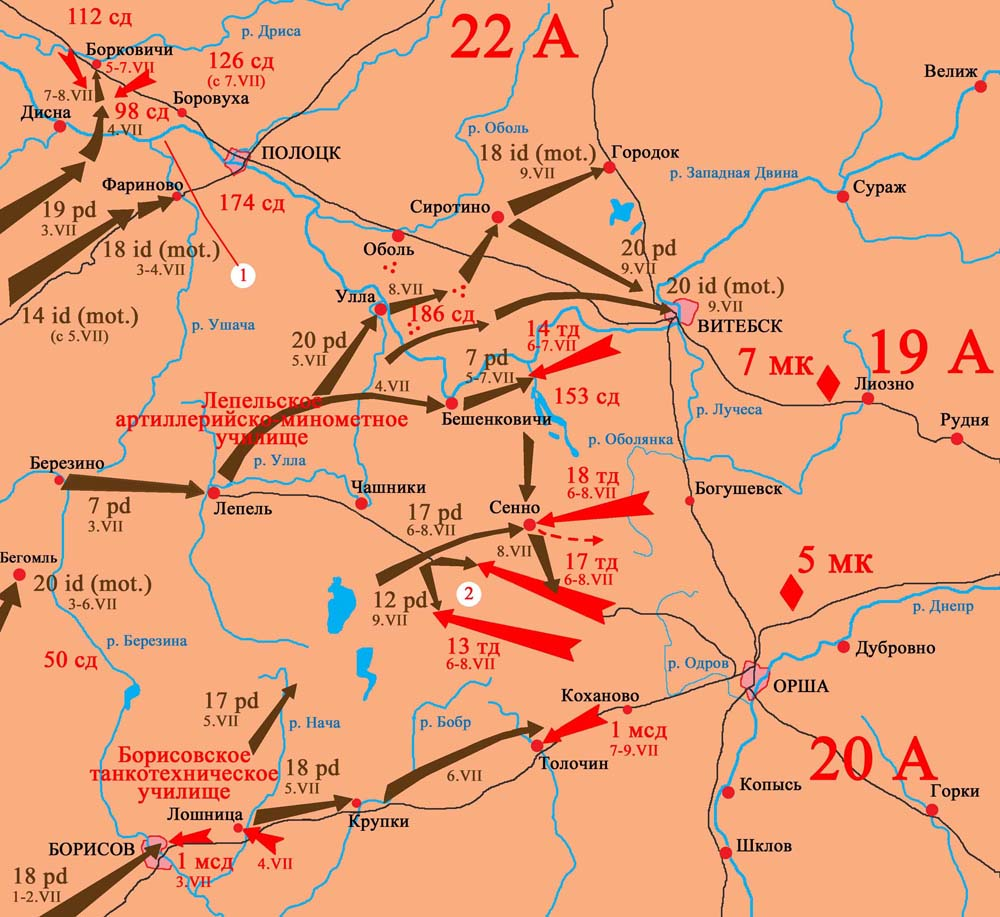
Defense of Vitebsk, July 1941

The 153rd Rifle Division was formed in Sverdlovsk in August 1940, under the command of Colonel Nikolai Gagen. The division included the 435th, 505th, and 666th Rifle Regiments, the 565th Light Artillery Regiment, the 581st Howitzer Artillery Regiment, and other smaller support units. Before June 1941, the division conducted training in the Kamyshlov camps, part of the Ural Military District. In the first half of June 1941 the division was relocated by rail across the Soviet Union to the city of Vitebsk, Belorussia, as part of the 62nd Rifle Corps of the 22nd Army. The first three troop trains of the division arrived in Vitebsk on 22 June, the day Operation Barbarossa began. The division fully concentrated at Vitebsk only on 27 June. Unloading at Vitebsk, the division was manned to its peacetime strength of 6,000 men. In order to get the division to wartime strength, between 22 and 27 June, the local military commissariats sent reinforcements to the division. However, most of these recruits lacked training, but in a week the division was declared combat-ready. The division took up defensive positions around Vitebsk on 26 June, on a broad front running from Gnezdilovichi through Kholm, the sovkhoz of Khodtsy, Moshkany, and Burdeli to the station of Krynki. The forward detachment from the 435th Regiment reached the village of Upla-2, that of the reconnaissance battalion the village of Beshenkovichi, that of the 666th Regiment the village of Verkhovye, and that of the 505th Regiment the village of Senno. The division was shifted to the 69th Rifle Corps of the 20th Army on 4 July.

On these lines, the forward detachments entered battle on 5 July against strong German motorized forces attempting to break through to Vitebsk. The main forces of the division entered battle on 7 July in the areas of Gnezdilovichi, Shchikotovschina, Pavlovichi, and Khodtsy. The German troops, with strong motorized infantry forces and tanks, developing the offensive, tried to break through to Vitebsk along the Beshenkovichi–Vitebsk highway, and reached the defensive lines of the 153rd on 7 July. During the entire day the 153rd, in intense fighting with the advancing German troops, stopped the German advance. The German units, engaging the 153rd, simultaneously began advancing on Vitebsk along the Polotsk–Vitebsk highway and farther to the south on the Senno–Bugushevsk highway, flanking the division from north and south. Due to the emerging threat of encirclement, the division carried out a partial regrouping on 8 July, shifting its defense to the line of Gnezdilovichi, Kholm, Khodtsy, Moshkany, and Shchemilovka.

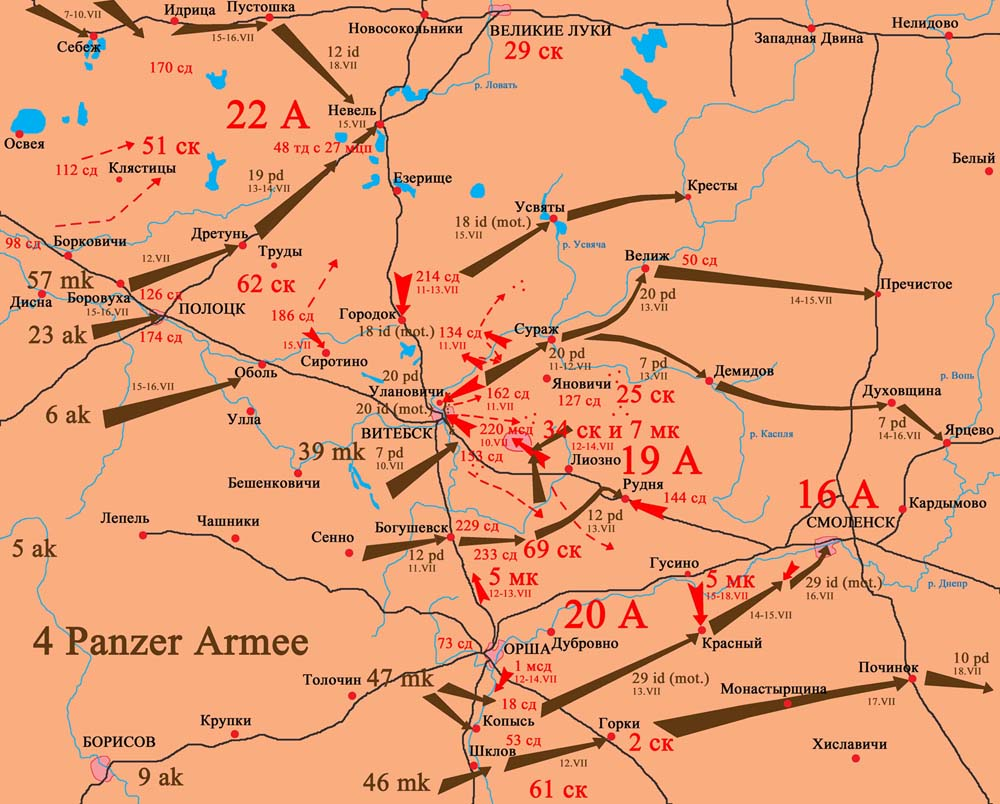
Battle of Smolensk, 10 to 18 July

Not finding success through frontal attacks against the 153rd, the German forces outflanked the division and by the end of 10 July cut the Gorodok–Vitebsk and Polotsk–Vitebsk highways, captured the western part of the city itself, and reached the western bank of the Western Dvina. Developing the offensive towards Smolensk the German troops outflanked the 153rd, as a result of which the division found itself fully encircled by 14 July, deep in the German rear. The 153rd ended up on the line of the eastern bank of the Luchessa in the area of the road junction of Popovka, Karpovichi, and the station of Krynki on 11 July as a result of the German capture of Vitebsk. The division fought in encirclement from 11 July, attempting to fight its way to the main units of the army. On the morning of 17 July the division reached the west bank of the Chernitsa river near Sleptsy, Loguny and Karoli.

German troops attempted to destroy the 153rd on the Chernitsa. Here Gagen decided to break through the encirclement ring on the narrow front between 1st Vinokorno, Rublevo and Kovenskoye, force the Chernitsa and move further to the Smolensk region to escape the encirclement. On 17 July the reconnaissance battalion in the area of Zhary, south of Liozno, and two companies from the 505th Regiment in the area of Pioramont, northwest of Dobromysl, conducted reconnaissance and a deception crossing attempt. This drew German attention away from the real crossing point. After two days of battle, the units of the division by noon on 18 July captured the crossing. By the end of the day the division forced the Chernitsa and broke out of the encirclement. On the night of 18–19 July all rifle regiments with the guns of the artillery regiment and rear units reached the area of Gorbovo, where they spent a few hours regrouping. The same night the division completed a march and by the morning of 19 July reached the major rode junction of Lyubavichi.

On 19 and 20 July the 153rd was involved in sustained fighting on the line of Zorichi and Lyubavichi, and by 12:00 fought its way through this line and reached the area of Zhukovo and Yeliseyevka. Here on 20 and 21 July the division attempted to fight its way to the north towards Rudnya. Faced with fresh German troops it was unsuccessful and instead attacked to the south. Under the cover of rear guard detachments on the night of 21–22 July it conducted a 35 kilometer march and by the morning of 22 July reached the Vitebsk–Smolensk highway in the area of Nadva. Here the units of the division, during the next tow days, conducted prolonged defensive battles with German tanks and infantry seeking to capture the Smolensk–Vitebsk and Moscow–Minsk highway junctions.

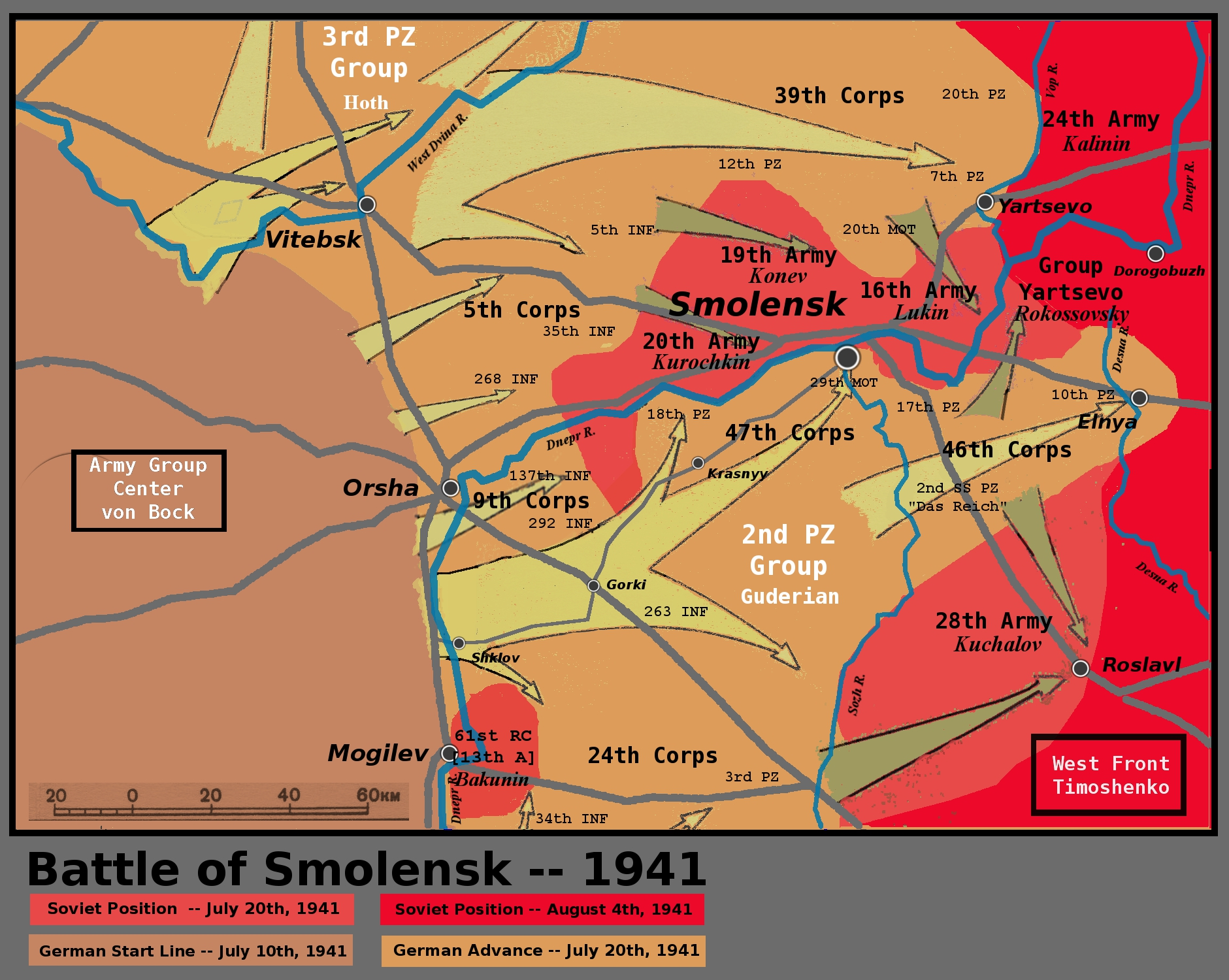
The Smolensk pocket, to 4 August

The division, reaching the area of Mirskoye and Tishino on 24 July, was again subjected to German attack and spent the entire day in defensive battles. During 25 and 26 July the division retreated from the area of Mirskoye and Tishino and conducted defensive battles in the area of Bochary and Nizhnaya Dubrovka, against German troops attacking from the north, northwest, and south. On the night of 26 to 27 July, the units of division under the cover of rear guards withdrew and took up defense in the area of Ryazanovo, Zaborye, and the sovkhoz of Zhukovo. On this line the division for two days, 27 and 28 July, fought with strong German infantry and tank forces, attacking from the north and southwest. On the night of 28–29 July the units of the division carried out an organized withdrawal and under the cover of rear guard detachments began to retreat towards Radchino. The 153rd launched an unsuccessful counterattack from the Lapushki area towards Smolensk on 29 July.

The rear guard detachments, consisting of the 3rd Battalion of the 435th Regiment, 2nd Battalion of the 505th Regiment, and 1st Battalion of the 666th Regiment, covered the retreat of the main forces of the division in heavy fighting with superior German forces. Especially fierce fighting took place in the areas of Korelli and Sukhodol between 20 and 30 July and in the area of the station of Kardymovo on 31 July. From 1 to 3 August the division crossed the Dnieper under fire with its equipment and rear units in the area of Zaborye and reached the eastern bank of the river. However, the weeks of fighting took a heavy toll on the 153rd, reducing it to about 750 men by 5 August. At the same time, elements of the division continued fighting to hold a bridgehead on the western bank in the crossing area. From 4 to 22 August the division fought to retain and expand its bridgehead on the line of Lekhovo, Radchino, and Golovino. Through this it secured the crossing of units and equipment of the 20th and 16th Armies. The division received replacements during this period and by 15 August numbered 5,497 personnel with 2,444 rifles, 39 machine guns, 21 guns, and 13 mortars.

The 153rd relocated to the area of Mogilitsy on 23 August, tasked with the offensive on the line of Hill 249.9, and Vishnyaki, capturing Hill 249.9 and cutting the Smolensk–Yelnya railroad, the main supply route for the German troops around Yelnya. Hill 249.9, strongly fortified by the German troops, was the key to the position and by taking it Soviet troops could gain full control of the railroad line. On the night of 24–25 August the division took starting positions for the offensive on a line immediately to the northwest and northeast of the hill. From the morning of 25 August the division, following an artillery preparation, overcame the German opposition to storm the hill and after two hours of hand-to-hand combat fully controlled it. During the following three days, units of the division repulsed German counterattacks seeking to regain the hill and consolidated control of the hill. The division was withdrawn to the second echelon on 29 August, in the area of Balakirevo and Samoylovo, where it regrouped. The 153rd conducted defensive battles on the line of the Dnieper from 1 to 6 September.

The division was withdrawn from battle on 8 September, beginning a march to the station of Izdeshkovo. The division was fully concentrated in the area of the station on 10 September. On the next day, the division loaded into troop trains and on 15 September arrived in Kalinin, where it began rebuilding in the Voroshilovsky camps. For their actions in the Smolensk pocket, 36 soldiers of the division were decorated, among them division commander Gagen who received the Order of Lenin. In recognition of the performance of the division in the Dukhovshchina offensive the division was reorganized as the 3rd Guards Rifle Division on 18 September, becoming one of the first Guards units in the Red Army.
