= Kalinovka, Chernushinsky District, Perm Krai =

Kalinovka Калиновка
- Selo
- Location within Perm Krai Location within Russia
- Coordinates: 56°41′N 56°18′E
- Country: Russia
- Region: Perm Krai
- District: Chernushinsky District
- Time zone: UTC+5:00

Kalinovka (Russian: Калиновка) is a rural locality (a selo) in Chernushinsky District, Perm Krai, Russia. The population was 512 as of 2010. There are 3 streets.

== Geography ==
Kalinovka is located 38 km northeast of Chernushka (the district's administrative centre) by road. Korobeyniki is the nearest rural locality.
