= Battle of Vyborg (1941) =

Battle during the Continuation War

- Part of Continuation War
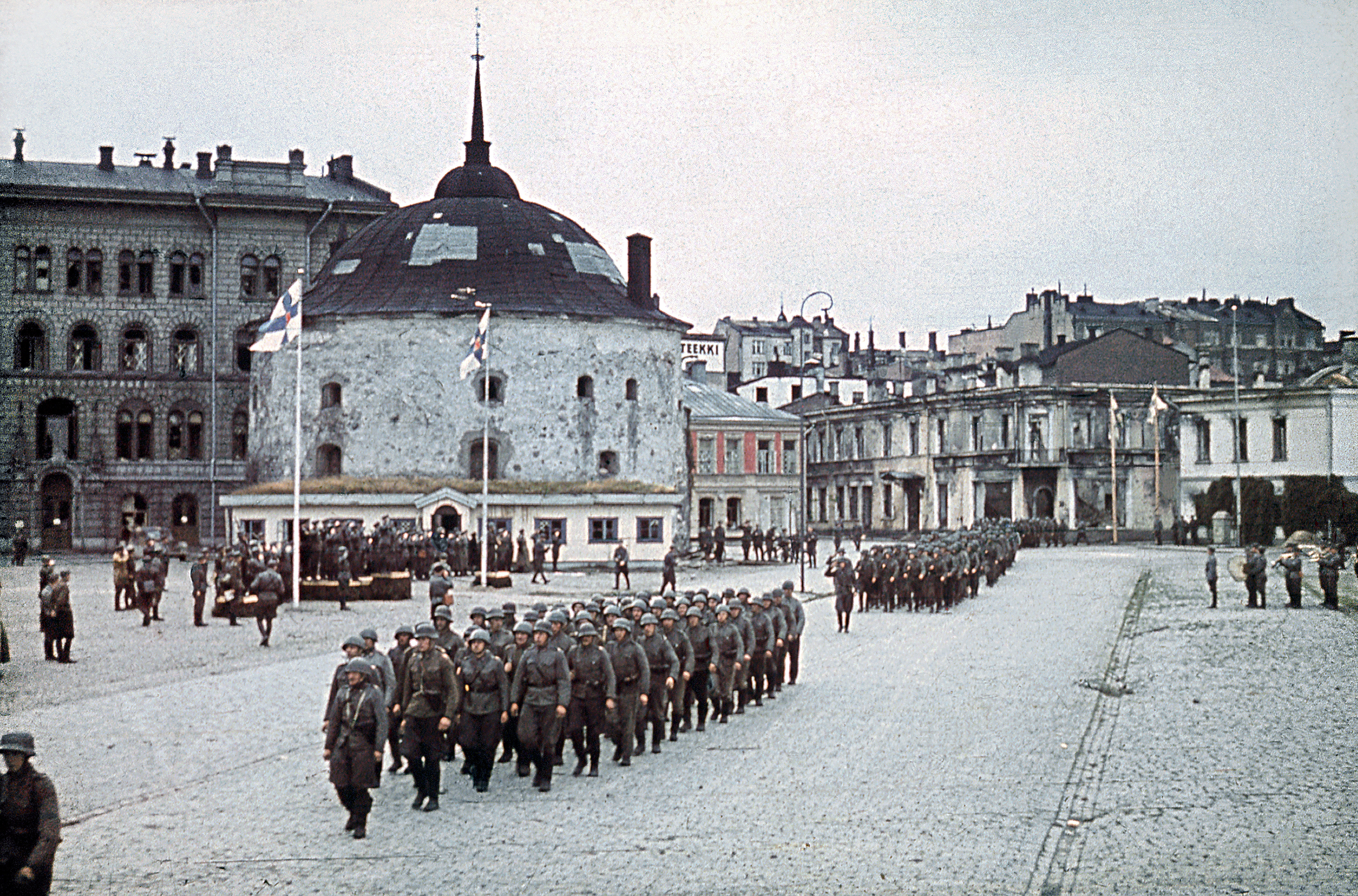
- Finnish forces parading near the Round Tower in the aftermath of the battle.
Date	21 August – 1 September 1941
Location	Vyborg, Karelian Isthmus, Soviet Union
Result	Finnish victory

Belligerents
Finland	Soviet Union

Commanders and leaders
(Finland) Erik Heinrichs (Finland) Karl Lennart Oesch (Finland) Taavetti Laatikainen	(Soviet Union) Markian Popov (Soviet Union) P.S. Pshennikov (Soviet Union) M.N. Gerasimov

Strength
40,000	34,547

The Battle of Vyborg was a significant battle during the Finnish invasion of the Karelian Isthmus, part of the Continuation War. The battle took place from August 21 to September 1 where Finland aimed to recapture the city of Vyborg from Soviet control. The battle ended in the Finnish recapture of Vyborg and surrounding areas.

== Background ==
=== Winter War ===
Territorial disputes between the Soviet Union and Finland caused the outbreak of the Winter War in November 1939. Several months of fighting ensued, during which the Red Army was able to push back the Finnish defenders on the Karelian Isthmus.

Following the end of the Winter War in March 1940, Finland was forced to cede part of Karelia to the Soviet Union that included Finland's 2nd largest city, Vyborg to the Soviet Union.

=== Continuation War ===
On 22 June 1941 the German Wehrmacht launched Operation Barbarossa, which was the invasion of the Soviet Union. Prior to the commencement of Operation Barbarossa, Finnish and German officers had planned for possible Finnish participation in the war against the Soviet Union. Finland mobilized 16 infantry divisions, one cavalry brigade, and two jäger brigades of the Finnish Army to the newly established border with the Soviets on 21 June, and on 22 June conducted Operation Kilpapurjehdus, an action that violated the Moscow Peace Treaty. That same day, German naval bombers began mining the waters around Leningrad, with some of the aircraft being deployed from airfields in Finland. On 25 June a flight of Soviet bombers struck at airfields in Finland, and Soviet artillery stationed in Hanko fired on Finnish targets.

As the Germans advanced towards the Daugava River, the Finnish Army prepared to enter the conflict. On 29 June Carl Gustaf Emil Mannerheim, Marshal of Finland, formed the Army of Karelia under the command of Erik Heinrichs. Combat operations against the Red Army and Soviet Air Forces commenced on 1 July, and war was declared that same day.

=== Finnish invasion of the Karelian Isthmus ===
The Finnish invasion of the Karelian Isthmus was a military campaign carried out by Finland in 1941. The aims of the offensive were to recapture the Karelian Isthmus which Finland ceded to the Soviet Union as an aftermath of the Winter War in 1940. The offensive took place from 31 July–5 September 1941.

== The Battle ==
The Finnish IV Corps were given the task of capturing the city of Vyborg. The plan for the capturing of the city was to quickly surround it and then capture it. However, the Finnish General HQ did not allow the IV corps to start pursuing the Soviet forces. By the time the permission was given, Soviet forces had already started to withdraw from their positions on the border to block the Finnish crossing of the Vuoksi river to contain the Finnish offensive. However the Soviets failed to reach the river quick enough to block the crossing of the Vuoksi by the Finnish 18th Division of the II Corps which was assisted by the Finnish 12th Division and the Light Brigade T (which was named after its commander, Colonel Tiiainen) and consisted of the 1st Jaeger Battalion (two light detachments and two artillery companies) of the IV Corps which managed to push through the Soviet lines.

The Soviet withdrawal to the narrow part of the Karelian Isthmus allowed the Soviets to bring their numbers to bear. The Soviet 115th Rifle Division and 123rd Rifle Division were tasked with throwing the Finnish back over the Vuoksi and their attack started on 24 August. The Soviet attack hit the Finnish Light Brigade T and forced the Finns to either retreat or to dig in. As a result, the Finnish brigade was immobilized and partially surrounded. On 25 August a chance artillery strike killed the Light Brigade T's commander, but then the Finnish forces relieving Light Brigade T turned back the attack and forced the Soviet divisions to retreat. The Finnish IV Corps proceeded to cut the routes south from Vyborg. On 24 August the Finnish 8th Division crossed Vyborg Bay and cut the coastal route from Vyborg. Finnish forces captured Vyborg on 29 August.

Finnish troops arrived in Vyborg from different directions on August 29. The Finnish flag was raised on the tower of Vyborg at 17:35. On August 31, a large victory parade was organized in Vyborg as the fighting still continued near the city.

== The aftermath ==
The battle resulted in significant Soviet casualties and the loss of the strategically important city of Vyborg and later the entirety of the Karelian Isthmus, which the Finns would directly annex into Finland. The areas would be retaken by the Soviets during the Vyborg–Petrozavodsk offensive which took place in 1944. The recapture of the city would mean the return of people who had previously been evacuated from Karelia and Vyborg during the Evacuation of Finnish Karelia
