= Nikolai Gagen =

Soviet Lieutenant General (1895–1969)

Nikolai Alexandrovitsch Gagen
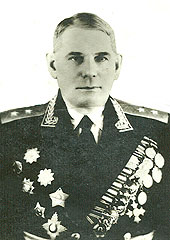
- Nikolai Gagen c. 1945
- Born: March 24 [O.S. March 12] 1895; Lakhta, Saint Petersburg
- Died: May 20, 1969 Moscow, Soviet Union
- Allegiance: Russian Empire; RSFSR; USSR
- Rank: General-lieutenant
- Awards: Order of Lenin (2)

Nikolai Alexandrovitsch Gagen (Russian: Николай Александрович Гаген) (Lakhta, Saint Petersburg, March 24 [O.S. March 12] 1895 – Moscow, May 20, 1969) was a Soviet Lieutenant General in World War II.

== Biography ==
Nikolai Gagen's ancestors were Baltic Germans which lived around Wenden in Livonia.
Gagen served as an officer in the Imperial Russian Army during World War I, joined the Reds after the October Revolution and took part in the Russian Civil War on their side. In 1939, he became a member of the Communist Party.

At the beginning of the German-Soviet War (June 1941) he commanded the 153rd Rifle Division in the 22nd Army, which was renamed the 3rd Guards Rifle Division, for its good performance during the Battle of Smolensk in September 1941. On November 9, 1941, he was promoted to Major General. At the end of January 1942, Gagen took over the 4th Guards Rifle Corps. With this Corps, he fought under the 54th Army in the Battle of Lyuban, in September 1942 under the 8th Army in the Sinyavino offensive and in early 1943 under the 1st Guards Army in Operation Gallop (in the Voroshilovgrad area).

On April 28, 1943, he was promoted to Lieutenant General and was given command of the 57th Army, which he held until October 1944. He led this Army during Operation Citadel, and as part of the 3rd Ukrainian Front in the Battle of the Dnieper, the Second Jassy–Kishinev offensive and the Belgrade Operation.

In January 1945, he returned to active service and was given command of the 26th Army deployed in southern Transdanubia, during the battle for Hungary. Among other things, Gagen took part in the defense against the German Lake Balaton offensive and, from mid-March 1945, in the Vienna offensive.

After the end of the war in Europe, he remained the commander of the 26th Army until its disbandment in September 1945. In December 1945 he became the commander of the 3rd Mountain Rifle Corps in the Carpathian Military District.
In February 1947, he became the deputy commander of the Primorsky Military District, and in 1953, deputy commander for combat training of the Far Eastern Military District. He remained in this position until January 1959, when he was transferred to the reserve due to poor health.

After being transferred to the reserve, he moved to Moscow, where he died in 1969.
He was awarded the Order of Lenin twice and the Order of the Red Banner four times.

== Sources ==
- generals.dk
- Biography on encyclopedia.mil.ru
- Biography on hrono
