= Battle of Vyborg Bay (1940) =

1940 battle of the Winter War

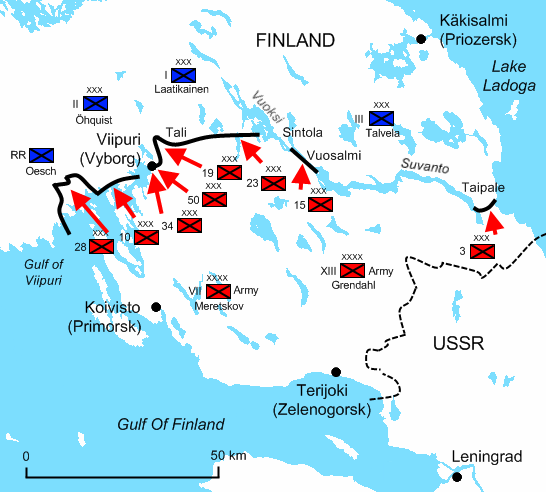
- Situation on the Karelian Isthmus on the last day of the Winter War, 13 March 1940
Date	2–13 March 1940
Location	Vyborg Bay area 60°35′N 28°31′E
Result	Ceasefire

Belligerents
Finland	Soviet Union
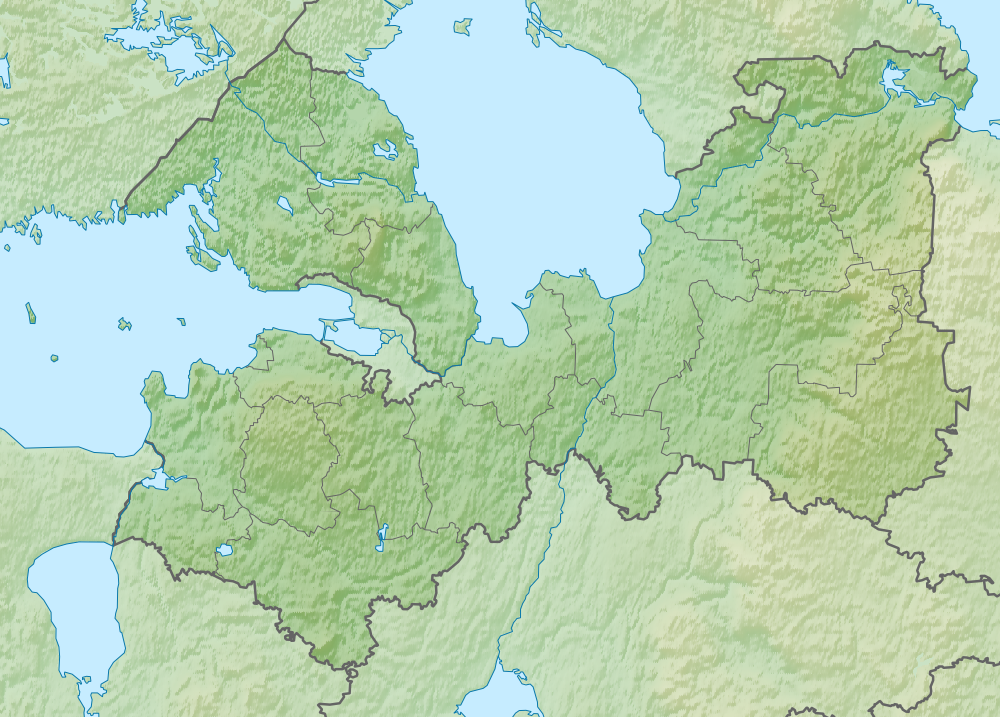
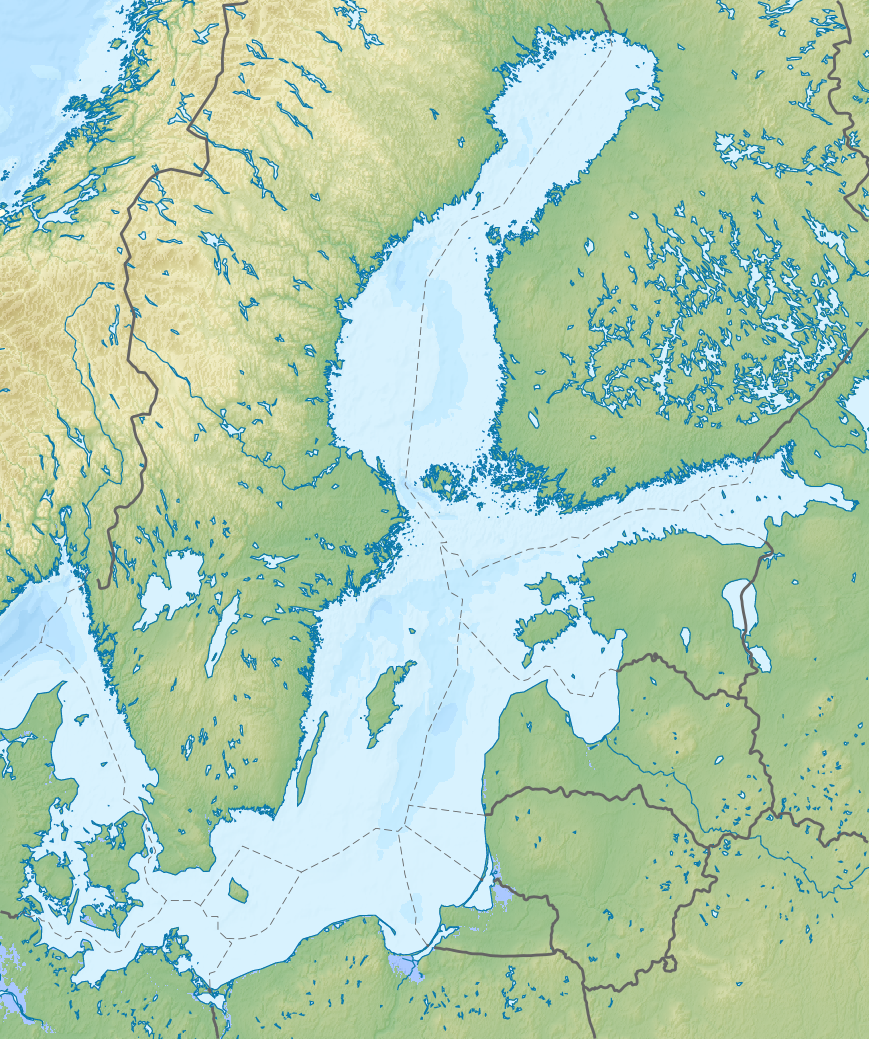
- Location within Leningrad Oblast Battle of Vyborg Bay (1940) (Finland) Battle of Vyborg Bay (1940) (Baltic Sea) Battle of Vyborg Bay (1940) (Gulf of Finland)

The Battle of Vyborg Bay or Battle of Viipuri Bay (2–13 March 1940) was the culmination of the Soviet Union's second offensive and the last battle in the Winter War.

== The Battle ==
Though the Mannerheim Line had held for two months, following the Second Battle of Summa, Field Marshal Mannerheim had ordered an orderly withdrawal to the Finnish intermediate "V-Line". On 27 February, he then ordered a withdrawal to the "T-Line", which ran from Viipuri to Tali and onwards to the Vuoksi. According to Chew, "At the end of February sizeable units of the Red Army's reserve were mustered to form the 28th Infantry Corps, which was transferred to the Seventh Army with the mission of outflanking the Second Corps across the Gulf of Viipuri." Simultaneously, Soviet attacks would proceed from Suursaari and Lavansaari Islands. The ice within the bay had frozen to the extent that it could support heavy tanks, despite Finnish attempts to form cracks by sawing or detonating the ice. On 28 February, the commander of the Finnish Kannas Army Erik Heinrichs formed the Coastal Group, under Kurt Martti Wallenius, and then later Karl Lennart Oesch.

On the night of 3-4 March, the 28th Rifle Corps crossed the gulf and attacked the Vilaniemi and Häränpäänniemi Peninsulas. They were followed by the 10th Rifle Corps attacking east of Tervajoki. On 4 March, the Soviets advanced from Suursaari and Lavansaari Islands towards Virolahti and Kotka. On 5 March, the 28th Corps pierced the Vilaniemi Peninsula defenses, prompting Mannerheim to state, "...The last minutes are at hand." On 6 March that beachhead was widened to include the Häränpäänniemi Peninsula. On 7 March the 28th Corps cut the coastal highway east of Vilajoki.

The Finnish delegation finally accepted Molotov's peace conditions in Moscow on 12 March.

== See also ==
- List of Finnish military equipment of World War II
- List of Soviet Union military equipment of World War II

== Sources ==
- The Soviet Invasion of Finland, 1939–40, by Carl Van Dyke : pp. 237–247.
