= December 1939 =

Month of 1939

<<	December 1939					>>
Su	Mo	Tu	We	Th	Fr	Sa
					1	2
3	4	5	6	7	8	9
10	11	12	13	14	15	16
17	18	19	20	21	22	23
24	25	26	27	28	29	30
31

The following events occurred in December 1939:

== December 1, 1939 (Friday) ==
- Risto Ryti replaced Aimo Cajander as Prime Minister of Finland.
- The Soviet Union created the Finnish Democratic Republic, a puppet state operating in Soviet-occupied parts of Finland.
- A recruitment office for volunteers to fight for the Finns opened in Stockholm, Sweden.

== December 2, 1939 (Saturday) ==
- The Roosevelt Administration imposed a "moral embargo" on the Soviet Union and urged American companies not to sell the Soviets airplanes or components in their manufacture.
- The Red Army took Petsamo.
- Navy defeated Army 10-0 in the Army–Navy Game in Philadelphia.
- Born: Harry Reid, politician, in Searchlight, Nevada (d. 2021)

== December 3, 1939 (Sunday) ==
- Finland appealed to the League of Nations for intervention.
- 24 Vickers Wellington bombers raided German warships at Heligoland. A German anti-aircraft battery was hit, probably the first British bomb of the war to land on German soil.
- Died: Princess Louise, Duchess of Argyll, 91, sixth child of Queen Victoria and Prince Albert

== December 4, 1939 (Monday) ==
- The German submarine U-36 was sunk in the Heligoland Bight by the British submarine Salmon.

== December 5, 1939 (Tuesday) ==
- The Soviet 7th Army reached the Mannerheim Line.
- Off the coast of Uruguay, the captain of the German passenger steamer Ussukuma decided to scuttle the ship when it was intercepted by the British cruiser Ajax. The Ajax rescued the 107 crew of the Ussukuma and interned them as enemy civilians.
- Fritz Julius Kuhn was sentenced to 2½ to 5 years in prison for larceny and forgery.

== December 6, 1939 (Wednesday) ==
- The Battle of Taipale began.
- The stage musical DuBarry Was a Lady with music by Cole Porter opened at the 46th Street Theatre on Broadway.

== December 7, 1939 (Thursday) ==
- The Battles of Kollaa and Suomussalmi began.
- SS Untersturmführer Herbert Lange began overseeing the euthanization of mentally disabled patients at the Dziekanka Psychiatric Hospital in Gniezno. Between this day and January 12, 1940, a total of 1,043 patients were loaded into a van and gassed with carbon monoxide.

== December 8, 1939 (Friday) ==
- The Roosevelt administration sent Britain a diplomatic note protesting the British policy of seizing German goods on neutral ships.
- Manuel Prado Ugarteche became President of Peru.
- Born: Red Berenson, ice hockey player and coach, in Regina, Saskatchewan; James Galway, flautist, in Belfast, Northern Ireland
- Died: Ernest Schelling, 63, American pianist and composer

== December 9, 1939 (Saturday) ==
- The Winnipeg Blue Bombers edged the Ottawa Rough Riders 8-7 to win the 27th Grey Cup of Canadian football.
- The 1940 NFL draft was held. The Chicago Cardinals selected George Cafego of the University of Tennessee as the first overall pick.
- The German auxiliary cruiser Orion was commissioned.
- Born: Virginia Vestoff, American actress, in New York City, New York (d. 1982 of cancer)

== December 10, 1939 (Sunday) ==
- The 1939 Nobel Prizes were awarded in Stockholm. The recipients were Ernest Lawrence of the United States for Physics, Adolf Butenandt (Germany) and Leopold Ružička (Switzerland) for Chemistry, Gerhard Domagk (Germany) for Physiology or Medicine and Frans Eemil Sillanpää of Finland for Literature. The Peace Prize was not awarded. Nazi Germany forced Butenandt and Domagk to refuse their awards at the time, but they accepted them after the war. Lawrence did not travel to Europe because of the war but accepted his prize on February 29, 1940 at the University of California, Berkeley.
- The first convoy of Canadian troops departed Halifax, Nova Scotia for England.
- The Green Bay Packers beat the New York Giants 27-0 in the NFL Championship Game.

== December 11, 1939 (Monday) ==
- The League of Nations sent the Soviet Union a telegram calling for a cessation of hostilities with Finland and to submit the dispute with Finland to mediation by the League.
- Born: Thomas McGuane, author, in Wyandotte, Michigan

== December 12, 1939 (Tuesday) ==
- The British destroyer HMS Duchess sank in a collision with the battleship Barham off the Mull of Kintyre.
- The Battle of Tolvajärvi was fought, resulting in Finnish victory.
- German submarine U-50 was commissioned.
- Died: Douglas Fairbanks, 56, American actor and filmmaker (heart attack)

== December 13, 1939 (Wednesday) ==
- Battle of the River Plate: In South American waters, the German cruiser Admiral Graf Spee was critically damaged in a battle with the British warships Exeter, Ajax and Achilles.
- Soviet prisoner transport ship Indigirka ran aground off the Japanese coast near Sarufutsu while transporting fishermen with families and prisoners released for war effort - 741 of about 1,500 persons on board perished.

== December 14, 1939 (Thursday) ==
- The Soviet Union was expelled from the League of Nations after it was declared the aggressor in the war with Finland. Of the main powers on the world stage Britain and France were now the only ones left in the League, since Germany, Italy and Japan had already quit and the United States never joined.
- The Norwegian pro-Nazi politician Vidkun Quisling met with Hitler and high-ranking members of the German military in Berlin as the Nazis investigated ways to go about occupying Norway.
- Born: Ernie Davis, American football player, in New Salem-Buffington, Pennsylvania (d. 1963)

== December 15, 1939 (Friday) ==
- The epic historical romance film Gone with the Wind starring Vivien Leigh, Clark Gable, Leslie Howard and Olivia de Havilland premiered at Loew's Grand Theatre in Atlanta.
- The government of Uruguay gave the Admiral Graf Spee 72 hours to leave.
- Nylon yarn was manufactured for the first time.

== December 16, 1939 (Saturday) ==
- The 1st Battle of Summa began.
- German submarine U-64 was commissioned.

== December 17, 1939 (Sunday) ==
- The German cruiser Admiral Graf Spee was scuttled in neutral waters near Montevideo as the time limit to leave port was running out. Captain Hans Langsdorff believed that British reinforcements were nearby and that he had used up too much fuel and ammunition to fight his way back to Germany.
- The decision to occupy Denmark was taken in Berlin.
- The first Canadian troops arrived in Britain.
- Born: Eddie Kendricks, singer-songwriter (The Temptations), in Union Springs, Alabama (d. 1992)

== December 18, 1939 (Monday) ==
- The Battle of the Heligoland Bight was fought in the skies over the Heligoland Bight in northern Germany.
- The Battle of Kunlun Pass began in the Second Sino-Japanese War.
- Adolf Hitler sent Joseph Stalin a telegram on his sixtieth birthday wishing him "good health and a happy future for the peoples of the friendly Soviet Union."
- Born:
  - Alex Bennett, talk radio host, in San Francisco
  - Michael Moorcock, science fiction and fantasy author, in London, England
  - Harold E. Varmus, molecular biologist and Nobel laureate, in Oceanside, New York
- Died: Ernest Lawson, 66, Canadian-American painter

== December 19, 1939 (Tuesday) ==
- The Anglo-French Supreme War Council met for the fourth time and decided to send help to Finland if requested, against the wishes of the neutral Scandinavian nations.
- To avoid capture by the Royal Navy, the German ocean liner SS Columbus (1922) was scuttled by her own crew. 2 people died. The survivors were taken as rescued seamen, but not as PoWs (prisoners of war).
- Died: Reginald F. Nicholson, 87, American naval officer

== December 20, 1939 (Wednesday) ==
- A fundraising rally for the Finnish Relief Fund called "Let's Help Finland" was held at Madison Square Garden in New York. Herbert Hoover made a speech at the event which was also broadcast to the American people.
- Died: Hans Langsdorff, 45, German captain of the Admiral Graf Spee (suicide)

== December 21, 1939 (Thursday) ==
- In the face of strong Finnish resistance, the Soviet Union halted large-scale operations in order to bring in more resources before attempting a new offensive.
- The cantata Zdravitsa (A Toast!) by Sergei Prokofiev was performed for the first time in Moscow.
- German submarine U-62 was commissioned.

== December 22, 1939 (Friday) ==
- The 1st Battle of Summa ended in Finnish victory.
- Many Indian Muslims celebrated a "Day of Deliverance" celebrating the resignation of members of the Indian National Congress from government offices in protest over not being consulted over India's decision to enter the war.
- Two express trains collided in Magdeburg, Germany, killing at least 132 people.
- The animated feature film Gulliver's Travels, loosely based on the Jonathan Swift story of the same name, was released.
- Born: Al Ferrara, baseball player, in Brooklyn, New York (d. 2024)
- Died: Ma Rainey, 53, American blues singer (heart attack)

== December 23, 1939 (Saturday) ==
- The British formed Military Intelligence Section 9 (MI9) to aid resistance fighters, downed airmen, and prisoners of war in Nazi-occupied countries.
- Died: Anthony Fokker, 49, Dutch aviation pioneer and aircraft manufacturer

== December 24, 1939 (Sunday) ==
- Pope Pius XII gave a Christmas address to 25 cardinals in which he offered a five-point program as a basis for negotiating a "just and honorable peace."
- Born: Christiane Schmidtmer, actress and model, in Mannheim, Germany (d. 2003)
- Born: Dean Corll, serial killer, in Fort Wayne, Indiana (d. 1973)

== December 25, 1939 (Monday) ==
- The Battle of Kelja began.

== December 26, 1939 (Tuesday) ==
- The first Royal Australian Air Force squadron, No. 10 Squadron RAAF, arrived in Britain.
- Wawer massacre: 107 Polish civilians murdered by the German occupiers in Wawer, suburb of Warsaw on the night of 26 to 27 December 1939.
- Born: Phil Spector, record producer, in the Bronx, New York (d. 2021)

== December 27, 1939 (Wednesday) ==
- The 7.8 M_{w} Erzincan earthquake shook eastern Turkey with a maximum Mercalli intensity of XII (Extreme). More than 32,000 people were killed and about 100,000 were injured.
- The Battles of Kelja and Taipale ended in Finnish victories.
- Born: John Amos, actor, in Newark, New Jersey (d. 2024)
- Died: Rinaldo Cuneo, 62, American painter

== December 28, 1939 (Thursday) ==
- The German submarine U-30 spotted the British battleship HMS Barham west of the Butt of Lewis in the Outer Hebrides and hit it with a torpedo. Four crew members were killed but the Barham was able to make it back to Liverpool where it underwent six months of repairs.
- The British Minister of Food W.S. Morrison announced that starting January 8, rationing would be expanded to include butter, bacon, ham and sugar.
- Issue #52 of More Fun Comics (cover date February 1940) was published, featuring the first appearance of the Spectre.
- Born: Yehoram Gaon, Israeli actor and singer

== December 29, 1939 (Friday) ==
- The Consolidated B-24 Liberator heavy bomber prototype had its first flight in the United States.
- The historical drama film The Hunchback of Notre Dame was released in the United States.
- Died: Robert Edwin Bush, 84, English cricketer and explorer; Kelly Miller, 76, African-American mathematician, sociologist and writer; Madeleine Pelletier, 65, French physician, feminist and activist

== December 30, 1939 (Saturday) ==
- A passenger train and a troop train collided in Naples, killing about 40.
- An article written by Hermann Göring appeared in the Völkischer Beobachter warning that as soon as Hitler ordered the Luftwaffe to attack Britain "it will make an assault such as world history never has experienced."
- President Roosevelt named Charles Edison United States Secretary of the Navy.
- Born: Felix Pappalardi, rock bassist and producer, in The Bronx, New York (d. 1983)

== December 31, 1939 (Sunday) ==
- New Year's Eve observances in Britain, France and Germany were very subdued due to blackout and noise restrictions. Most celebrations were held in private homes with the windows shuttered.
- German Propaganda Minister Joseph Goebbels made a radio address reviewing the official Nazi version of the events of 1939. No predictions were made for 1940 other than saying that the next year "will be a hard year, and we must be ready for it."
- Generalissimo Francisco Franco made a radio broadcast asking "all Spaniards in this period of depression which follows any war to close the mouths of grumblers and not permit the enemies of the state to take advantage of the situation."
- Japan and the Soviet Union signed an accord on fishing rights in adjacent territorial waters.
- Born: Peter Camejo, author, activist and politician, in New York City (d. 2008)
- Died: Frank Benson, 81, British actor-manager
