= January 1940 =

Month of 1940

| << | January 1940 | | | | | >> |
| Su | Mo | Tu | We | Th | Fr | Sa |
| | 1 | 2 | 3 | 4 | 5 | 6 |
| 7 | 8 | 9 | 10 | 11 | 12 | 13 |
| 14 | 15 | 16 | 17 | 18 | 19 | 20 |
| 21 | 22 | 23 | 24 | 25 | 26 | 27 |
| 28 | 29 | 30 | 31 |

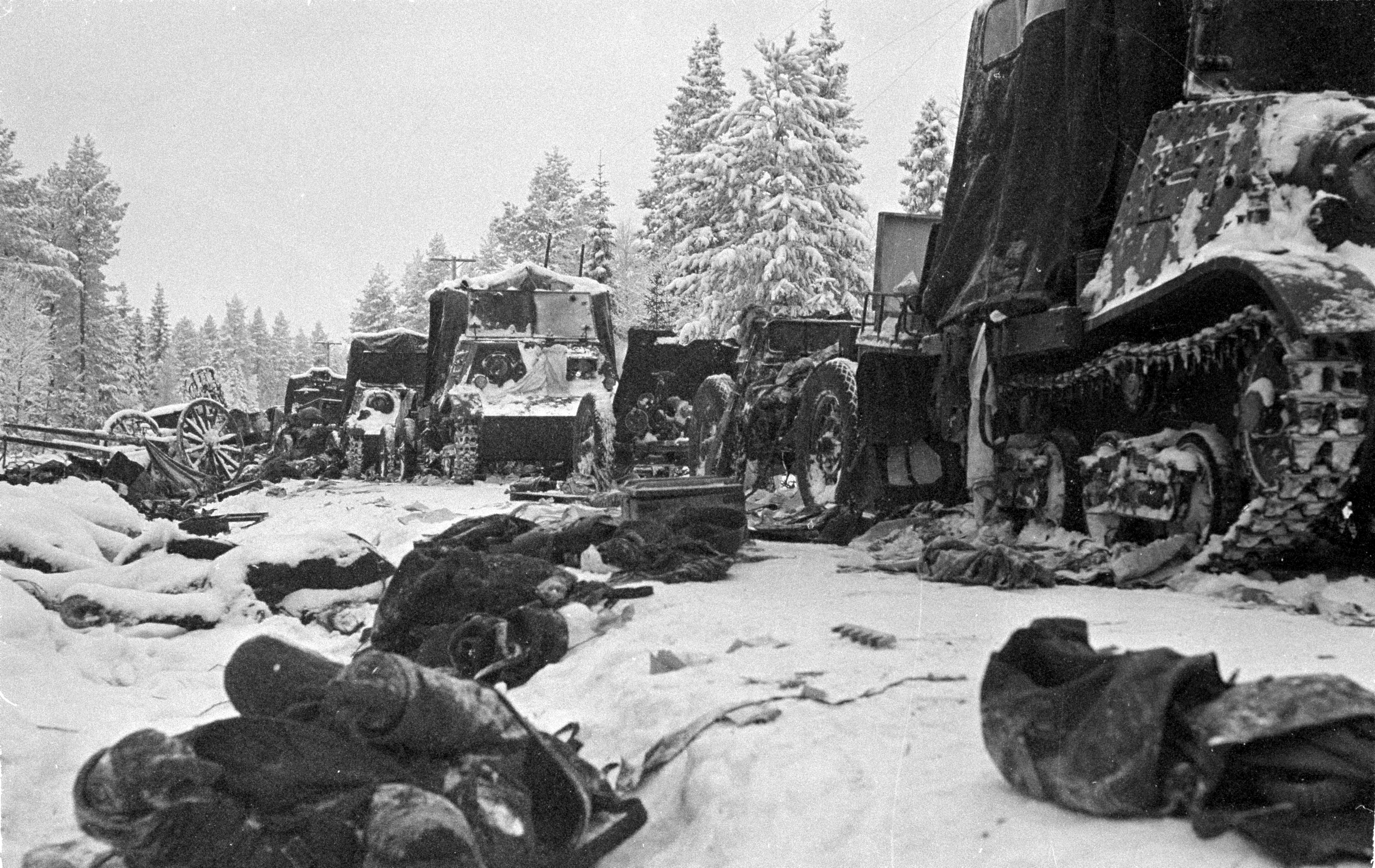
January 8, 1940: Outnumbered Finnish troops defeat the Soviet Red Army in Battle of Suomussalmi.

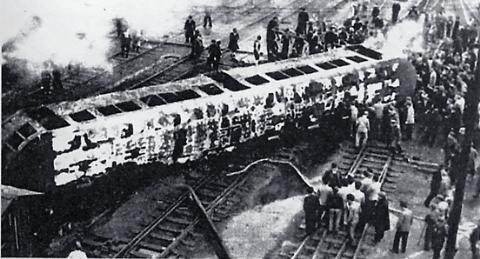
January 29, 1940: Multiple train collision and fire kills 200 people in Japan

The following events occurred in January 1940:

== January 1, 1940 (Monday) ==
- In the Winter War, the Battle of Raate Road began.
- Great Britain increased the age of conscription to 27.
- In U.S. college football, the Texas A&M Aggies, ranked number #1 in the final Associated Press poll of sportswriters edged the #5 ranked Tulane Green Wave 14–13 in the 1940 Sugar Bowl. The #3 ranked USC Trojans beat the #2 Tennessee Volunteers, 14–0, in the 26th Rose Bowl. The #16 Georgia Tech Yellow Jackets upset the #6 Missouri Tigers 21–7 in the 1940 Orange Bowl. The #12 Clemson Tigers beat the #11 Boston College Eagles 6–3 in the 1940 Cotton Bowl Classic.
- Born: Emilio Del Giudice, theoretical physicist, in Naples, Italy (d. 2014); Pangalian Balindong, Filipino politician, Speaker of the Bangsamoro Parliament, in Lanao (d. 2025)
- Died: Ferdo Šišić, 70, Croatian historian

== January 2, 1940 (Tuesday) ==
- The Irish government introduced emergency powers to incarcerate members of the Irish Republican Army without trial.
- Soviet submarine S-2 hit a Swedish naval mine in the Sea of Åland and sank with the loss of all 50 crew.
- Adolf Hitler's traditional New Year's reception of the diplomatic corps in the Reich Chancellory was canceled due to the war.
- Born: Jim Bakker, televangelist, in Muskegon, Michigan

== January 3, 1940 (Wednesday) ==
- U.S. President Franklin D. Roosevelt gave the 1940 State of the Union Address to Congress. "In previous messages to the Congress I have repeatedly warned that, whether we like it or not, the daily lives of American citizens will, of necessity, feel the shock of events on other continents. This is no longer mere theory; because it has been definitely proved to us by the facts of yesterday and today," the president said. He asked the Congress to approve increased national defense spending "based not on panic but on common sense" and "to levy sufficient additional taxes" to help pay for it.
- The pro-Nazi English socialite Unity Mitford, who was in Germany when the war began, arrived at the English port of Folkestone under heavy police guard and was brought ashore on a stretcher. Her father Lord Redesdale told a reporter that his daughter was very ill.
- Born: Leo de Berardinis, stage actor and theatre director, in Gioi, Italy (d. 2008)

== January 4, 1940 (Thursday) ==
- Hermann Göring was appointed head of the German war economy. Walther Funk was made Executive Vice President for the economy.
- The Polish government-in-exile reached an agreement with French authorities to establish Polish military units in France.
- Born: Brian Josephson, theoretical physicist and Nobel laureate, in Cardiff, Wales; Charles Palmer-Tomkinson, landowner and Olympic skier, in Hampshire, England; Gao Xingjian, novelist, playwright, critic and Nobel laureate, in Ganzhou, China
- Died: Flora Finch, 72, English-born film actress and comedian

== January 5, 1940 (Friday) ==
- Oliver Stanley took over from Leslie Hore-Belisha as Secretary of State for War.
- Hollywood actors William Powell and Diana Lewis were married on a ranch near Las Vegas, Nevada. The marriage was a surprise to most people as few even knew they were a couple.

== January 6, 1940 (Saturday) ==
- Finnish pilot Jorma Sarvanto and a colleague shot down seven bombers of a Soviet formation in a single engagement.
- Duke Indoor Stadium (now Cameron Indoor Stadium) opened on the West Campus of Duke University in Durham, North Carolina.
- Born: Penny Lernoux, journalist and author, in California (d. 1989)
- Died: George H. Himes, 95, American pioneer

== January 7, 1940 (Sunday) ==
- The Battle of Raate Road ended in Finnish victory.
- German documents record an attack on this date by the German First Minesweeper Flotilla on an unidentified submarine near Heligoland. Since the British submarine Seahorse was on patrol at the time but never returned, it is thought to have been sunk in this attack.
- The British submarine Undine was attacked and badly damaged near Heligoland by three German minesweepers. Early the next day the submarine was scuttled and the crew taken prisoner.

== January 8, 1940 (Monday) ==
- The Battle of Suomussalmi ended in Finnish victory. Two Soviet divisions were encircled and destroyed.
- The British government introduced rationing for butter, bacon, ham and sugar.
- Britain, France and Turkey signed a trade agreement.

== January 9, 1940 (Tuesday) ==
- The British submarine Starfish was sunk in the Heligoland Bight by German minesweeper trawlers.
- Born: Miguel Ángel Rodríguez, President of Costa Rica, in San José, Costa Rica

== January 10, 1940 (Wednesday) ==
- Mechelen incident: A German aircraft with an officer on board carrying plans for Fall Gelb, the German invasion of the Low Countries, crash-landed in neutral Belgium. The plans fell into the hands of Belgian intelligence.

== January 11, 1940 (Thursday) ==
- The Battle of Kunlun Pass ended with the Chinese holding the pass.
- The Sergei Prokofiev ballet Romeo and Juliet made its Russian debut at the Korov Theatre in Leningrad amid wartime blackout conditions.
- The screwball comedy film His Girl Friday was released.

== January 12, 1940 (Friday) ==
- The Danish tanker Danmark was torpedoed and sunk by the German submarine U-23 off the Orkney Islands. The crew of 40 escaped safely.
- NBC initiated its first network television programming. A play called Meet the Wife was broadcast to a station in Schenectady, New York.
- The horror science fiction film The Invisible Man Returns was released.
- Born: Ronald Shannon Jackson, jazz drummer, in Fort Worth, Texas (d. 2013)
- Died: Nikolay Strunnikov, 53, Russian speed skater and cyclist

== January 13, 1940 (Saturday) ==
- Belgium and the Netherlands ordered partial mobilization in response to the Mechelen Incident.
- The Finnish escort Aura II was sunk by its own depth charge trying to attack a Soviet submarine in the Sea of Åland.

== January 14, 1940 (Sunday) ==
- Hitler ordered that no one would be allowed to know more than he did about any secret matter.
- FBI agents arrested 17 members of the Christian Front for planning a vast plot to overthrow the U.S. government and establish a fascist dictatorship. The charges were described as "a bit fantastic" by the Attorney General, Robert Jackson, and eventually dropped.
- The reigning NFL champion Green Bay Packers beat an all-star team 16–7 in the National Football League All-Star Game at Gilmore Stadium in Los Angeles.
- Born: Julian Bond, civil rights leader and politician, in Nashville, Tennessee (d. 2015)
- Died: Felician Myrbach, 86, Austrian painter, graphic designer and illustrator

== January 15, 1940 (Monday) ==
- The British government took over control of the country's meat industry.
- Belgium protested to Germany over the Mechelen incident.
- Born: Tommy Gilbert, professional wrestler, in Lexington, Tennessee (d. 2015)

== January 16, 1940 (Tuesday) ==
- Mitsumasa Yonai replaced Nobuyuki Abe as Prime Minister of Japan.
- British Parliament met for the first time in the New Year. Prime Minister Neville Chamberlain made a speech on the general war situation which concluded, "At the moment there is a lull in the operations of war, but at any time that lull may be sharply broken, and events may occur within a few weeks or even a few hours which will reshape the history of the world. We, in this country, hope, as do the peoples of every nation, that the just and lasting peace which we are seeking will not be long delayed. On the other hand, it may well be that the war is about to enter upon a more acute phase. If that should prove to be the case, we are ready for it, and in common with our Allies we will spare no effort and no sacrifice that may be necessary to secure the victory on which we are determined."
- Born: Franz Müntefering, Vice-Chancellor of Germany, in Neheim, Germany
- Died: Elizabeth Yeats, Irish publisher and educator (b. 1868)

== January 17, 1940 (Wednesday) ==
- Europe was struck by a cold wave. In Finland the mercury dipped as low as −45 degrees Celsius, while in England the River Thames froze up for the first time since 1888.
- Born: Tabaré Vázquez, President of Uruguay, in Montevideo (d. 2020)

== January 18, 1940 (Thursday) ==
- Palmiry massacre: 255 Jews in Warsaw were arrested at random. Over the next week they would be taken to the Palmiry Forest outside the city and shot dead.
- By a vote of 44 to 10, the provincial legislature of Ontario passed a motion introduced by Premier Mitchell Hepburn criticizing Canadian Prime Minister William Lyon Mackenzie King for making "so little effort to prosecute Canada's duty in the war in the vigorous manner in which the people of Canada desire to see."
- German submarine U-63 was commissioned.
- Died: Kazimierz Przerwa-Tetmajer, 74, Polish poet and writer

== January 19, 1940 (Friday) ==
- The British destroyer Grenville struck a mine in the Thames Estuary and sank. 77 lives were lost but 108 were rescued.
- Born: Mike Reid, comedian and actor, in London, England (d. 2007)
- Died: William Borah, 74, American politician

== January 20, 1940 (Saturday) ==
- The Soviets bombed Turku and Hanko, starting serious fires there.
- During the Winter Offensive in the Second Sino-Japanese War, Chinese troops captured Licheng.
- Winston Churchill gave an address over the radio referred to as the "House of Many Mansions" speech, with neutral nations its primary subject. Churchill explained that there was "no chance of a speedy end" to the war "except through united action", and asked listeners to consider what would happen if neutral nations "were with one spontaneous impulse to do their duty in accordance with the Covenant of the League, and were to stand together with the British and French Empires against aggression and wrong?" Churchill concluded, "The day will come when the joybells will ring again throughout Europe, and when victorious nations, masters not only of their foes but of themselves, will plan and build in justice, in tradition, and in freedom a house of many mansions where there will be room for all."
- London recorded a temperature of 12 degrees Fahrenheit - the city's coldest day since 1881.
- A temperature of −30.1 °C (−22.2 °F) was recorded in the Valley of the Lesse in Rochefort, Belgium - the country's coldest temperature ever.
- Born: Carol Heiss, figure skater and actor, in New York City

== January 21, 1940 (Sunday) ==
- The British destroyer Exmouth was sunk in the Moray Firth with the loss of all hands by the German submarine U-22.
- The Soviets bombed Oulu, and the Finns responded by bombing Kronstadt.
- The Italian ocean liner Orazio caught on fire and sank off Toulon following an engine room explosion. 106 of the 633 aboard were killed.
- Born: Jeremy Jacobs, businessman and owner of the Boston Bruins hockey team, in Buffalo, New York; Jack Nicklaus, golfer, in Upper Arlington, Ohio
- Died: Prince Christopher of Greece and Denmark, 51

== January 22, 1940 (Monday) ==
- Pope Pius XII made a radio broadcast condemning Germany's actions in Poland.
- The United States Treasury published a list of Americans who made salaries of more than $75,000 in 1938. The list revealed that Claudette Colbert was the highest-paid star in Hollywood that year with a salary of $301,944, followed by Warner Baxter who made $279,807.
- Born: John Hurt, actor, in Chesterfield, England (d. 2017)

== January 23, 1940 (Tuesday) ==
- Former South African Prime Minister J. B. M. Hertzog introduced a motion in the House of Assembly that "the time has arrived that the war with Germany should be ended and that peace be restored." The motion's wording was ambiguous as to whether it was advocating a general or a separate peace.
- Britain lowered the speed limit at night in populated areas to 20 miles per hour (32 km/h) due to the sharp increase in the rate of auto accidents during blackouts.
- Oliver Stanley announced in the House of Commons that kilts would not be issued to members of Scottish regiments except to pipers and drummers, for reasons connected to the possible use of poison gas by the enemy.

== January 24, 1940 (Wednesday) ==
- The German government ordered the registration of all Jewish-owned property in Poland.
- The drama film The Grapes of Wrath premiered in New York City.
- Born: Joachim Gauck, President of Germany, in Rostock
- Died: John Doogan, 86, Irish recipient of the Victoria Cross; Harry Piers, 69, Canadian historian

== January 25, 1940 (Thursday) ==
- France announced a new decree providing sentences of up to two years in prison and fines up to 5,000 francs for "false assertions" presented as "personal opinions" that correspond to "enemy propaganda and which, expressed publicly, indicate the marked intention of their authors to injure national defense by attacking the morale of the army and population".
- Died: John Calvin Stevens, 84, American architect

== January 26, 1940 (Friday) ==
- The passenger ship Durham Castle struck a mine off Cromarty, Scotland and sank.
- The 1911 trade treaty between the United States and Japan expired.
- The Nazis warned that listening to foreign radio was punishable by death.
- Charles de Gaulle issued a memo to his superiors stating, "We began the war with five million soldiers yet our aerial forces are only now being equipped and our armoured vehicles are too weak and too few in number."
- U-boat captains were permitted from now on to make submerged attacks without warning on certain merchant vessels (though not on Spanish, Russian, Japanese or American ships) east of Scotland, in the Bristol Channel and in the English Channel.
- American actor Norman Kerry joined the French Foreign Legion.

== January 27, 1940 (Saturday) ==
- Hertzog's peace resolution was defeated, 81 to 59.
- The German government demanded at least 1 million industrial and rural workers be provided from Nazi-occupied Poland to work assignments in the Reich.
- The writ was issued for a new Canadian federal election to be held March 26.
- Born: James Cromwell, actor, in Los Angeles, California; Brian O'Leary, scientist, author and astronaut, in Boston, Massachusetts (d. 2011)
- Died: Isaac Babel, 45, Ukrainian writer (executed); Léon Frédéric, 83, Belgian Symbolist painter

== January 28, 1940 (Sunday) ==
- Finnish troops eliminated Soviet forces encircled in the Pieni-Kelivaara pocket on the north shore of Lake Ladoga.
- Chinese troops captured Lucheng, Shanxi.
- A new musical quiz show called Beat the Band premiered on NBC Radio. The audience sent in riddles to the house band in which the answer was always the title of a song. Listeners earned $10 if their question was used and an additional $10 if their question stumped the band.
- Born: Carlos Slim, businessman, in Mexico City, Mexico

== January 29, 1940 (Monday) ==
- French Prime Minister Édouard Daladier made a radio address to the people of France titled "The Nazis' Aim is Slavery". "For us, there is more to do than merely win the war," Daladier said. "We shall win it, but we must also win a victory far greater than that of arms. In this world of masters and slaves, which those madmen who rule at Berlin are seeking to forge, we must also save liberty and human dignity."
- A fire at Ajikawaguchi Station in Osaka, Japan killed almost 200 people.
- Actress Jill Esmond won a divorce from her husband Laurence Olivier. Vivien Leigh was named as co-respondent and Olivier did not contest the proceedings.
- Born: Katharine Ross, actress, in Los Angeles, California

== January 30, 1940 (Tuesday) ==
- Adolf Hitler gave a speech at the Berlin Sportpalast on the seventh anniversary of the Nazis taking power, his first formal address since narrowly avoiding the attempt on his life in November. The location of the speech was kept secret up until a few hours before it began. Hitler claimed that Britain and France "wanted war" and he vowed that they would "get their fight".
- Heinrich Himmler issued a statement clarifying his "procreation" order of last October 28. The "worst misunderstanding", Himmler wrote, was that the order encouraged SS men to approach the wives of serving soldiers.
- The German submarine U-15 sank in the North Sea in the Hoofden after it was accidentally rammed by the German torpedo boat Iltis.
- The German submarine U-55 was depth charged, shelled and sunk off the Shetland Islands by Allied convoy OA-80G.
- Born: Mitch Murray, songwriter and record producer, in Hove, England

== January 31, 1940 (Wednesday) ==
- Britain secretly approached neutral Italy about purchasing badly needed fighter planes for the war effort. Germany would ensure that no such deal would be made.
- Died: Candelaria of San José, 76, Venezuelan founder of the Hermanas Carmelitas de Madre Candelaria; René Schickele, 56, German-French writer, essayist and translator
