= February 1940 =

Month of 1940

<<	February 1940					>>
Su	Mo	Tu	We	Th	Fr	Sa
				1	2	3
4	5	6	7	8	9	10
11	12	13	14	15	16	17
18	19	20	21	22	23	24
25	26	27	28	29

The following events occurred in February 1940:

== February 1, 1940 (Thursday) ==
- The 2nd Battle of Summa began. Soviet forces launched an all-out assault on the Karelian Isthmus.
- Japan passed a massive budget devoting unprecedented sums to weapons and training.
- Born:
  - Mark Fleischman, American businessman and nightclub owner, in New York City (d. 2022)
  - Ajmer Singh, sprinter, in Kup Kalan, Sangrur district, Punjab (d. 2010)
- Died: Philip Francis Nowlan, 51, American science fiction writer and creator of Buck Rogers

== February 2, 1940 (Friday) ==
- The members of the Balkan Pact met in Belgrade.
- In Prague, Nazi authorities changed the name of Wilson railway station (named for Woodrow Wilson) to "Main station", and Masaryk station to "Prague-Hibernia station".
- Born: David Jason, actor, in Edmonton, London, England
- Died: Vsevolod Meyerhold, 65, Russian theatre director (executed by firing squad); Yefim Yevdokimov, 59, Soviet politician and member of the Cheka (executed)

== February 3, 1940 (Saturday) ==
- A German plane crashed on English soil for the first time in the war when a Heinkel He 111 was shot down near Whitby. Flight Lieutenant Peter Townsend of 43 Squadron was credited with the air victory.
- Born: Fran Tarkenton, NFL quarterback and television personality, in Richmond, Virginia

== February 4, 1940 (Sunday) ==
- After two days of talks, the Balkan Pact issued a 7-point communiqué indicating it would remain neutral in the conflict.
- The United States and Saudi Arabia established full diplomatic relations for the first time when Bert Fish presented his credentials as American Envoy Extraordinary and Minister Plenipotentiary.
- Born: George A. Romero, filmmaker, in the Bronx, New York (d. 2017)
- Died: Samuel M. Vauclain, 83, American engineer and inventor; Nikolai Yezhov, Soviet police official (executed)

== February 5, 1940 (Monday) ==
- The Anglo-French Supreme War Council met again in Paris with Neville Chamberlain and Winston Churchill in attendance. Franco-British plans for intervention in the Winter War were discussed.
- The German Submarine U-41 (1939) sunk south of Ireland. All 49 of the crew went down with it.
- Born: H. R. Giger, surrealist artist, in Chur, Switzerland (d. 2014)

== February 6, 1940 (Tuesday) ==
- The "Careless Talk Costs Lives" propaganda campaign began in Britain, aimed at preventing war gossip.
- Born: Tom Brokaw, television journalist and author, in Webster, South Dakota; Jimmy Tarbuck, comedian, in Liverpool, England

== February 7, 1940 (Wednesday) ==
- The Manstein Plan was tested in a war game at Koblenz.
- The Walt Disney animated film Pinocchio premiered at the Center Theater in New York City.
- Peter Barnes and James McCormack of the Irish Republican Army were hanged in Birmingham on charges of being involved in last August's bomb explosion in Coventry.
- Born: Tony Tan, Singaporean academic and politician, 7th President of Singapore

== February 8, 1940 (Thursday) ==
- An official Nazi decree established Łódź Ghetto.
- Neville Chamberlain made a speech in Parliament updating the House on the general international situation, saying there was "no reason to be dissatisfied" with the early progress of the war. Chamberlain also praised the Finnish people for their "heroic struggle" that "has evoked the admiration of the world" and said that "further aid is now on its way."
- The adventure film Swiss Family Robinson, the first feature-length adaptation of the Johann David Wyss novel of the same name, was released.
- Born: Ted Koppel, broadcast journalist, in Nelson, Lancashire, England

== February 9, 1940 (Friday) ==
- The French Chamber of Deputies met for a secret session. Prime Minister Édouard Daladier had resisted holding the meeting behind closed doors out of concern that its secrecy would have a negative effect on national morale.
- U.S. President Franklin D. Roosevelt announced that he was sending Undersecretary of State Sumner Welles to the principal Western European capitals on a fact-finding mission. In private Roosevelt conceded that the chances of finding a peaceful solution to the war were remote.
- Joe Louis defeated Arturo Godoy by split decision at Madison Square Garden in New York City to retain the world heavyweight boxing title.
- The comedy-Western film My Little Chickadee starring Mae West and W. C. Fields was released.
- Born: Brian Bennett, drummer for The Shadows, in Palmers Green, North London, England; J. M. Coetzee, novelist and Nobel laureate, in Cape Town, South Africa; Seamus Deane, poet, novelist and critic, in Derry, Northern Ireland (d. 2021)
- Died: William Dodd, 70, American historian, author and diplomat

== February 10, 1940 (Saturday) ==
- Soviet troops finally began breaking through the Mannerheim Line.
- First mass deportation of Poles from Soviet-occupied territories to prison and labour camps in Siberia/northern Russia
- To mark the 2,600th anniversary of the traditional founding date of Japan, Pope Pius XII sent Emperor Hirohito a telegram that said in part: "We ask God that may you cease hostilities and that through Divine aid may the Japanese people and their sovereigns attain greater glory and happy years."
- Czech Jews were ordered to close their shops and cease economic activity.
- From the south portico of the White House, U.S. President Franklin D. Roosevelt confronted a gathering of 4,500 members of the American Youth Congress, which had recently passed a resolution declaring that granting aid to Finland was an "attempt to force America into the imperialistic war" against the Soviet Union. Roosevelt told them that it was "a grand thing" for youth to be interested enough in government to come to Washington, but offered "some words of warning or perhaps I should say of suggestion ... do not as a group pass resolutions on subjects which you have not thought through and on which you cannot possibly have complete knowledge." The president continued, "That American sympathy is ninety-eight per cent with the Finns in their effort to stave off invasion of their own soil is by now axiomatic. That America wants to help them by lending or giving money to them to save their own lives is also axiomatic today. That the Soviet Union would, because of this, declare war on the United States is about the silliest thought that I have ever heard advanced in the fifty-eight years of my life. That we are going to war ourselves with the Soviet Union is an equally silly thought." The organization responded by booing the president, but the event was politically useful to Roosevelt in that it served as a rejoinder to accusations from his opponents that he was sympathetic to communism.
- The biographical film Young Tom Edison starring Mickey Rooney had a special preview in Port Huron, Michigan, the place where Thomas Edison spent his childhood.
- Tom and Jerry made their debut in the short film Puss Gets the Boot, under their original names of Jasper and Jinx.

== February 11, 1940 (Sunday) ==
- The German–Soviet Commercial Agreement was signed.
- The unfinished German cruiser Lützow was sold to the Soviet Navy.
- General elections were held in Costa Rica. Rafael Ángel Calderón Guardia was elected president.
- Died: John Buchan, 64, Scottish novelist, historian and 15th Governor General of Canada

== February 12, 1940 (Monday) ==
- German submarine U-33 was sunk in the Firth of Clyde by the minesweeper Gleaner. 25 of the crew perished but there were 17 survivors, one of whom had three Enigma machine rotors in his pockets which were sent to Alan Turing at the Government Code and Cyper School for study.
- The Finnish cabinet authorized the government to seek peace terms with Moscow.
- The first troops from Australia and New Zealand arrived in Egypt.
- An official Nazi decree deprived industrialist Fritz Thyssen and his wife, living in Switzerland since November, of their German citizenship.
- The U.S. Supreme Court decided Chambers v. Florida, an important case dealing with the admissibility of coerced confessions.
- The radio serial The Adventures of Superman, adapted from the comic book character Superman, premiered as a syndicated show.
- Born: Ralph Bates, actor, in Bristol, England (d. 1991); Richard Lynch, actor, in Brooklyn, New York (d. 2012)

== February 13, 1940 (Tuesday) ==
- Finland asked Sweden to provide troops to fight against the Soviet Union, but Sweden refused out of fear that both Britain and Germany would respond by invading Sweden.
- By a vote of 49 to 27 the United States Senate passed the Roosevelt Administration's bill to provide additional government loans to Finland, China and other countries. The bill went on to the House.

== February 14, 1940 (Wednesday) ==
- Under-Secretary of State for the Home Department Osbert Peake announced in Parliament that a general license had been granted for British subjects to volunteer for service with the Finnish military.
- An authorized Nazi spokesman said that U-boats had a "theoretical right" to attack United States shipping en route to Allied ports.
- The Manstein Plan was tested again in a war game at Mayen. Heinz Guderian concluded that the plan was viable, but Franz Halder did not share Guderian's confidence that panzers could cross the Meuse on their own without waiting for infantry support. This debate was never resolved except for an agreement that panzer commanders would be authorized to attempt the crossing on their own, but if they failed Army Group A would switch to the infantry option.

== February 15, 1940 (Thursday) ==
- The 2nd Battle of Summa ended in victory for the Soviets, who overran the Mannerheim Line. That night the Finnish Commander-in-Chief Carl Gustaf Emil Mannerheim ordered the II Army Corps to withdraw from the line.
- Bogdan Filov replaced Georgi Kyoseivanov as Prime Minister of Bulgaria.
- James Roosevelt, the eldest son of the U.S. president, filed for divorce from his wife Betsey Cushing.
- More than 1100 Jews were deported from the German city of Stettin to the Lublin region of the General Government.
- German submarine U-65 was commissioned.
- Superman #4 was published, marking the first appearance of the villain Lex Luthor.
- Born: Don Shows, multi-sport athlete and coach, in Ruston, Louisiana (d. 2014)
- Died: R. E. B. Crompton, 94, British electrical engineer, industrialist and inventor

== February 16, 1940 (Friday) ==
- Altmark Incident: Forces of the Royal Navy seized the German steamer Altmark in Norwegian waters and freed 299 prisoners of war. Norway protested the action as a violation of its national sovereignty.
- In Egypt, the British Army created the 7th Armoured Division, later to be famous as the "Desert Rats".

== February 17, 1940 (Saturday) ==
- Erich von Manstein presented the Manstein Plan to Hitler, detailing the war plan for the German invasion of France and the Low Countries. Hitler was impressed by the plan.
- Germany accused Britain of "piracy, murder and gangsterism" over the Altmark incident and also lodged a protest with Norway demanding compensation for failing to protect the German ship within Norwegian territorial waters. Norway in turn protested to Britain for infringing on the country's neutrality.
- Born: Gene Pitney, singer-songwriter, in Hartford, Connecticut (d. 2006)

== February 18, 1940 (Sunday) ==
- The British destroyer HMS Daring was sunk by the German submarine U-23 east of the Orkney Islands while escorting Allied convoy HN12. 157 perished.
- The Finns destroyed a pocket of Soviet troops north of Lake Ladoga, killing 1,000 and taking 250 prisoner.
- Born:
  - Fabrizio De André, singer-songwriter, in Genoa, Italy (d. 1999)
  - Prue Leith, South African restaurateur, chef, and television presenter, in Cape Town

== February 19, 1940 (Monday) ==
- The Soviet 18th Division attacked across the frozen Lake Suvanto, but was repulsed by Finnish defenders after taking almost 1,000 fatalities.
- Born: Smokey Robinson, singer, songwriter, record producer and executive, in Detroit, Michigan
- Died: Count Aage of Rosenborg, 52, Danish prince and officer of the French Foreign Legion

== February 20, 1940 (Tuesday) ==
- Sam H. Jones defeated Earl K. Long in the Louisiana gubernatorial election, sweeping the old political machine created by Huey Long out of power.
- German submarine U-54 went missing in the North Sea. Its fate remains unknown but it probably struck a naval mine.
- Born: Jimmy Greaves, footballer, in Manor Park, London, England (d. 2021)

== February 21, 1940 (Wednesday) ==
- Hitler authorized Operation Weserübung, the invasion of Norway.
- Concentration Camps Inspectorate head Richard Glücks recommended a location for a "quarantine" camp in Poland. The site was a former Austro-Hungarian cavalry barracks near the town of Oświęcim, known in German as Auschwitz.
- The results of a Gallup poll were published asking Americans, "If it appears that Germany is defeating England and France, should the United States declare war on Germany and send our army and navy to Europe to fight?" 77% said no and 23% said yes, not counting the 7% who expressed no opinion.
- Born: Peter Gethin, racing driver, in Ewell, Surrey, England (d. 2011); Akihiko Kumashiro, politician, in Okayama, Japan

== February 22, 1940 (Thursday) ==
- The Kriegsmarine launched Operation Wikinger, targeting British fishing vessels suspected of reporting the movements of German warships. En route, the destroyer flotilla was mistakenly bombed by a Heinkel He 111, which led to the sinking of the Leberecht Maass and killing 280 aboard. The Max Schultz hit a naval mine attempting a rescue effort and also sank with the loss of all 308 crew.
- The Soviets occupied islands in the Gulf of Finland.
- 12 people were injured in the West End of London by IRA bomb explosions. This was the last important event in the S-Plan campaign.
- The new five-year old Dalai Lama was enthroned in Tibet.
- Born: Judy Cornwell, actress, in Hammersmith, London, England; Billy Name, photographer, filmmaker and lighting designer, in Poughkeepsie, New York (d. 2016); Chet Walker, basketball player, in Benton Harbor, Michigan (d. 2024)
- Died: Hans von Gronau, 89, Prussian World War I general

== February 23, 1940 (Friday) ==
- The German submarine U-53 was sunk by depth charges west of the Orkney Islands.
- The Lord Mayor of London gave a luncheon party at the Guildhall to officers and ratings of the Exeter and Ajax to celebrate their victory at the Battle of the River Plate. Huge crowds turned out to cheer them.
- Born: Peter Fonda, actor, in New York City (d. 2019)
- Died: Yang Jingyu, 35, Chinese Communist and political commissar (killed in action against the Japanese)

== February 24, 1940 (Saturday) ==
- Hitler made a speech in Munich on the 20th anniversary of the founding of the Nazi Party in which he declared that Germany must be and would be victorious.
- Speaking in his home city of Birmingham in an address broadcast to the United States, Neville Chamberlain outlined Britain's aims: the independence of the Poles and Czechs, and "tangible evidence to satisfy us that pledges and assurances when they are given will be fulfilled ... Therefore, it is for Germany to take the next step and to show us conclusively that she has abandoned that thesis that might is right."
- The Manstein Plan was fully adopted by a new OKW directive.
- Born: Pete Duel, actor, in Rochester, New York (d. 1971); Denis Law, footballer, in Aberdeen, Scotland; Princess Maria Gabriella of Savoy, in Naples, Italy (d. 2025)
- Died: Elsbeth Schragmüller, 52, German World War I spy (bone tuberculosis)

== February 25, 1940 (Sunday) ==
- German submarine U-63 was sunk in the North Sea by three destroyers and a submarine from Allied convoy HN-14. 24 of the 25 crew survived and were captured.
- The first squadron of the Royal Canadian Air Force arrived in Britain.
- The first hockey game televised in North America was broadcast on W2XBS from Madison Square Garden between the New York Rangers and Montreal Canadiens.
- Born: Ron Santo, baseball player, in Seattle, Washington (d. 2010)

== February 26, 1940 (Monday) ==
- The large passenger liner RMS Queen Elizabeth left Clydebank on a secret maiden voyage to New York for her final fitting. The British generated false intelligence to make the Germans believe that the ship's destination was Southampton.
- In Rome, U.S. Undersecretary of State Sumner Welles had his first day of meetings with European leaders during his fact-finding mission. Welles went to the Palazzo Chigi where he found Count Ciano to be very hostile to Germany. They then went together to the Palazzo Venezia where Welles found Mussolini to be hardly better disposed towards Britain and France. Welles later recounted being "profoundly shocked" at Mussolini's appearance, finding him looking old, slow and tired in contrast to the vital-looking Mussolini seen in photographs and newsreels.
- Died: Michael Hainisch, 81, 2nd President of Austria

== February 27, 1940 (Tuesday) ==
- Soviet forces launched a pincer movement aimed at the city of Viipuri.
- Norway and Sweden refused to allow British and French troops to cross through their territory to aid Finland.
- Martin Kamen and Sam Ruben discovered Carbon-14 at the University of California, Berkeley.
- The Ehrenpokal der Luftwaffe (Honor Goblet of the Luftwaffe) was established by Hermann Göring.
- Born: Howard Hesseman, actor, in Lebanon, Oregon (d. 2022)
- Died: Peter Behrens, 71, German architect and designer

== February 28, 1940 (Wednesday) ==
- The Land Transfers Regulations were published, dividing Mandatory Palestine into zones of varying land restrictions. The regulations restricted the registry of land by Jews.
- Born: Mario Andretti, racing driver, in Montona, Italy (present-day Motovun, Croatia); Joe South, singer-songwriter, in Atlanta, Georgia (d. 2012)

== February 29, 1940 (Thursday) ==
- Hitler issued a secret directive to all Nazi officials who were to be meeting with Sumner Welles. They were told to maintain the narrative that Britain and France had started the war and were determined to destroy Germany, so Germany had no choice but to continue fighting.
- The 12th Academy Awards were held in Los Angeles, hosted by Bob Hope for the first of what would be nineteen times. Gone With the Wind won eight awards including Best Picture. Hattie McDaniel became the first African-American to win an Oscar when she was named Best Supporting Actress. The Los Angeles Times published the names of the winners in its 8:45 p.m. edition, so most of the attendees already knew the results ahead of time. The academy would respond by starting a tradition the following year in which the winners were not revealed until the ceremony itself when sealed envelopes were opened.
- Born: Yoshio Harada, actor, in Tokyo, Japan (d. 2011)
- Died: E. F. Benson, 72, English novelist
