= 4th Rifle Division (Soviet Union) =

- Active: 1919–1942; 1943–1945; 1955–1957
- Country: Soviet Union
- Branch: Red Army
- Type: Infantry
- Size: Division
- Engagements: Russian Civil War: Defence of Petrograd; Polish-Soviet War: Battle of Warsaw (1920); Soviet invasion of Poland; Winter War: Battle of Kelja; World War II: Barvinkove-Losowaja Operation; Battle of Voronezh (1942); Bryansk Offensive; Gomel-Rechitsa Offensive; Lublin-Brest Offensive; Warsaw-Poznan Offensive; Berlin Offensive
- Decorations: Order of the Red Banner (3rd formation); Order of Suvorov 2nd class (2nd formation)
- Battle honours: Smolensk (1st formation) On behalf of the German Proletariat (1st formation); Bezhitsa (2nd formation) Vitebsk (3rd formation)

Commanders
- Notable commanders: Ivan Rosly Vladimir Stenin Nikolai Zaiyulev

The 4th Rifle Division was an infantry division of the Soviet Union's Red Army, formed three times. It was first formed in 1919 from the remnants of the Lithuanian Rifle Division and fought in the Defence of Petrograd during the Russian Civil War. The division then fought in the Polish–Soviet War.

In 1939, the division fought in the Soviet invasion of Poland. It fought in the Winter War from December 1939 and suffered heavy losses in the Battle of Kelja. After Operation Barbarossa, the division fought in the Barvinkove-Losowaja Operation and the 1942 Battle of Voronezh. It suffered heavy losses at Voronezh and was disbanded in November 1942.

The division re-formed in 1943 and fought in the Bryansk Offensive, Gomel-Rechitsa Offensive, Lublin–Brest Offensive, Warsaw-Poznan Offensive and Berlin Offensive. It was disbanded in the summer of 1945. The division was re-formed a third time from the 160th Rifle Division and inherited that division's honorifics and awards. It became the 4th Motor Rifle Division in 1957 and disbanded in 1959.

== History ==
=== First formation ===
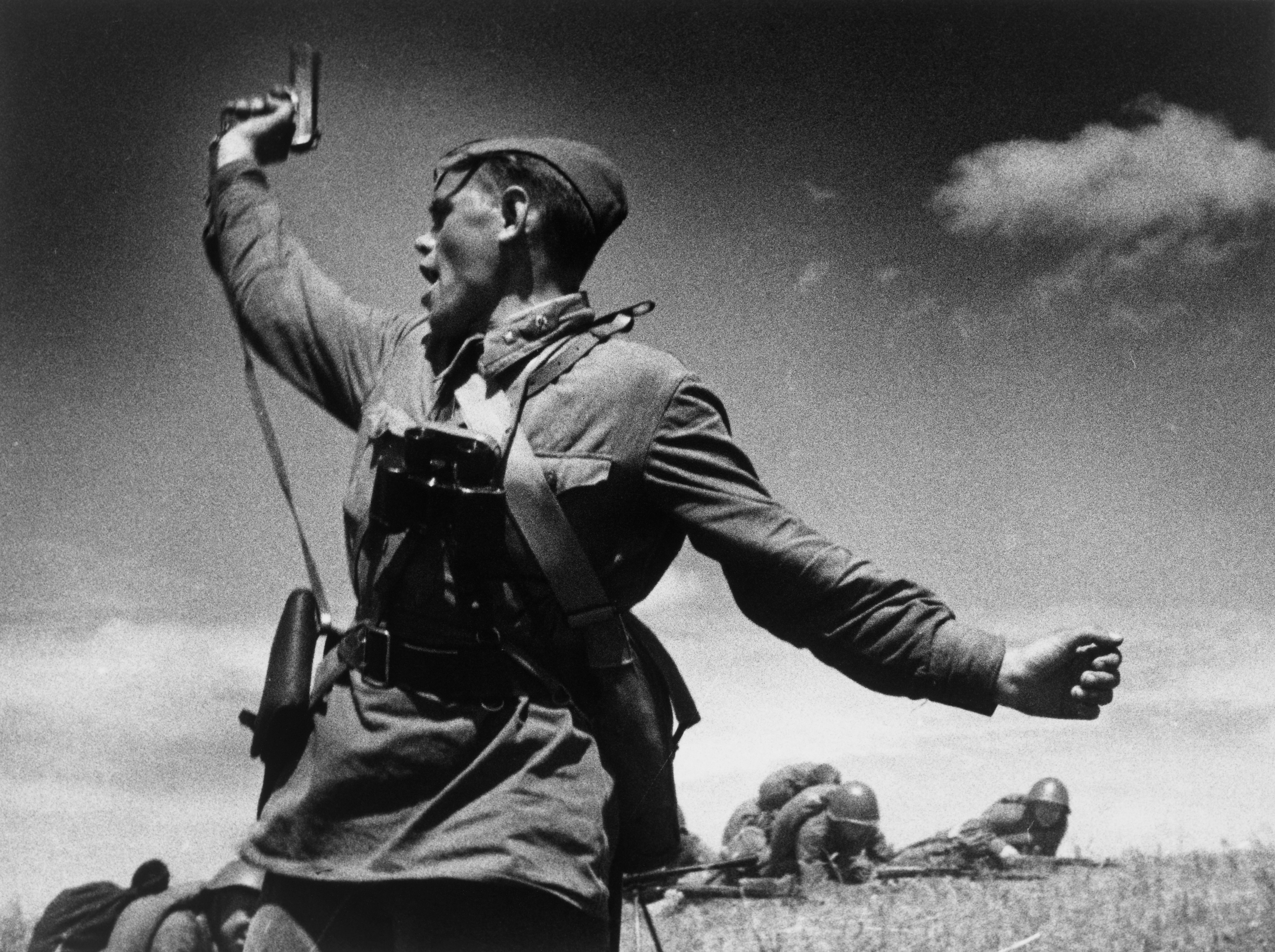
Junior Politruk Aleksey Yeryomenko of the division's 220th Rifle Regiment rallies troops minutes before his death in an assault during operations on the Southern Front, 12 July 1942. Max Alpert's photograph became famous as Kombat.

The division was activated 1919 near Petrograd during the Russian Civil War, and fought on the western front of that war and in the Polish-Soviet War. Until 1923 its headquarters was at Minsk. During the 1930s the division was part of the 5th Rifle Corps, stationed in the Belorussian Military District. It was moved north in 1939 and fought in the Winter War, including at the Battle of Kelja, later joining the newly formed 13th Army.

In July 1941, the division was part of the 3rd Rifle Corps of the Transcaucasian Military District. By an order of 23 July 1941, the 3rd Rifle Corps became the 46th Army, as of 1 August 1941, and the 4th Rifle Division thus became part of the 46th Army. In the middle of April 1942 the division under Colonel Ivan Rosly was fighting as part of the 12th Army. In August 1942 it participated in the Battle of the Caucasus. The division was disbanded after heavy combat in November 1942.

=== Second formation ===
It was re-formed 1943 in the Moscow Military District and from April 1943 – May 1944 it was part of the Baltic Front's 11th Army. Later reassigned to 48th Army. By January 1945, now part of the 25th Rifle Corps of the 69th Army, it took part in the fighting for the Puławy bridgehead in Poland; much weakened by the battle, its effective strength was reduced to not more than six battalions. In April 1945, still part of the 69th Army, it took part in the Battle of Berlin.

It disbanded in accordance with Stavka Directive No. 11095 to the Commander of the 1st Belorussian Front "About renaming of the front to the Group of Soviet Occupation Forces in Germany and its composition" dated May 29, 1945. The troops of the division strengthened other group formations.

=== Third formation ===
The division was re-formed again in 1955 from the 179th Rifle Division in the South Ural Military District at Buzuluk but then was reorganised as the 4th Motor Rifle Division on 25 June 1957. The 4th Motor Rifle Division was disbanded in 1959.

== Order of battle 1941–1945 ==
- 39th Rifle Regiment
- 101st Rifle Regiment
- 220th Rifle Regiment
- 40th Artillery Regiment

== Distinctions and divisional decorations ==
- 1923: Received the honorific title "In the name of the German Prolétariat";
- 1945: Name of "Bezhitsa". inscribed on the divisional banner.

== Bibliography ==
- Feskov, V.I.; Golikov, V.I.; Kalashnikov, K.A.; Slugin, S.A. (2013). Вооруженные силы СССР после Второй Мировой войны: от Красной Армии к Советской [The Armed Forces of the USSR after World War II: From the Red Army to the Soviet: Part 1 Land Forces] (in Russian). Tomsk: Scientific and Technical Literature Publishing. ISBN 9785895035306.
- Conner, Albert Z.; Poirier, Robert G. (1985). Red Army Order of Battle in the Great Patriotic War: Including Data from 1919 to the Present. Presidio Press. ISBN 978-0-89141-237-3.
