= Finnish escort Aura II =

Finnish escort vessel

Coordinates: 60°23′N 19°10′E

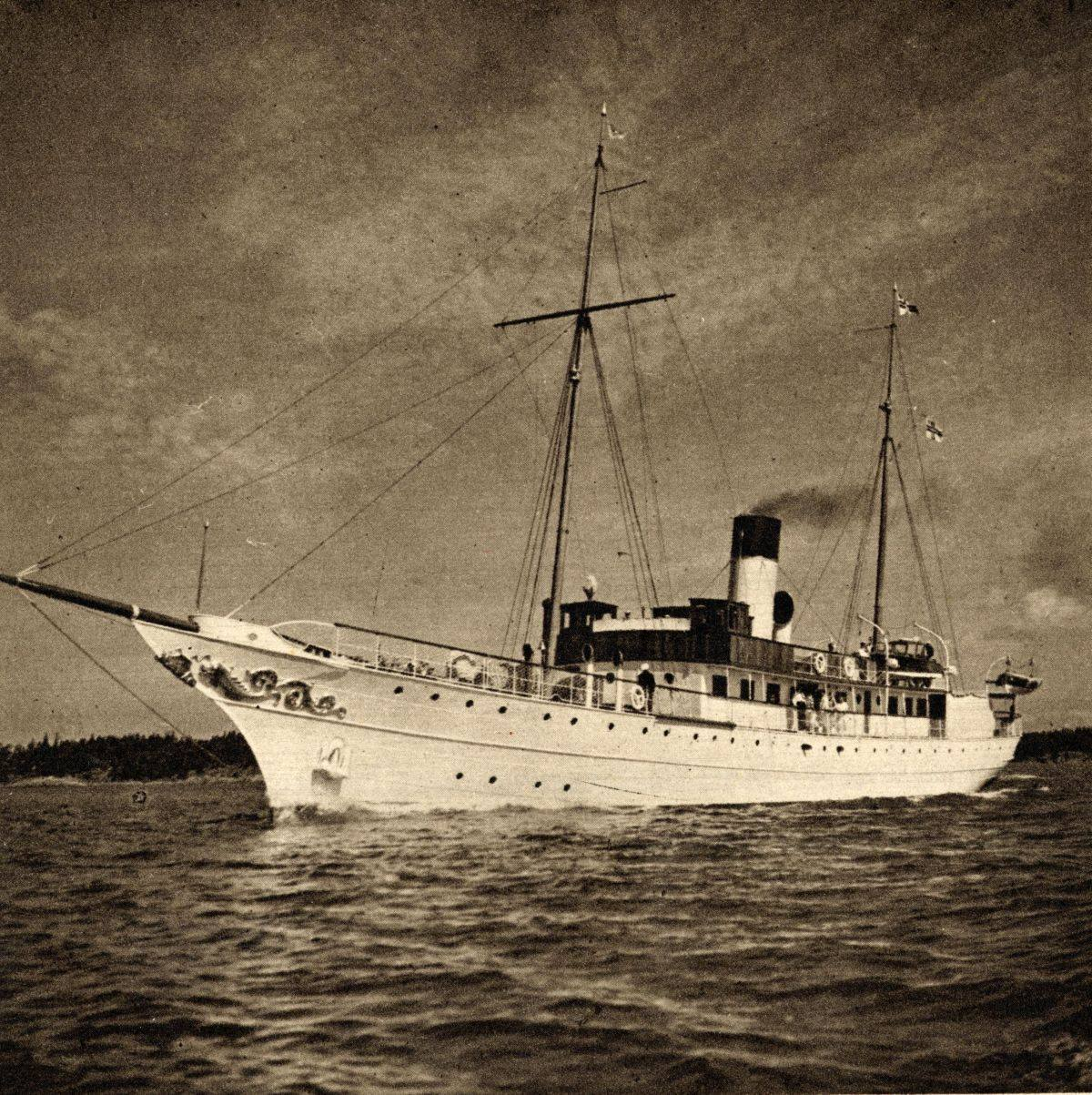

History

Finland
- Name: Aura II
- Builder: Motala Verkstad, Lindholmens Verkstads AB, Gothenburg
- In service: 1884; 1939 (Finnish Navy)
- Fate: Sunk by own depth charge on 13 January 1940

General characteristics
- Displacement: 466 tons
- Length: 51.50 m (169.0 ft)
- Beam: 7.80 m (25.6 ft)
- Draught: 3.20 m (10.5 ft)
- Propulsion: Two twin-cylinder compound steam engines
- Speed: 12
- Complement: 41 officers and men
- Armament: 1 × 75 mm; 1 × 20 mm Madsen; 1 × machine gun; depth charge throwers

The location of the wreck.

Aura II (formerly known as SS Halland, Bore II, SS Seagull and SS Aura) was a Finnish escort vessel, and a former presidential yacht, operated by the Finnish Navy between 1939 and 1940. The ship participated in the Winter War.

The ship was originally constructed as the passenger vessel SS Halland by the Swedish shipyard Lindholmens. She was renamed Bore II during a sejour with another shipping company. She was bought in 1930 by the Finnish businessman Hans von Rettig, who rebuilt the ship into a luxurious yacht, and renamed her SS Seagull. He donated the ship to the Finnish state in 1936, to be used as a presidential yacht. She was then given the name SS Aura. She was taken over by the Finnish Navy when the Winter War erupted in 1939, and since the name Aura already was taken by another vessel, she was given a new name, SS Aura II.

== The last mission ==
On 13 January 1940, Aura II was escorting a convoy across the Sea of Åland. The small convoy consisted of the cargo vessels SS Anneberg, SS Hebe and the passenger vessel SS Bore I. When they passed Märket Island, the escort vessel Tursas noticed torpedo tracks in the water. Soon thereafter a submarine surfaced 300 m on the port side. Tursas sounded the alarm and tried to ram the Soviet submarine. Aura II followed and dropped three depth charges, and soon an oil slick was seen on the water surface. It was the Soviet submarine ShCh-324, which had been trying to sink the largest of the transport vessels Anneberg. However, the torpedo went between Anneberg and Hebe. Seeing the oil slick, Aura II decided to finish off the submarine. Two more depth charges were fired, but a third depth charge exploded in its thrower. The 135 kg trotyl charge completely tearing the wooden ship apart. 26 men died and 15 were saved. The ship's commander, Lieutenant Esra Terä, was mortally wounded, but managed to utter some last words: "Let us sing, boys". The Soviet submarine managed to return to its home base.

The wreck of Aura II is located at the Finnish-Swedish border, north of Märket Island, at 60° 23' N, 19° 10' E.
