= Battle of Kelja =

1939 battle of the Winter War

- Part of Winter War
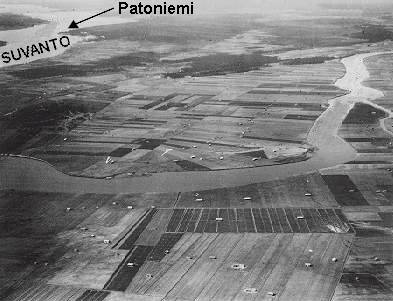
- Aerial photograph of the Koukunniemi cape in the Taipale sector, taken from the south, facing north.
| Date | 25–27 December 1939 |
| Location | Kelja area, eastern Karelian Isthmus, Finland 60°40′29″N 30°14′42″E |
| Result | Finnish victory |

Belligerents
| Finland | Soviet Union |

Strength
| 10th Division | 4th Division |

Casualties and losses
| 141 killed 375 wounded | 2,000 killed |
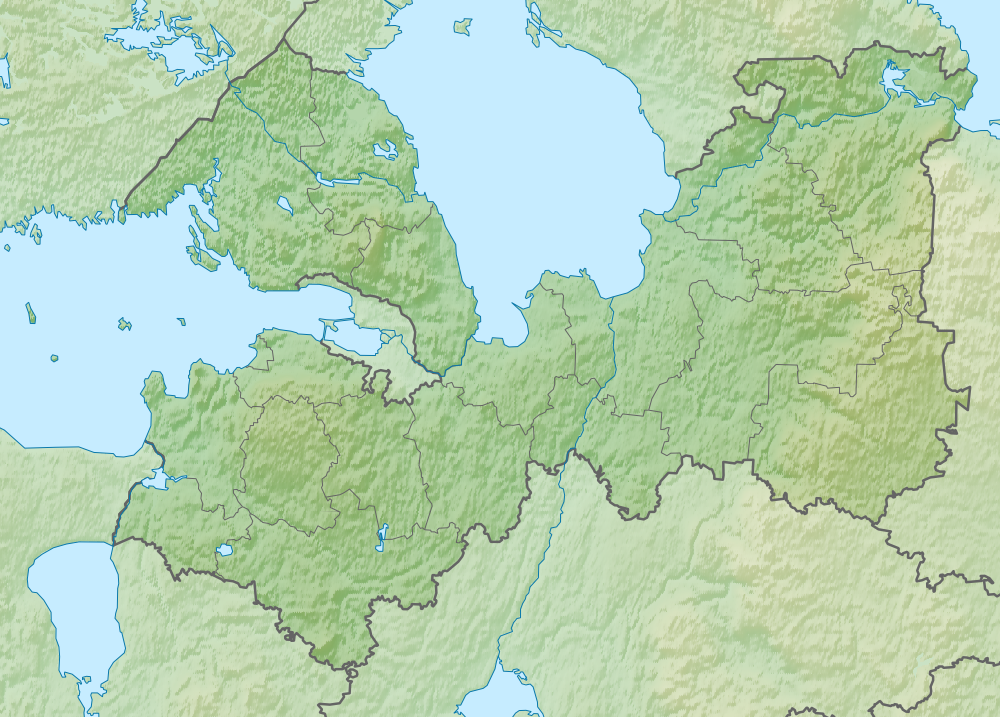
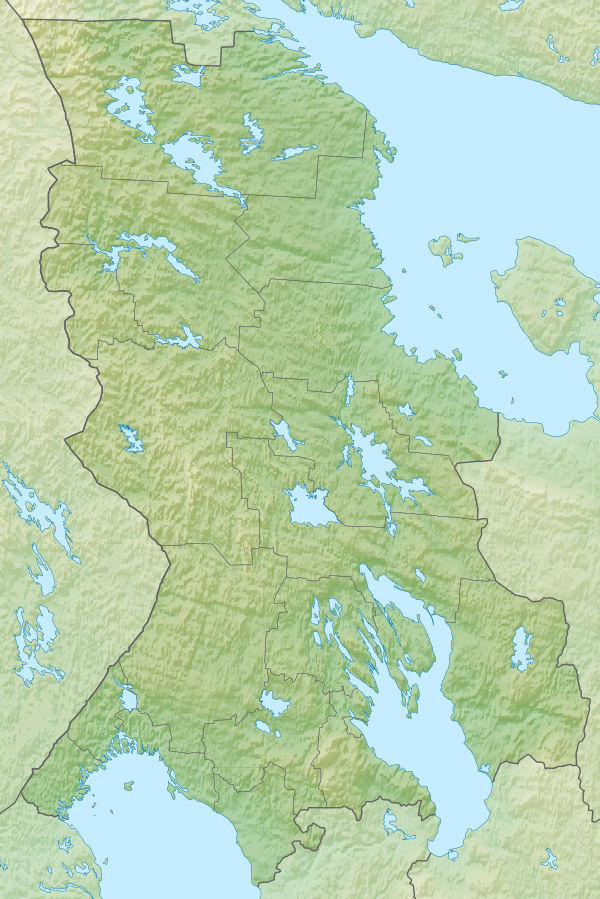
- Location within Leningrad Oblast Battle of Kelja (Finland) Battle of Kelja (Karelia)

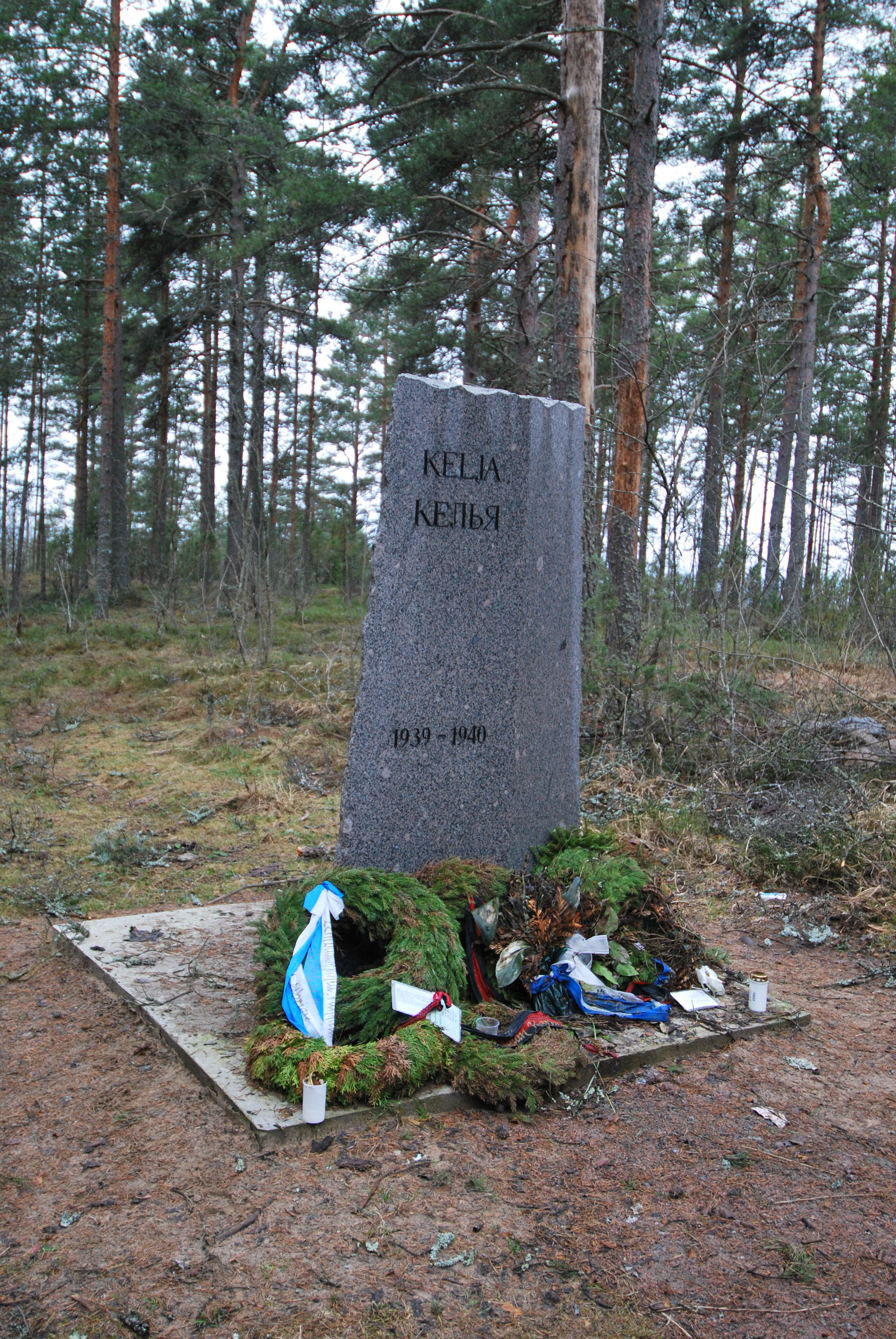
Monument at the place of former Kelja village

The Battle of Kelja, fought from December 25 to December 27, 1939 in and around the village of Kelja (now Portovoe, Priozersky District, Leningrad Oblast, Russia), was a part of the Winter War between Finland and the Soviet Union.

== Prelude ==
In the weeks before the Soviet attack, the whole Taipale sector had been under heavy shelling and daily infantry attacks. These attacks were all repulsed, mainly by Finnish artillery. The infantry attacks had reached their climax on December 17, and abruptly ceased the next day. However, the shelling increased in intensity, and lasted throughout the invasion. In the final days before the main attack, Finnish reconnaissance planes reported the arrival of the Soviet 4th Rifle Division, and ground patrols reported unusually high amounts of Soviet soldiers in the area.

== Battle ==
=== December 25 ===
The attack began early in the morning, with Soviet soldiers crossing the iced-over Lake Suvanto under the cover of darkness. With the help of dense snowfall, the attack achieved nearly total surprise. The Soviets unleashed a massive artillery barrage on Patoniemi Fort, away from the main attack at Kelja. When the first Soviet soldiers reached the beachhead, artillery finally opened up on rear Finnish positions. This caused confusion as to the size of the attack, including the company defending the beachhead reporting the attack as “nothing unusual”.

Eventually, three beachheads were established at Patoniemi, Volossula, and Kelja. Finnish artillery was able to repel the second and third waves of reinforcements, however a battalion had already landed at each of the three beachheads.

At the Patoniemi sector, the Soviets had deployed their heavy machine guns on the flanks of the Finns before they realised what was happening. The defenders were able to stall the attack long enough to alert their battalion headquarters. Finnish command reacted swiftly, committing a reserve battalion to the defence, and within a few hours the majority of the attackers had been pushed back across the ice or destroyed. However, sporadic resistance lasted until evening, when the area was finally cleared.

The Volossula sector was put on alert after the regimental headquarters was informed of the Patoniemi landings. After reporting that there were no Soviet forces in sight, they were ordered to advance towards Patoniemi. However, the Soviet troops began landing on the shores and they were forced to deal with them before advancing. The Finnish battalion sent to reinforce the company defending the beach was hit by an artillery barrage, but nevertheless reached the objective within an hour. When they got there, the Soviets were already starting to dig in. Intense fighting ensued, and the Soviets were pushed back across the ice with heavy casualties.

At the Kelja sector, the battalion commander received reports of Soviet forces crossing the ice. Finnish artillery opened up immediately and prevented the left wing of the attack from reaching the shores. By the time the battalion reserves could be mobilised, the rest of the attacking forces were already at the edge of the field near Kelja. A Finnish counter-attack managed to push them back to the edge of the forest with the help of an artillery barrage. The Soviet troops dug in and managed to repel another counter-attack, with fighting lasting throughout the day.

=== December 26 ===
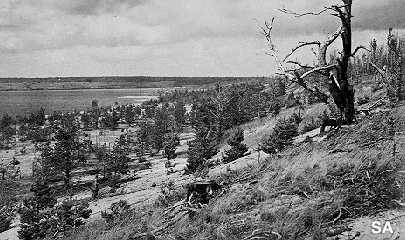
Patoniemi cape from the Southeast

Throughout the day, the Soviets tried to send reinforcements across the ice, most of which were repulsed by Finnish artillery. Two more counter-attacks against the dug-in Soviet positions failed, as the situation became more serious. The Finnish command decided an immediate and decisive attack was needed to defuse the situation. Early in the morning on December 26, the attack began as a company of Finns advanced towards the Soviets. Without artillery, the mortars they were promised and under heavy fire, they were forced to retreat.

Another attack, this time with two companies, began later that day. The attack made some gains early on, but after using most of their ammunition and coming under a heavy artillery bombardment, they were forced to withdraw. The rest of the battalion was ordered to hold their positions and stop reinforcements from crossing the ice.

According to Chew, "For three days, these costly advances across the half-mile stretch of ice continued. Elements up to company size temporarily gained the northern shore - one unit even reached the Finnish artillery positions near Kelja - but the main attacking forces were stopped or destroyed on the Lake, which was littered with hundreds of bodies."

=== December 27 ===
The Finns launched yet another counter-attack after the Soviets were bombarded by artillery. This attack failed due to heavy machine gun fire, and they were forced to withdraw again.

Then, later that day, another counter-attack with more artillery support was launched. This was a success, as the battered Finnish company managed to infiltrate Soviet positions. After over seven hours of continuous fighting, the majority of Soviet resistance collapsed, though with a high cost. By the morning of December 28, the area was entirely cleared, and the Battle of Kelja was over.

== Conclusion ==
Although the attack eventually failed, it did succeed in draining the Taipale sector of its reserves. The Finns were so short on manpower that reserves from the Western Isthmus had to be relocated to Taipale, further weakening the area. However, they did capture much desperately needed equipment from the Soviets, including 12 anti-tank guns, 140 machine guns, 200 light machine guns and 1500 rifles.

== See also ==
- List of Finnish military equipment of World War II
- List of Soviet Union military equipment of World War II
