= Dziekanka =

District of the city of Gniezno, Poland

- District of Gniezno
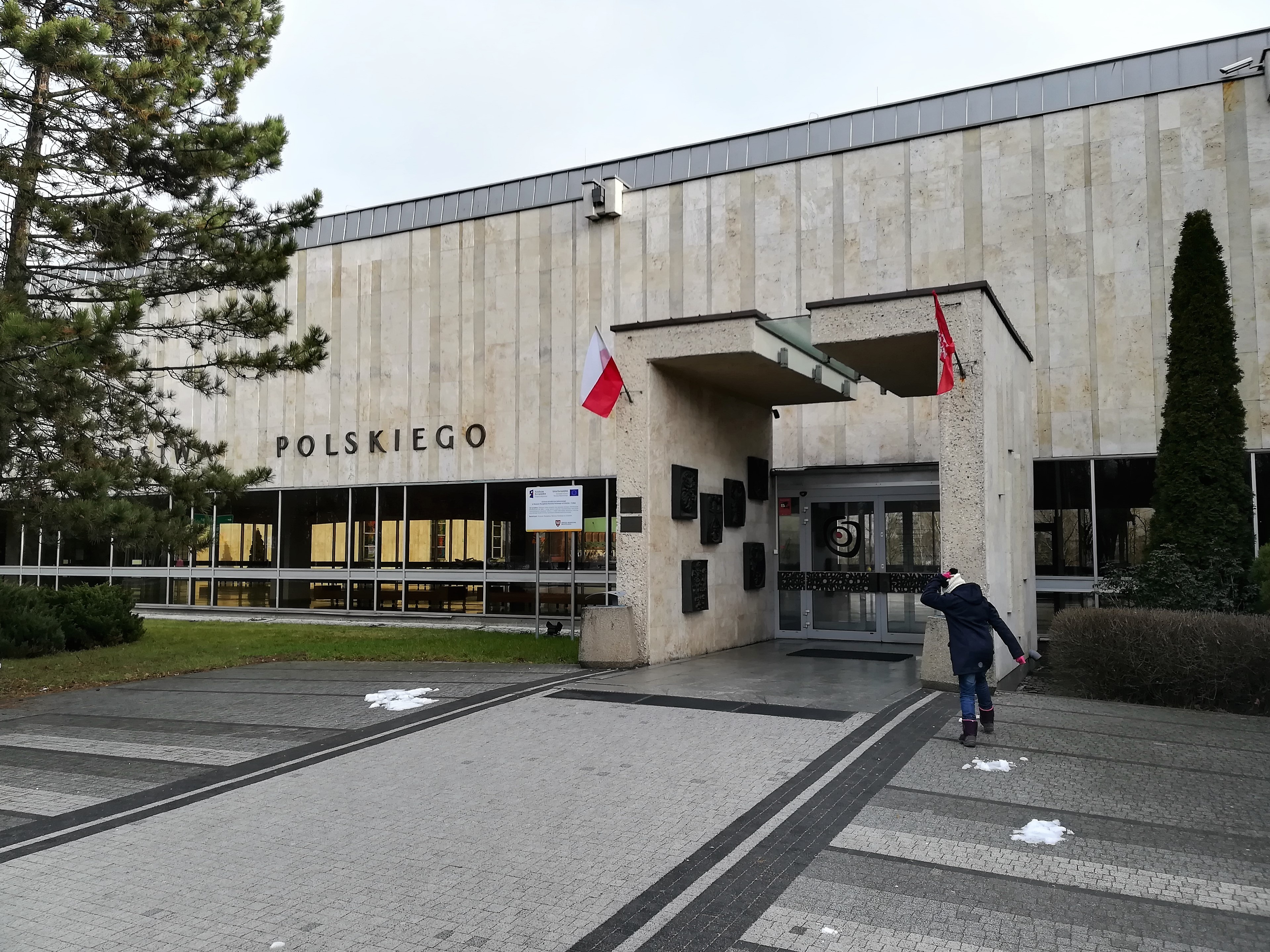
- Museum of the Polish State Origins in Dziekanka

- Location within Poland
- Coordinates: 52°31′47″N 17°34′42″E
- Country: Poland
- Voivodeship: Greater Poland
- County/City: Gniezno
- Time zone: UTC+1 (CET)
  - Summer (DST): UTC+2 (CEST)
- Vehicle registration: PGN

Dziekanka is a district of Gniezno, Poland, located in the western part of the city.

The Museum of the Polish State Origins and the Dziekanka Regional Psychiatric Hospital are located in Dziekanka.

== History ==
In 1894, a psychiatric hospital was established in Dziekanka.

During the German occupation of Poland (World War II), between 7 December 1939 and 12 January 1940, the SS-Sonderkommandos gassed some 1,200 patients of the local psychiatric hospital (see Aktion T4).
