= Battle of Summa =

Battle in the Winter War

- Part of the Winter War
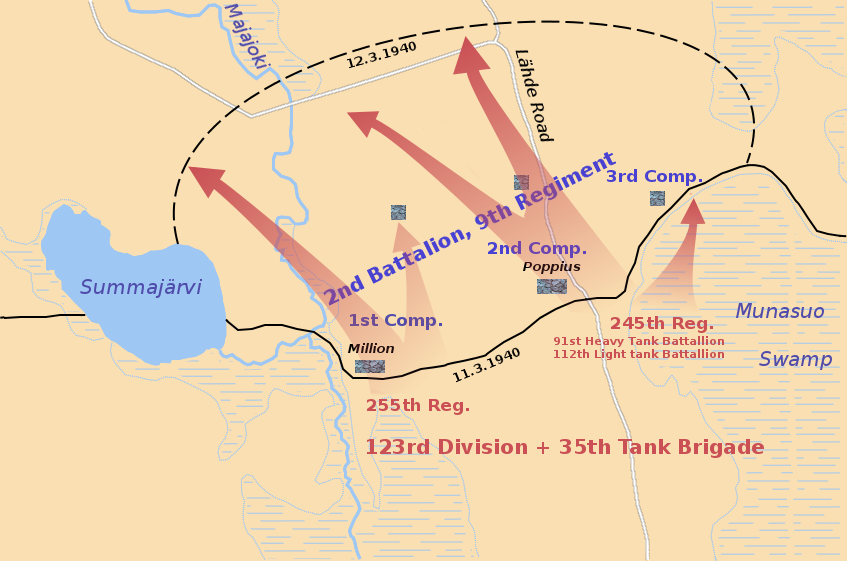
- The Soviet advance during the second phase of the battle.
Date	16–22 December 1939 (First); 1–15 February 1940 (Second)
Location	Summa Lahde Sector 60°30′26″N 29°00′45″E
Result	First battle: Finnish victory Second battle: Soviet victory: Soviets overrun the Mannerheim Line.

Belligerents
Finland	Soviet Union

Commanders and leaders
(Finland) Gustaf Mannerheim (Finland) Harald Öhquist	(Soviet Union) Semyon Timoshenko

Strength
Third Division	7th Army; 13th Army

Casualties and losses
3,000	5,000 – 7,000
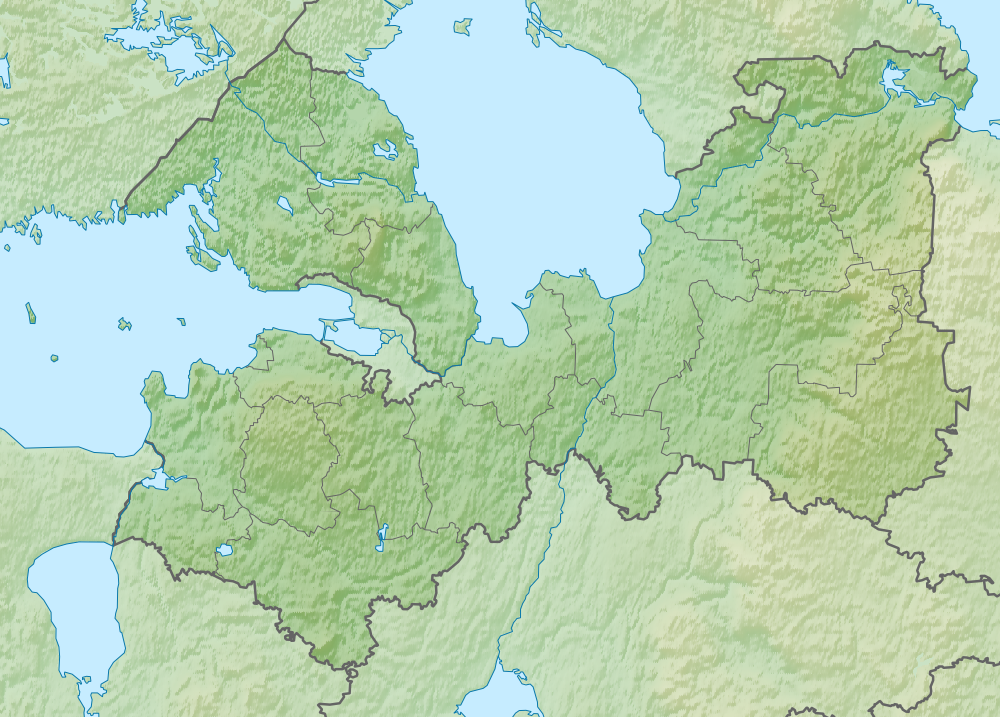
- Location within Leningrad Oblast Battle of Summa (Finland)

The Battle of Summa was fought between the Soviet Union and Finland, in two phases, first in December 1939 and then in February 1940. It was part of the Winter War and was fought near the village of Summa (now Sokolinskoe) along the main road leading from Leningrad to Viipuri.

== Background ==
The village of Summa was a gateway to the city of Viipuri. The Finns had built 41 reinforced concrete bunkers in the Summa area, and the defence line was stronger than elsewhere in the Karelian Isthmus. However, the Finns had made mistakes in planning and nearby Munasuo swamp, east of Summa, had a kilometer wide gap in the line. Furthermore, the Mannerheim Line at Summa bent inward, potentially exposing the rear of rest of the line once penetrated. This bend in the line was done over the objections of General Harald Öhquist.

Finnish planners expected Summa to be hit early on in the war and a false alarm on the first day of fighting reported a Soviet armor breakthrough at Summa. Early on, Soviet general Meretskov attempted draw Finnish forces away from Summa with a feint attack on Taipale sector. However, General Gustaf Mannerheim and the Finns did not take the bait, keeping the Summa area heavily defended.

== First battle in December ==
By December 1939, the Summa sector was defended by the untested Finnish 5h Division. The Soviets began their push on Summa on 17 December, utilizing 200 strike aircraft and a five-hour artillery barrage. They concentrated their efforts on two key areas, Summa itself, and Lähde, a critical road junction. Near Lähde, Soviet armor was preceded by sappers who blew holes in the Finnish lines. Finnish defenses, which included wire and anti-tank rocks, remained relatively intact around Summa.

At least 20 tanks drove through the line on the first day of battle, but the Soviets did not have proper co-operation between branches of service; tanks, artillery and troops fought their own battles. The Finns stood still in trenches and allowed the Soviet tanks to move behind the defence line on 19 December, as they did not have proper anti-tank weapons. After that the Finns repelled the Soviet main troops. Soviet tanks cut-off behind the line aimlessly attacked Finnish strongpoints, but once these were eliminated the threat was over. The Finns won the battle on 22 December.

== Second battle in February ==
According to Chew, "Commander Timoshenko had ordered Meretskov and Grendal' to conduct frequent attacks during the first ten days of February to mislead the enemy about the direction of the main blow, improve the Russian positions, probe the Finnish defenses even more thoroughly, and wear out the troops in the Mannerheim Line. Following the heaviest artillery preparation to date, the Russians launched an offensive along the whole front of the Finnish Second Corps on 1 February." Attacks were strongest in the Summa and Taipale sectors. On 6 February, the Finnish Third Division along the Suokanta-Summa-Lähde-Merkki front, was attacked four times by three divisions and a tank brigade. The Finnish Regiment JR 7 defended Summa village and the direct road to Viipuri so successfully, that the Soviets moved their attack further east to Lähde. The Soviets could afford high casualties during these assaults, losing up to 500 men in a day, so that after ten days their losses amounted to 86 tanks and thousands of men. On 11 February, the main Soviet assault was directed towards Viipuri, with associated drives toward Antrea and Käkisalmi. While 18 other divisions and 5 tank brigades attacked along the Isthmus, Alyabushev's 123rd Rifle Division attacked the "Million" and "Poppius" concrete bunkers.

At 12:28, the Soviets captured the "Poppius" bunker, which according to Chew, was "the key to this sector and - as events developed - to the entire Line west of Lake Muolaanjärvi." The greatest Soviet successes were at Lähde, despite Mannerheim releasing the Fifth Division to help Second Corps in an attempt to counterattack. On 12 February, the "Million" bunker was eliminated in the early morning. Yet the Soviets did not penetrate further, content to consolidate their gains. As Chew states, "Although the Isthmus Army held its front positions tenaciously, its own casualties on that day reached an alarming total of some 1,200 men." On 13 February, a Finnish counterattack by the JR 14 and JR 13 were halted by Soviet artillery, tanks and continued Soviet attacks. Yet the Soviets stopped a mile short of Lähde, fearing additional Finnish counterattacks, and their breakthrough was not exploited.

On 14 February, the Soviet Seventh Army widened its breakthru base at Lähde, while Harald Öhquist conferred with Mannerheim, Aksel Airo, Österman, and Tapola, formulating plans for an orderly Finnish withdrawal to the intermediate "V-Line". On 15 February, the Soviets captured Summa after the Finnish withdrawal. Yet the Soviets stopped once again, a mile north of Lähde, allowing an orderly Finnish retreat on 16 February.

== See also ==
- List of Finnish military equipment of World War II
- List of Soviet Union military equipment of World War II
