= VII Corps (Finland) =

Finnish military unit (1941–1943)

- VII Armeijakunta
- Active: 1941–1943
- Country: Finland
- Branch: Army
- Type: Corps
- Engagements: Finnish invasion of Ladoga Karelia; Finnish invasion of East Karelia (1941)

Commanders
- Notable commanders: Woldemar Hägglund

The VII Corps (Finnish: VII Armeijakunta) was a corps of the Finnish Army during the Continuation War of 1941 to 1944, where the Finnish Army fought alongside Germans against the Soviet Union. Under command of Major General Woldemar Hägglund, it took part in the Finnish invasions of Ladoga Karelia and East Karelia, including the capture of Petrozavodsk. During its existence, its composition varied significantly. It was disbanded in May 1943.

== Mobilization and initial plans ==
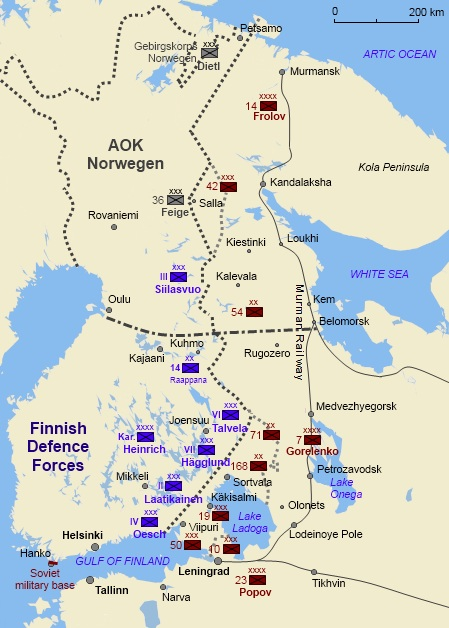
Deployment of forces on the Finno-Soviet border at the beginning of the Continuation War in early July 1941.

The Finnish Army mobilized on 10 June 1941 in preparation for the Continuation War, the Finnish component of the German invasion of the Soviet Union. This followed Finno-German negotiation that had been ongoing from at least May 1941. The VII Corps was formed around the headquarters of the peacetime IV Corps and consisted of the 11th, 7th and 14th divisions.

Commanded by Major General Woldemar Hägglund, the corps initially took defensive positions in the area between Ilomantsi and Pyhäjärvi as the second northernmost Finnish corps. To its north was the III Corps, which was subordinated to the German Army High Command Norway. The VII Corps sector was soon shortened by subordinating the northernmost division of the corps, the 14th, directly to the Finnish General Headquarters. In return, the corps was reinforced with a formation called Group O (Finnish: Ryhmä O) which consisted of three brigades. To its south was the II Corps.

As the Finnish preparations continued in the days following the start of the German invasion on 22 June, the Finnish commander-in-chief Marshal Carl Gustav Emil Mannerheim had concerns regarding the situation of the Finnish forces preparing to attack into Ladoga Karelia. With multiple corps planned to attack in three different directions, the operation was too complicated to be left uncoordinated by a higher echelon. At the same time, any attempt by the Finnish General Headquarters to directly coordinate the actions in the region would have disturbed its ability to properly supervise actions on other fronts. As such, on 29 June Mannerheim ordered the creation of the Army of Karelia to coordinate the actions in the region. The creation of the new army headquarters resulted in a significant reordering of the corps in the region.

During this reorganization, VII Corps was moved to the southern flank of the Army of Karelia into a region spanning from the line Onkamo-Vyartsilya in the north to Pyhäjärvi in the south. Following the reorganization, the corps consisted of the 19th and 7th Divisions. Of these, the 7th was on the north-eastern (left) flank while the 19th was on the south-western (right) flank. The initial plan was for both divisions to strike southeast, with the 7th Division taking Matkaselkä and the 19th Division taking Kaalamo. The corps was ordered to push the Soviet forces in its sector toward either Lake Ladoga or Jänisjoki. Concurrently, other forces of the Army of Karelia would attack to the north of Lake Yanisyarvi before turning south. Together, these two movements would trap Soviet formations on the isthmus between Lake Ladoga and Lake Yanisyarvi. The attack would then continue to the Svir and Lake Onega. However, a lack of artillery, as well as intelligence regarding Soviet preparations in the area, forced the plan to modified. Instead of advancing directly to the Lake Ladoga at Sortavala, VII Corps would advance along the shore of Lake Yanisyarvi.

== Invasion of Ladoga Karelia ==
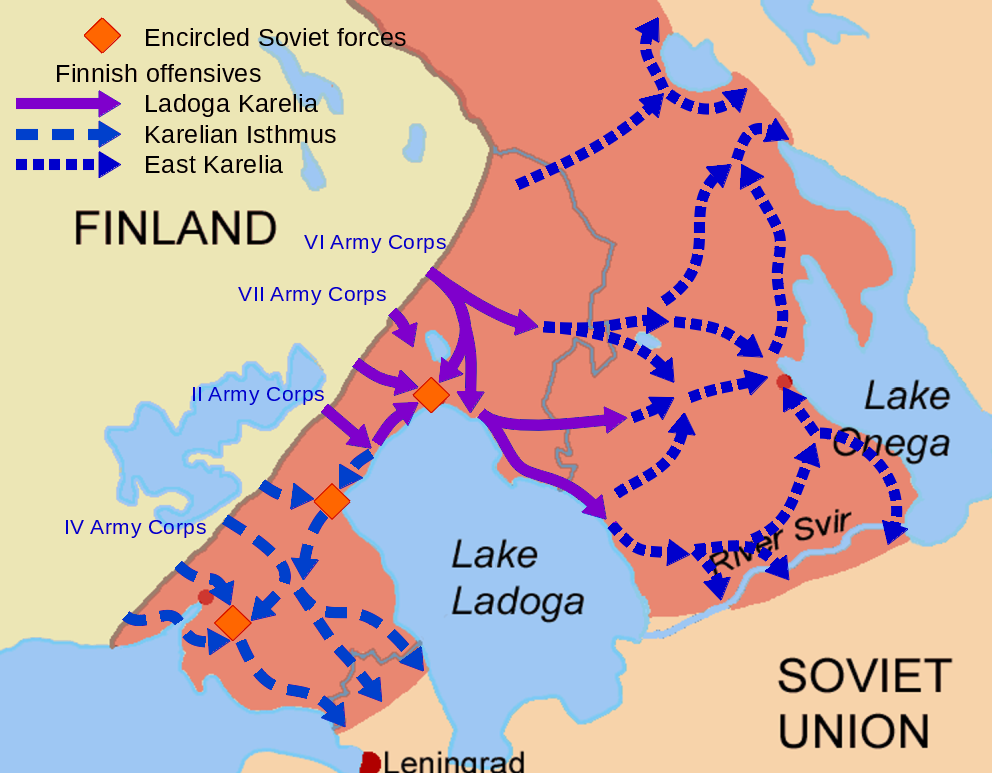
Map depicting the Finnish offensive operations in Karelia carried out in the Summer and Autumn of 1941 during Operation Barbarossa. The furthest advance of Finnish units and borders for both before and after the Winter War are shown.

The Army of Karelia began its offensive operations with an artillery preparation on 9 July at 23:40. The infantry began their attack 28 minutes later. The initial attack of the 7th Division advanced slowly on a narrow front, causing significant Finnish casualties. The division reached the Matkaselkä railway line five days later, on 15 July. The 19th Division's advance was similarly slow, with the division only advancing some 5 kilometres (3 miles) in the first three days before Soviet counterattacks brought the advance to a halt. The VII Corps redirected both the 7th and the 19th Divisions towards Matkaselkä, and by the night of 17 July they had reached the Jänisjoki river, from whence the 7th Division continued towards Lake Ladoga. On 12 July, they began to swing east towards Sortavala. The Soviet forces in the region were cut off when II Corps reached Lahdenpohja to the east on 7 August. VII Corps began to develop this large encirclement by attempting to further encircle Soviet forces in the town of Sortavala.

On 8 August, VII Corps was effectively renamed I Corps, when that formation was reformed under the command of Lieutenant General Einar Mäkinen to clarify the command structure in the area northwest of Lake Ladoga. Consisting of the 7th, 19th and 2nd divisions, I Corps was to destroy the Soviet forces encircled in the area of Sortavala and then organize coastal defenses. The Finns took Sortavala by 15 August, capturing some 540 prisoners of war and trapping the main body of the Soviet 168th Division along the shore of Ladoga between Lahdenpohja and Sortavala. Finnish forces took the area by 20 August, but failed to prevent the 168th Division from escaping in part. In the next days, 7th Division was moved to strategic reserve in the Sortavala region, while the 2nd Division and 19th Divisions were transferred to the Karelian Isthmus. I Corps then moved to the Karelian Isthmus where it took control of the 10th and 15th divisions, previously subordinated to the II Corps.

== Invasion of East Karelia ==
When the divisions previously constituting VII Corps continued their action in the Sortavala region under the newly formed I Corps, the old VII Corps headquarters had transferred to Ladoga Karelia, where it reformed still under the command of Hägglund. Alongside Group O, the Corps continued its attack in the Suoyarvi region. It was soon given orders to capture Petrozavodsk. For this operation, the corps consisted of the 1st and 11th divisions, with the 7th Division in reserve. The Finnish attack took Pryazha on 8 September, reaching Svyatozero on 14 September. There, forces of VII Corps linked up with VI Corps, which had moved around the Soviet forces from the south. The 11th Division reached the northern parts of the city on 1 October, with the 1st Division capturing it later that day.

On 6 November, Finnish forces in the region were ordered to advance north towards the northernmost point of Lake Onega, which would be used to anchor an east-facing defensive line. For this attack, the forces on the northern flank of the Army of Karelia were reorganized as II Corps, which consisted of the 4th and 8th divisions, Group O and Brigade K. Finnish active operations ceased in early December, after the Finnish forces had secured the isthmus between Medvezhyegorsk and Lake Segozero.

During the ensuing trench warfare period, VII Corps remained in Petrozavodsk, where it was responsible for coastal defence. The corps was disbanded in May 1943, with its subordinate Lake Onega Coastal Brigade (Finnish: Äänisjärven Rannikkoprikaati) becoming directly attached to the Onega Group.
