= Hannu Hannuksela =

Finnish general

Esa Hannuksela
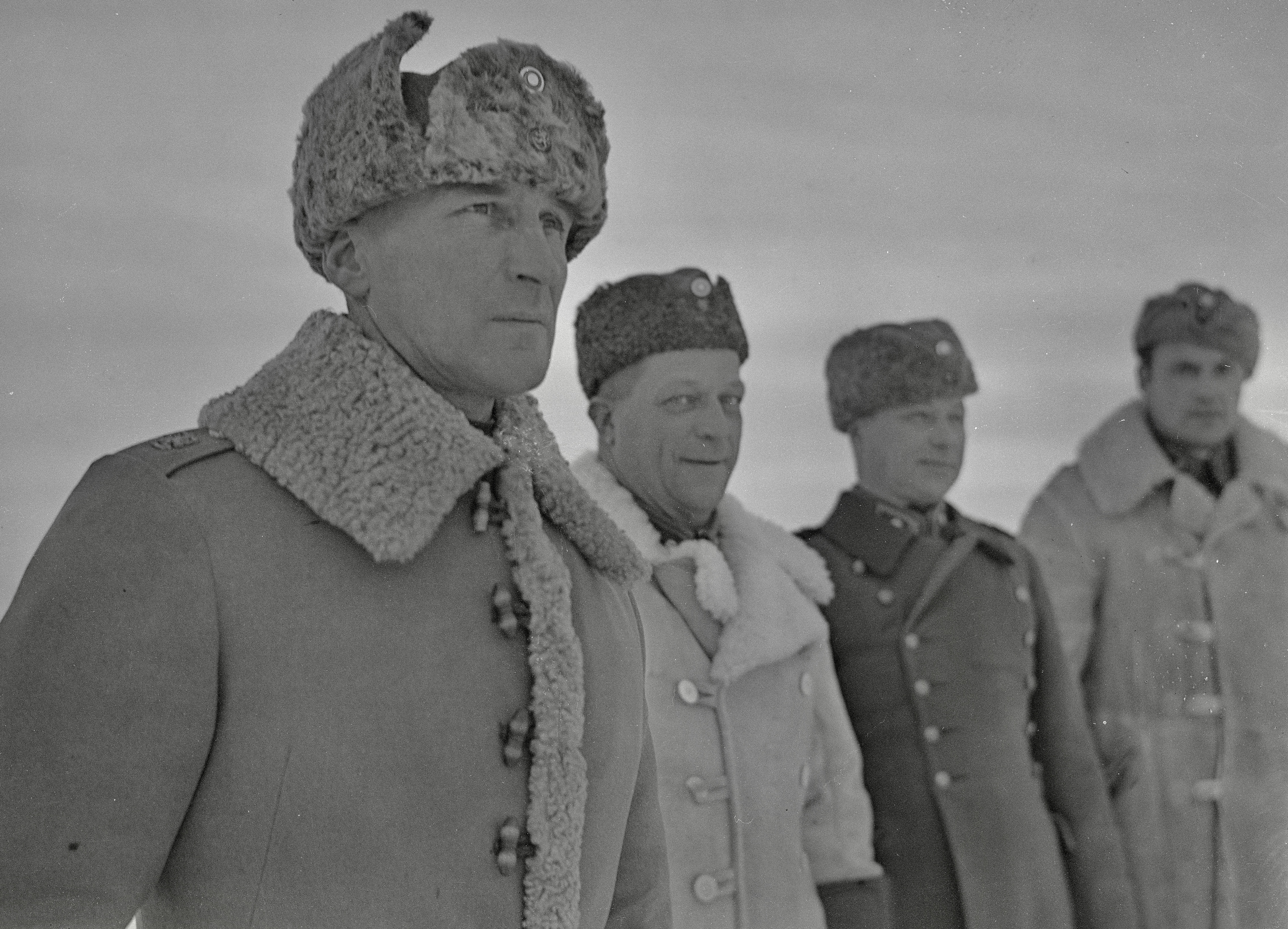
- Hannuksela with his staff on the Karelian Isthmus, January 1942
- Born: Hannu Esa Hannuksela; 12 December 1893; Ilmajoki, Vaasa Province, Grand Duchy of Finland, Russian Empire
- Died: 5 December 1942 (aged 48); Kivennapa, Leningrad Oblast, Russian SFSR, Soviet Union
- Burial place: Hietaniemi Cemetery
- Military career
- Allegiance: German Empire (to 1918); Finland
- Service years: 1916–42
- Rank: Kenraalimajuri
- Commands: Savonia Military Province (September 1934); 13th Division (October 1939); South Ostrobothnia Military Province (February 1941); 19th Division (June 1941); 2nd Division (February 1942)
- Conflicts: See battles: World War I; Eastern Front; Finnish Civil War; Battle of Tampere; Battle of Vyborg; World War II; Winter War; Ladoga Karelia; Continuation War; Reconquest of Ladoga Karelia
- Awards: Cross of Liberty, 1st Class with Oak Leaves; Iron Cross 2nd Class

Hannu Esa Hannuksela (12 December 1893 – 12 May 1942) was a Finnish Major General during World War II.

== Life and career prior to World War II ==
Born to a vicar in Ilmajoki, Vaasa Province, Hannuksela graduated from Kuopion klassilinen lyseo, an upper secondary school, in 1914. He began his military career by entering German service as a volunteer in the Royal Prussian 27th Jäger Battalion in March 1916 at the Lockstedter Lager in Germany, where he specialised as an artilleryman in a light howitzer battery. From spring 1916 to January 1917, Hannuksela fought on the Eastern Front alongside the battalion at numerous battles near Riga, receiving experience in trench warfare, offensive operations and winter combat. His first promotion was to hilfsgruppenführer ("squad leader") in December 1917. In February 1918 he was promoted to fähnrich, returning to Finland with his battalion later that month.

During the Finnish Civil War, Hannuksela served as a section leader and artillery observer in the Jäger artillery brigade, participating in the battles of Tampere and Viipuri. He was promoted to luutnantti in April 1918 and was awarded the Cross of Liberty, 4th Class. After the civil war, Hannuksela received formal artillery education at the Finnish Artillery School from July 1918 to October 1918. After service as a battery commander until April 1919, his career path began to trend upwards. He was appointed as a coastal artillery battalion commander in April 1919, was promoted to kapteeni a month later and completed his artillery education in 1920. In 1923 he fulfilled a field grade officer training course and on Independence Day was promoted to majuri. From 1924-1926 he studied at the Finnish War Academy, with perfect scores in tactics and weapons. Following his education, Hannuksela spent the late 1920s and early 1930s as an artillery regiment commander, with postings in the coastal-, heavy- and field artillery branches and was promoted to everstiluutnantti in 1927 and eversti in 1930.

In 1930 and 1933 Hannuksela was evaluated by his superior, kenraalimajuri Harald Öhquist, as a talented artilleryman and unit commander with room to grow, more suited to frontline leadership tasks than staff work. He was criticised for his lack of firmness. The latter charge would be repeated by kenraalimajuri Karl Lennart Oesch in 1936.

In 1934, he became the commander of the Savonia Military Province. The province had the responsibility of raising the 13th Division, which Hannuksela would command when the Soviet Union started the Winter War by invading Finland in November 1939.

== World War II ==
=== Winter War ===
As commander of the 13th Division, subordinate to IV Corps, Hannuksela had the task of stopping the Soviet 8th Army advance along the coastal road in southern Ladoga Karelia, before it reached the regional capital of Sortavala. On 12 and 17 December, Hannuksela led active counterattacks against the Soviet 168th and 18th Divisions near Ruhtinaanmäki, attempting to wear them down and slow their advance. The attacks, combined with the Finnish victory at the battle of Tolvajärvi in northern Ladoga Karelia, winter weather and supply difficulties, forced the 8th Army to the defensive and markedly improved the Finnish situation, although casualties were high for the 13th Division due to a lack of artillery support and anti-tank weapons.

With the arrival of 45,000 troops and over 100 field artillery pieces as reinforcements in January, IV Corps was divided into battle groups ranging from battalion-sized formations up to the regimental level. A major counteroffensive was planned, aimed at the complete destruction of the opposing Red Army formations by means of a single envelopment. Hannuksela led a six battalion-strong battle group, acting in cooperation with eversti Pietari Autti's battle group. On 10 January, Hannuksela and Autti completed the encirclement of the Soviet 168th Division. After weeks of fighting, IV Corps had encircled two Soviet infantry divisions and a tank brigade in mottis. 13 mottis were created, of which 10 were annihilated. The 168th Division was not completely wiped out as originally planned, but lost two-thirds of its strength.

=== Continuation War ===
==== The re-conquest of Ladoga Karelia ====
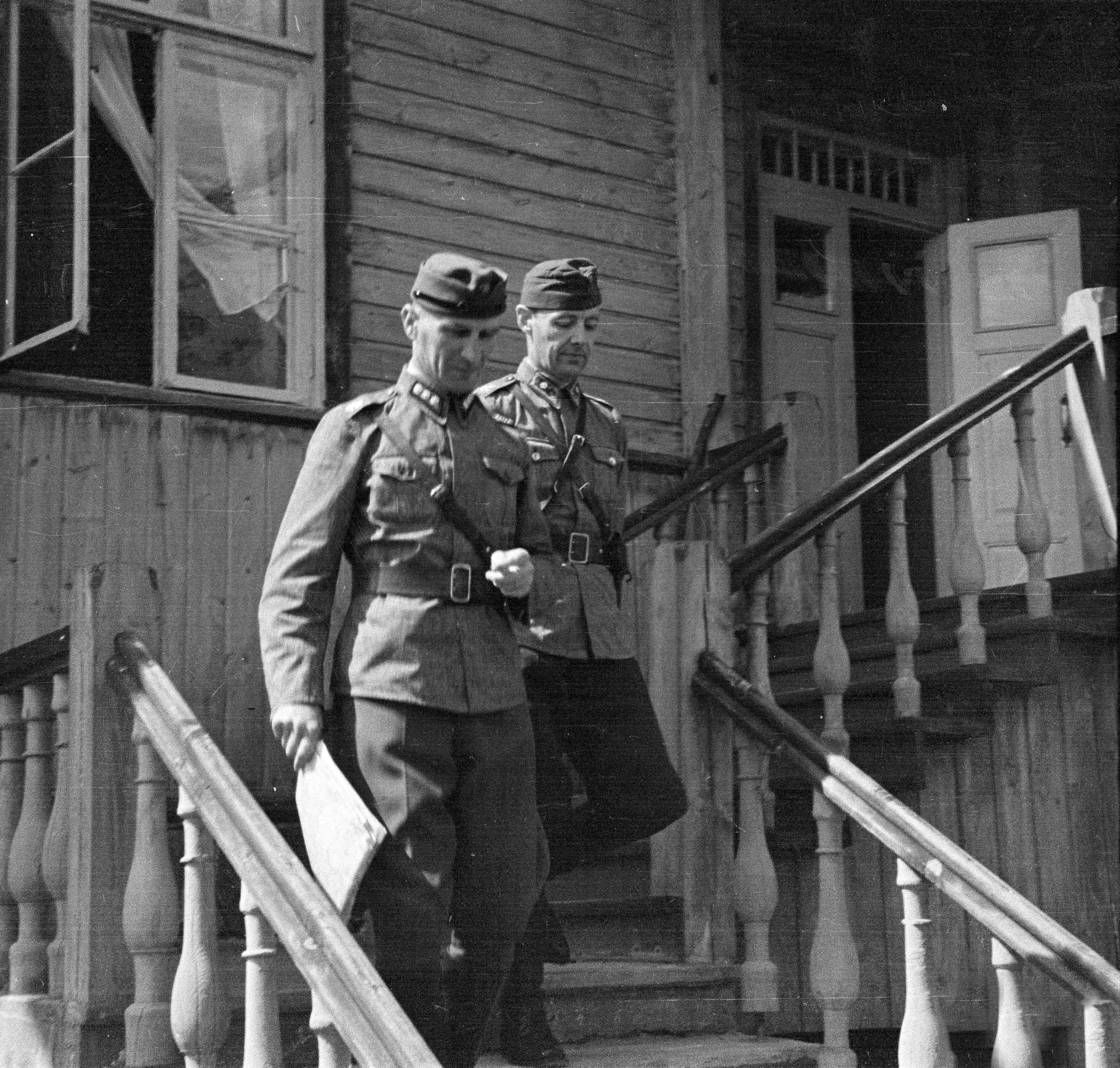
19th Division commander eversti Hannuksela and his chief of staff majuri Lilius about to leave for an inspection visit of the frontline. Kitee, July 1941.

At the beginning of the Continuation War, Hannuksela was the commanding officer of the 19th Division. The division was subordinate to VII Corps, which formed the right flank of the Army of Karelia, commanded by lieutenant general Heinrichs. Heinrichs' mission was to advance to Lake Onega and the Svir River. The task of VII Corps was to capture Sortavala.

As part of the army-level offensive on 10 July Hannuksela's division attacked south near Pyhäjärvi, but was stopped for two days by the Soviet 168th Division that was deployed in prepared positions consisting of concrete bunkers supported by heavy 152mm howitzer battalions and railway artillery. The 19th Division lost 800 men in three days in part due to Hannuksela's decision to deploy two regiments for a narrow breakthrough attempt on the Soviet line, one regiment up front with the second in reserve, rather than advancing on a broader front. Even the battalions of the lead regiment were deployed in depth. On the tactical level this led to traffic congestion and presented easy targets for Soviet artillery.

Under pressure from VII Corps headquarters, Hannuksela responded aggressively to the attack's failure by micromanaging the planned attack routes down to the company level for the next push on 12 July. This was a serious violation of the principles of unit command. Both Hannuksela and VII Corps commander kenraalimajuri Woldemar Hägglund did not question their own planning or leadership capabilities but rather blamed the stalemate on the effective employment of artillery by the Soviets, lack of sufficient artillery support for the 19th Division and the low level of training and defensive mindset of the soldiers themselves, who were largely reservists, rear-echelon troops forced into combat roles or veterans of the Winter War. The greater demands placed on officers and the rank and file by offensive warfare frequently led to confusion. Hannuksela refused to consider that his interventionist command style was contributing to that confusion.

The attack on 12 July broke through the Soviet position by capturing the vital ground near the village of Niinisyrjä. A Soviet counterattack to retake the village from 13–15 July was defeated after which the breakthrough was expanded to the south through follow-up attacks on the 15th with the support of the newly attached Raskas Patteristo 14 (equipped with German 15 cm sFH 18). VII Corps headquarters was irate over the slow pace of the advance. Whereas kenraalimajuri Paavo Talvela's VI Corps had covered an astonishing 100 kilometers with lightning speed in six days to reach the northern shores of Lake Ladoga near Sortavala and cut off Soviet land communications to the east, VII Corps had only achieved a comparatively meager 10 kilometer advance during the same time-span.

In order to support Talvela's advance, Army of Karelia's chief of staff eversti Kustaa Tapola on 16 July ordered eversti Antero Svensson's 7th Division south-east to capture vital road and railway connections. Originally Hannuksela's division was only supposed to tie down the Soviet forces to his south while Svensson's division encircled them. Now Svensson had attack both to the south-east and south simultaneously, the previous encirclement task still being his mission. Hannuksela would destroy the Soviet forces opposing him and advance on Sortavala. One of 19th Division's infantry regiments was attached to 7th Division to support its operations.

Supported by heavy and super-heavy artillery, 19th Division's attack began on 17 July and proceeded smoothly despite fierce Soviet resistance. The Soviet 168th Division burned down villages in the border area to delay the Finns' advance. Outnumbered, the Soviets had to continuously withdraw to shorten their front-line and by 25 July VII Corps had advanced 40 kilometers from the border to the outskirts of Sortavala.

The 19th Division's attack towards Sortavala got underway on 6 August and by 11 August had isolated the city from the south. 7th Division and elements of the 19th began the final assault at noon on 15 August and by 8 p.m. the city had been cleansed, with 500 Soviet troops taken prisoner.

On 31 December 1941 eversti Hannuksela was promoted to kenraalimajuri. On 1 February 1942, he was reassigned as the commander of the 2nd Division. Hannuksela died of a heart attack in his headquarters in May 1942.

== Assessment ==
As a division commander in the Continuation War, Hannuksela acquired a negative reputation as a blind adherent to his superiors' orders. Hannuksela had a strong understanding of Kampfgruppe-style tactics but lacked the strength of will to deviate from the often incoherent orders emanating from corps headquarters. He therefore planned and led operations even when he expected them to fail. When questioned by his subordinates on his decision-making, he saw such feedback as a personal attack, held fast to his thinking and frequently dismissed criticism from them with silence or arrogant responses. Such an inflexible leadership philosophy led to unnecessary losses on the battlefield, which in turn lowered troop morale and caused crises in command that hampered operations.

== Dates of rank ==
Insignia	Rank	Component	Date
	Fähnrich	Imperial German Army	11 February 1918
	Jääkäriluutnantti	Finnish Army	28 April 1918
	Jääkärikapteeni	Finnish Army	16 May 1919
	Jääkärimajuri	Finnish Army	6 December 1923
	Jääkärieverstiluutnantti	Finnish Army	6 December 1927
	Jääkärieversti	Finnish Army	16 May 1930
	Jääkärikenraalimajuri	Finnish Army	31 December 1942
