= II Corps (Finland, Continuation War) =

- II Armeijakunta
- Active: 1941–1944
- Country: Finland
- Branch: Army
- Type: Corps
- Engagements: Continuation War; Finnish invasion of the Karelian Isthmus; Finnish invasion of East Karelia (1941); Battle of Ilomantsi

Commanders
- Notable commanders: Taavetti Laatikainen; Paavo Talvela; Einar Mäkinen

The II Corps (Finnish: II Armeijakunta) was a unit of the Finnish Army during the Continuation War. During the war the corps participated in combat first northwest of Lake Ladoga and on the Karelian Isthmus before moving to the Povenets–Lake Segozero region by late 1941. During the Soviet offensive of 1944, the corps conducted a fighting retreat to the region of Ilomantsi, with parts of its forces participating in the subsequent Battle of Ilomantsi.

== 1941 Finnish invasion of Karelia ==
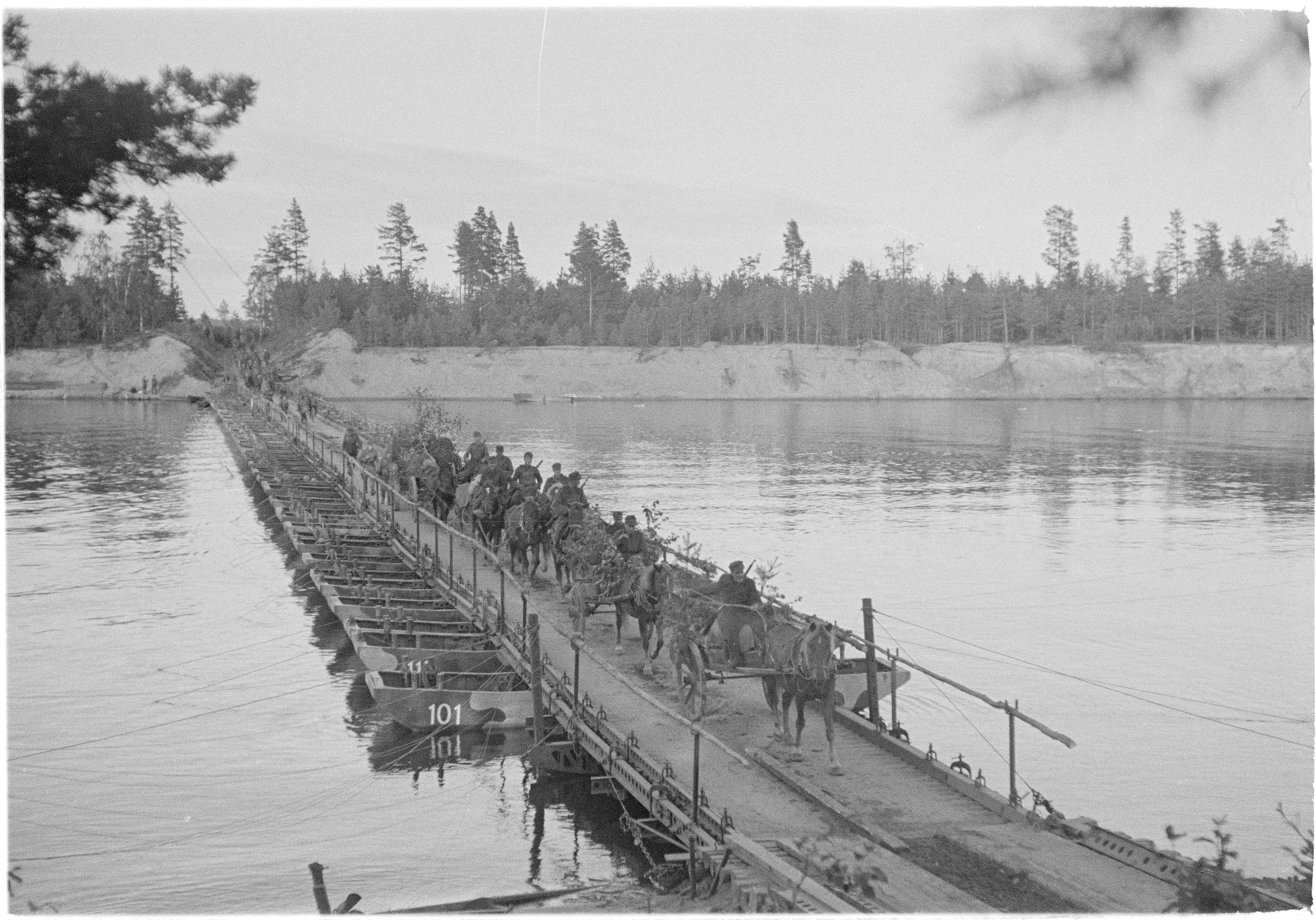
Finnish forces cross Vuoksi river in Äyräpää (Baryshevo) along a pontoon bridge, August 1941.

The corps headquarters was formed from the peace-time III Corps. Consisting of the 2nd, 15th and 18th Divisions, II Corps was part of the Finnish General HQ's reserve during the Finnish invasion of East Karelia of the Continuation War. Before the invasion, II Corps was responsible for the defense of the important industrial area of Upper-Vuoksi, which was deemed vulnerable to a Soviet attack. After the forces of the Army of Karelia had reached Lake Ladoga, the corps joined the invasion with the objective of capturing the Khiytola–Elisenvaara area under the command of Taavetti Laatikainen. By taking control of the region, the corps severed the Soviet land connection north of Lake Ladoga.

Having achieved its initial objectives, the Corps continued in the direction of the eastern Karelian Isthmus. This resulted in several Soviet divisions being cut off along the shore of the lake, which in turn enabled the II Corps to reach the river Vuoksi. By creating a bridgehead over the river in the region of Baryshevo, the Corps put pressure on the Soviet forces engaged in the area of Vyborg.

Following the capture of Petrozavodsk later in 1941, the Corps was reconstituted in that area from forces both already in the region and from those moved from the Karelian Isthmus. Consisting of the 4th, 8th and 14th Divisions, as part of the Army of Karelia, the corps was to advance north from Petrozavodsk towards Kondopoga, and from there towards the isthmus between Medvezhyegorsk and Lake Segozero. The advance halted in Povenets–Lake Segozero region by December 8th, 1941, and the corps would stay in the region until 1944.

== 1942–44 trench warfare phase ==
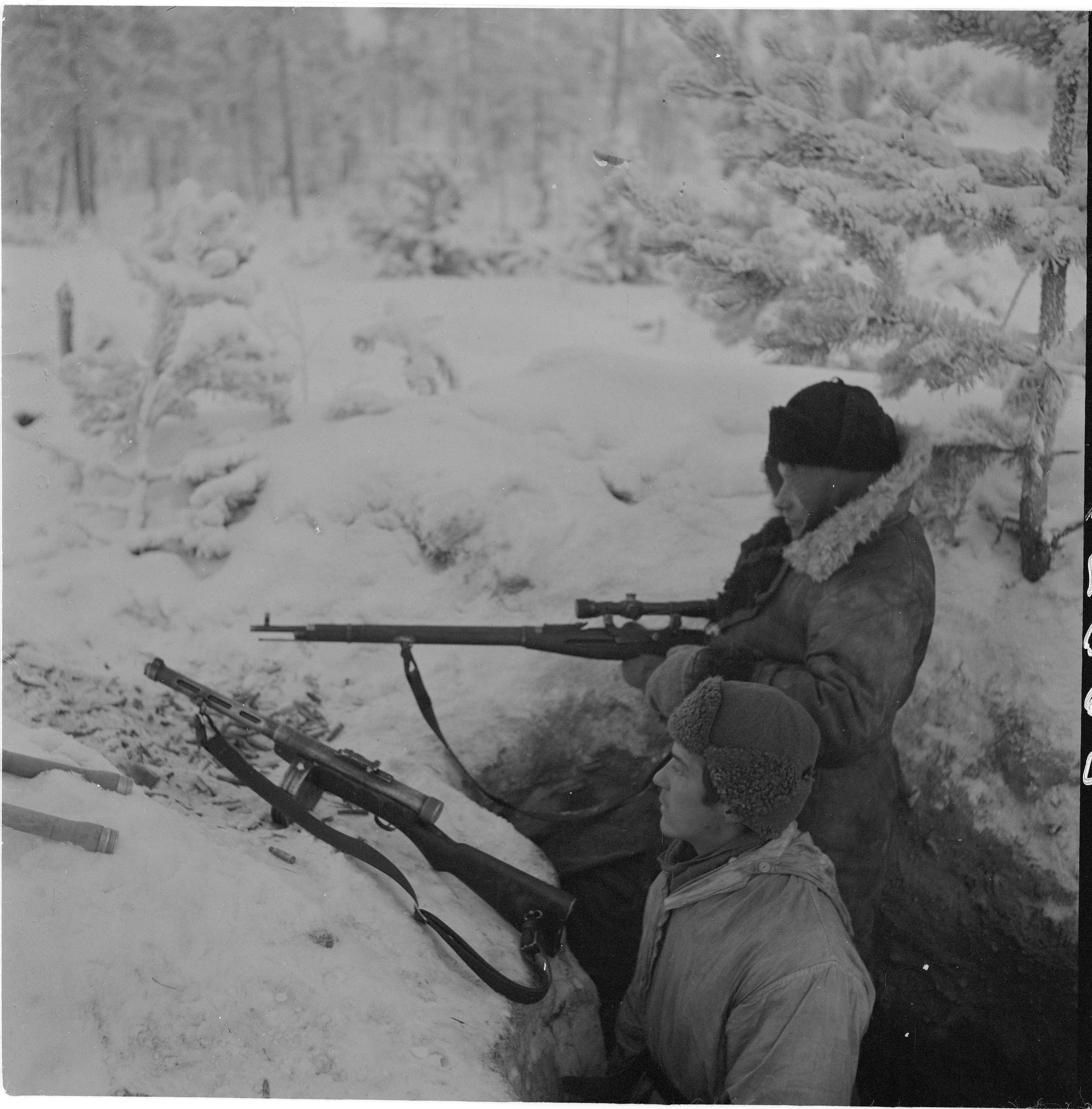
Finnish listening post in the Maaselkä region, December 1941.

From the March 1st 1942 to March 1st 1944, during the trench warfare phase, the corps was renamed as Maaselkä Group (Finnish: Maaselän Ryhmä). At this point, it consisted of the 1st, 4th and 8th Divisions. In early 1942, it repulsed several attacks from the Soviet Karelian Front, after which the sector quieted down except for limited reconnaissance-in-force, long-range reconnaissance and partisan activities. During this time, various units of the Corps also saw several attempted mutinies, after it became increasingly clear that the war would not be as short as had been originally promised by some officers. On 4 March 1944, the corps command was transferred from Laatikainen to Paavo Talvela, who had just returned from Germany.

== 1944 Soviet offensive phase ==
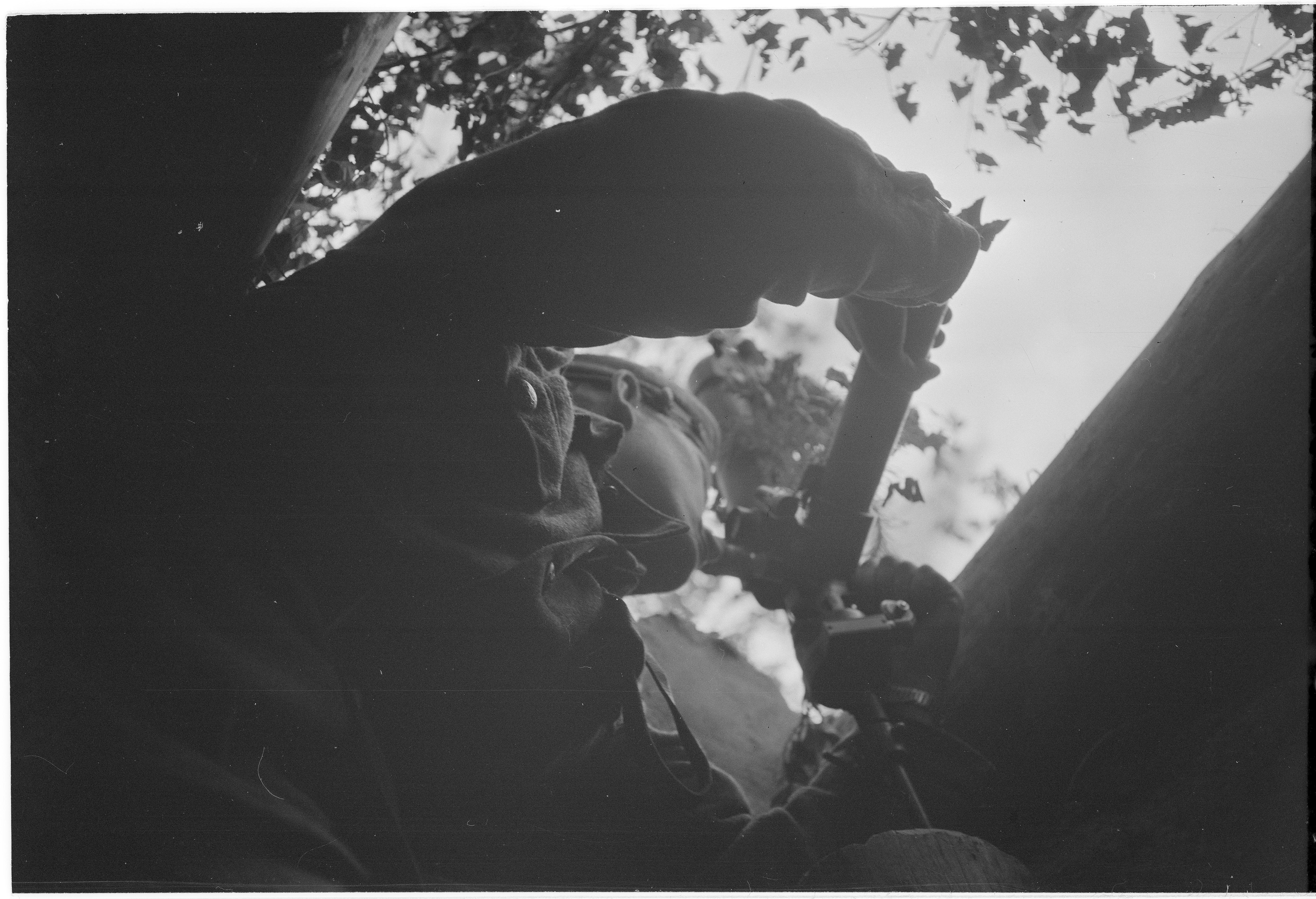
Finnish artillery observer in Porajärvi (Porosozero) in July 1944.

In the summer of 1944, Soviet forces began the Vyborg–Petrozavodsk offensive. This offensive required increasing amounts of forces to be moved from the II Corps to the isthmuses, and by June 1944 II Corps consisted of only the 1st Division and one brigade under the command of Einar Mäkinen. The corps came under attack by four divisions of the Soviet 32nd Army on the night of June 19th–20th 1944, and subsequently conducted a fighting retreat to Suoyarvi–Porosozero area. From there, the corps was pushed further back to the region south of Ilomantsi. There, parts of II Corps were temporarily subordinated to the ad-hoc formation known as Group Raappana, which was tasked with the defence of Ilomantsi. The following Battle of Ilomantsi resulted in the routing and partial destruction of two Soviet divisions through encirclement.

== See also ==
- Finnish II Corps (Winter War)
- List of Finnish corps in the Continuation War
