= V Corps (Finland) =

- V Armeijakunta
- Active: 1941; 1942–1944
- Country: Finland
- Branch: Army
- Type: Corps
- Engagements: Continuation War; Vyborg–Petrozavodsk offensive; Battle of Vyborg Bay (1944)

Commanders
- Notable commanders: Taavetti Laatikainen (1941); Einar Mäkinen (1942–43); Antero Svensson (1943–44)

The V Corps (Finnish: V Armeijakunta) was a unit of the Finnish Army during the Continuation War of 1941–1944. It was first active for a brief time in 1941, and was reactivated in 1942 in the Svir sector during the trench warfare phase of the war. Following the Soviet Vyborg–Petrozavodsk offensive, the corps was moved to the Karelian Isthmus, where it fought in the Battle of Vyborg Bay, stopping a Soviet amphibious operation to cross the Vyborg Bay.

== Lead-up to the Continuation War ==
The V Corps was formed in 1941 around the headquarters of the peacetime I corps. Commanded by Major General Taavetti Laatikainen, it consisted of the 5th and 10th divisions during the initial mobilization. While most of the Finnish army moved to the border in the lead-up to the war, the 5th Division was first held further back from the border, and later transferred to the Finnish General HQ. The corps was position near the Karelian Isthmus, between the IV Corps and the II Corps.

On 29 June 1941, the General HQ ordered the creation of the Army of Karelia. As part of this reorganization, the V Corps was disbanded by transferring its only division, the 10th, to the IV Corps and transferring the headquarters personnel to other formations.

== In East Karelia 1942–1944 ==
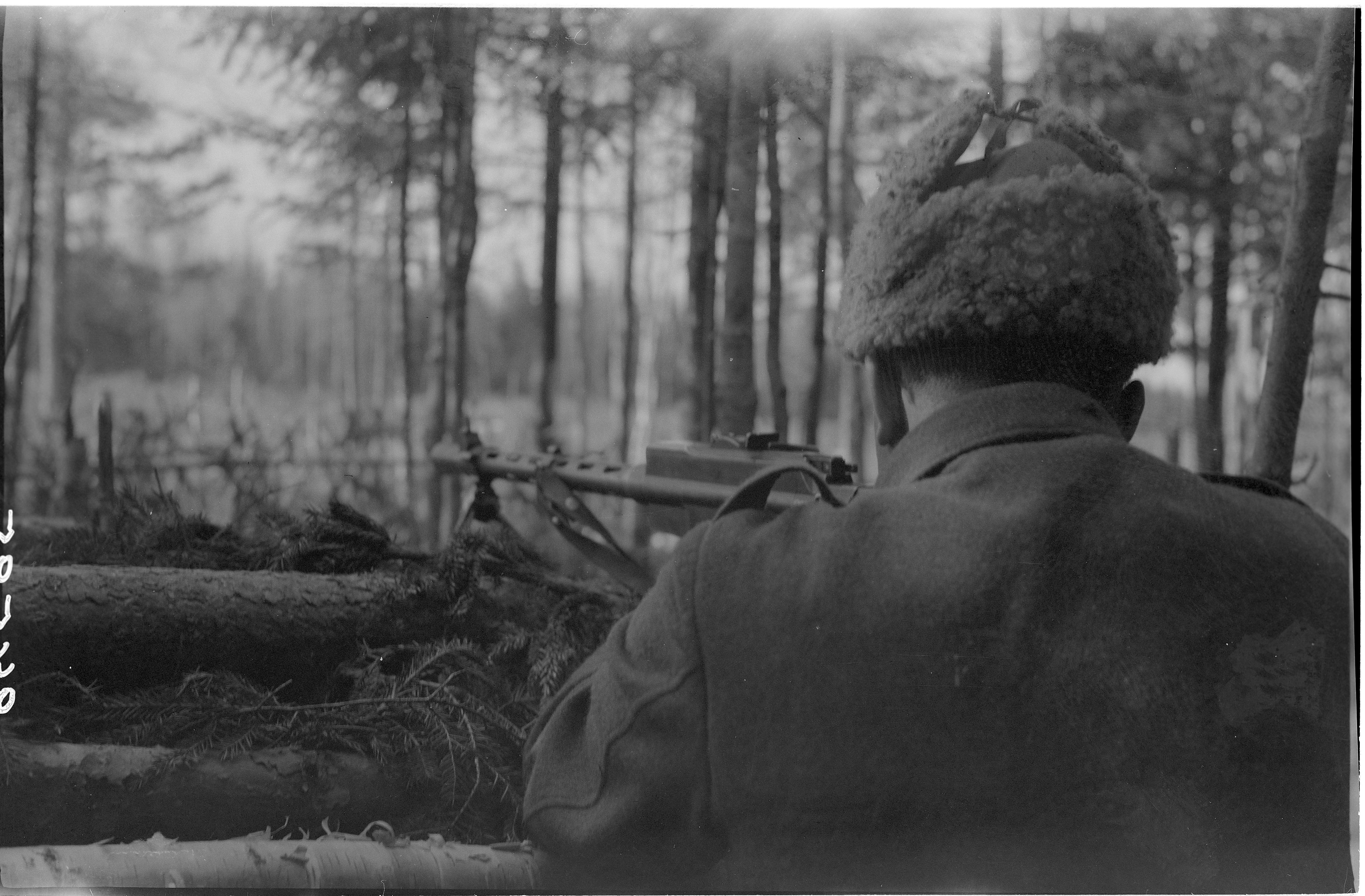
A Finnish machine-gun position in Voznesenje, on the Svir front, 1942

Towards the end of 1941, the initial Finnish offensive was slowing down on two of the major fronts. Forces on the Karelian Isthmus took a defensive stance in September, having reached the area of Lembolovo. Similarly, by October 1941, the forces of the VI Corps had formed a defensive line along – and in parts south of – the river Svir between the lakes Ladoga and Onega.

In early 1942, the Finnish high command began to view the area between Lake Ladoga and Lake Onega as too large to be managed by a single corps level headquarters, and as such ordered the creation of a new V Corps in the Svir sector. The command of the corps was given to Einar Mäkinen, who until then had led the I Corps on the Karelian Isthmus. The corps consisted of the 7th and 11th divisions on the Lake Onega end of the Svir, with the 7th Division on left. Following a series of Soviet attacks between December 1941 and April 1942, the Svir front stabilized into stationary or trench warfare.

In 1943, Mäkinen was put in charge of the National Labor Office, leaving the command of the V Corps to Antero Svensson, who had been the commander of the 7th Division until then. Under his command, the 11th Division took part in the only notable Finnish offensive action of 1943, when parts of the 11th Division, supported by artillery from the 7th Division, captured a forward Soviet base consisting of some 20 dugouts.

== On the Karelian Isthmus 1944 ==
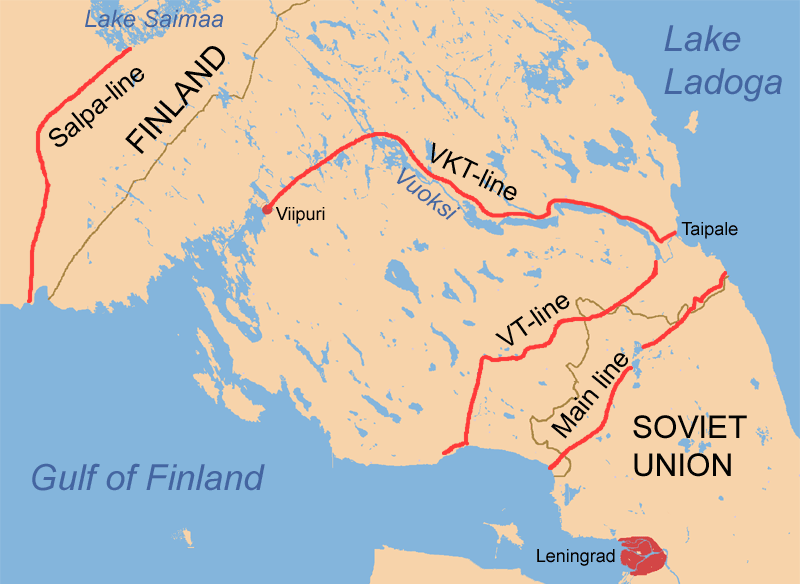
Finnish defensive lines on the Karelian Isthmus

On 9 June 1944, Soviet forces began the Vyborg–Petrozavodsk offensive by assaulting the positions of the Finnish IV Corps on the Karelian Isthmus. By then end of 10 June, the Soviets had broken the Finnish main defensive positions and pushed the Finns to the secondary VT-line. As a reaction, the Finnish high command decided to reinforce the isthmus with forces from other sectors. Soviets breached the VT-line on 14 June, and on June 15 the Finnish forces were ordered conducted a fighting retreat from the VT-line to the next defensive line, the VKT-line, where they were to take a defensive posture. The Finnish forces arrived on the VKT line by 20 June, losing Vyborg on the same day.

Due to the increased importance of the western Karelian Isthmus, effective 22 June the Finnish forces to the west of Vuoksi were divided between two corps. The western of these corps was formed around the V Corps headquarters and its corps-level assets. The V Corps consisted of the 10th and 17th infantry divisions, the Finnish Armoured Division and two brigades. Of these forces, the 10th and the Armoured Division were acting as a corps reserve. The corps was also reinforced with the German 122nd Infantry Division in the first days of July.

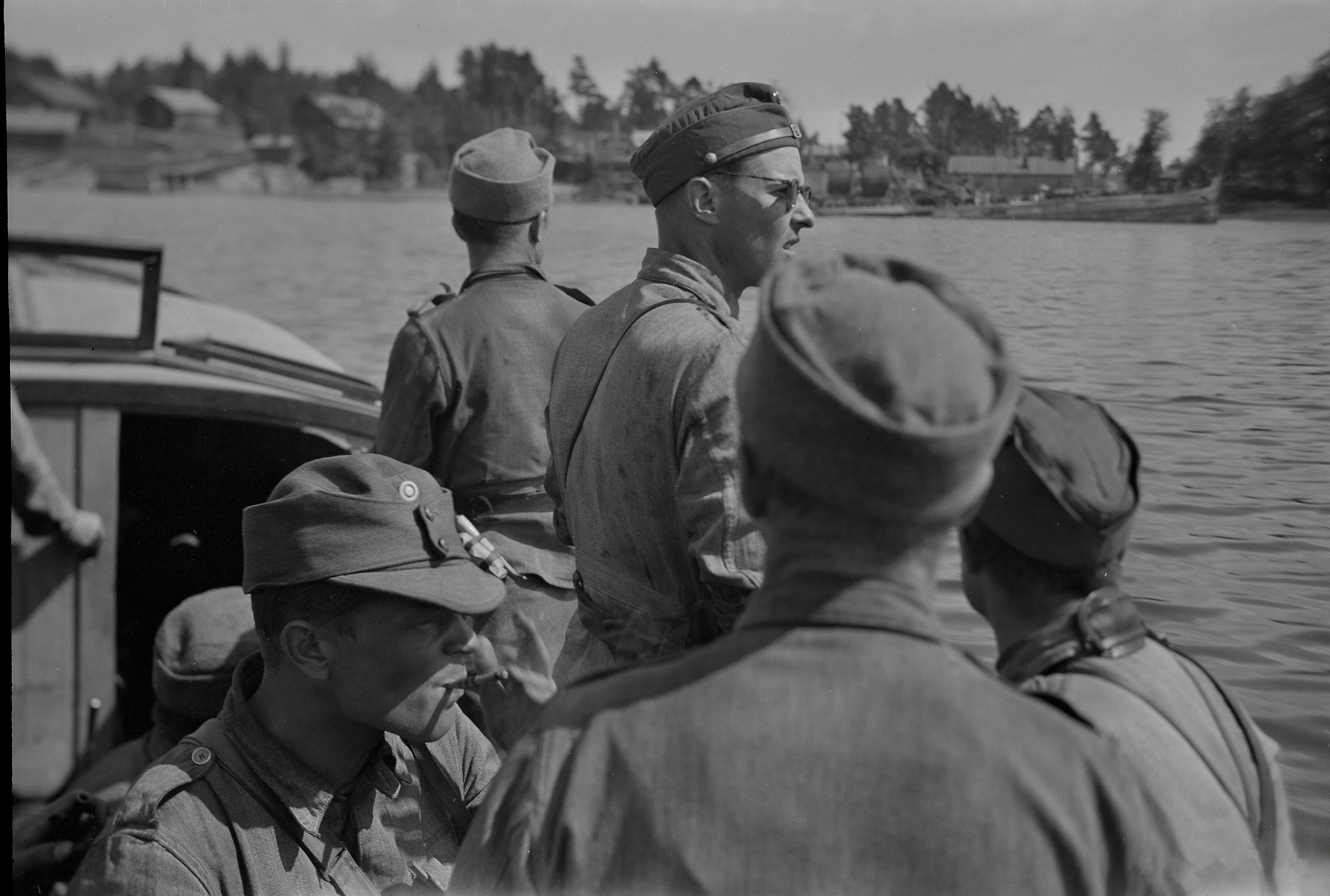
Finnish troops arriving at Ravansaari (Maly Vysotsky Island) by boat, 4 July 1944

Starting from 22 June, the Soviet Leningrad Front planned for the 59th Army to enter Finland proper via an amphibious operation over the Vyborg Bay. On the sector of the V Corps, combat relating to the operation began on the night of 30 June and 1 July with attempted Soviet landings on the islands of Suonionsaari and Maly Vysotsky Island (Finnish: Ravansaari). These initial attempts were repulsed by the Finnish artillery. In the wake of these initial attempts, the V Corps forces in the area were reinforced. The main Soviet assault began on 4 July, and quickly led to the Finns losing most of the bay islands.

Finns had found the defense of the bay difficult to organize already during the Winter War in 1939–1940. The area required coordination with the navy, and dispersal of forces to the various islands of the bay. To address the confused command structure in the coastal region, on 5 June the coastal forces of the region were combined into a division-sized element. Due to conflicting needs by the V Corps and its upper echelon, the new unit was subordinated to V Corps in part, with another part kept in reserve.

Following the capture of most of the islands in the bay, on 7 July the Soviets made multiple attempted battalion-sized landings on the Finnish side of the bay, but all attempts were repulsed. The attempts were renewed on 9 July, when forces from two Soviet divisions attempted further landings. These attempts, however, hit the sector of the German 122nd Infantry Division that had arrived on the bay on 8 July, and were repulsed completely. Following the failure of the 9 July landings, the Soviet 59th Army was ordered to halt the operation. As a result, the sector became largely passive to the end of the war, and the attempted Soviet strategic breakthrough had failed.

On 4 September 1944, V Corps consisted of the 1st Coast, 10th and 17th divisions, and the 3rd Brigade, as the Armoured Division had been made directly subordinate to the Commander of the Isthmus Forces.

== See also ==
- List of Finnish corps in the Continuation War
