= VI Corps (Finland) =

- VI Armeijakunta
- Active: 1941–1944
- Country: Finland
- Branch: Army
- Type: Corps
- Engagements: Finnish invasion of Ladoga Karelia; Finnish invasion of East Karelia (1941); Vyborg–Petrozavodsk offensive

Commanders
- Notable commanders: Paavo Talvela (1941–42); Aarne Blick (1942–44); Armas-Eino Martola (1944)

The VI Corps (Finnish: VI Armeijakunta) was a corps of the Finnish Army during the Continuation War of 1941 to 1944, where the Finnish Army fought alongside Germans against the Soviet Union. The unit was formed during a reorganization of other Finnish army corps on 29 June 1941, prior to the start of Finnish offensive operations on the night of 9–10 July.

Participating in the Finnish invasions of Ladoga Karelia and East Karelia, the corps attacked east over the Finno-Soviet border north of Lake Yanisyarvi before turning south towards Lake Ladoga. It reached the shore of Lake Ladoga in Koirinoja on 15 July, splitting in half and encircling parts of the Soviet 7th Army. The corps then continued its advance along the eastern shore of Lake Ladoga, taking Vitele and Olonets before reaching the River Svir. By the end of August 1941, VI corps was in charge of the whole Svir sector, including a bridgehead that would eventually reach a width of 100 kilometres (62 mi) and a depth of 20 kilometres (12 mi). Following a series of Soviet counter-attacks that ceased in April 1942, the corps settled in for stationary warfare.

VI Corps was on Svir sector when the Soviet Vyborg–Petrozavodsk offensive began on 21 June 1944. During this offensive, its commander, General Aarne Blick, ordered an unsanctioned retreat following a Soviet landing behind the corps, which resulted in his replacement by General Armas-Eino Martola. Following the signing of the Moscow Armistice on 19 September 1944, the corps was demobilized with the rest of the Finnish Army by 4 December 1944.

== Background and formation ==
The Finnish Army mobilized on 10 June 1941 in preparation for the Continuation War, the Finnish component of the German invasion of the Soviet Union. This followed Finno-German negotiation that had been ongoing from at least May 1941. As the Finnish preparations continued in the days following the start of the German invasion on 22 June, the Finnish commander-in-chief Marshal Carl Gustav Emil Mannerheim had concerns regarding the situation of the Finnish forces preparing to attack into Ladoga Karelia. With multiple corps planned to attack in three different directions, the operation was too complicated to be left uncoordinated by a higher echelon. At the same time, any attempt by the Finnish General Headquarters to directly coordinate the actions in the region would have disturbed its ability to properly supervise actions on other fronts.

As such, on 29 June Mannerheim ordered the creation of the Army of Karelia to coordinate the actions in the region. The creation of the new army headquarters resulted in a significant reordering of the corps in the region. Most notably, the single-division V Corps was disbanded, with its headquarters elements forming a new VI Corps. The command of the corps was given to Major General Paavo Talvela, who had been commanding the II Corps until that point. The newly created VI Corps consisted of the 11th and 5th Divisions and was concentrated on the Finno-Soviet border between Group O (a separate formation consisting of three brigades) and the VII Corps to its north and south, respectively. Together, these three formations formed the main body of the Army of Karelia. VI Corps held a sector of the border in the areas of Tuupovaara and Onkamo, with the 5th Division on the left (north-east) and the 11th Division on the right (south-west).

== Invasion of Ladoga Karelia ==
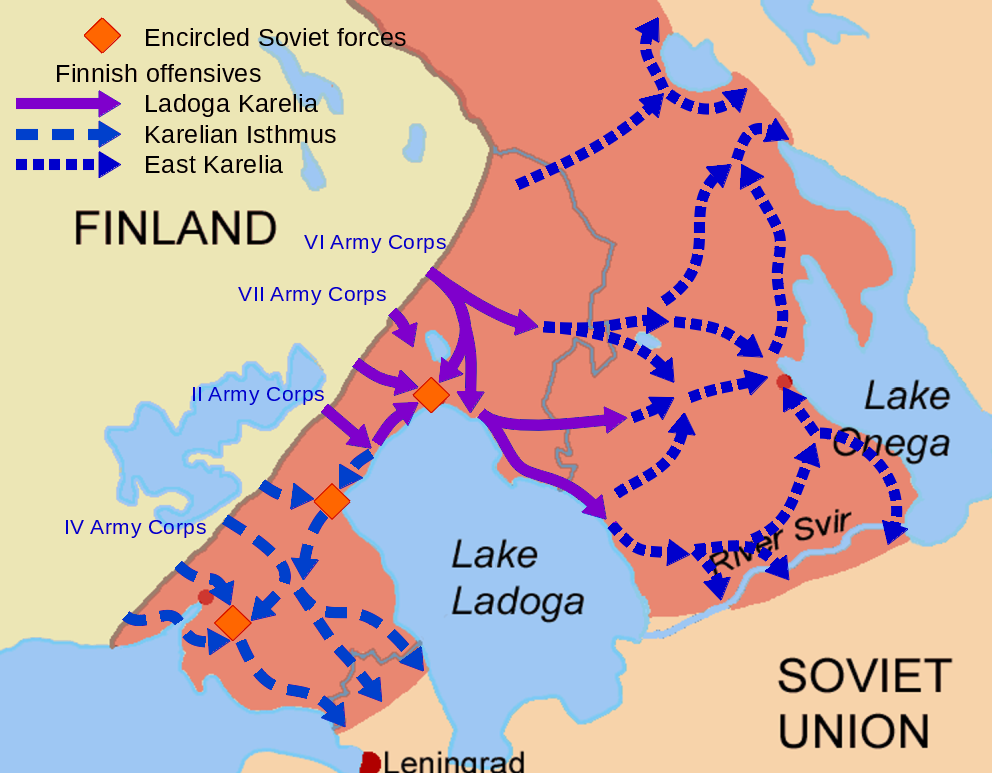
Map depicting the Finnish offensive operations in Karelia carried out in the Summer and Autumn of 1941 during Operation Barbarossa. The furthest advance of Finnish units and borders for both before and after the Winter War are shown.

The Army of Karelia's plan for the 1941 Finnish invasion of Ladoga Karelia was to break the enemy lines north of Lake Yanisyarvi, destroying enemy formations on the isthmus between Lake Ladoga and Lake Yanisyarvi. The attack would then continue to the Svir and Lake Onega. As part of this operation, VI Corps would have the 11th Division attack south towards Lake Yanisyarvi between Vyartsilya and Korpiselkä, while the 5th Division initially attacked Korpiselkä and Tjokki, from where it would continue to Uuksu via Lake Tolvayarvi.

The Finnish assault started with an artillery preparation on 9 July at 23:40, with the Finnish infantry pushing off 28 minutes later. The Finns, however, had trouble concentrating forces and directing artillery and the attack soon slowed down, with battles in the region of Korpiselkä causing delays of 19 to 20 hours. Around mid-day 11 July, the 5th Division commander was replaced by Ruben Lagus, who was now the commander of both the 5th Division and the 1st Jäger Brigade, the latter of which belonged to Group O. During 12 July, the combined force of the 5th Division and the 1st Jäger Brigade reached Lake Tolvayarvi and an area some 5 kilometres (3.1 mi) north of Uuksu, with Uuksu itself falling to the Finns on the morning of 13 July. The same day, 11th Division reached the area north of Lake Yanisyarvi.

Following these successes, VI Corps's commander, Talvela, requested new orders from the commander of the Army of Karelia, General Erik Heinrichs. The corps was given a new objective in the form of the Suistamo–Loimola railway line. The corps's advance units were to take and hold the railway as well as railway bridges in Hämekoski, which would disturb the supply lines of the Soviet forces delaying the VII Corps to the west of Lake Yanisyarvi. On 13 July, the corps was given orders to take Loimola and then attack towards Koirinoja on the shore of Lake Ladoga.

While the 11th Division continued to be engaged in the area north of Lake Yanisyarvi, the 5th Division took Loimola on 14 July. Lagus's forces reached Koirinoja and the shore of Lake Ladoga early on the morning of 15 July, thus splitting in two the Soviet 7th Army, with parts of the 168th and 71st Divisions being cut off north of Lake Ladoga. Also on 15 July, Finnish forces took up blocking positions 10–15 kilometres (6.2–9.3 mi) east of Loimola. The 11th Division took up positions along the Jänisjoki, preventing the cut-off Soviet formations from breaking out to the east.

== Advance to the Svir ==
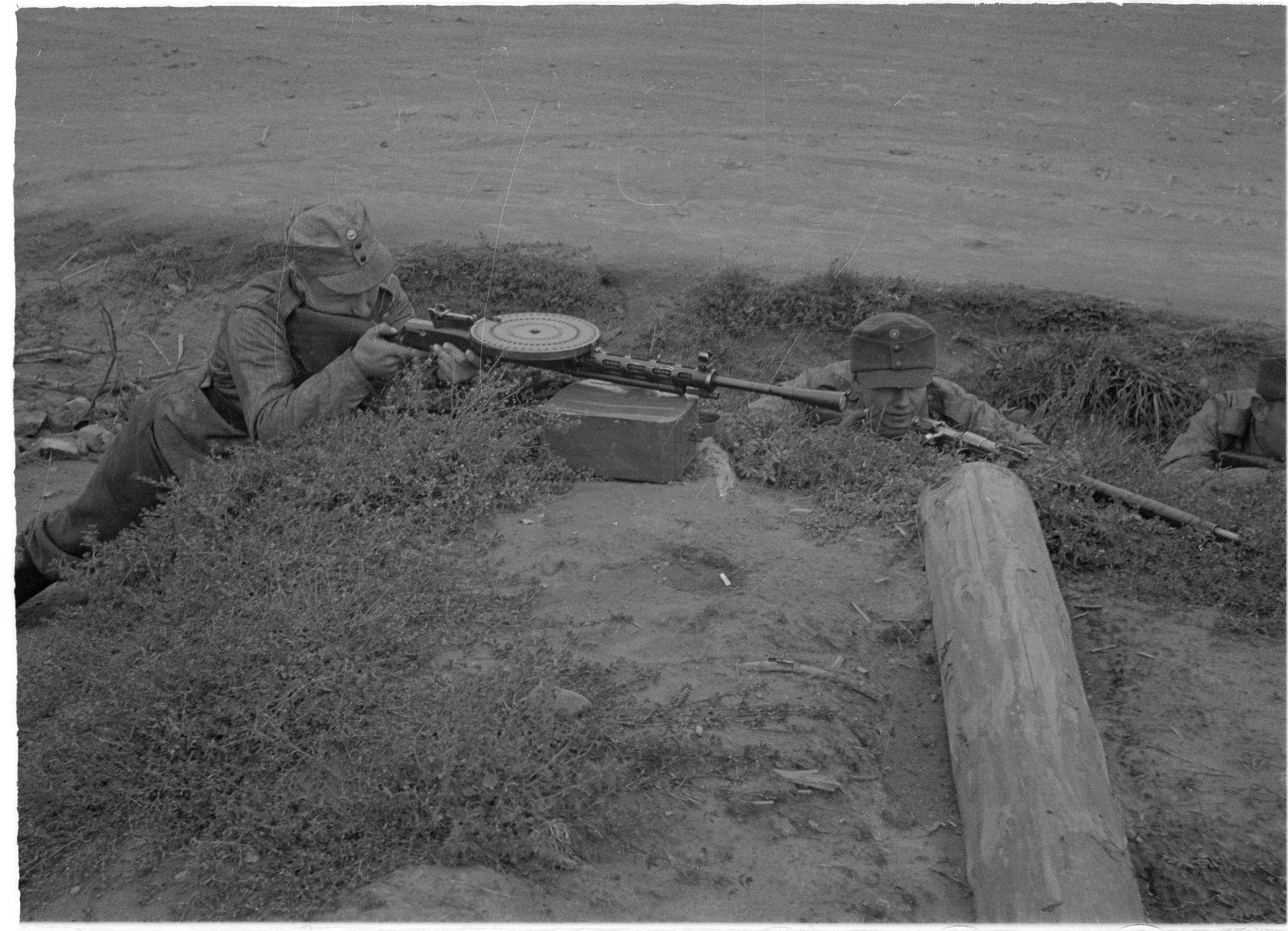
Finnish soldiers during the capture of Vitele, 1941

Having reached Lake Ladoga, the 5th Division continued south along the eastern shore of the lake. By 19 July 1941, the Army of Karelia was concerned about possible encirclement by a combination of landings from the lake and Soviet forces counter-attacking from the east, and so ordered the VI Corps to not advance beyond the Vitele-Vedlozero line. On 20 July, VI corps was ordered to cover parts of the Lake Ladoga coast. However, due to a lack of Finnish forces available for coastal defense, the Soviet 4th Naval Infantry Brigade was able to land on the Lunkulansaari Island. An attempt to land further troops was repulsed by the Finns on 25 July, and the island was cleared completely of Soviet forces on 26 July. The Finns continued by counter-attacking Soviet forces who had landed on Mantsinsaari Island on 27 July and by repulsing a further landing attempt on 28 July.

Concurrently with these actions, the reinforced 5th Division continued south along the shore of the lake, taking Vitele on 24 July. The Finns attempted to cut off Soviets retreating from Vitele, but failed to do so. By mid-July, VI Corps was holding a line spanning from the River Tuloksa to Säntämä. Ordered to not advance further, the corps would hold this sector until 4 September while repulsing several Soviet counter-attacks from the forces of the Soviet 7th Army.

On 30 August, the commander of the Army of Karelia gave VI corps new orders: The corps was to advance to the Svir while keeping its left flank secure along the line Kotkozero-Vahoijärvi. This task was simplified by the presence of the German 163rd Infantry Division. While not subordinated to the VI Corps, it followed behind ready to advance towards its flank if needed. On 4 September, the corps, consisting at this point of the 5th and 17th Divisions and reinforced by a regiment from the 7th Division, launched its attack. It was opposed by the Soviet 3rd Division, 3rd Naval Infantry Brigade, and two regiments, of which the 3rd Naval Infantry Brigade and the two regiments were in the region the Finns had chosen as the focus of their assault over the Säntämäjoki River. By the morning of 5 September, the Finns had broken the Soviet line and opened the road to the city of Olonets, which fell the same evening.

By 8 September, VI corps had reached the Svir at Kuuttilahti, Lodeynoye Pole and the Svir railway station. By reaching the latter, the Finns had technically cut the Murmansk railroad, but this was not meaningful for the supply of Murmansk because another line had been completed from Obozersky to Belomorsk during the winter of 1941. The Finns crossed the Svir on September 12, establishing a bridgehead that would eventually reach a width of 100 kilometres (62 mi) and a depth of 20 kilometres (12 mi).

== Defending the Svir ==
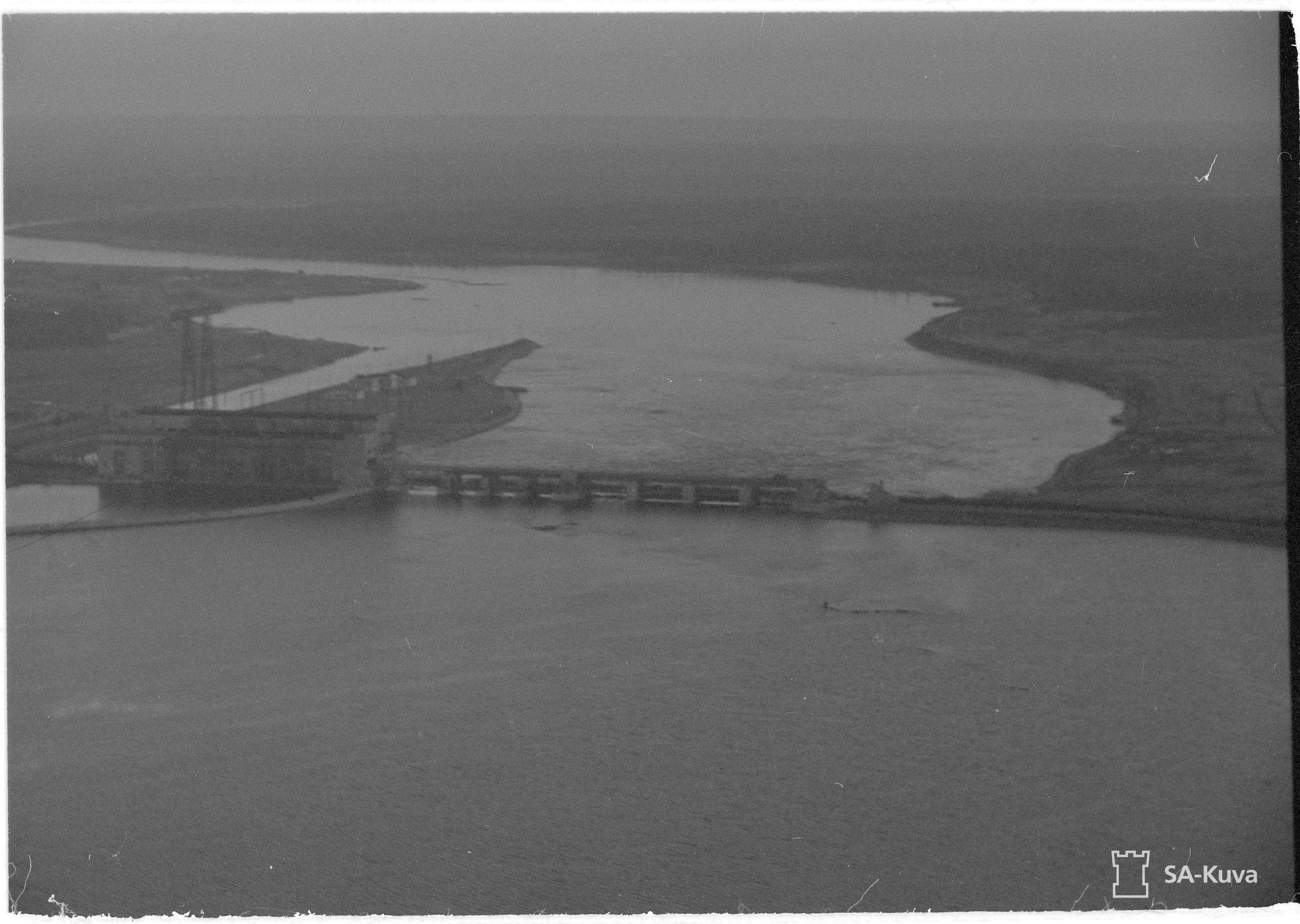
Aerial view of the Svir Hydroelectric Station, 1943

By the end of August 1941, VI corps was in charge of the whole Svir sector, covering the river and the bridgehead with a force consisting of the 11th, 5th, 17th and 7th Divisions. Opposite them were the Soviet 3rd Naval Infantry Brigade and the 314th, 21st, 114th and 272nd Divisions of the Soviet 7th Separate Army.

In addition, the German 163rd Division stood behind the 11th Division on the shore of Lake Ladoga, but was not subordinated to the VI Corps. The division had been brought into the area in preparation for the "handshake at Svir", where Finnish troops advancing from the north would link up with German troops advancing from the southwest. The task of the 163rd Division would have been to cover the flanks of the link up. The division was moved away from the sector later, once it had become clear both that the German forces would not be able to reach the Svir from the south, and that the Finns were hesitant to advance southwards themselves.

By January 1942, the Finnish General HQ viewed the Svir front as being too large a sector to be managed by a single corps level formation and on 24 January ordered the creation of the V Corps. This took control of the eastern Svir sector on 18 February. On 1 March these two corps, together with the VII Corps defending the shore of Lake Onega, formed the new Aunus Group, while the Army of Karelia was officially disbanded. In this new organization, VI corps consisted of the 5th and 17th divisions. Facing southwards, to their right (west) was the German 163rd Division and to their left (east) the V Corps. Also during January 1942, Talvela was replaced by Major General Aarne Blick.

Between December 1941 and April 1942, the Soviets launched multiple counter-attacks on the Svir sector. An attack launched on 11 April 1942, created a dangerous breach in the Šelmenitša-Pertjärvi area. The breach was under control on 22 April, but the defense had involved 16 Finnish battalions and cost them 2165 casualties, including 440 killed. The Soviet counter-attacks largely stopped in April 1942, and the Svir front stabilized into stationary or trench warfare.

== Soviet Vyborg–Petrozavodsk offensive ==
Following various changes in the corps's subordinate units, including a brief time in 1943 with the Finnish Armoured Division in the line, on 31 May 1944 the corps consisted of the 15th Brigade and the 5th, 8th and 17th Divisions. In this configuration, it was struck by the Soviet Vyborg–Petrozavodsk offensive on 21 June, while the Finns were in the process of pulling back their forces to the northern side of the Svir.

A Soviet landing in Tuloksa soon put the corps in danger of being cut off. The VI Corps commander, Blick, requested permission to pull back from his now-superior Talvela, who refused and ordered the corps to conduct a delaying action. Blick cut communications with Talvela, gave orders to fall back, and only re-established communications once it was too late to countermand his orders. This caused significant animosity between Talvela and Blick, and resulted in the replacement of Blick by Armas-Eino Martola on 6 July. According to historian Antti Juutilainen, Blick's actions "saved his men".

VI Corps retreated to the northern shores of Lake Ladoga, taking positions on a partially complete defensive line called the U-line (Finnish: U-asema) between 8 and 11 July. The line spanned from Pitkyaranta to Loimola. There, Soviet forces attempted to encircle the VI Corps by flanking them from the north, via Ilomantsi. This led to the Battle of Ilomantsi, where the Soviet forces were instead encircled themselves, forcing the Soviet 32nd Army to focus on rescue efforts rather than continue the offensive.

== Demobilization ==
Following Finnish victories in the battles of Tali–Ihantala, Vyborg Bay and Ilomantsi, Soviet forces from the Finnish front were redirected to other fronts and the situation stabilized with VI Corps still holding the U-line position. On 27 July, the Soviets informed the neutral Swedes that they would be ready to negotiate for a peace that allowed for Finnish independence. On the morning of 4 September, Finnish forces began to observe a cease-fire, as agreed during Finno-Soviet negotiations over the preceding two weeks. The Soviets began to observe the cease-fire 25 hours later, at 08:00 on 5 September. At this point, the VI Corps consisted of the 5th and 8th Divisions.

Already during the late evening of 4 September, IV Corps had been ordered to prepare to take up new positions on the Finnish side of the border established in the Moscow Peace Treaty, which had ended the Finno-Soviet Winter War waged between late 1939 and early 1940. The corps was to take a defensive position in the region between lakes Simpelejärvi and Kiteenjärvi with orders to repulse any Soviet attacks. The Moscow Armistice was signed on 19 September 1944, ending the war between the Finland and the Soviet Union. On that same day, VI Corps began its march towards the Simpelejärvi-Kiteenjärvi area, with the whole of the corps crossing to the Finnish side of the border within a week.

According to the original Soviet demands, Finnish forces were to be demobilized within two months. However, the situation was complicated by the concurrent Soviet demands that the Finns remove the German forces remaining in northern Finland. Following a 12 October letter from the Allied Control Commission, a plan for the demobilization was finalized by 20 October and presented to the Soviets – following translation difficulties – on 22 October. As a result of disagreements regarding the strength and composition of the post-war Finnish army, the plan had not been approved by the start of November. This was of significant concern for the Finns, as time was running out for completing the demobilization by the original 5 December deadline while the Lapland War, the removal of remaining German forced from northern Finland, continued. The Soviet delegation approved a modified demobilization plan on 5 November, requiring the demobilization to begin by 8 November with a deadline of 5 December for the demobilization to be completed. The demobilization of the Finnish Army was completed by 4 December 1944. The VI Corps HQ's war diary ends on 3 December 1944, with a note that the corps headquarters has been disbanded. The final timestamped entry is a situation report sent at 19:40 on that same date.
