= I Corps (Finland, Continuation War) =

- I Armeijakunta
- Active: 1941–1942
- Country: Finland
- Branch: Army
- Type: Corps
- Engagements: Continuation War; Finnish invasion of Ladoga Karelia; Finnish invasion of the Karelian Isthmus

Commanders
- Notable commanders: Einar Mäkinen

The I Corps (Finnish: I Armeijakunta) refers to several short-lived units of the Finnish Army before and during the Continuation War. The longest-lived I Corps participated in both the Finnish invasion of Ladoga Karelia and the Finnish invasion of the Karelian Isthmus in 1941 before being disbanded in early 1942, before being re-designated V Corps.

== First Formation ==
The wartime I Corps headquarters was first formed during the early June 1941 mobilization of the Finnish army from the peacetime headquarters of the Finnish Border Guard. Located in Riihimäki, the headquarters-only corps had no operational units assigned to it. On 29 June 1941, it was ordered to form the Army of Karelia under the command of General Erik Heinrichs.

== Second Formation ==
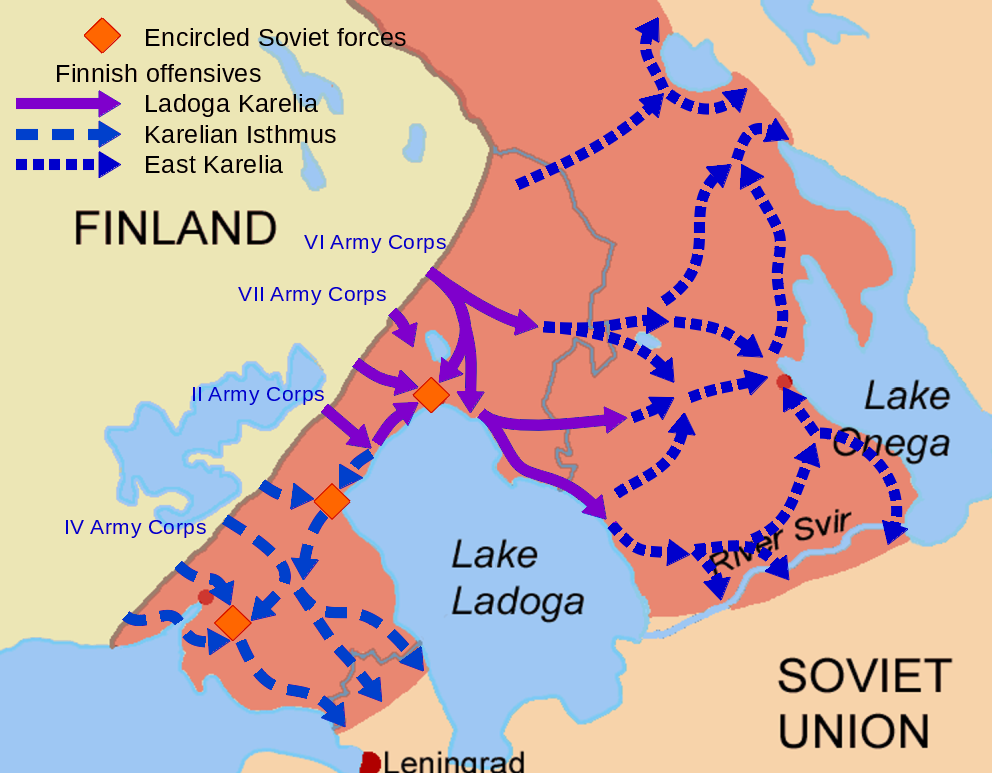
Map of Finnish offensive operations in Karelia.

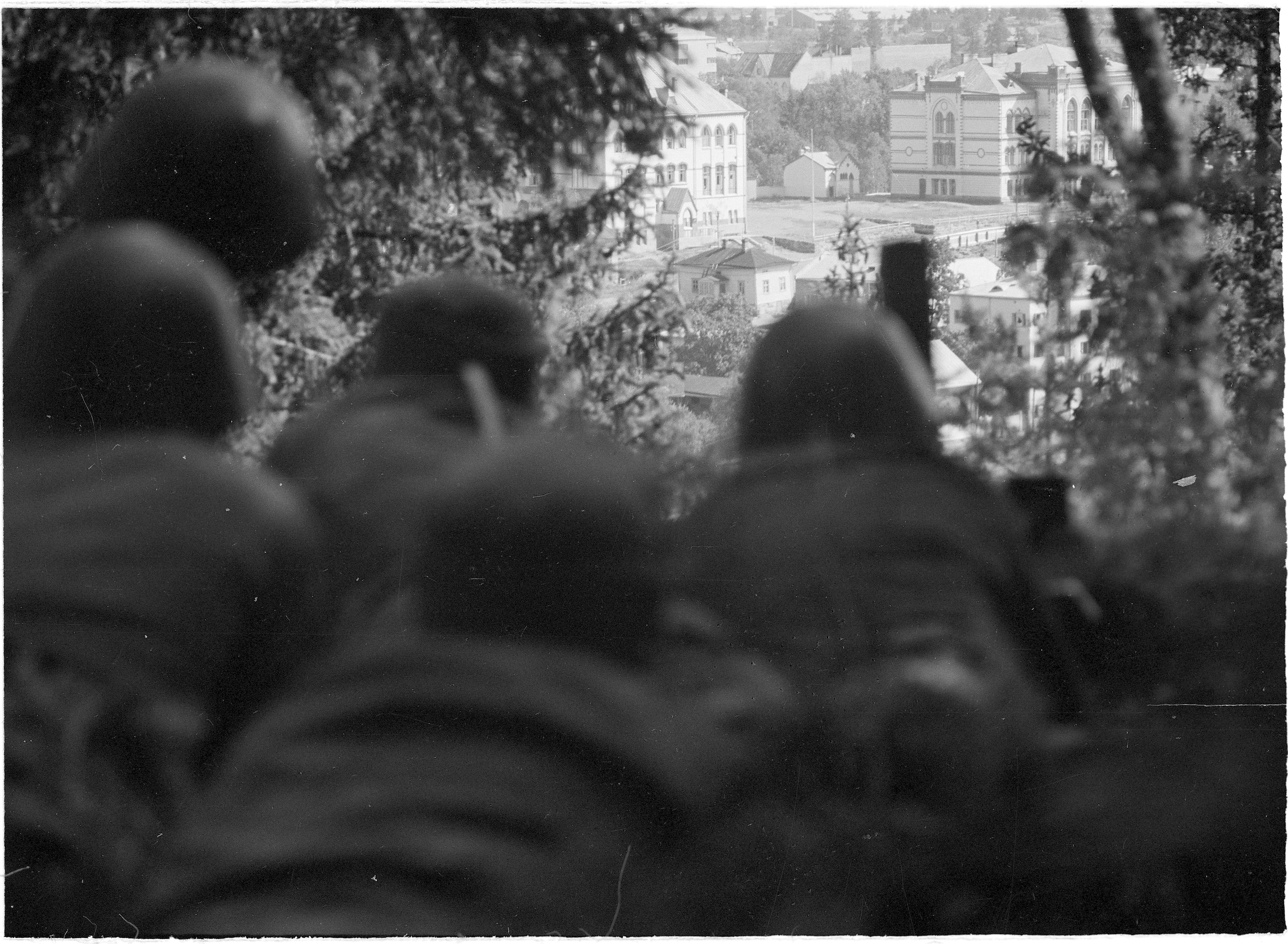
Finnish anti-tank troops during the capture of Sortavala, 1941

The corps was re-formed on 8 August 1941 under the command of Lieutenant General Einar Mäkinen during the Finnish invasion of Ladoga Karelia to clarify the command structure in the area northwest of Lake Ladoga. The creation of this new formation allowed the Army of Karelia to focus on the capture of areas east of Ladoga. Consisting of the 7th, 19th and 2nd divisions, the corps was tasked with the containment and destruction of the reinforced Soviet 168th Rifle Division surrounded in the area of Sortavala. Following this, the corps was to organize coastal defenses on the shore of Ladoga and release one division for action to its east. The rest of the corps was to continue to the Karelian Isthmus. A significant concern for the Finnish command was to prevent the encircled Soviet forces from escaping over Lake Ladoga, as the area held by the 168th Division provided good opportunities for the loading of troops and materiel.

I Corps took operational control on 13 August and by the end of 15 August parts of the 7th Division had taken control of Sortavala, capturing approximately 540 prisoners of war in the process. This left the bulk of the Soviet 168th Division trapped along the shore of Ladoga between Lahdenpohja and Sortavala. From 15 to 20 August, forces of I Corps continued to assault the Soviet forces, who however managed to ship out significant amounts of both forces and materiel. The area of operations was in Finnish hands by 20 August, with the forces of the Soviet 168th having escaped over the lake, and those parts that had failed to do so destroyed. On 21 August, the 7th Division was released from the corps to act as a strategic reserve in the Sortavala region, while the 2nd Division was transferred to the Karelian Isthmus. The 19th Division followed the 2nd Division on 23 August.

Following the operations in the Sortavala region, the corps's organization underwent significant change as its divisions were transferred to other units. In turn, the 10th and 15th divisions were transferred from II Corps to I Corps. The corps headquarters was thus moved to the Karelian Isthmus, where it participated in the Finnish invasion of the Karelian Isthmus. The 10th Division was engaged in the area between the river Vuoksi and Lake Krasnoye, while the 15th Division was in the area of river Vuoksi and Lake Sukhodolskoye on the northern side of the river. On 27 August, the corps continued the attack towards Leningrad, eventually reaching an area between Lembolovo and Lake Ladoga, where it halted and prepared a defensive posture beginning from 9 September.

On 20 January 1942, the Finnish commander-in-chief, Marshal Carl Gustaf Emil Mannerheim, ordered that all the forces on the Karelian Isthmus were to be subordinated to the IV Corps headquarters, which was re-designated Isthmus Group (Finnish: Kannaksen ryhmä) on 1 March. This transfer of forces was completed on 1 February, and a few days later the I Corps headquarters – together with commander Mäkinen – were moved to the Svir sector, where they formed the headquarters for the V Corps.

== See also ==
- Finnish I Corps (Winter War)
- List of Finnish corps in the Continuation War
