= List of Finnish corps in the Continuation War =

This is a list of Finnish corps that existed during the Continuation War, 1941–1944.

- I Corps
- II Corps
- III Corps
- IV Corps
- V Corps
- VI Corps
- VII Corps

== See also ==
- Finnish Army
- List of Finnish corps in the Winter War
- List of Finnish divisions in the Continuation War
- List of Finnish divisions in the Winter War
