= IV Corps (Finland, Continuation War) =

Finnish military unit during the Continuation War

- IV Armeijakunta
- Active: 1941; 1944
- Country: Finland
- Branch: Army
- Type: Corps
- Engagements: Finnish invasion of the Karelian Isthmus; Battle of Porlampi; Vyborg–Petrozavodsk offensive; Battle of Tali-Ihantala

Commanders
- Notable commanders: Karl Lennart Oesch (1941); Taavetti Laatikainen (1944)

The IV Corps (Finnish: IV Armeijakunta) was a unit of the Finnish Army during the Continuation War. During the 1941 Finnish invasion of the Karelian Isthmus, it encircled three Soviet divisions in the area south of Vyborg before being renamed as Isthmus Group (Finnish: Kannaksen ryhmä).

Reconstituted in 1944, the corps was the target of the spearhead of the Soviet Vyborg–Petrozavodsk offensive. Elements of the corps fought in the decisive Battle of Tali-Ihantala at the end of the war.

== Mobilization and early defensive operations ==
Commanded by Lieutenant General Karl Lennart Oesch, IV Corps was formed around the headquarters of the peace-time II Corps. It consisted originally of the 4th, 8th, and 12th divisions which were mobilized in South-Eastern Finland in the vicinity of Hamina, Suur-Miehikkälä, Anjala and Luumäki. The corps was formed from reservists of Kymi, Uusimaa and Helsinki regions.

The corps was initially tasked with defending an area spanning from the Virolahti at the Gulf of Finland to Kuurmanpohja near Joutseno. For this purpose, it was also given command of the 2nd Coastal Brigade. Soon after, it also receiving the 10th Division from the disbanded V Corps.

On 28 June, a few days before taking command of the 10th Division, the IV Corps was given orders to plan for an offensive. Despite these orders, the IV Corps stayed on the defence for almost two months, even as other Finnish corps began offensive operations. During this time, it released several units, most notably the 10th Division, to other nearby corps.

== 1941 invasion of the Karelian Isthmus ==
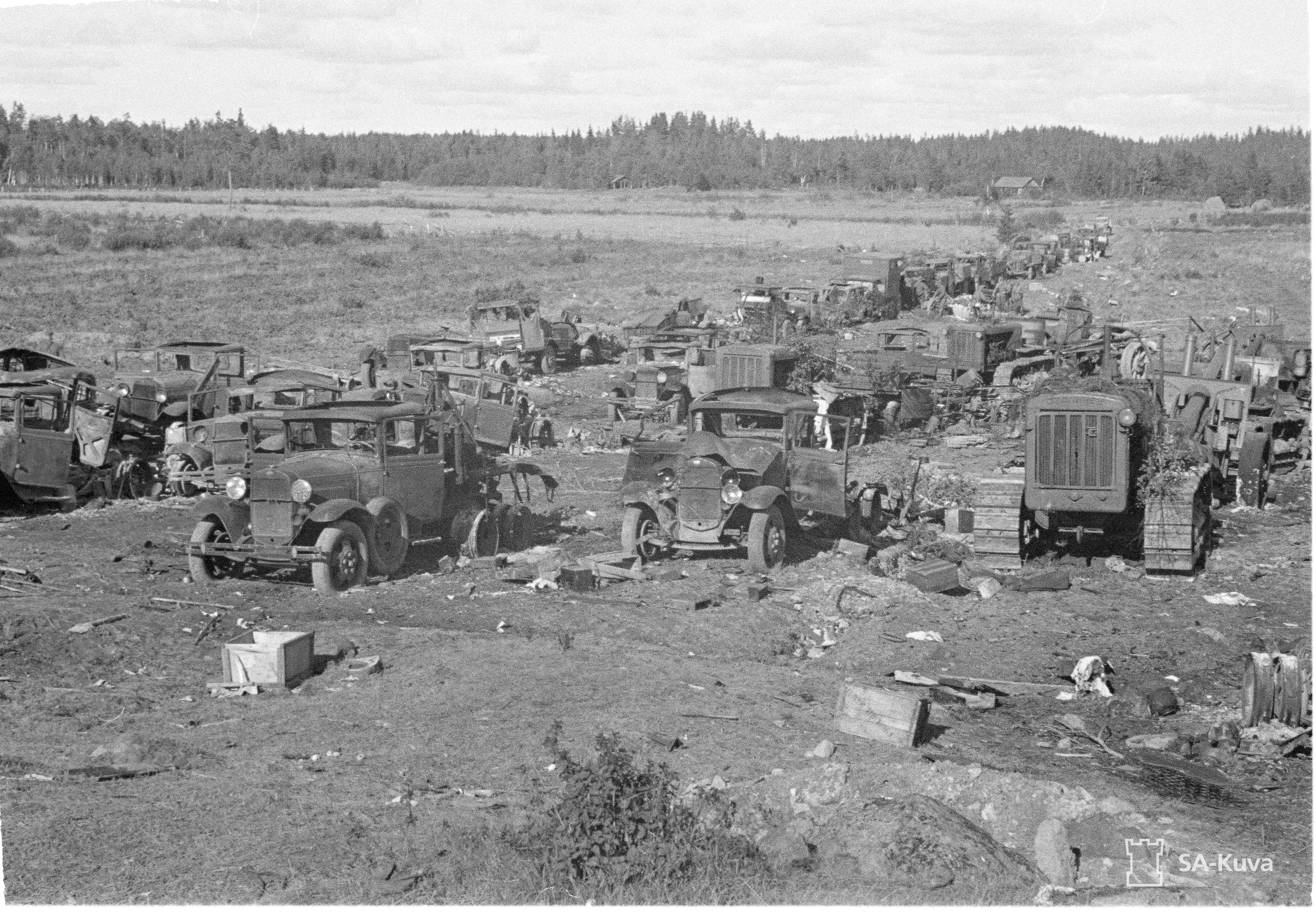
Soviet equipment captured as a result of the Porlammi pocket, 1941.

The Finnish high command had planned for IV Corps to go on the offensive only after II Corps had advanced to river Vuoksi. This would enable the Finns to flank and surround Soviet forces defending on the western Karelian Isthmus. Indeed, following the Soviet 23rd Army's withdrawal from Vyborg, parts of IV Corps began to pursue them towards the pre-Winter War border. Concurrently, the 8th Division conducted an amphibious landing to Lokhaniemi, south of Vyborg. This, together with a by-land envelopment conducted by the 4th and 12th divisions, resulted in the pocketing of the Soviet 43rd, 115th and 123rd divisions following the Battle of Porlampi. This was the largest pocket created by the Finns in either the Winter War or the Continuation War, resulting in the capture of some 3000 prisoners of war, including the commander of the Soviet 43rd Division, Major General Kirpichnikov. Other sources state that the combat actions south of Vyborg resulted in a total of 9000 Soviet prisoners of war and 7000 dead left in the area, while the Finns suffered approximately 3000 casualties.

While the Porlammi pocket was still being eliminated, parts of IV Corps continued southwards. Forces of the IV and II Corps reached the pre-Winter War border in the last days of August, soon after which they took a generally defensive stance with units from the region transferred to other theaters of war or to strategic reserve. On 15 October 1941, the IV Corps consisted of the 12th, 2nd, 18th and 19th Divisions positioned on the western half of the Karelian Isthmus. Also on the isthmus was the I Corps, consisting of the 10th and 15th Divisions.

The Finns refused several German demands for a Finnish attack on Leningrad. Instead, in late August 1941, the Finnish High Command decided to demobilize older personnel. These efforts began in the IV Corps in October, resulting in the demobilization of 4549 men by end of November. A further 6119 men were demobilized from the IV Corps in January 1942. This involved the disbandment of the 12th and 19th Divisions.

In March 1942, all forces on the Karelian Isthmus came under the command of IV Corps and, on 25 February 1942, the Finnish high command ordered the corps to be renamed as Isthmus Group (Finnish: Kannaksen Ryhmä). The group consisted of the 18th (on right, on the coast of Gulf of Finland), 2nd, 10th and 15th (on left, by the coast of Lake Ladoga) Divisions, as well as the 8th Coastal Brigade.

== 1944 Soviet offensive ==
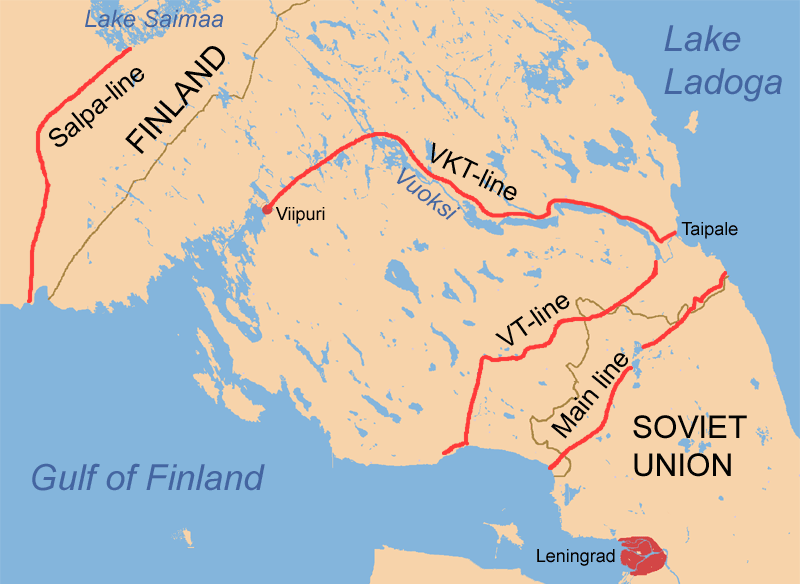
Finnish defensive lines on the Karelian Isthmus.

The fall of the siege of Leningrad in early 1944 allowed Soviet forces to be moved to Finnish sectors. As such, the Finnish high command decided to reform IV Corps on 16 February 1944 under the command of Lieutenant General Taavetti Laatikainen on the western Karelian Isthmus. To the left (east) of IV Corps was formed III Corps, which took command of the 15th Division and the 19th Brigade.

Consisting initially of only the 2nd and 18th Divisions, the Cavalry Brigade, and Coastal Artillery Regiment 2, the reformed IV Corps was hit by the spearhead of the Soviet Vyborg–Petrozavodsk offensive on 10 June 1944. The attack immediately broke the Finnish line, and forced IV Corps to fall back to the VT-line, which the Soviets reached on 11 June 1944, breaching it on the IV Corps's sector on 14 June.

On June 17, the Finnish forces were ordered to fall back to the VKT-line while fighting a delaying action. IV Corps reached this line on 20 June. By now, Finnish forces on the sector of the IV Corps included a total of six divisions and three brigades. The Finns lost Vyborg already on 20 June, after which V Corps took over the front along the Vyborg Bay to right of IV Corps.

By 24 June, the IV Corps had been able to form a cohesive defense. However, on 15 June, Soviet units pierced the Finnish line on the sector of the 18th Division. This Soviet penetration led eventually to the decisive Battle of Tali–Ihantala. By 5-7 July, it had become clear to the Finns that the Soviet offensive had been blunted, with Soviet forces seen preparing defensive positions. This, in turn, allowed the Finns to transfer forces to other sectors. Indeed, the Soviet Leningrad Front took a defensive stance in mid-July, and transferred three Soviet corps to other sectors. The situation on the IV Corps's front stabilized seeing only few attacks of smaller formations up to the size of a battalion.

On 2 September, Finno-Soviet negotiations for peace resulted in an agreement for a cease fire, which the Finns began observing at 07:00 on 4 September. Soviet forces began to observe the cease fire on 5 September at 07:00. Following the Moscow Armistice of 19 September, Finnish forces moved behind the new Finno-Soviet border, with all Finnish troops on the Finnish side of the border by 28 September.

== Demobilization ==
According to the original Soviet demands, Finnish forces were to be demobilized within two months. However, the situation was complicated by the concurrent Soviet demands that the Finns remove the German forces remaining in northern Finland. Following a 12 October letter from the Allied Control Commission, a plan for the demobilization was finalized by 20 October and presented to the Soviets – following translation difficulties – on 22 October. As a result of disagreements regarding the strength and composition of the post-war Finnish army, the plan had not been approved by the start of November. This was of significant concern for the Finns, as time was running out for completing the demobilization by the original 5 December deadline while the Lapland War, the removal of remaining German forced from northern Finland, continued. The Soviet delegation approved a modified demobilization plan on 5 November, requiring the mobilization to begin by 8 November with a deadline of 5 December for the demobilization to be completed. The demobilization of the Finnish Army was completed by 4 December 1944.

The war diary of the IV Corps Headquarters' Operations Section notes that a closing ceremony of the corps headquarters was held on 23 November 1944.

== See also ==
- Finnish IV Corps (Winter War)
- List of Finnish corps in the Continuation War
