= Baryshevo =

Baryshevo (Russian: Барышево) is the name of several rural localities in Russia:

- Baryshevo, Leningrad Oblast, a logging depot settlement in Goncharovskoye Settlement Municipal Formation of Vyborgsky District of Leningrad Oblast
- Baryshevo, Nizhny Novgorod Oblast, a village in Nikolo-Pogostinsky Selsoviet of Gorodetsky District of Nizhny Novgorod Oblast
- Baryshevo, Novosibirsk Oblast, a selo in Novosibirsky District of Novosibirsk Oblast
