= 2nd Division (Finland) =

- 2. Divisioona
- Active: 1941–1944
- Country: Finland
- Branch: Army
- Type: Division
- Engagements: Continuation War; Finnish invasion of Ladoga Karelia; Vyborg–Petrozavodsk offensive

Commanders
- Notable commanders: Aarne Blick; Ilmari Martola

The 2nd Division (Finnish: 2. Divisioona) was a unit of the Finnish Army during the Continuation War. It participated in the Finnish invasion of Ladoga Karelia at the start of the war and defended against the 1944 Soviet Vyborg–Petrozavodsk offensive on the Karelian Isthmus where it suffered heavy casualties.

== History ==
Subordinated to the II Corps, the division participated in the Finnish invasion of Ladoga Karelia on the northwestern shore of Lake Ladoga under the command of Colonel Aarne Blick. During the initial invasion, it took part in an encirclement of Soviet forces along the northern shore of Lake Ladoga, reaching the shore of the lake on 7 August. During a subsequent reorganization of the Finnish forces in the region, it was subordinated to the Finnish I Corps, participating soon after in a pincer movement aimed at the capture of Sortavala. While Soviet forces were largely able to escape encirclement, the town was captured by Finnish forces on 15 August.

In June and July 1944, the division suffered heavy casualties during the Soviet Vyborg–Petrozavodsk offensive under the command of Major General Ilmari Martola, who had taken command in 1942. Part of the IV Corps, it was located on the western Karelian Isthmus. It first fell back to the VT-line, where it held off Soviet attacks for four days before being ordered to retreat from those positions on the evening of 12 June.

The division eventually took up positions on the VKT-line in the Äyräpää-Vuosalmi sector as part of the III Corps. Despite temporal breach of the Finnish line at Vuosalmi, the Finns stabilized the situation and held the VKT Line of defenses. Actions in the sector quieted down, with both sides settling for trench warfare in mid-July. The war came to an end with the signing of the Moscow Armistice on 19 August 1944.
