= Taavetti Laatikainen =

Finnish general (1886–1954)

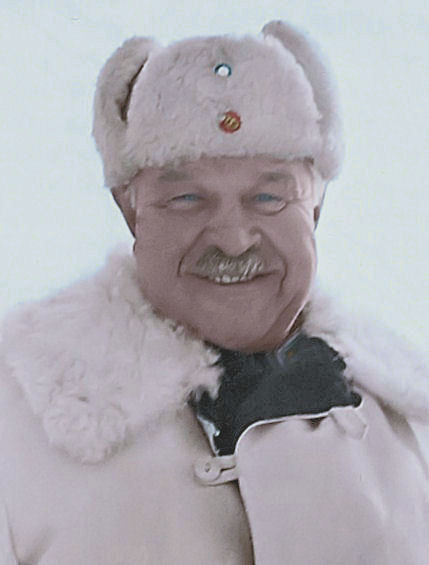
- Laatikainen, pictured some time before 1945
- Nickname: "Pappa"
- Born: 27 July 1886; Haukivuori, Grand Duchy of Finland, Russian Empire
- Died: 27 April 1954 (aged 67) Mikkeli, Finland
- Buried: Harju cemetery, Mikkeli
- Allegiance: German Empire (1916–1918); Finland (1918–1948)
- Branch: Imperial German Army; Finnish Jäger troops; Finnish Army
- Service years: 1916–1948
- Rank: General of Infantry (1948)
- Commands: Reserve Officer School (1923–27); Officer Cadet School (1927–33); 1st Division (1938–40); I Corps (1940–41); V Corps (1941); II Corps (1941); Maaselkä Group (1941–44); IV Corps (1944)
- Conflicts: World War I; Eastern Front; Finnish Civil War; Battle of Kämärä; Battle of Viipuri; World War II; Winter War; Continuation War; Finnish invasion of the Karelian Isthmus; Svir–Petrozavodsk offensive; Battle of Tali–Ihantala
- Awards: Mannerheim Cross #17; Order of the Cross of Liberty; Order of the White Rose; Order of the Star of Romania; Iron Cross; German Cross; Order of the Dannebrog; Order of the Cross of the Eagle

Taavetti Laatikainen (27 July 1886 – 15 April 1954) was a Finnish General of Infantry and a member of the Jäger movement. He fought in the Eastern Front of World War I, the Finnish Civil War, the Winter War and the Continuation War. During the last of these, he was awarded the Mannerheim Cross of Liberty 2nd Class. Before the Winter War, he commanded both the Reserve Officer School and the Officer Cadet School. He retired in 1948 from the position of Inspector of Infantry.

== Early life and Jäger Movement ==
Born to crofter parents Taneli Laatikainen and Ulla Tarkiainen in Haukivuori on 27 July 1886, Laatikainen became an ylioppilas in 1906 and graduated as a Bachelor of Philosophy in 1913. In 1912, he taught history, Finnish and Latin in Pori.

In January 1916, Laatikainen became involved with the Jäger movement, joining the 27th Royal Prussian Jäger Battalion of the imperial German Army as a volunteer. As a member of the battalion, he fought on the German side of World War I on the Eastern Front. During this time, he took part in the 1917 Battle of Riga, and was promoted to a squad leader (German: Gruppenführer).

== Before the Winter War ==
In 1918, during the Finnish Civil War, Laatikainen returned to Finland as a jäger lieutenant and took part in the civil war on the side of the Finnish Whites. He saw action in the Battle of Kämärä on 27 January 1918 and the Battle of Viipuri that was fought between 24 and 29 April 1918. He also saw combat in Lempäälä. He was made a member of the Order of the Cross of Liberty in 1918.

In 1919, Laatikainen married Julia Emilia Grönroos (1888–1967) with whom he had three children. The youngest, Esko Armas Laatikainen (born 1920) would later die during the Continuation War in 1942. His two other children were Marjatta Laatikainen (later Toivakka, born 1925) and Erkki Antero Laatikainen (born 1928), the latter of whom would reach the rank of lieutenant general in the Finnish Army.

Following the end of the civil war, he continued his military career commanding first a company and then a battalion, being promoted to the rank of captain in 1919. In 1921, he was promoted to the rank of major and made the commander of the Reserve Officer School. In 1927, he was made the commander of the Officer Cadet School, which was responsible for training war-time company commanders. While in these roles, he was made a knight of the Order of the White Rose of Finland in 1923 and promoted to a colonel in 1928. From 1933 onward, he served as a regimental (1933–37), military province (1937–1938) and finally divisional (1938–1939) commander. He was made a major general in 1938.

During this time, Laatikainen also served as a member of the Hamina city tax board from 1925 to 1926 and as a member of the Huopalahti municipal council from 1928 to 1930. He also continued to be active in the Jäger affairs, serving on the board of Jääkäriliitto (lit. Jäger Union), the Jäger heritage society from 1926 to 1930. He received the Danish Order of the Dannebrog Knight 1st Class in 1933 and the Estonian Order of the Cross of the Eagle 3rd class in 1936.

== During the Winter War and the Interim Peace ==
At the start of the Finno-Soviet Winter War in late 1939, Laatikainen was the commander of the 1st Division, which fought on the Karelian Isthmus as part of the II Corps. It is notable for having formed the left pincer of the Finnish counter-attack on 23 December 1939. The 1st Division was able to reach the area of Perkjärvi before being stopped by heavy resistance and larger Soviet armored formations. In totality, the counter-attack was a failure that resulted in some 1300 total casualties, which was approximately 1 percent of the total manpower of the Army of the Isthmus.

Laatikainen was given command of the I Corps on 21 February 1940, just a few weeks before the end of the war on 13 March 1940. He would keep this command after the end of the war, leading efforts to improve the Finnish defences in the area of Lake Kivijärvi and Saimaa. He was also a Finnish representative in the Finno-Soviet border negotiations of 1940–41.

== During Continuation War ==
In the lead-up to the Continuation War in 1941, Laatikainen's peace-time I Corps was renamed V Corps. The corps was position near the Karelian Isthmus, between the IV Corps and the II Corps. On June 29, 1941, the Finnish General HQ ordered the creation of the Army of Karelia. As part of this reorganization, the V Corps was disbanded by transferring its only division, the 10th Division, to the IV Corps and transferring the headquarters personnel to other formations. As part of this reorganization, Laatikainen was given command of the II Corps which participated in the Finnish invasion of the Karelian Isthmus by occupying the Khiytola–Elisenvaara area and thus severing the Soviet land connection north of Lake Ladoga. For his actions on the Karelian Isthmus, he was given the Mannerheim Cross of Liberty 2nd Class.

The corps was then moved to East Karelia, where it advanced to the isthmus between Medvezhyegorsk and Lake Segozero and was renamed Maaselkä Group. Laatikainen would keep this post until March 1944, when he took command of the Finnish IV Corps on the eastern Karelian Isthmus. The corps participated in the defense against the Soviet Vyborg–Petrozavodsk offensive, most notably in the Battle of Tali–Ihantala, which repulsed the Soviet strategic offensive, paving the way for a Finnish exit from the war.

In addition to the Finnish Mannerheim Cross, Laatikainen also received several foreign awards. He received the Iron Cross 2nd class in 1941, followed by an Iron Cross 1st class in 1942. In 1944, he received the German Cross in Gold. Finally, he was also the recipient of the Order of the Star of Romania.

== After the war ==
Laatikainen continued his military career after the Continuation War both as a divisional and corps commander. From 1947 to 1948, he served as the Inspector of Infantry, retiring finally in 1948 after being promoted to the rank of General of Infantry. In his retirement, Laatikainen continued to be active in heritage organizations for both the Finnish Jägers and the veterans of the Winter and Continuation Wars. In his later years he lived in Mikkeli, where he died on 15 April 1954. He is buried in the Harju cemetery in Mikkeli.
