= Jänisjoki =

Jänisjoki, Yanisyoki
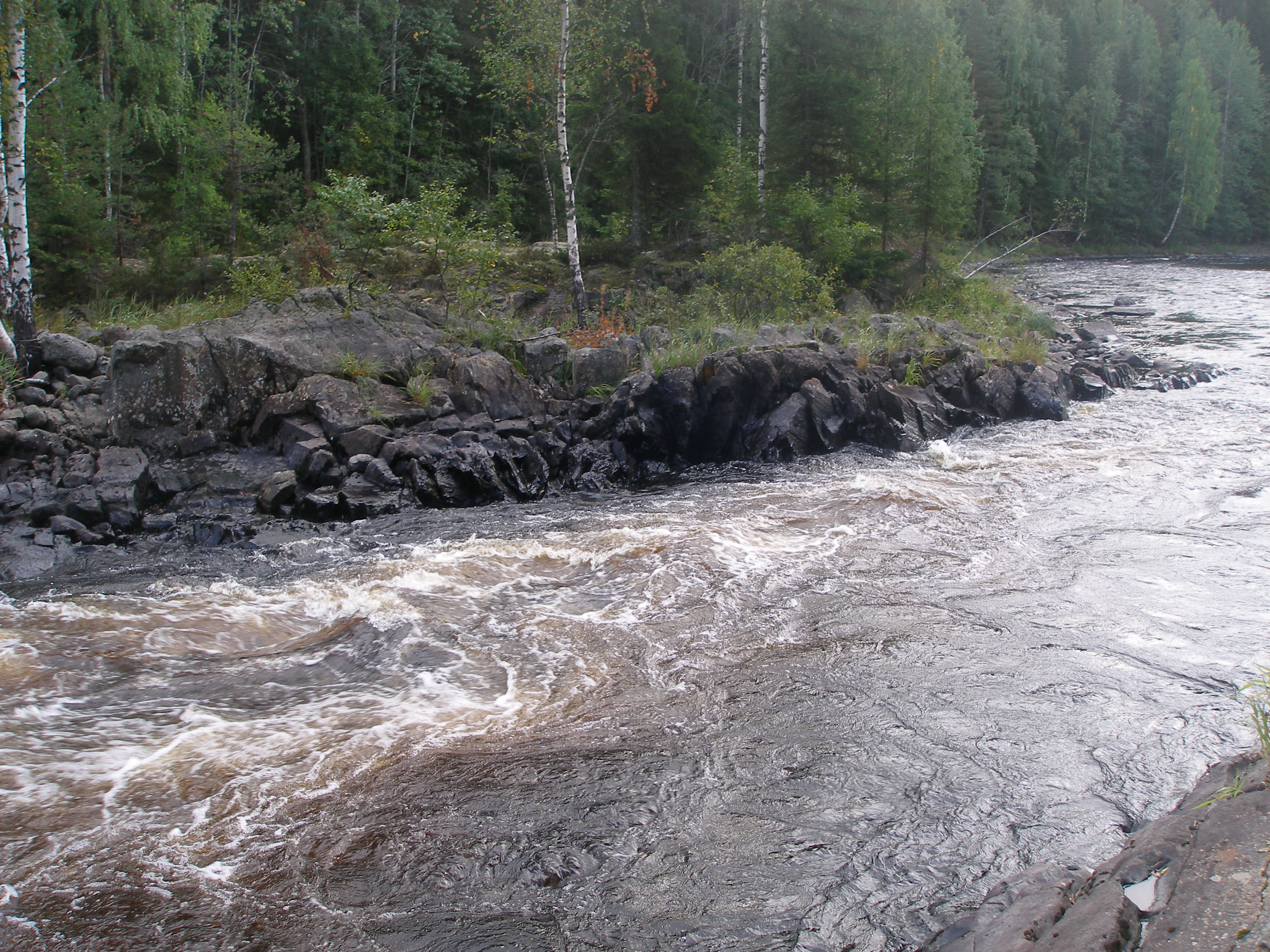

Location
- Countries: Finland; Russia

Physical characteristics
- Mouth: Lake Ladoga
  - coordinates: 61°42′34″N 30°59′37″E
- Length: 70 km (43 mi)
- Basin size: 3,900 km^{2} (1,500 sq mi)

Basin features
- Progression: Lake Ladoga→ Neva→ Gulf of Finland

Jänisjoki (Russian: Янисйоки) is a river of Finland and Russia. It begins from the territory of Finland in the region of North Karelia, passes into the Republic of Karelia in Russia and flows there into Lake Ladoga. It is 70 kilometres (43 mi) long, and has a drainage basin of 3,900 square kilometres (1,500 sq mi). It is part of the Neva River basin in Finland and Russia that flows into the Gulf of Finland in St. Petersburg, Russia.

== See also ==
- List of rivers of Finland
