= Lake Segozero =

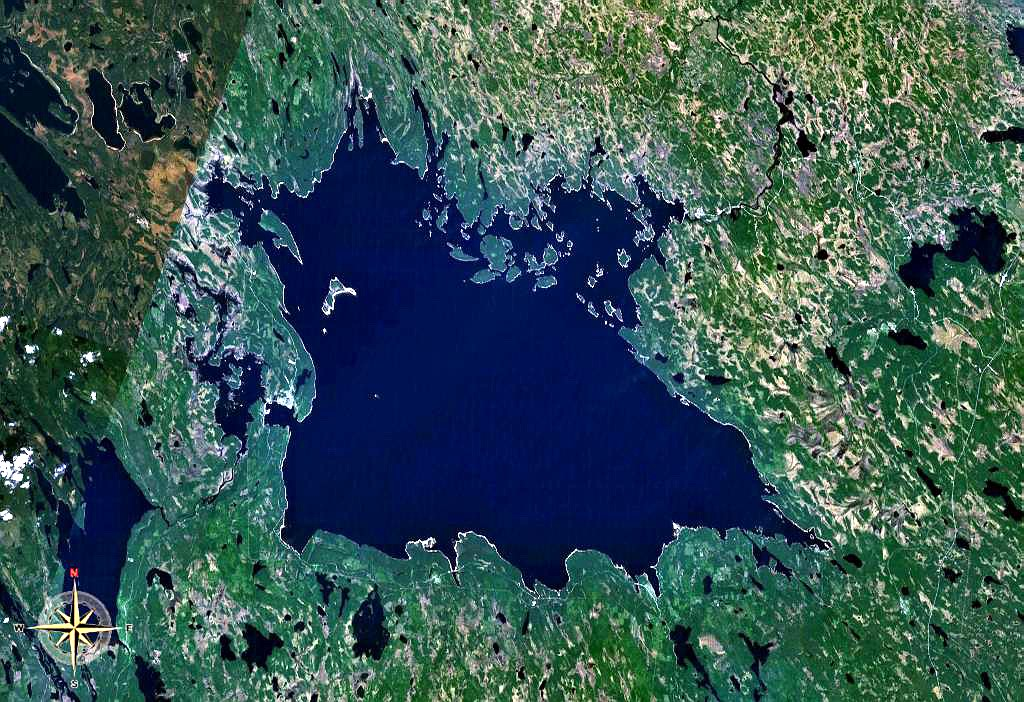
- Seen from space

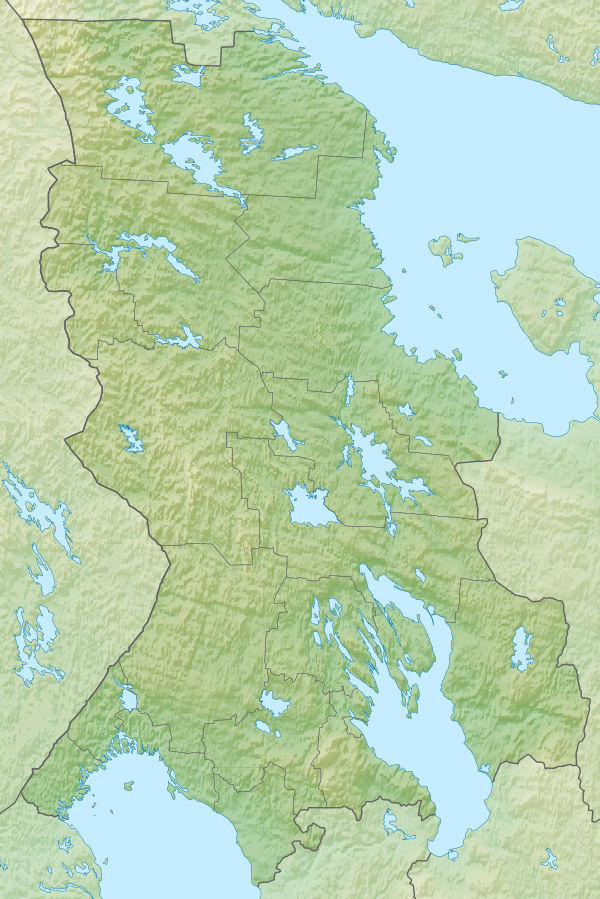
- Location within Karelia Location within Russia
- Location: Republic of Karelia
- Coordinates: 63.3°N 33.75°E
- Type: natural lake, reservoir
- Primary outflows: Segezha
- Basin countries: Russia
- Surface area: 906 km^{2} (350 sq mi)
- Max. depth: 103 m (338 ft)

Lake Segozero (Russian: Сегозеро, Finnish: Seesjärvi) is a large freshwater lake in the Republic of Karelia, northwestern part of Russia. It is located at 63.3°N 33.75°E. The Segezha is a major outflow from Segozero and it empties to Vygozero. After the hydroelectric power plant was built on Segezha River the surface area of Segozero Lake have risen from 815 km² to 906 km².

The lake was dammed in the 1970s.
