= Einar Mäkinen =

Finnish general (1895–1964)

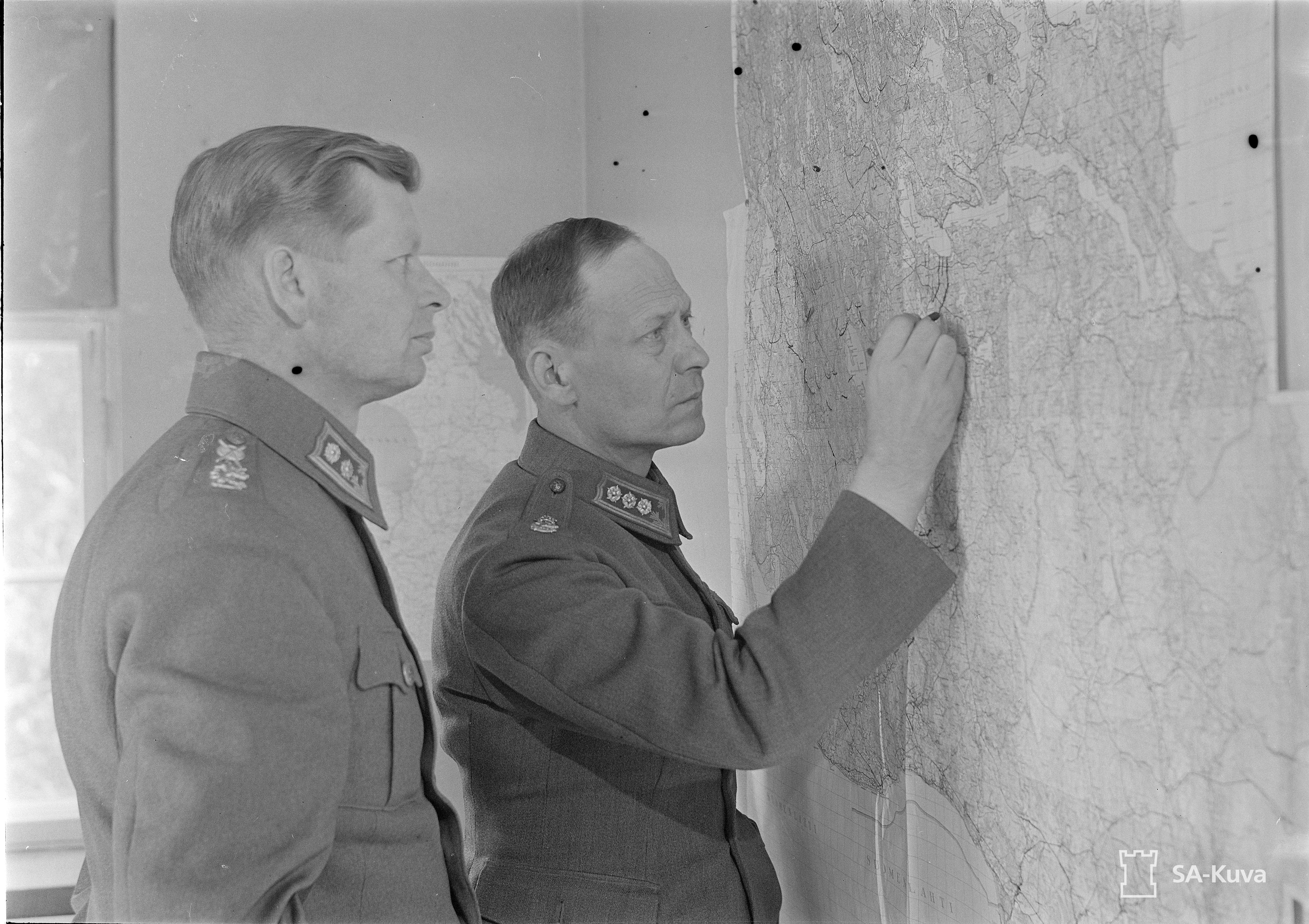
- Mäkinen (right) inspecting a map in 1941
- Born: 3 July 1895; Maaria, Grand Duchy of Finland, Russian Empire
- Died: 8 September 1964 (aged 69) Helsinki, Finland
- Buried: Hietaniemi Cemetery
- Allegiance: German Empire (1916–1918); Finland (1918–1947)
- Branch: Imperial German Army; Finnish Jäger troops; Finnish Army
- Service years: 1916–1946
- Rank: Lieutenant General (1945)
- Commands: I Corps (1941–1941); V Corps (1942–1943); II Corps (1944)
- Conflicts: World War I; Eastern Front; Finnish Civil War; Battle of Tampere; Battle of Vilppula; Battle of Ruovesi; World War II; Winter War; Continuation War; Invasion of Ladoga Karelia; Invasion of the Karelian Isthmus; Vyborg–Petrozavodsk offensive; Battle of Ilomantsi
- Awards: Order of the Cross of Liberty; Order of the White Rose; Order of the Sword; Iron Cross
- Other work: CEO of Parava Oy

Einar Nikolai Mäkinen (3 July 1895 – 8 September 1964) was a Finnish lieutenant general (Finnish: kenraaliluutnantti) and a member of the Jäger movement. He participated in the Eastern Front of World War I, the Finnish Civil War, the Winter War and the Continuation War. Before the Continuation War, he participated in negotiations with the Germans regarding plans for the war.

During the Continuation War, Mäkinen served both as the national labor chief and as a corps commander. During the 1941 Finnish invasion of East Karelia, his I Corps captured the town of Sortavala. Mäkinen returned to corps command, this time of the II Corps, for the 1944 Soviet Vyborg–Petrozavodsk offensive. During the offensive, his corps was attacked by four divisions of the Soviet 32nd Army and fell back to the region south of Ilomantsi. Parts of the corps participated in the routing and partial destruction of two Soviet divisions in the Battle of Ilomantsi. Post-war, he briefly served as the quartermaster general and as the acting chief of the general staff. In 1946, Mäkinen left the military and was charged in the Weapons Cache Case, but the charges against him were dropped in 1948.

== Early life ==
Einar Nikolai Mäkinen was born on 3 July 1895 in Maaria to farmer parents Fredrik Mäkinen and Fredrika Johansson. He graduated as an ylioppilas in 1914 from a lyceum in Turku, and started law studies in the University of Helsinki. He soon became involved in the Finnish Jäger Movement, traveling to Germany in January 1916 to receive military training with other Finnish volunteers. During his time in Germany, Mäkinen fought for the imperial German Army on the Eastern Front of World War I as a member of the 27th Royal Prussian Jäger Battalion, taking part in several battles in the regions of Misa, Gulf of Riga and Lielupe.

Mäkinen returned to Finland on 11 November 1917, taking part in the Finnish Civil War on the side of the Whites first as an instructor and later as the commander of the Kauhava White Guard. Under his command, the unit participated in the capture of Lapua, Seinäjoki, Kokkola, Raahe and Oulu. Mäkinen also took part in the battles of Vilppula and Ruovesi between January and March 1918, as well as in the Battle of Tampere fought between March and April 1918.

== After the Civil War ==
In 1918, Mäkinen was promoted from the private-equivalent rank of jäger directly to a lieutenant of the Finnish Army. He continued his career as an officer, first as a company commander. In 1919 he was promoted to captain and took a teaching position in the Reserve Officer Schools, followed by a taking command of a battalion from 1922 to 1923. In 1923, Mäkinen transferred to a staff role in the office of the Inspector of Infantry and was promoted to a major. In 1926, he became the chief of the training office at the Finnish General Headquarters, and began teaching tactics at the Finnish General Staff College. He was promoted to a lieutenant colonel in 1927 and to a colonel in 1933, taking a position as the executive officer of a corps headquarters.

Mäkinen married Amanda Fredrika Perälä in 1918, but the couple divorced in 1943. The same year, Mäkinen married Impo Dagmar Aalto. During his two marriages, Mäkinen had a total of five children, of whom one died aged eighteen and another aged three.

In 1934, Mäkinen was made the head of the Ministry of Defence office in charge of mobilization affairs. The office initially handled matters related to military materiel, while personnel matters were handled by another mobilization office under the Finnish General HQ. In 1937, the latter of these was merged into Mäkinen's office to form a department in charge of organization, conscription and mobilization, still under the command of Mäkinen. During the Finno-Soviet Winter War of 1939–40, Mäkinen worked in the General HQ Section I (Finnish: Jaosto I), which was in charge of organization and training. In 1941, he took part in negotiations with the Germans regarding plans for a future war with the Soviet Union.

== During the Continuation War ==
At the beginning of the Continuation War, fought by Finland and Nazi Germany against the Soviet Union in 1941–44, Mäkinen was in charge of the Organization Department of the Finnish General HQ. However, soon after the start of the 1941 Finnish invasion of East Karelia, the Finnish high command identified that the command structure on the northwestern shore of Lake Ladoga needed to be clarified. To this end, a new I Corps was created in the region under Mäkinen's command, taking command of the Finnish forces engaged in the region. The corps was first tasked with the containment and destruction of the reinforced Soviet 168th Rifle Division surrounded in the area of Sortavala. The corps captured Sortavala, but failed to prevent parts of the 168th Division from escaping over Lake Ladoga. Following a complete reorganization, which saw all the corps's divisions changed for others, the corps attacked on the Karelian Isthmus towards Leningrad, eventually reaching the area of Lembolovo where it took a defensive stance.

In early 1942, a large reorganization of the Finnish Army was conducted. The Finnish high command saw the area between Lake Ladoga and Lake Onega as too large to be managed by a single corps level headquarters, and as such ordered the creation of a new V Corps in the Svir sector. The command of the corps was given to Mäkinen.

Between the fall of 1943 and June 1944, Mäkinen acted as the national labor chief. In this role, he was in charge of determining how limited labor resources were to be divided between tasks such as agriculture and forestry work, military industry, and the construction of fortifications. During his time in the office, he was most notably responsible for the decision to grant leave to some 10,000 infantrymen for a month to reduce the shortage of agricultural labor during the fall of 1943. Mäkinen got poorly along with the Minister of Public Works Toivo Ikonen, who threatened to resign because of Mäkinen's appointment. The conflict resulted in Ikonen's resignation in January 1944.

In June 1944, the Soviet Vyborg–Petrozavodsk offensive began, and Mäkinen was given command of the II Corps. The corps, located in Eastern Karelia, consisted of only a single division and one brigade when it was attacked by four divisions of the Soviet 32nd Army. It conducted a fighting retreat to the Suoyarvi–Porosozero area, from where it was pushed further back to the region south of Ilomantsi. During this time, the corps grew to consist of the 1st and 7th Divisions, four brigades and Group E. The last of these was an ad-hoc formation consisting of two brigades, a border guards battalion and parts of the 14th Division. Parts of the corps participated in the routing and partial destruction of the 176th and 289th Rifle Divisions of the Soviet 32nd Army through encirclement in the Battle of Ilomantsi.

== Post-war career ==
After the war, Mäkinen served as quartermaster general from 1944 to 1946. He was promoted to lieutenant general (Finnish: kenraaliluutnantti) in 1945, and was the acting chief of the general staff from 1945 to 1946. In early 1945, he was considered for Minister of Defence by the post-war President of Finland Carl Gustaf Emil Mannerheim, but this was blocked by the political left due to his 1941 cooperation with the Germans. He left the military in 1946, becoming the chief executive officer of Parava Oy, a Finnish limited company.

Later that year, Mäkinen was detained in relation to the Weapons Cache Case, where large amounts of Finnish military materiel, for up to 34 battalions, had been cached in secret and without official sanction in fear of a possible Soviet occupation, in breach of the Moscow Armistice. Mäkinen was suspected of having planned the hiding of armaments and an unsanctioned mobilization and spent a year in prison. However, the charges against him were dropped in 1948.

Following the death of Mannerheim in 1951, Mäkinen was one of the nine generals who acted as pallbearers at his state funeral. Mäkinen himself died in Helsinki on 8 September 1964. He is buried in the military section of the Hietaniemi Cemetery in Helsinki.

== Notable Awards ==
During his career, Mäkinen was granted several military awards. The most notable of these are the Finnish Cross of Liberty, 1st Class with a grand star and Commander of the Order of the White Rose, the Swedish Order of the Sword and the German Iron Cross.
