= Finnish invasion of Ladoga Karelia =

Finnish offensive during the Continuation War

- Part of the Continuation War and Eastern Front
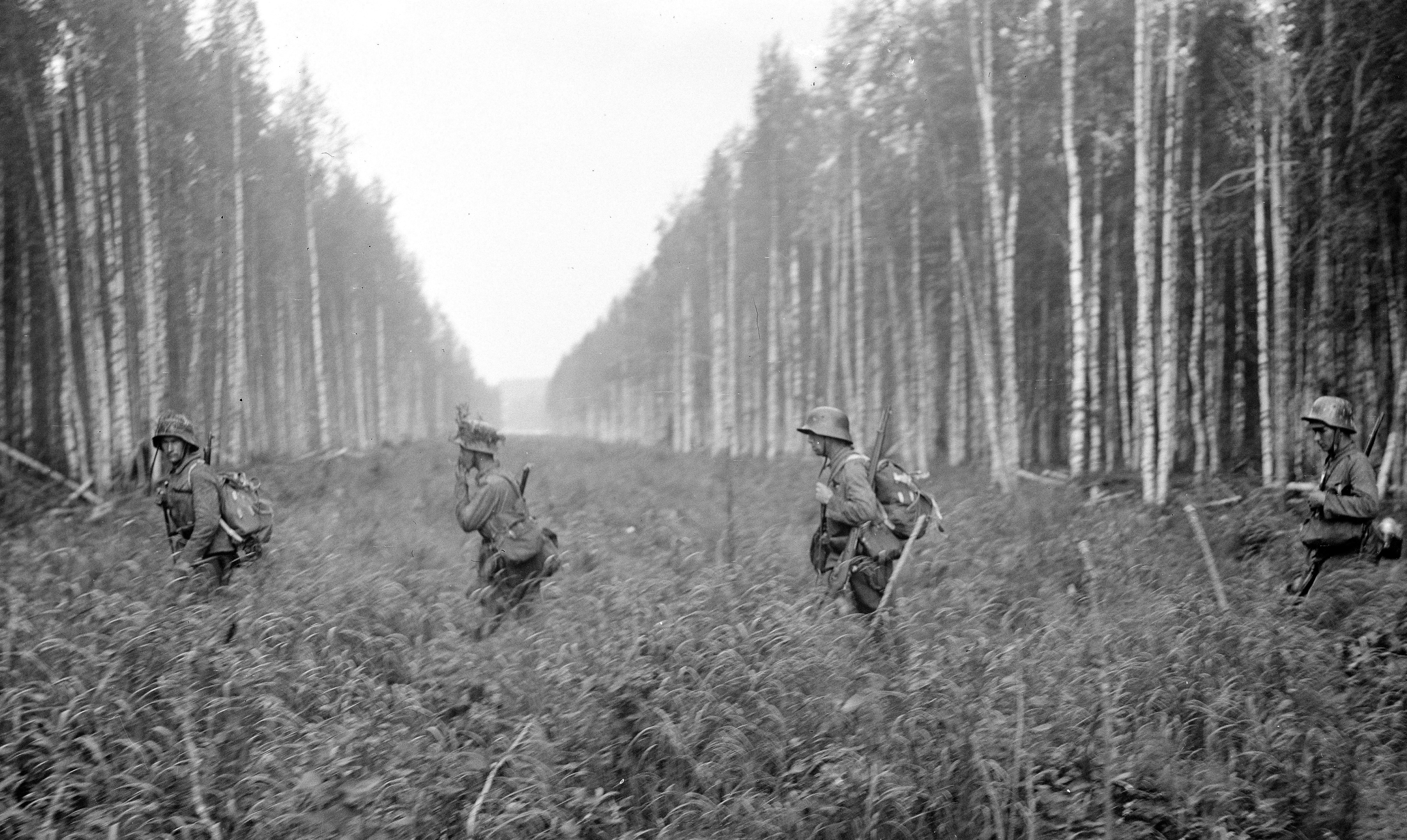
- Finnish soldiers crossing the 1940-agreed border into the Soviet Union during the invasion
Date	July – August 1941
Location	Ladoga Karelia, Soviet Union
Result	Finnish victory

Belligerents
Finland; Germany	Soviet Union

Commanders and leaders
Erik Heinrichs; Paavo Talvela	Filipp Gorelenko

Units involved
Army of Karelia	7th Army

The Finnish invasion of Ladoga Karelia was a military campaign carried out by Finland in 1941. It was part of what is commonly referred to as the Continuation War. Early in the war, Finnish forces captured the Ladoga Karelia. It had been ceded to the Soviet Union on 13 March 1940, in the Moscow Peace Treaty, which marked the end of the Winter War. Later, in the summer of 1944, the Soviet Union recaptured the eastern part of Ladoga Karelia in the Vyborg–Petrozavodsk Offensive.

== Initial layout of forces ==
At the start of the Continuation War the Finnish army was deployed in a defensive posture, but on June 29 Mannerheim created the Army of Karelia, commanded by Lt. Gen. Erik Heinrichs, and ordered it to prepare to attack Ladoga Karelia. The Army of Karelia consisted of VI Corps (the 5th and 11th Divisions), VII Corps (the 7th and 19th divisions) and Group Oinonen (also known as Group O, the Cavalry Brigade, and the 1st Jaeger Brigade and 2nd Jaeger Brigade). The Finnish 1st Division was kept in reserve. The Finns planned to separate the defending Soviet forces by reaching the shore of Lake Ladoga and then to advance along the shores of the lake.

Opposing them were the Soviet 7th Army with the 168th Rifle Division near Sortavala and the 71st Rifle Division north of Jänisjärvi ("Hare Lake"). The Soviets had prepared field fortifications along the border across Sortavala and at the important road crossings at Värtsilä and Korpiselkä.

== Beginning of the offensive ==
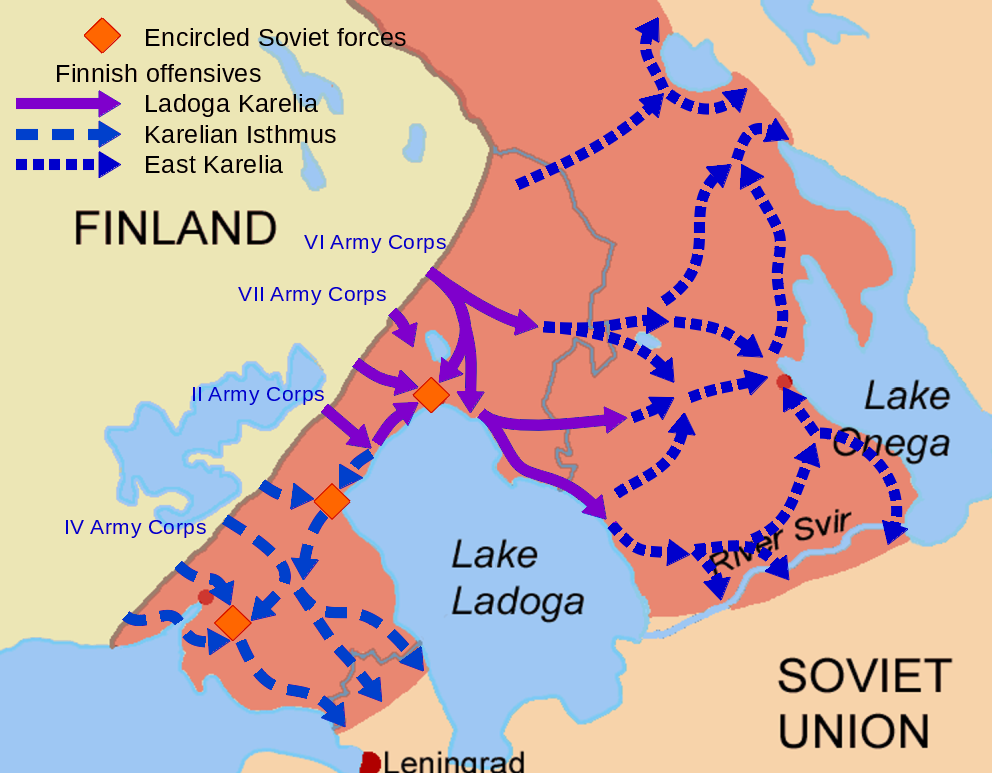
Map depicting the Finnish offensive operations in Karelia carried out in the Summer and Autumn of 1941 during Operation Barbarossa. The furthest advance of Finnish units and borders for both before and after the Winter War are shown.

On July 9, the order for the offensive was given. The main task to break through the Soviet defences between Värtsilä and Korpiselkä was given to VI Corps, commanded by Maj. Gen. Paavo Talvela. The Finnish offensive quickly overwhelmed the Soviet defenders. The Finnish 1st Jaeger Brigade (Col. Ruben Lagus) was brought from Group O to spearhead the assault and it managed to create a gap in the Soviet defences through which Finnish light infantry, some mounted on bicycles, pushed forward.

The right flank of the Finnish offensive consisting of the Finnish 11th Division of the VI Corps met strong Soviet resistance on the eastern shore of the Jänisjärvi Lake, and clearing the resistance lasted until July 16. After clearing the resistance the 11th Division advanced and rounded the southern end of the Jänisjärvi Lake and set up positions facing west along the Jänisjoki River. Simultaneously, the Finnish VII Corps had been attacking southwards on the west side of Jänisjärvi Lake; however, strong Soviet defensive effort turned the offensive into a crawl. It took until July 15 for the Finnish forces to reach the main Soviet defenses. It took until July 17 for the Finnish VII Corps to finally reach the Jänisjoki River, and clearing the surrounded Soviet forces lasted until July 21. Since the Finnish advance had extended the frontlines, some of the Finnish forces were starting to redeploy on July 16, with the Finnish 1st Division being ordered to cover the eastern flank of the advance, while the Finnish 17th Division, which had left guarding of the Soviet base at Hanko to local troops, was brought to the area as well. The two-regiment-strong German 163rd Infantry Division was ordered to capture the town and railroad junction of Suvilahti. These acts had effectively increased the Finnish strength in the area by three divisions.

The Finnish advance on the left flank of the VI Corps by the two-brigade-strong Group Oinonen stalled almost as soon as it had started. Its advance tied down some Soviet troops, but Talvela who commanded the Finnish VI Corps assessed that Group Oinonen's mission had been a resounding failure. However, he also criticized his superior's orders to use these lighter troops against known strong Soviet positions.

The main Finnish advance continued southwards towards the town of Loimola (ru), through which ran the railroad between Sortavala and Petrozavodsk. Loimola was captured by the Finnish forces by July 15. General Talvela pressed his forces further and the 1st Jaegar Brigade finished its 110 km long contested advance when it reached the shore of Lake Ladoga at Koirinoja (ru) the next day. This also severed the connections between the Soviet forces in the area. While Talvela continued his advance both further east along the shore of the Lake Ladoga as well as further inland the Soviets had reorganized some of their forces and were rushing reinforcements to the east shore of Lake Ladoga. The Soviet 452nd Motorized Infantry Regiment set up defensive positions around the town of Salmi; however advancing Finnish forces encircled the defenders and captured Salmi by 21 July. After the VI Corps reached the 1939 border on July 23 Mannerheim ordered a halt the next day to advances further east and set the forces to preparing defensive positions along the Tuulema River. Crossing of the 1939 border did not sit well with all of the Finns and over 2,000 men initially refused to cross the old border.

== Continued fighting in Ladoga Karelia ==
The Finnish 7th Division of the VII Corps launched its attack towards the town of Sortavala from the east and managed to capture the village of Ruskeala on July 25 allowing the Finns to present a unified front against the Soviets defending Sortavala. The Soviets had in turn reinforced their defending 168th Rifle Division in the area with the Soviet 198th Motorized Division and prepared to launch a counterattack towards Jänisjoki River however the Finns managed to capture the plans of the Soviet counterattack. With access to the Soviet plans and having fresh troops readied against the Soviet advance, the counterattack failed and by August 1 the Soviet 198th Motorized Division was already in full retreat. The Finnish decision to order the Finnish II Army Corps to advance trapped the Soviet forces.

By August 7 the Finnish 2nd Division of the II Corps had already reached the shore of Lake Ladoga at Lahdenpohja and cut off the Soviet divisions north-west of Lake Ladoga from their intended withdrawal routes. Near Sortavala the attacking Finnish forces of the 2nd, 7th and 19th divisions were reorganized into the I Army Corps and the town fell to the Finnish forces on August 15. The defending Soviet forces of the 168th Rifle Division withdrew along the coast but were encircled. The Soviets managed to evacuate most of their manpower on barges over Lake Ladoga. The Finns captured large amounts of war material that the Soviets had not been able to evacuate.

== See also ==
- Finnish invasion of the Karelian Isthmus
- Military history of Finland
