= Army of Karelia =

Military unit of Finland

The Army of Karelia (Finnish: Karjalan armeija; Swedish: Karelska armén) was a Finnish army during the Continuation War.

The Army of Karelia was formed on 29 June 1941 soon after the start of the Continuation War.

== Organisation ==
The army was organised in two corps and one separate group.

- VII Corps (VII armeijakunta)
- VI Corps (VI armeijakunta)
- Group Oinonen or Group O (Ryhmä Oinonen or Ryhmä O)

The corps consisted of a total of 5 infantry divisions. The Cavalry Brigade and the 1st and 2nd Jäger Brigades were organised into Group O. Also, the German 163rd Infantry Division was later added to the army.

== Offensive ==
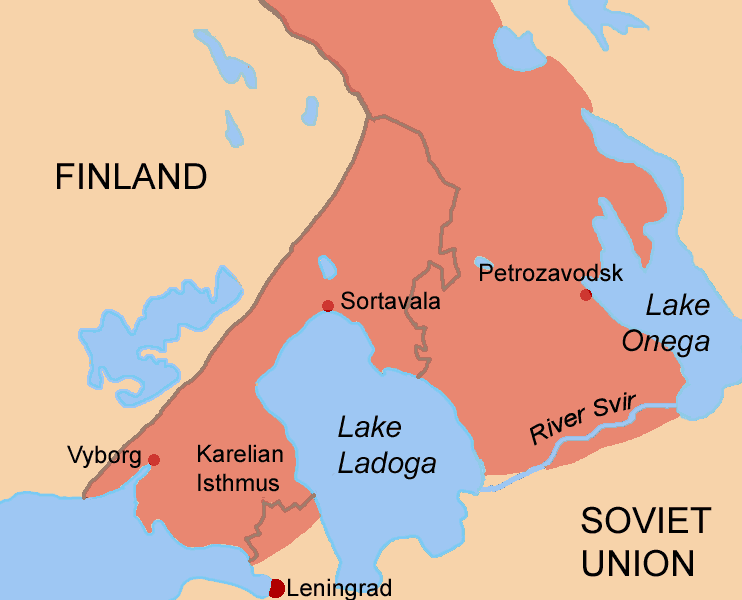
The areas occupied by Finnish troops during the Continuation War. The Karelian Army fought north of Lake Ladoga.

On July 10 the Army started its offensive against East Karelia, north of Lake Ladoga. The aim was to reclaim the areas lost to the Soviet Union in the Winter War, but also to advance deeper into Soviet territory to gain a more easily defensible front.

On the north flank the army was supported by the independent 14th Division and to the south by forces on the Karelian Isthmus.

The army's advance was rapid due to the use of light jäger troops. The capital of Karelia Petrozavodsk was taken in October and promptly renamed to the poetic Äänislinna. By September 1941, the Army of Karelia participated in the Siege of Leningrad, threatening the city from the east. During the autumn of 1941 the army took positions along the river Svir between lakes Ladoga and Onega. Medvezhegorsk was taken in December.

After the offensive phase of the war ended, the Army of Karelia was disbanded and its HQ became HQ of Aunus Group.

== Commanders ==
- General of Infantry Erik Heinrichs 29 June 1941 – 29 January 1942
- Lieutenant General Karl Lennart Oesch (temporary) 29 January 1942 – 1 March 1942

== See also ==
- Continuation War
- List of Finnish armies in World War II
- Karelia
