= Battle of Tali–Ihantala =

1944 battle of the Continuation War

- Part of the Continuation War of World War II
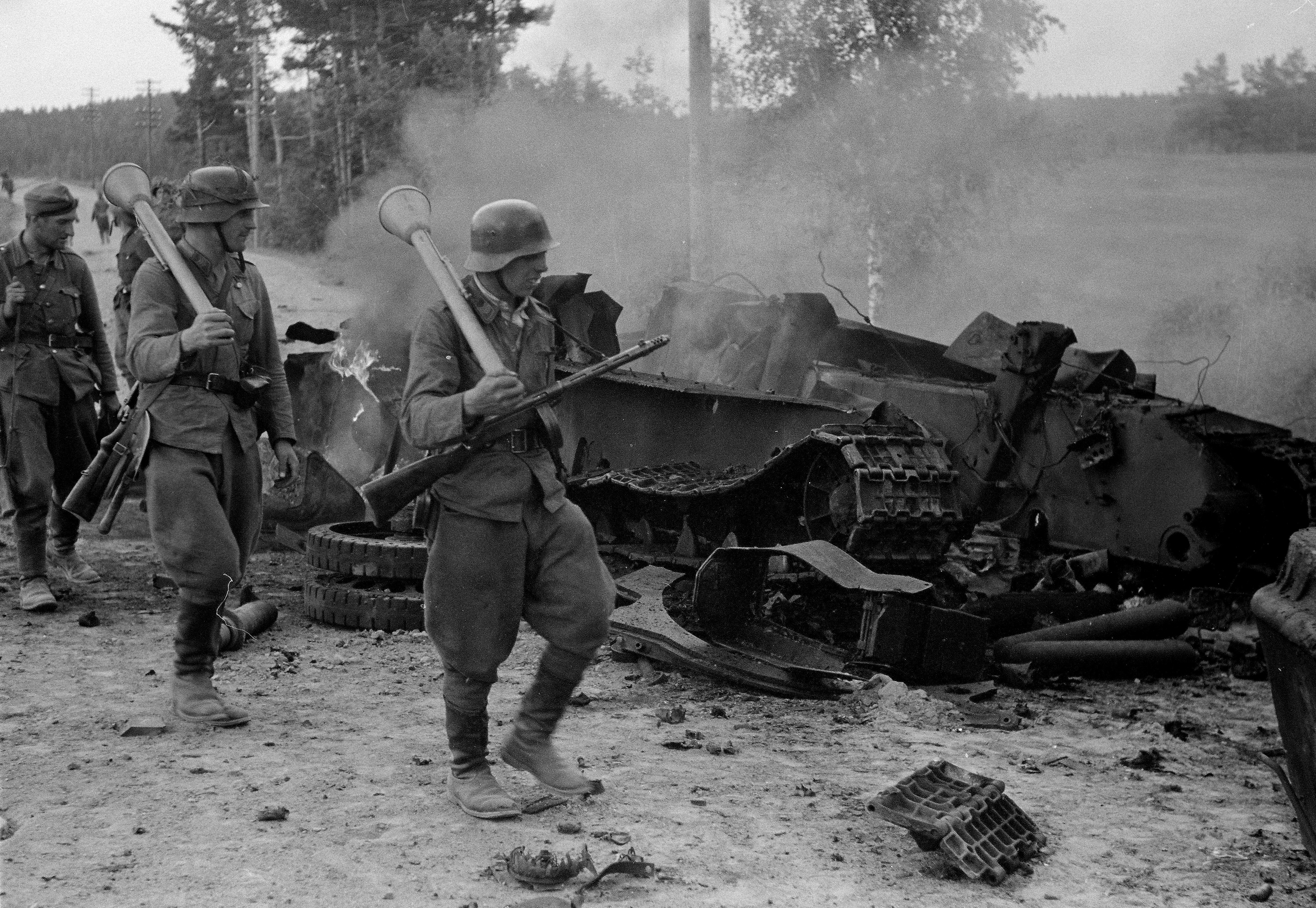
- Finnish soldiers marching next to a destroyed Soviet T-34 tank
| Date | June 25 to July 9, 1944 |
| Location | 60°46′N 28°53′E; Karelian Isthmus |
| Result | Finnish victory |

Belligerents
| Finland; Germany | Soviet Union |

Commanders and leaders
| (Finland) C.G.E. Mannerheim (Finland) Karl Lennart Oesch (Nazi Germany) Kurt Kuhlmey | (Soviet Union) Leonid Govorov (Soviet Union) Dmitry Gusev (Soviet Union) Aleksandr Cherepanov |

Strength
| (Finland) 50,000 (later near 100,000) (Nazi Germany) 4,000 | 150,000; Soviet sources: 48,000–60,000 |

Casualties and losses
| (Finland) Finnish: c. 8,750 total: 1,350 killed; 1,100 missing; 6,300 wounded; 3 tanks destroyed; 12 aircraft; (Nazi Germany) German: 33 aircraft | Finnish estimate: 600 tanks 284–320 aircraft Later Finnish estimate: 21st Army: estimated 4,500–5,500 killed 8,561 killed or wounded 23rd Army: 1,458 killed, 288 missing, 6,159 wounded 27,500 total casualties |

The Battle of Tali–Ihantala (June 25 to July 9, 1944) was part of the Finnish-Soviet Continuation War (1941–1944), which occurred during World War II. The battle was fought between Finnish forces—using war materiel provided by Germany—and Soviet forces. To date, it is the largest battle in the history of the Nordic countries.

The battle marked a point in the Soviet offensive when the Finnish forces first prevented the Soviets from making any significant gains. Earlier at Siiranmäki and Perkjärvi the Finns had halted advancing Soviet forces. The Finnish forces achieved a defensive victory against overwhelming odds.

After the Soviets had failed to create any breakthroughs at Tali–Ihantala, Vyborg Bay, or Vuosalmi, the Soviet Leningrad Front started the previously planned transfer of troops from the Karelian Isthmus to support the Narva offensive, where they were encountering particularly fierce resistance. Though the Leningrad Front failed to advance into Finland as ordered by the Stavka, some historians state that the offensive did eventually force Finland from the war.

== Background ==
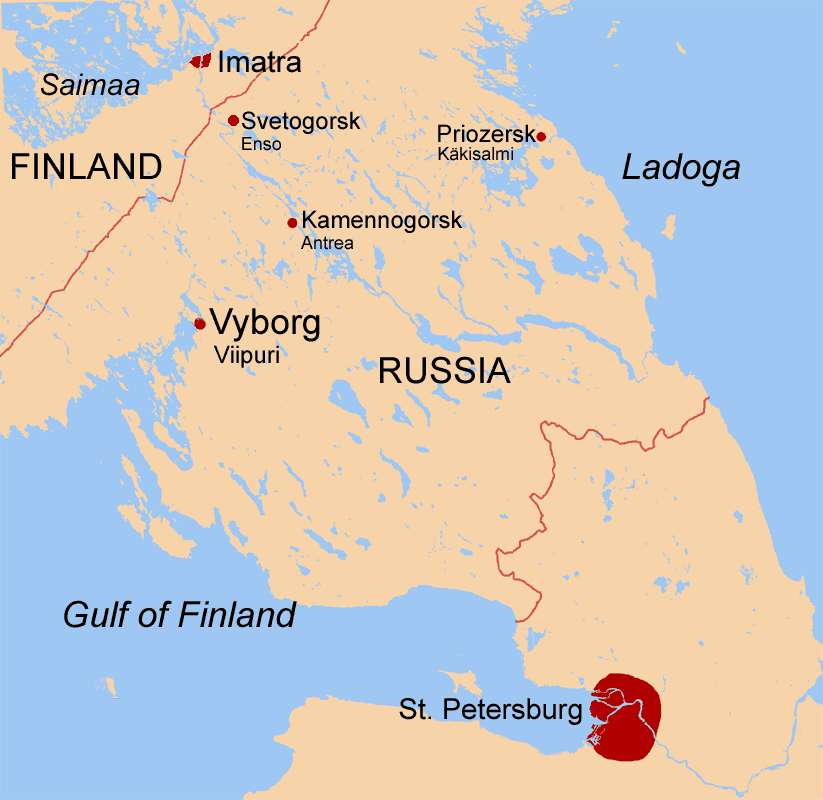
Map of the Karelian Isthmus. The River Vuoksi can be seen originating from near the city Imatra.

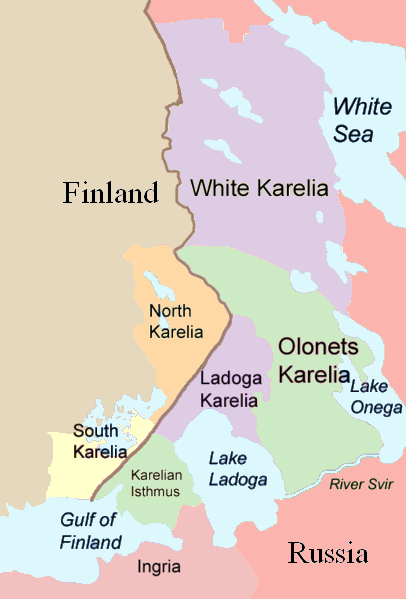
Parts of Karelia, as they are traditionally divided.

After the initial Finnish advance of 1941, the Continuation War was stabilized to trench warfare with very little activity on either side. When the Siege of Leningrad was lifted in January 1944, the Stavka received orders to plan an offensive against Finland to push it out of the war.

The Soviet attack on the Finnish front commenced on the Karelian Isthmus on June 9, 1944, (coordinated with the Allied Invasion of Normandy). Three Soviet armies were pitted there against the Finns, among them several experienced Guard formations.

The attack soon breached the Finnish front line of defence in Valkeasaari on June 10, and the Finnish forces retreated to their secondary defence line, the VT-line (which ran between Vammelsuu and Taipale). The Soviet attack was supported by a massive artillery barrage, air bombardments, and armoured forces.

The VT-line was breached in Sahakylä and Kuuterselkä on June 14; and after a failed counterattack in Kuuterselkä by the Finnish armoured division, the Finnish defence had to be pulled back to the VKT-line (Viipuri – Kuparsaari – Taipale).

The abandonment of the VT-line was followed by a week of retreat and delaying battles. The Soviet offensive was crowned when the city of Viipuri (Russian: Vyborg) was captured by the Soviets on June 20 after only a short battle. Despite the Red Army's great success in smashing two Finnish defense lines and capturing a substantial piece of territory in just ten days, it had failed to destroy the Finnish army which was able to concentrate its depleted forces on the VKT-line, and had time to get reinforcements from the other main front north of Lake Ladoga.

Baron Mannerheim, Marshal of Finland, Finnish commander in chief, had asked for German help on June 12, and on June 16 the Flight Detachment Kuhlmey (a composite ad hoc wing of about 70 dive bombers and ground attack fighters, with a fighter and an air transport component) arrived in Finland. A few days later the battalion-sized 303 Assault Gun Brigade and the 122nd Division Greif also arrived; but after that the Germans offered only supplies, the most important of which were Panzerfaust anti-tank weapons. During one engagement the Finns destroyed 25 Soviet tanks with the Panzerfaust weapons.

On June 21 the Stavka ordered the Leningrad Front to breach the defensive line and advance to Lake Saimaa.

On June 21 the Finnish government asked the Soviets about the possibility for peace and accompanying Soviet conditions. The Soviet response arrived on June 23; it demanded a signed statement to the effect that Finland was ready to surrender and was asking for peace, but the Finnish government rejected this.

German Foreign Minister Joachim von Ribbentrop arrived on June 22 and demanded a guarantee that Finland would fight to the end as a precondition of continued German military support. President Ryti gave this guarantee as a personal undertaking.

== Order of battle ==
=== Finnish ===
HQ of the Commander of the Isthmus Forces (Lieutenant General Karl Lennart Oesch)

  - IV Corps (Lieutenant General Taavetti Laatikainen)
    - 3rd Division (Major General Aaro Pajari)
    - 4th Division (Major General Pietari Autti)
    - 6th Division (Major General Einar Vihma)
    - 11th Division (from June 27) (Major General Kaarlo Heiskanen)
    - 18th Division (Major General Paavo Paalu sacked June 26, Colonel Otto Snellman)
    - 3rd Brigade "Blue Brigade" (Colonel Lauri Haanterä)
  - Armoured Division (Major General Ruben Lagus)
  - LeR 3 (Lieutenant Colonel E. Magnusson) (33 x Messerschmitt Bf 109, 18 x Brewster Buffalo 239 Fighters and 1 x Fokker C.X reconnaissance)
  - LeR 4 (Colonel O. Sarko) (33 x Bristol Blenheim, 12 x Junkers Ju 88, 8 x Dornier Do 17Z bombers)

On average the strength of the Finnish infantry division was 13,300 men, Armoured Division 9,300 and Brigade 6,700–7000 men. With other troops (at least 4 other battalions), Corps/HQ artillery battalions, AA batteries etc. Finnish ground forces during last days of battle were actually near around 100,000 and not 50,000.

=== German ===
- Luftwaffe Detachment Kuhlmey (Oberstleutnant Kurt Kuhlmey) arrived in Finland on June 16 (x 23–43 Fw 190A-6/F-8 fighters and ground attack aircraft, x 24–30 Junkers Ju 87D Stukas and x 1–8 Bf 109G-8 reconnaissance fighters)
- Sturmgeschütz Brigade 303 (Hauptmann Hans-Wilhelm Cardeneo) arrived in Finland on June 22 (x 22 Sturmgeschütz III Ausf. G assault guns, x 9 StuH 42 assault howitzers)

=== Soviet ===
The Soviet forces that took part in the battle belonged to the Soviet Leningrad Front under Marshal Leonid Govorov's command.

- Soviet 21st Army (Dmitry Gusev) (Tali–Ihantala region) attacked;
  - 30th Guards Rifle Corps,
  - 97th Rifle Corps,
  - 108th Rifle Corps,
  - 109th Rifle Corps,
  - 110th Rifle Corps.

These five corps had together the 45th, 63rd and 64th Guards Rifle Divisions and 46th, 72nd, 90th, 109th, 168th, 178th, 265th, 268th, 286th, 314th, 358th and 372nd Rifle Divisions.

Armoured units of 21st Army and armoured reserves of Leningrad Front in Karelian Isthmus:

- 1st Guards Tank Brigade (described as extremely strong)
- 30th Guards Tank Brigade
- 152nd Tank Brigade
- 220th Tank Brigade
- 26th Guards Breakthrough Tank Regiment
- 27th Guards Heavy Breakthrough Tank Regiment
- 27th Separate Tank Regiment
- 31st Guards Breakthrough Tank Regiment
- 98th Tank Regiment
- 124th Tank Regiment
- 185th Tank Tank Regiment
- 260th Guards Breakthrough Tank Regiment
- 351st Guards Heavy Self-Propelled Gun Regiment
- 394th Heavy Self-Propelled Gun Regiment
- 396th Self-Propelled Gun Regiment
- 397th Self-Propelled Gun Regiment
- 1222nd Self-Propelled Gun Regiment
- 1238th Self-Propelled Gun Regiment
- 1326th Self-Propelled Gun Regiment
- 1439th Self-Propelled Gun Regiment

Strength of armoured brigades around 60 and regiments around 15–21 tanks or assault/ Self-propelled guns.

The 21st Army did not commit all of its forces simultaneously but instead kept some of the forces in reserve and committed them only after the initially committed formations had spent their offensive capability and required rest and refit. Also, at the beginning of the battle, some of the Soviet forces that later took part in the battle were deployed on nearby sections of the front, such as the 108th Rifle Corps with its three divisions being deployed to Vyborg and the Vyborg Bay area. According to Doctor Ohto Manninen some 25% of 21st Army forces did not take part at Battle of Tali–Ihantala.

Artillery of Leningrad Front and 21st Army

- 5th Guards Breakthrough Artillery Division
- 15th Breakthrough Artillery Division
- 51st Artillery Brigade
- 127th Artillery Brigade
- 3rd Guards Mortar Brigade (rocket launchers)
- 19th Guards Mortar Brigade (rocket launchers)

– 7 field artillery regiments (corps)

– 4 mortar regiments (using rocket launchers)

- Soviet 23rd Army (Aleksandr Cherepanov) attacked on the front immediately east of the 21st Army towards Noskua.
  It deployed the Soviet 6th Rifle Corps which consisted of the 13th, 177th, and 382nd Rifle Divisions.

Average Red Army division of Leningrad Front in early June 1944 had 6,500–7,000 men, which is half the size of a Finnish infantry division.

Soviet air power

32nd Anti Aircraft Artillery Division, having 4 AA-regiments.

13th Air Army 9 June 1944 (exact information, according to documents in TsAMO = Russian Defence Ministry Archice in Podolsk): 817 aircraft (including e.g. 235 Il-2s and 205 fighters ). Guards Fighter Aviation Corps, Leningrad: 257 fighters. VVS KBF (Baltic Fleet Air Force) : ~545 aircraft.

Altogether approx 1600 combat aircraft, of which periodically up to 80% were used against the Finnish forces in June 1944 (the rest securing the southern shore of Gulf of Finland against German Luftflotte 1).

== The terrain ==
The Battle of Tali–Ihantala was fought in a small area – 100 square kilometres (39 sq mi) – between the northern tip of Vyborg Bay and the River Vuoksi around the villages of Tali and Ihantala, 8 to 14 kilometres (5.0 to 8.7 mi) northeast of Vyborg.

The Soviet forces were concentrated on the area east of the city of Vyborg, from where the attack started, through the southern village of Tali, northwards to Ihantala (Petrovka). This was the only suitable exit terrain for armoured forces out of the Karelian Isthmus, 10 kilometres (6.2 mi) wide, broken by small lakes and limited by Saimaa Canal on the west and the River Vuoksi on the east.

== Tali: June 25–30 ==
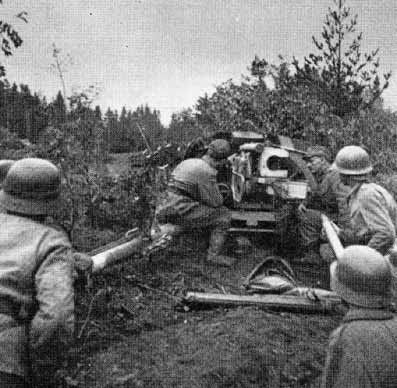
Finnish 7.5 cm Pak 40 antitank gun in action

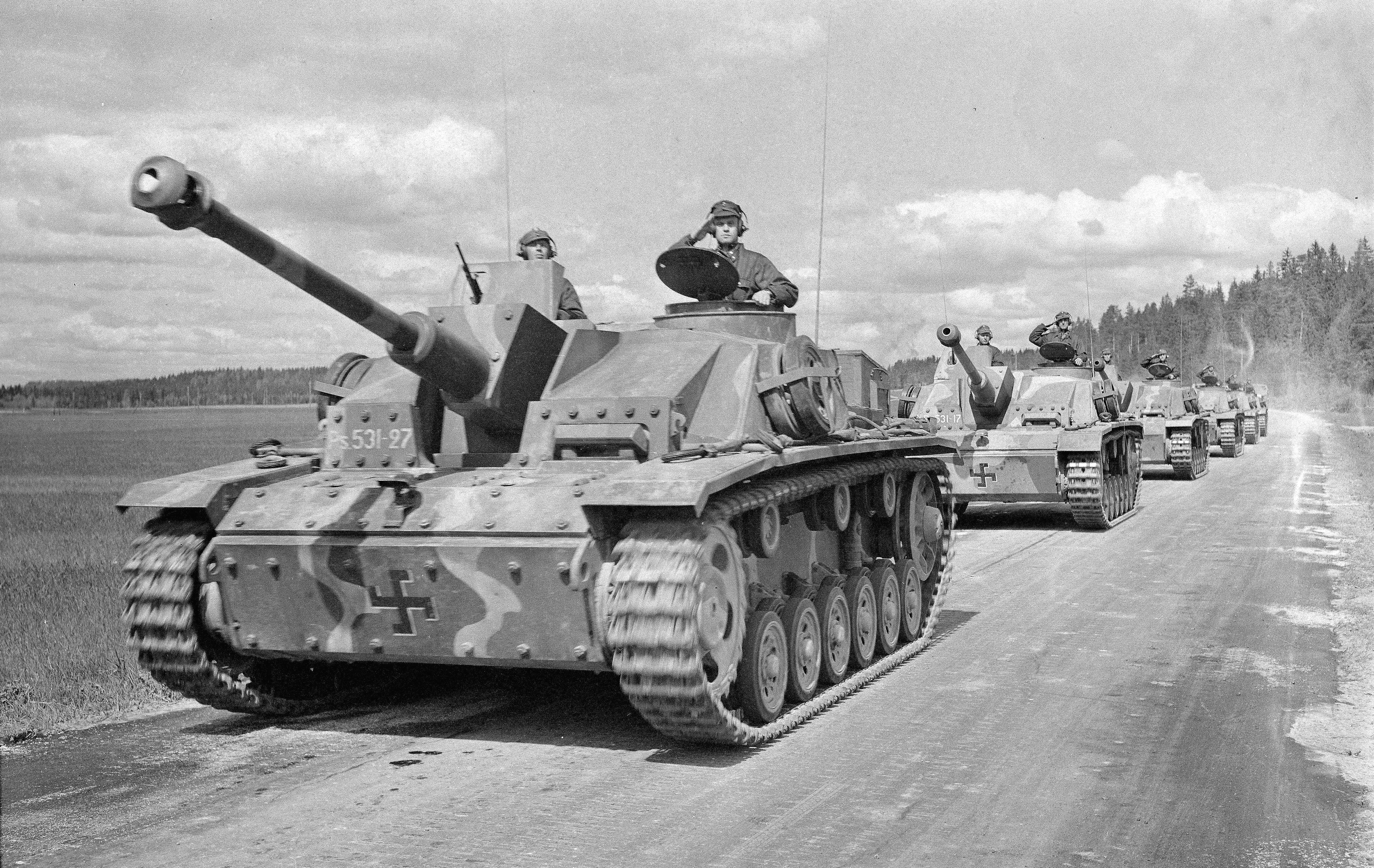
Finnish StuG III Ausf. G assault guns.

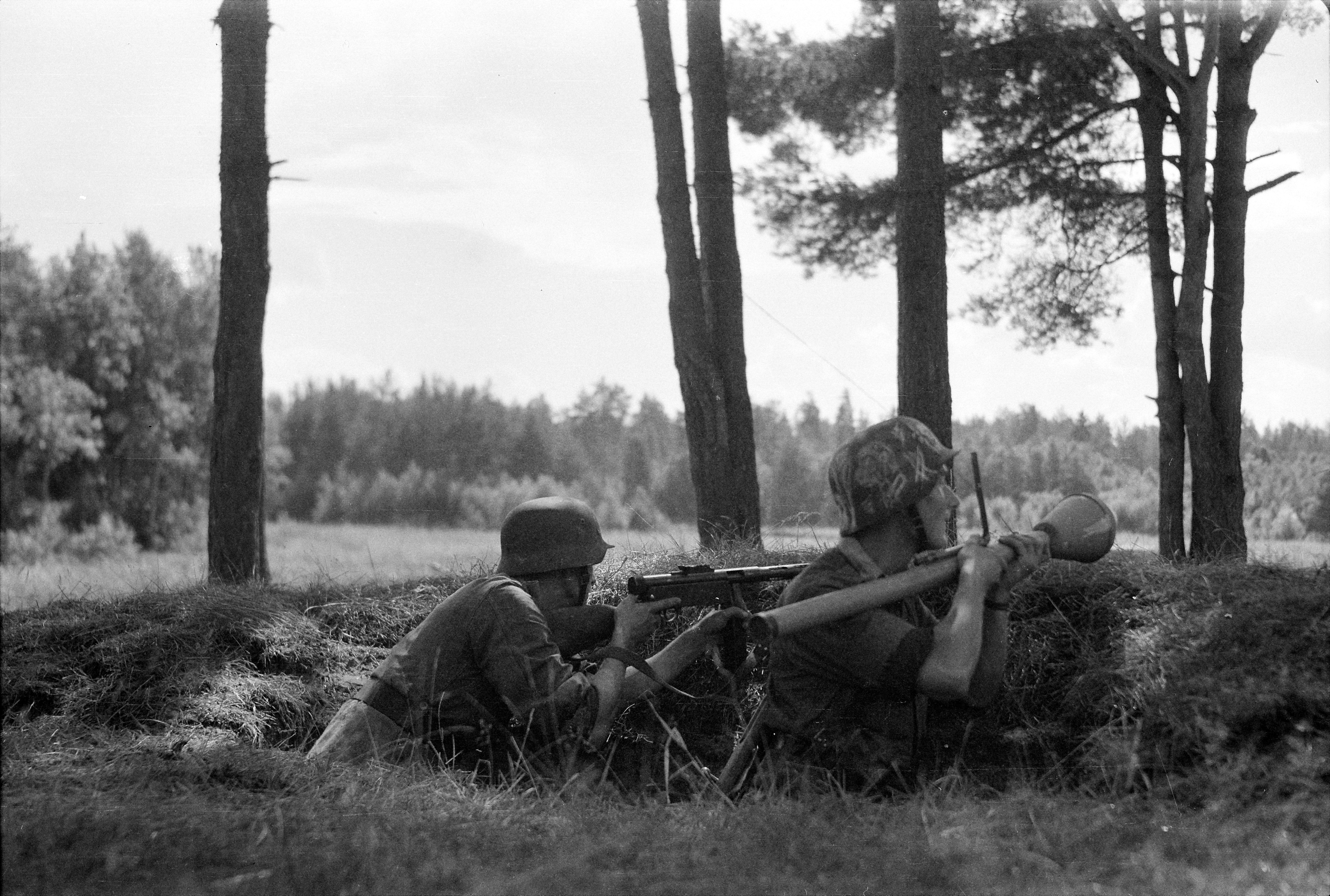
Finnish soldiers in a foxhole. One of the soldiers is holding a Panzerfaust

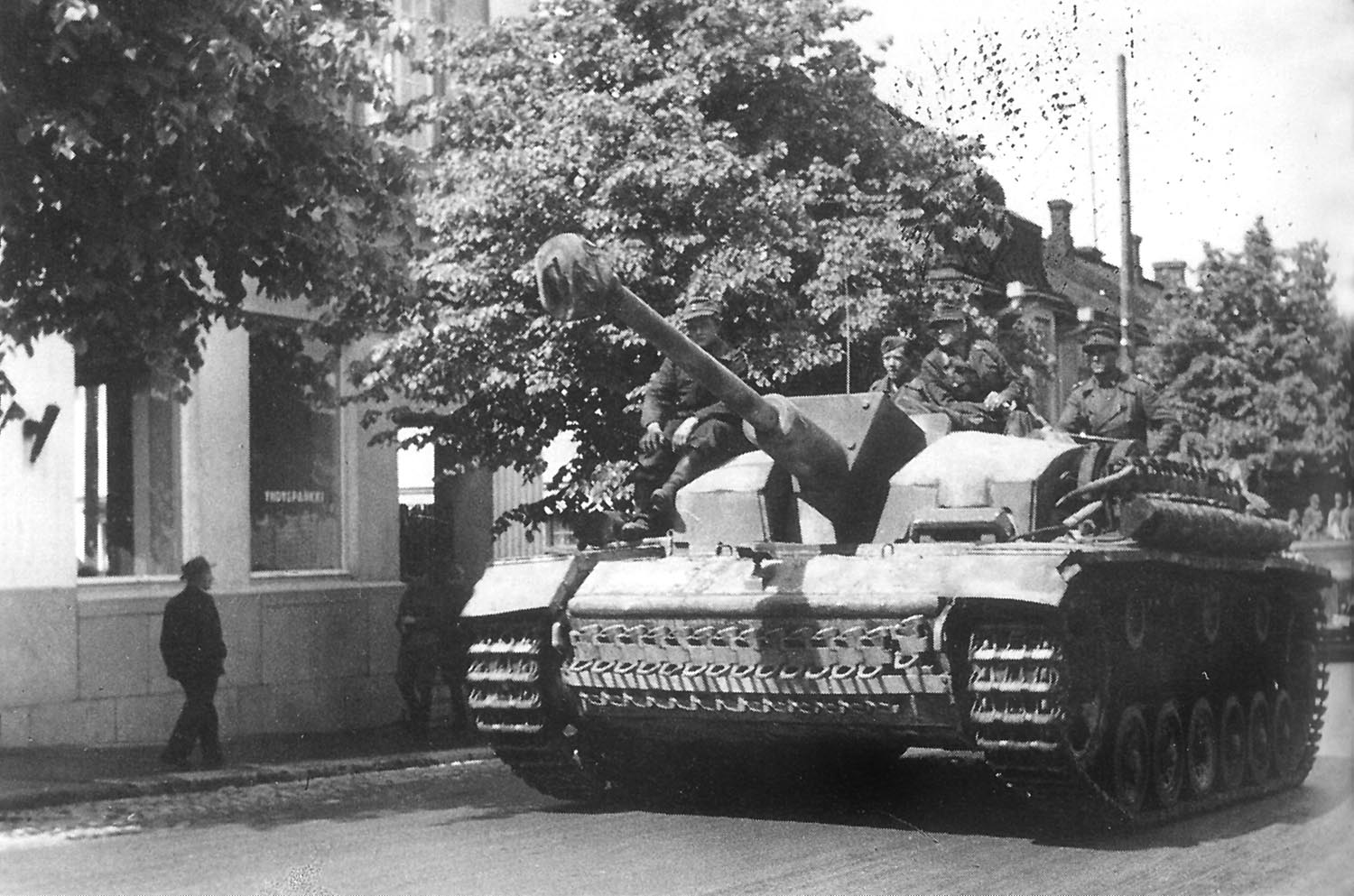
Sturmgeschütz-Brigade 303 on the move in city of Lappeenranta.

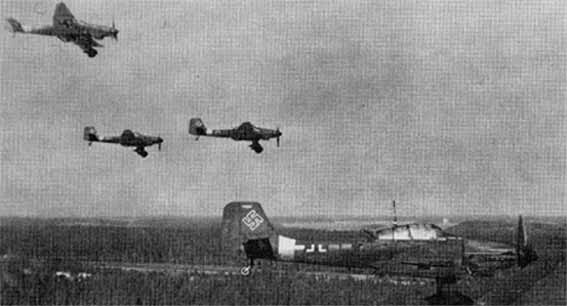
Battle Squadron Kuhlmey's Stukas returning from mission in Karelian Isthmus in late June 1944.

The fighting in the area began on June 20.

=== June 20–24 ===
The first days were a defensive battle that the Finnish 18th Division (6th and 48th Infantry Regiment and 28th Independent Battalion) and 3rd Brigade (4 battalions) and the 3rd battalion of the 13th Regiment (Swedish speaking) fought against the Soviet 97th and 109th Corps and 152nd Tank Brigade. The defenders were hit especially hard by artillery and air attacks, but managed to put up a strong defense that stalled the Soviet advance long enough for Finnish reinforcements to join the battle.

=== June 25–26 ===
The action of June 25 started at 06:30 with a one-hour Soviet heavy artillery bombardment and air attack, followed by a major Soviet offensive from Tali village at 07:30. The Soviets' goal in the attack was to reach Imatra-Lappeenranta-Suurpäälä before June 28. The 30th Guards Rifle Corps had now also joined the battle.

The Soviet army tried to break through along both sides of Lake Leitimojärvi. The attack on the eastern side of the lake was stopped after three kilometers by the Finnish 4th Division. On the west side, the Soviet infantry of the 45th Guards Division and the 109th Corps got stuck in defensive positions around the hills of Konkkalanvuoret defended by the Finnish regiment JR48. However, the Soviet 27th Tank Regiment was able to force their way to the Portinhoikka crossroads.

The Soviets also attacked with the 178th Division over the Saarela Strait, which was defended by Finnish regiment JR6's 1st battalion, but the attack was thrown back here as well. Meanwhile, the Soviet 97th Corps attacked the Finnish 3rd Brigade's positions but gained little ground. At this stage the situation was very critical for the Finns, whose units were at risk of being cut off and surrounded. This would inevitably have led to the defeat of the Finnish IV Corps and the loss of the VKT line.

The Finns were able to organize a counterattack with the reserves of the 18th Division, parts of the 17th Division, and some battle groups from the 4th Division. Later that afternoon, the Finnish armored division joined the battle and managed to push the Soviet attackers on the west side of the Lake Leitimojärvi back to their starting point. The Soviet 27th Tank Regiment was annihilated except for six tanks that were captured by the Finns.

=== June 27–30 ===
More Finnish units joined the battle along with the German 303rd Sturmgeschütz brigade. The Finnish units had been spread out and mixed in the battle, which made the organization of a concentrated defence difficult. The Finnish units were therefore reorganized into two battle groups, BG Björkman and BG Puroma. The Soviets also reinforced their forces with the 108th Corps. At this stage, the Soviet forces included at least one armored brigade, two armored breakthrough regiments, and four assault gun regiments (around 180 AFVs if full strength).

The Finns tried to regain the initiative by attacking the four Soviet divisions (46th Guard, 63rd Guard, 64th Guard, 268th Division and the 30th Guards Tank Brigade) – that had broken through east of Leitimojärvi – from three directions, in order to make a "motti" of the Soviet divisions. The two battle groups, Björkman and Puroma, did manage to advance to within one kilometer of each other but failed to surround the Soviet divisions who had set themselves up into a hedgehog defense around Talinmylly.

The Finnish attack failed because of heavy Soviet resistance especially with massed tanks and artillery, and because communication between several Finnish battalions broke down during the attack. Colonel Puroma said after the war that the one thing he regretted was the failure to make a motti out of Talinmylly. The attack gave the Finnish defenders 72 hours of respite at the same time as the fresh Finnish 6th and 11th Divisions reached the battlefield. Several tank battles took place during this fighting.

On June 28, air activity was high on both sides as Finnish bombers and German Stukas pounded the Soviet formations and the Soviet 276th Bomber Division hit the Finnish troops hard. On June 28, the Finnish commander Oesch gave the order for Finnish units to withdraw back to the line of Vakkila–Ihantalajärvi–Kokkoselkä–Noskuanselkä (still within the VKT line), but they became caught up in a new Soviet offensive. In sector of 18th Division, in Ihantala one powerful barrage by 14 Finnish artillery battalions (~170 guns and howitzers) destroyed or damaged at least 15 Soviet tanks.

June 29 was the hardest and worst day for the Finns during the whole battle, and defeat was not far off. The Finnish forces finally managed to restore the line on June 29 after very bloody fighting. On June 30, the Finnish forces retreated from Tali. The heaviest fighting took place between July 1 and July 2 when the Finns lost some 800 men per day.

== Ihantala: July 1–9 ==
The ensuing Finnish concentration of artillery fire was the heaviest in the country's military history. It was based on the famed fire correction method of Finnish Artillery General Vilho Petter Nenonen, which enabled easy fire correction and quick changes of targets. At the critical Ihantala sector of the battle, the Finnish defenders managed to concentrate their fire to the extent of smashing the advancing Soviet spearhead. The clever fire control system enabled as many as 21 batteries, totaling some 250 guns, to fire at the same target simultaneously in the battle; the fire controller did not need to be aware of the location of individual batteries to guide their fire, which made quick fire concentration and target switching possible. The Finnish artillery fired altogether over 122,000 rounds of ordnance. This concentration was considered a world record at the time (In fact with 8 days period Finns fired more rounds in Vuosalmi and if taking 5 days period record of artillery rounds was fired in U-line, Nietjärvi). These fire missions managed to halt and destroy Soviet forces that were assembling at their staging areas. On thirty occasions the Soviet forces destroyed were larger than battalion size.

According to Bitva za Leningrad 1941–1944 ("The Battle of Leningrad") edited by Lieutenant General S.P. Platonov:

"The repeated offensive attempts by the Soviet Forces failed ... to gain results. The enemy succeeded in significantly tightening its ranks in this area and repuls[ing] all attacks of our troops ... During the offensive operations lasting over three weeks, from June 21 to mid-July, the forces of the right flank of the Leningrad front failed to carry out the tasks assigned to them on the orders of the Supreme Command issued on June 21."

By this time the Finnish army had concentrated half its artillery in the area, along with the army's only armoured division, with StuG III assault guns as its primary weapon, and the German 303 Sturmgeschütz Brigade (it destroyed only one Soviet AFV). The defenders now finally had the new German anti-tank weapons that were previously kept in storage. The Finnish also made good use of German Panzerschreck anti-tank weapons. With these weapons the Finnish destroyed a large number of Soviet tanks-including 25 in one afternoon engagement. During 1 July near the village of Tähtelä field artillery of 6th Divisions damaged 4 tanks and during the next day, 2 July, artillery of 6th Division destroyed 5 tanks in Vakkila, Tähtelä and Ihantala.

On July 2 the Finns intercepted a radio message that the 63rd Guards Rifle Division and 30th Armored Brigade were about to launch an attack on July 3 at 04:00 hours. The following morning, two minutes before the supposed attack, 40 Finnish and 40 German bombers bombed the Soviet troops, and 250 guns fired a total of 4,000 artillery shells into the area of the Soviets. On the same day, beginning at 06:00, 200 Soviet planes and their infantry attacked the Finnish troops. By 19:00 the Finnish troops had restored their lines.

On July 6 the Soviet forces had some success, despite the Finnish 6th Division having 18 artillery battalions and one heavy battery for their defence. However, the Soviets were thrown back the following day, and their counterattacks at 13:30 and 19:00 that day did not amount to anything. By July 7, the focus of the Soviet attacks was already moving to the area of Vuoksi, and the Soviets now began transferring (remnants of) their best troops to the Narva front in Estonia, to fight the Germans and the Estonians. From July 9, the Soviet troops no longer attempted a break-through. Nevertheless, some fighting continued.

During period from 21 June to 7 July Soviets forces were able to fire 144,000 artillery and 92,000 mortar rounds, surprisingly near the numbers of Finnish artillery. This suggests that Soviet forces have had some logistics issues. Soviet field artillery of rifle divisions was also relatively light when 70–75% of guns were 76 mm while only 30% of Finnish field artillery was light. According to Soviet statistics the average fired field artillery shell in 1944 was just 12.5 kilos. In Tali–Ihantala, just like in Vuosalmi and U-line Finns concentrated one minute barrages where average weight of shells were 20–24 kilos.

During period from 20 June to 7 July Finnish artillery ammo expenditure in sector of 18th Division, 6th Division and 3rd Brigade was total 113,500 rounds, in sector of 4th Division 24,600 and in sector of 3rd Division 25,150 rounds. Total 163,250 rounds of Finnish field artillery.

Soviet forces were ordered to cease offensive operations and take up defensive positions on July 10 as the Stavka redeployed forces to the Baltic fronts, where the Red Army was encountering "fierce German and Baltic resistance."

== Losses ==
Finnish sources estimate that the Soviet Army lost about 600 tanks in the Battle of Tali–Ihantala, mainly to air attacks, artillery, and close defence weapons. Between 284 and 320 Soviet aircraft were shot down. (Note: Writes exactly “Finnish and German Air Forces destroyed together 569 enemy air planes during the summer 1944 battles in Karelian Isthmus. Of these more than half were shot down during the Tali–Ihantala battle.” From that we can assume that the number is something between 284–320) The Finns captured 25 Soviet airmen on the Karelian Isthmus during the summer of 1944. The Finnish army reported that 8,561 men were wounded, missing, and/or killed in action. According to Finnish historian Ohto Manninen, the Soviets reported their losses as about 18,000–22,000 killed or wounded, based on the daily and 10-day summary casualty reports of the Soviet 21st Army. The uncertainty about casualties rises from the fact that 25 percent of the forces of the 21st Army didn't participate in the battle. In addition to the losses of the Soviet 21st Army, the 6th Rifle Corps of the Soviet 23rd Army that attacked east of the 21st Army closer to Vuoksi waterway suffered 7905 casualties, of which 1458 were killed in action (KIA) and 288 missing in action (MIA), without taking the losses of its supporting formations into account.

== Impact ==
The cease-fire between the Soviet Union and Finland began at 07:00, September 4, 1944, although for the following 24 hours the Red Army failed to comply with it.

According to historians Jowett & Snodgrass, Mcateer, Lunde, and Alanen & Moisala, the Battle of Tali–Ihantala, along with other Finnish victories (in the battles of Vyborg Bay, Vuosalmi, Nietjärvi, and Ilomantsi) achieved during the period, finally convinced the Soviet leadership that conquering Finland was proving difficult, and not worth the cost; the battle was possibly the single most important battle fought in the Continuation War, as it largely determined the final outcome of the war, allowing Finland to conclude the war with relatively favorable terms and continue its existence as an autonomous, democratic, and independent nation. Finnish researchers state that Soviet sources, such as POW interviews, prove that the Soviets intended to advance all the way to Helsinki. There also existed an order from Stavka to advance far beyond the borders of 1940.

According to Lunde, one of the reasons leading to the Soviet failure was the Finns were able to intercept the Soviet radio messages and to forewarn and prompt the Finnish Army to put up a firmly resolved defense. Also, the existence of the Finnish Salpa Defence Line was an important factor in the peace negotiations in autumn 1944.

== Related operations ==
On June 22, Soviet forces began a wide-front push into Eastern Poland and Belorussia.

At the same time, the Soviet 59th Army attacked the islands in Vyborg Bay from July 4 on, and after several days of fighting forced the vastly outnumbered Finnish forces out from most of the islands while suffering heavy losses. However, the Soviet attack aimed at crossing Vyborg Bay was a failure as the Soviet troops were thrown back by the German 122nd Division of the V AK.

The Soviet 23rd Army attempted to start the crossing of the River Vuoksi on July 4 at Vuosalmi, but due to the Finnish defense at Äyräpää Ridge, it was unable to start the crossing before July 9. Even with the crossing completed, the Soviet forces consisting of elements from three Soviet divisions were not able to expand the beachhead against the defending Finnish 2nd Division, which was later reinforced. The unsuccessful Soviet breakthrough attempts continued there until July 21.

In addition to Tali–Ihantala, the Finnish front line held fast at Kivisilta and Tienhaara to the north of Vyborg Bay. There was further heavy fighting on the northeast side of Lake Ladoga, and in the Battle of Ilomantsi the Finns were able to encircle two Soviet divisions, though most of the troops were able to escape.

On July 12, Soviet troops received an order to stop their attempts to advance and to dig in. Soon, Finnish scouts noticed trains with empty cars advancing towards Vyborg to take troops away from the Finnish front. They were needed for the great push towards Berlin.

The Finnish government declined further negotiations in late June and did not ask for peace until the Soviet offensive had been stopped. The Finnish government instead used the Ryti-Ribbentrop agreement to strengthen Finnish forces. Only after the Soviet offensive had been stopped on all primary fronts, was President Ryti ready to resign on July 28. He, together with leading social-democrat Väinö Tanner, requested that Commander-in-Chief Mannerheim accept the candidacy for president, thus freeing Finland from the Ryti-Ribbentrop agreement, which had only been made as a personal pledge of President Ryti. Finland then could ask the Soviet Union for peace.

== See also ==
- Tali-Ihantala 1944 (film)
