= Harparskog Line =

Retired Finnish defensive line across the Hanko Peninsula, Finland

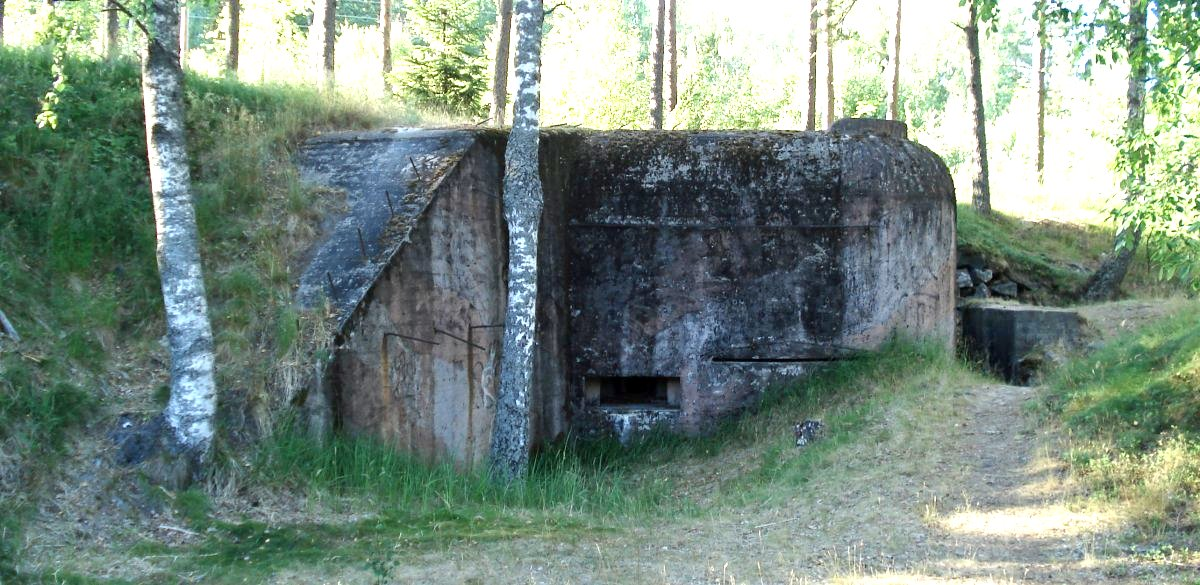
Harparskog Line Bunker 1

Harparskog Line was the main defense station and military fortification built by the Finns after the Winter War of 1940–1941 on the border of Hanko.

== Details ==
This line was not fully completed at the beginning of the Continuation War and remained unused at the Battle of Hanko. But the existence of this defense line made it possible to transfer troops from the Hanko area to the east in July–August 1941. Major Komola was responsible for the construction of this line. The line ran from Westerwick in Wetlax Brumarrow west to east south of Cerlanted Island to Bagu District.

By the end of May 1941, 46 concrete shelters on the Harparskog line were ready for operation and 141 trenches were under construction. There were also 46 ready cannons, 13 cannons under construction and 113 machine gun positions under construction. A total of 57.8 km of barbed wire barriers and 3.8 km of tank barriers were built in this line.

The structures of the Harparskog line are largely preserved. The monument to the line is located at the place where Carl Gustav Emil Mannerheim crossed on 15 December 1941. The name of this line is taken from the village it passes through.

== Line Composition ==
The most common structures in the Harparskog Line were combined anti-tank and machine gun bunkers and single machine gun bunkers. Almost every bunker in the line was equipped with a M.1940 armored observation turret, but none of the bunkers contained a machine gun dome, unlike any other defensive line in Finland. It was possible to modify the M.1940 observation dome to mount a Suomi machine gun, as well as a periscope. The Harparskog Line stretches 5km across the Hanko Peninsula, and continues for another 35km along the islands and lakes on either side.

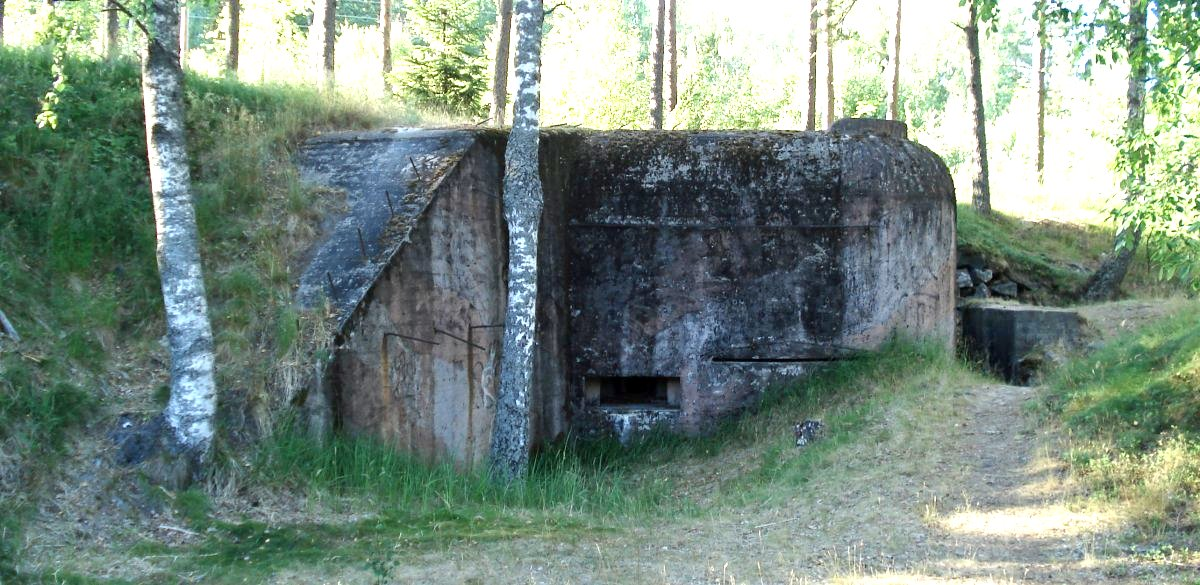
A #200 style machine gun bunker.

The #200 designation means it is an armed shelter

The #300 designation means a machine gun and anti-tank bunker (Except Bunker 303 and 304.)

The #100 and #400 designation means it is an unarmed shelter

Because of the numbering designation, the bunkers are catalogued starting in the south, ending in the north, not by number.

South-West

The Harparskog Line starts on the South-west side of the Hanko Peninsula and stretches almost 40km across the peninsula and surrounding islands.

Bunker 214: “Object” 214, was armed with a Maxim heavy machine gun, and had a cave shelter. The bunker has since somehow disappeared, as surveys cannot find it.

Bunker 307 “Sirkka”: Next is a large shelter numbered 307 that housed a machine gun and anti-tank gun, just like the ones of the Toikkala Line. The bunker contains a 37mm Bofors anti-tank gun and a Maxim machine gun, both in vertical casemates. The bunker is also equipped with a M.1940 observation dome with 6 slits.

Shelter 453: The bunker was built out of reinforced concrete, and the concrete was sealed with a thick layer of tar to keep out the weather. The bunker was equipped with a machine gun and a periscope that led up to a M.1940 observation dome.

Bunker 306 “Asta”: Behind Bunker 453 is Bunker 306, nicknamed “Asta”. The bunker was armed with a Maxim machine gun, 37mm Bofors anti-tank gun and a M.1940 armored observation dome. The bunker’s armament is located in vertical casemates, just like Bunker 307.

Bunker 304 "Lytti".

Bunker 304 “Lyyti": Located near the main road is Bunker 304. The bunker was built to house 20 men and provide flanking fire to a force advancing up the road. Flanking fire was supplied by a Maxim heavy machine gun and a M.1940 observation dome on the top of the structure.

Shelter 452 “Lissu”: Shelter 452 is located near the main highway, and was equipped with a M.1940 observation dome. The bunker housed 40 men, including crew. An emergency exit was located on the roof, near the observation dome. Most of the bunker’s equipment has been well preserved, the bunker less so.

Bunker 303 “Lilli”: Bunker 303 is located near the village of Harparskog, and was armed with a Maxim heavy machine gun. Interestingly, the bunker does not have an observation dome, which is rare for Finnish machine gun bunkers. Today, the doorway has been sealed to keep people from entering. The bunker is a mirror version of Bunker 304.

Shelters 451 “Helmi" and 455 “Brita”: These bunkers are located in people’s gardens so not much is known about their current status. What is known is that they were meant to accommodate 40 men and were equipped with M.1940 observation domes.

Bunker 302 “Irma”: Bunker 302 “Irma” is located near the village of Harparskog, and is a museum today. The bunker was armed with a Maxim heavy machine gun, M.1937 45mm captured Soviet anti-tank gun, and a M.1940 rotating observation dome. The bunker has been fully restored to its wartime design and contains weapons and supplies dating from 1940. The bunker is able to be toured today, and is near a main highway leading to Hanko.

Bunker 213A: Bunker 213A was a machine gun bunker built into the solid rock near Bunker 302. The bunker is located on the Northern end of Harparskog Village.

Bunker 213B: Bunker 213B was a machine gun bunker built into the solid rock near Bunker 302. The bunker is located on the Northern end of Harparskog Village. The bunker was equipped with a Maxim heavy machine gun and a M.1940 observation dome. Bunker 213A and B are located directly next to each other.

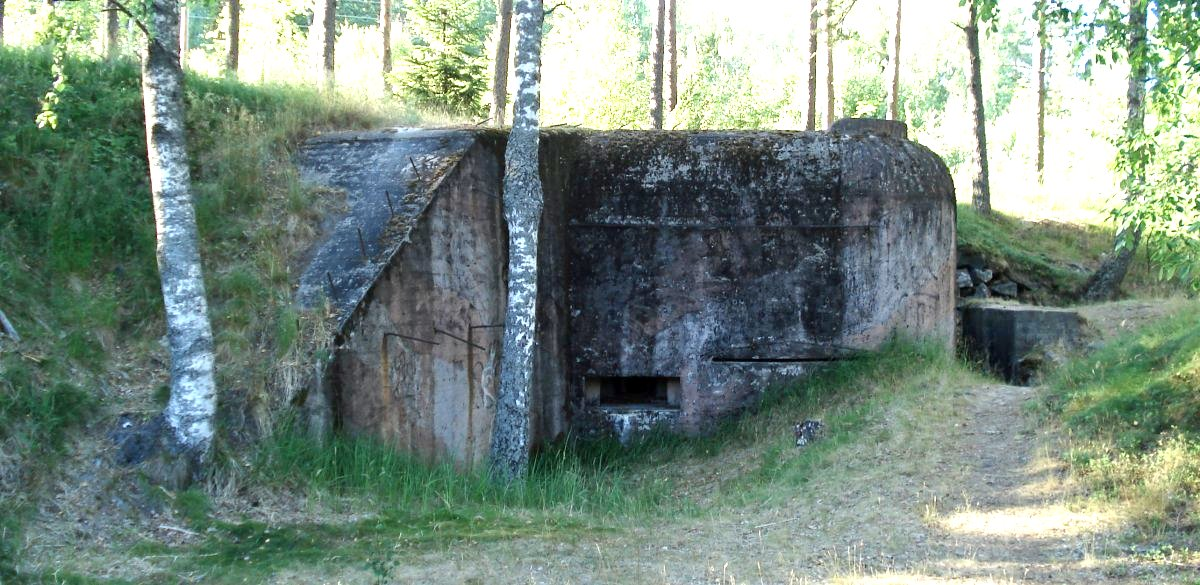
Bunker 301 "Jukka"

Bunker 301 “Jukka”: Located near the monument to Field Marshal Mannerheim is Bunker 301. The bunker was armed with a Maxim heavy machine gun, M.1937 45mm captured Soviet anti-tank gun, and a M.1940 observation dome. The bunker housed 20 men, including the 16 man crew. The main task of the bunker was to offer anti-tank fire on any armored vehicle trying to cross the nearby swamp or granite anti-tank obstacles. The bunker is overgrown today, and the equipment inside has been preserved very well.

Bunker 212A: Bunker 212A is located across from Bunker 301 on a granite hillside. The bunker was armed with a Maxim heavy machine gun. The bunker did have an armored observation dome like many bunkers despite it was made almost completely out of rock.

Bunker 212B: Bunker 212B is the exact same as Bunker 212A, and is connected via a passage in the rock.

Shelter 212C: Shelter 212C was located in the rock next to Bunkers 212A and B. The shelter was connected to both bunkers and housed their crew. Next to Shelter 212C was an unfinished 7.6cm anti-tank gun shelter that was unfinished when the Soviets abandoned the Hanko Peninsula in June 1941.

Shelter 199: Shelter 199 was a crew shelter located near Bunker 211, and was almost completely underground. The shelter was most likely connected to the nearby Bunker 211 and housed its crew. The entrance has been sealed to keep people out of the shelter.

Bunker 211: Bunker 211 was equipped with a Maxim machine gun in a casemate and a M.1940 observation dome. The bunker is almost completely underground, except for the observation dome and the machine gun embrasure wall. The bunker has been sealed off to keep people out.

Bunker 215: Bunker 215 is located near Lake Vitsjön to the west of Harparskog. The bunker was equipped with a Maxim heavy machine gun and a M.1940 observation dome on the roof of the structure.

Shelter 454: On the northwestern shore Lake Vitsjön is Shelter 454, near the main highway. The bunker was equipped with a M.1940 observation dome.

Bunker 305: Bunker 305 was located on the shores of a lake east of Harparskog. The bunker was armed with a Maxim heavy machine gun, Soviet M.1937 45mm anti-tank gun, and a M.1940 observation dome.

Bunker 219: Bunker 219 is located near the main road, and is now in a drainage ditch. The bunker is currently flooded and damage assessments have not been made since it is flooded. The bunker was equipped with a Maxim machine gun and a M.1940 observation dome.

Bunker 216: Bunker 216 was never completed but provides an interesting visual for the layout of a Finnish bunker. The remains of the bunker are located in a hole near Lake Vitsjön. The bunker was supposed to be mostly made out of rock and was supposed to be equipped with a Maxim heavy machine gun and a M.1940 observation dome.
