= Toikkala Line =

Military fortification group in South Karelia, Finland

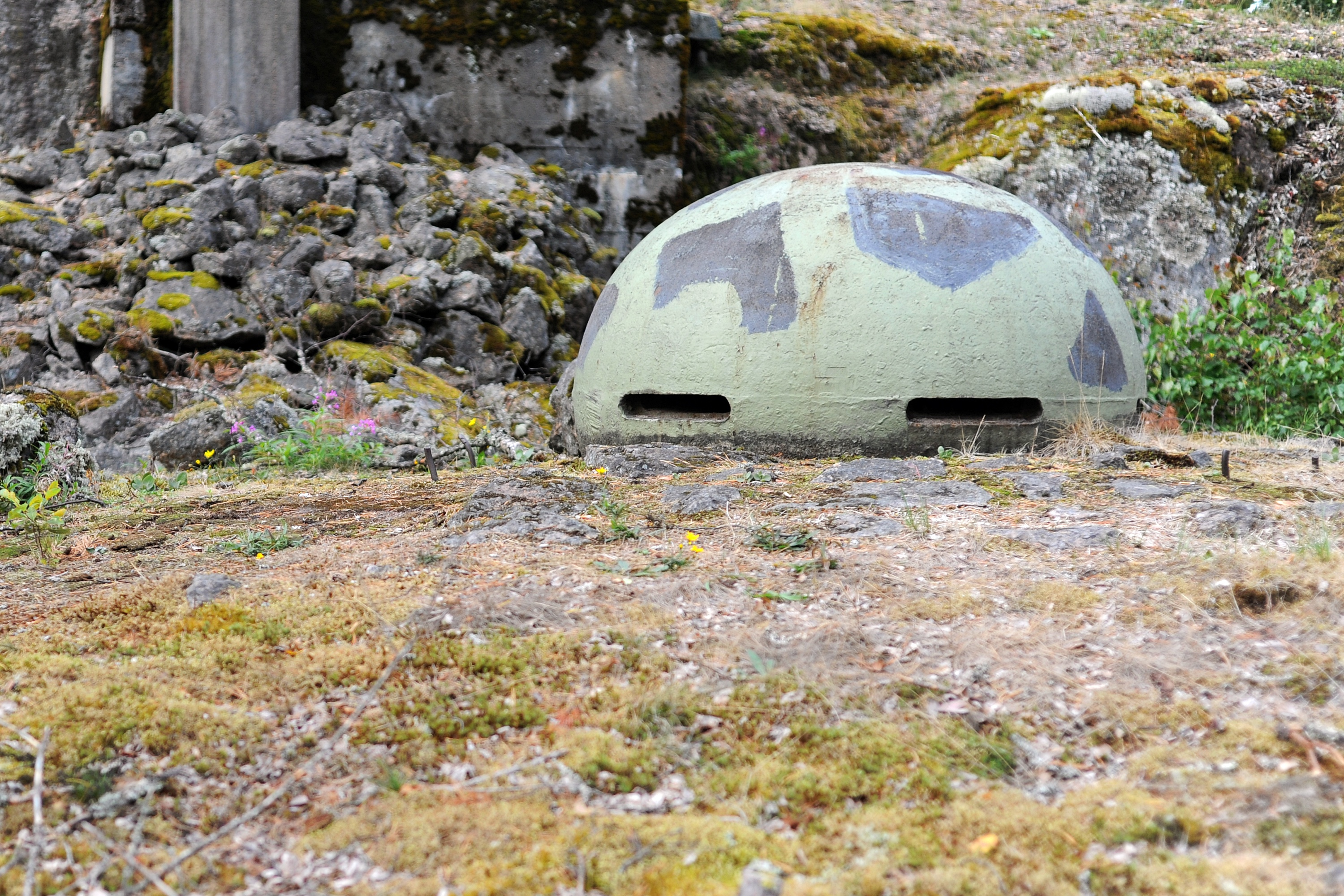
A M.1940 armored observation dome like the ones emplaced in the Toikkala Line.

The Toikkala Defensive Line is a Finnish fortification group located in South Karelia, just in front of the Salpa Line. While the fortifications of the Toikkala Line are technically part of the Salpa Line, they are considered different. The Toikkala Line is also known as the Salpa-Asema Strongpoint. The Toikkala line is located east of the municipality of Askola, Luumäki, Finland. The fortifications in and around Luumaki were some of the most modern in Finland at the time, since they featured reinforced concrete, armored tank turrets, and anti-tank obstacles. Work on the line began in 1941 by the order of Marshal Gustav Mannerheim. Instead of being a continuous line of fortifications, the defenses are located in easily controlled places with natural obstacles.

The fortifications were extensively camouflaged. Within the Luumaki sector alone there were 120 different fortifications, making it one of the most heavily fortified sections of the Salpa Line, and even Finland. The sector was also one of the most modern, as most fortifications were protected by anti-tank defenses and were armed with machine guns in armored domes or reinforced concrete structures. Within the Luumaki defensive area is a position called “Salpa-Asema”, which literally translates to “Latch/Bolt Position”. This was a heavily fortified strongpoint, one of the strongest in the Salpa Line.

== Toikkala Line Fortifications Around Askola ==
Located near the small village of Askola are 33 reinforced concrete structures ranging from simple barracks to combined anti-tank and machine gun bunkers. These were located in sandy, forested terrain on the Salpausselkä Ridge. Here, the Salpa and Toikkala Lines come together, with the Toikkala located in front of Askola as delaying positions. These were mainly anti-tank obstacles, some light shelters with machine guns, and even fewer combined anti-tank and machine gun bunkers, equipped with observation domes on top. The total defense was about 3 km deep around Askola.

=== Anti-Tank and Machine Gun Bunker C10 ===
Anti-Tank and Machine Gun Bunker C10 is part of the second line of defenses, and its guns cover the Southern end of the Toikkala Line. The machine gun and the anti-tank gun are in separate areas, but both were mounted in steel embrasures. Bunker C10 is constructed like MG Bunker C11, but is longer. The machine gun is on the first vertical terrace, like Bunker C11. The anti-tank gun is on a much larger vertical terrace located behind the machine gun.

The entrance was guarded by an embrasure in which small arms could be fired out of, and still contains the original weapon mountings. Bunker C10 was built using reinforced concrete, and above the living quarters and weapons stations was a thick steel plate as extra protection. The bunker was connected to the others in the Askola Sector by a wireless radio antenna. Located on the roof of the bunker was a M.1940 armored observation dome. Bunker C10 was equipped with steel rings where vegetation could be attached as camouflage. Wavy patterns were also made using spray concrete to make it stand out less.

The entrance to Bunker C10; the small slit was for small arms to be fired out of.

=== Machine Gun Bunker C11 ===
Machine Gun Bunker C11 was 1 of 2 center fortifications located around Askola, and was part of the Salpa-Asema strongpoint. Bunker C11 could garrison 20 men, making it a large bunker compared to many European bunkers. The bunker was constructed out of reinforced concrete, while usual for the Toikkala and Salpa Lines, it is rare for other lines such as the VKT and VT-lines. Bunker C11 measures 2m x 2m, and has an escarpment wall on the right side as you look out the frontal machine gun embrasure. Next to the frontal machine gun embrasure, is a thin observation slit that faces forward. The bunker also has a typical Finnish observation turret dating from 1940.

Bunker C11 in 2016.

Bunker C11 is located on the southern side of the main road leading to Askola, and could provide flanking fire to any advancing force. The interior is still partially furnished, and still contains the steel embrasure for the frontal-firing machine gun.

=== Machine Gun Bunker C12 ===
Machine Gun Bunker C12 is part of the main defenses of the Toikkala Line and is located almost directly in front of the village of Askola. The bunker was built with reinforced concrete, and contains multiple machine gun embrasures. Bunker C12 was meant to deliver flanking fire to any force that advanced down the road towards Askola. C12 was armed with 2 water-cooled Maxim machine guns, 1 facing forward and the other covering the entrance. Also located on the top of the bunker was an observation bell with a 360 degree view. The fortified position is just like MG Bunker C11, just across the road. Both have 2 machine guns and a BT-5 tank turret.

The M.1940 armored observation dome located on Bunker C12.

=== Anti-Tank and Accommodation Bunker C59 ===
Bunker C59 is a dual-purpose bunker, housing an anti-tank gun while providing a safe shelter for some of the crew of the Toikkala Line. Bunker C59 is located in the second line of defense of the Toikkala Line. Bunker C59 is one of many various types of bunkers constructed in the Toikkala Line and was supposed to host anywhere between 20 and 40 men, including the bunker’s crew. This wasn't the case, however, because the anti-tank gun took up so much space. On top of the structure was a M.1940 armored observation turret. Quite rarely, Bunker C59 has a “gas lock” to prevent poison gas from leaking in. The entrance to the bunker was actually where the anti-tank gun would be wheeled to during combat, which is almost unheard of in 20th-century fortifications.

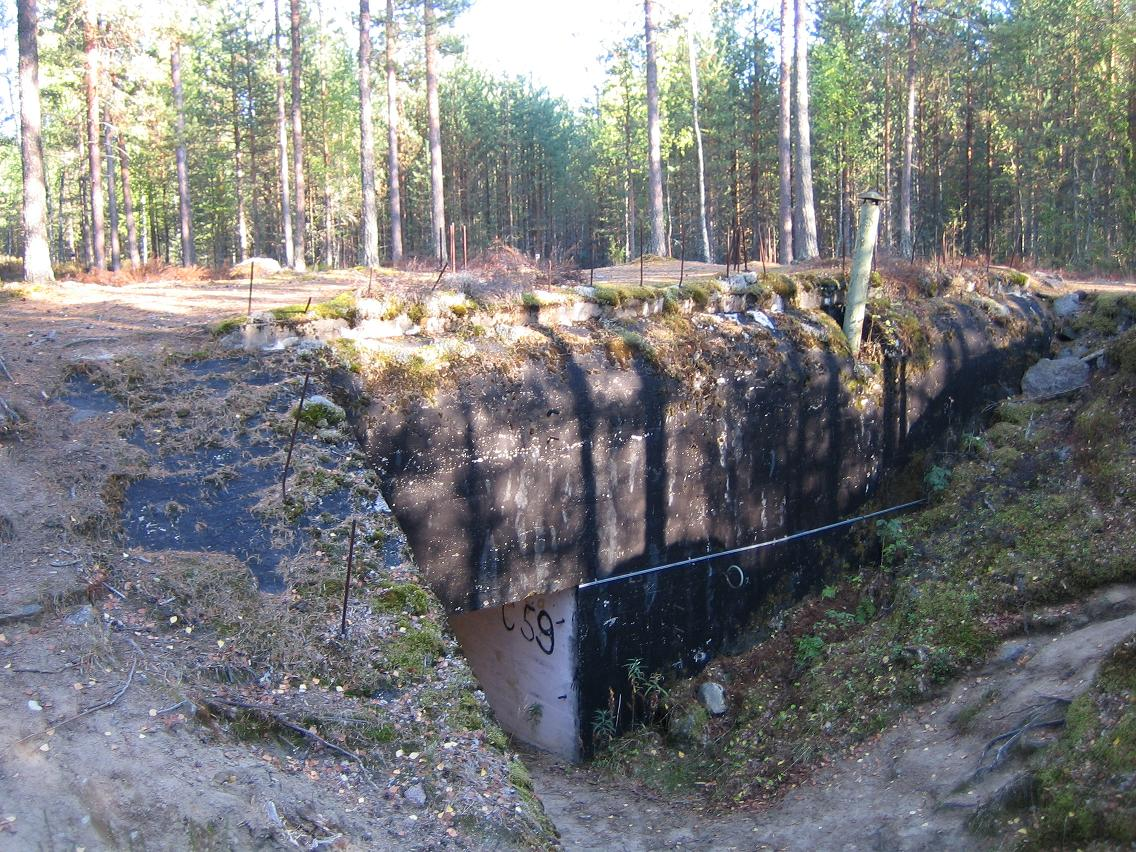
Bunker C59 in 2008.

West of the bunker, was an anti-tank ditch meant to stop any armored vehicles that broke through the first line of defenses. A trench leading from the bunker went to the anti-tank ditch, and the 3rd and final line of defenses. To the south was an open machine gun nest that could provide supporting fire for Bunker C59.

=== Anti-Tank and Accommodation Bunker C60 ===
Bunker C60 is located in Salpa-Asema strongpoint, also known as the Toikkala Line, just behind the main line of defenses. Bunker C60 is one of many various types of bunkers constructed in the Toikkala Line, and was supposed to host anywhere between 20 and 40 men, including the bunker’s crew. Like Bunker C59, the bunker’s accommodation was limited to 10 men because of the anti-tank gun. Inside, a steep staircase leads to a M.1940 armored observation dome.

=== Machine Gun Bunker 706 ===
MG Bunker 706 is a small bunker located south of Bunker C11, and is part of the first line of defenses. MG bunker 706 was one of the newer additions to the Toikkala Line, since the armored cupola dates to 1943. Beneath the armored cupola we see today, is a small bunker with a manually-operated ventilation system, small stove, and a water-cooling system for the Maxim Machine Gun. A ladder led up to the cupola, where the gunner and his observer would have to climb ladder and sit on little benches to do their respective tasks. The bunker was accessed via a trench that led up to the back of the position. Position 706 is one of only 25 positions in the Salpa Line equipped with this type of armored cupola. An armored cupola just like the one at MG Bunker 706 is on display at the Finnish Artillery Museum in Hämeenlinna.

MG Bunker 706. Its design was rare, enabling both a gunner and a spotter to work in the same dome.

=== Stationary Obstacles and Anti-Tank Defenses ===
Granite anti-tank obstacles near the main road leading to Askola.

Located in front of the first defensive line was 4 rows of granite anti-tank obstacles. Originally, the granite blocks were placed vertically, but tests in 1943 proved horizontal blocks were more effective, so the blocks were repositioned horizontally. Directly behind the 4 rows of anti-tank blocks, was several lines of barbed wire meant to slow and deter infantry. Since the anti-tank obstacles were far enough forward from the barbed wire, the infantry couldn't rely on armored vehicles to breach the wire for them. Behind the barbed wire was a 2m deep anti-tank ditch, meant as a last ditch attempt to immobilize any armored vehicle that broke through. Anti-tank ditches are also seen in the second and third lines of defense, especially around Bunker C59. The ditches stopped right in front of Bunker C10 and continued on the other side of the bunker. BT-5 Tank Turret 1340 is located directly next to Machine Gun Bunker C11, which served as an anti-tank position for bunker C11. The tank turret was most likely taken from a knocked out Soviet BT-5. Located next to Bunker C12 is a Soviet BT-5 tank turret emplaced in a concrete trench accessed from the rear. The turret was emplaced there in 1944, and is numbered 1341. Located West of Bunker C60 is a Soviet BT-5 tank turret dating from 1944. The turret is accessed via a trench and is placed on a concrete housing. The turret’s number is 1342.
