= Vilho Petter Nenonen =

Finnish general (1883–1960)

Vilho Petteri Nenonen
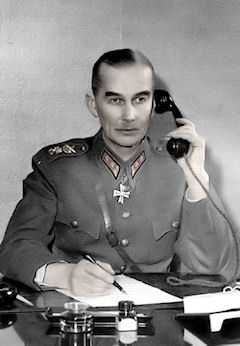
- Artillery general Vilho Nenonen
- Born: 6 March 1883; Kuopio, Grand Duchy of Finland
- Died: 17 February 1960 (aged 76); Helsinki, Finland
- Burial place: Hietaniemi Cemetery
- Military career
- Allegiance: Russian Empire (1901–1917); White Finland (1918); Finland (1918–1947)
- Branch: Imperial Russian Army; White Guard; Finnish Army
- Service years: 1901–1947
- Rank: Lieutenant Colonel (Russia); General of the Artillery (Finland)
- Conflicts: World War I; Finnish Civil War; World War II; Winter War; Continuation War
- Awards: Mannerheim Cross 2nd class

Vilho Petter Nenonen (6 March 1883 – 17 February 1960) was a Finnish general of the Artillery and the most important developer of modern artillery for independent Finland.

Nenonen was born in Kuopio. He received his military education in the Hamina Cadet School 1896–1901, in the Mihailov Artillery School in St Petersburg 1901–1903, and in St Petersburg Artillery Academy 1906–1909. He served in the Imperial Russian army during World War I. When the Finnish Civil War began, he moved to Finland and was given the job of creating the artillery of general Mannerheim's White Army.

After the Civil War, Nenonen's position was abolished as the Germans took over the organisation of the Finnish army and had no place for former Russian officers. He was transferred to the then little-regarded coastal artillery. The situation changed after Germany's defeat in November 1918, and Nenonen was appointed Inspector of Artillery in May 1920, a post he held for nearly two decades.

In the late 1920s, Nenonen participated in the development of a camera for aerial photography and was a pioneer of topographical aerial photography in Finland, a field that remained the preserve of the artillery until the Second World War.

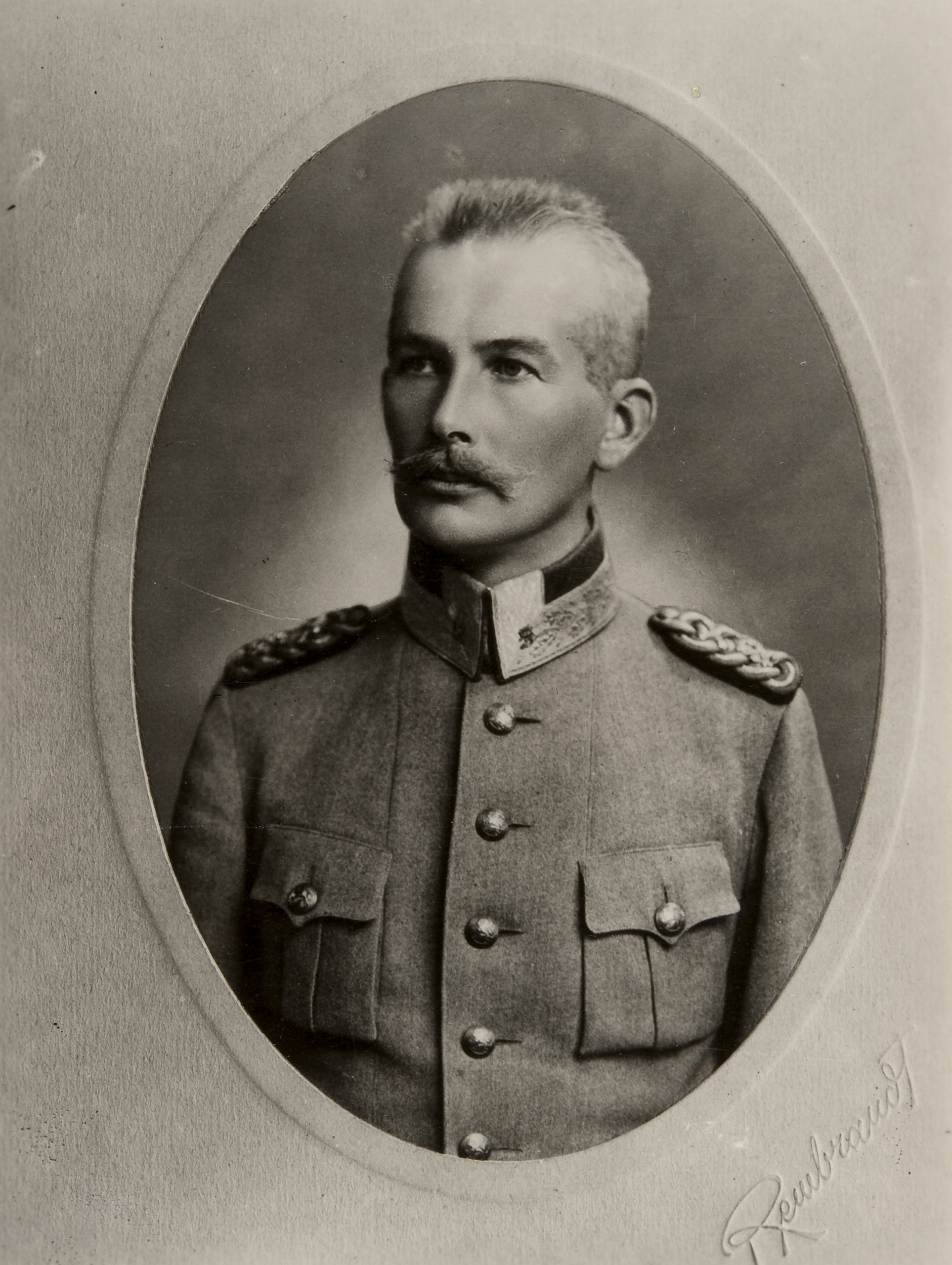
Portrait of Nenonen

A remarkable episode in Nenonen's personal life was his secret journeys to revolutionary Russia to find the Skryabin sisters, two officers' wives he had befriended in Vladivostok before the war, whose husbands had been lost in the revolution. In the spring of 1921 he travelled to Moscow on a diplomatic passport. The elder of the sisters had already died, and in order to bring the younger, Pelagea, along with her mother and the sisters' daughters out of the country, Nenonen married her. He later adopted the sisters' daughters in Finland.

After the war, Nenonen also served as the Minister of Defence between 1923 and 1924. During the Continuation War, he was a part of Mannerheim's inner circle. He was promoted to the rank of General of the artillery in 1941 and remains the only person to have held the rank.

As Finnish Defence Forces' Inspector of the Artillery, Nenonen played a large role in developing the Finnish artillery's training, equipment, and tactics. For example, the Fire Correction Circle developed in 1943 proved decisive in the defensive victory in the Battle of Tali-Ihantala in 1944 and was made standard equipment of the Finnish artillery by an order issued by Nenonen in July 1943. The trajectory calculation formulas he developed are still in use today by all modern artillery.

Nenonen received the Mannerheim Cross in 1945. In 1950 he was awarded an honorary doctorate by the University of Helsinki.

His medals and personal history are on display in The Artillery Museum of Finland. Nenonen is buried at the Hietaniemi Cemetery.
