= 7th Division (Finland, Winter War) =

- 7. Divisioona
- Active: January 1940 – March 1940
- Country: Finland
- Branch: Army
- Type: Division
- Engagements: World War II: Winter War

Commanders
- Notable commanders: Major-General Einar Vihma

The 7th Division was a unit of the Finnish Army during the Winter War. It was formed in January 1940 by renumbering the 10th Division in the hope of convincing the Soviets that it had been replaced by fresh troops. The unit was commanded throughout the rest of the Winter War by Major-General Einar Vihma.

== Service history ==
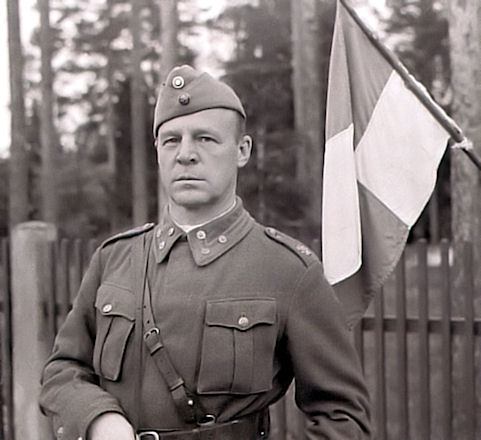
Einar Vihma

The 7th Division was formed in January 1940 at Taipale, during the Winter War, the defence against the Soviet invasion. The division was formed by renumbering the 10th Division. The latter had been long in action and worn out but there were not enough Finnish reserves to allow it to be rotated out of the line. It was decided to renumber the division in the hope of convincing the opposing Soviet forces that it had been replaced by a fresh formation. The unit was commanded by Major-General Einar Vihma from 9 January 1940 to the end of the Winter War with the March 1940 Moscow Peace Treaty. Many of the division's men had been engaged in combat since the start of the war in late 1939. As well as its own field artillery regiment, the division was reinforced with a heavy artillery battery and two other batteries sent from the eastern Karelian Isthmus.

By the end of January 1940 the 7th Division was supported by the newly raised and poorly equipped 21st Division. The men of the 7th Division, in their dirty and torn snow camouflage, dubbed the newcomers the "porcelain boys" or "porcelain division" for their clean clothing.

The 7th Division faced the Soviet 3rd Rifle Corps. The Soviet offensive resumed on 18 February with the corps' 49th and 150th Rifle Divisions tasked with breaking through the 7th Division to capture strategic roads. The two Soviet divisions were reinforced by corps commander Vladimir Grendahl who assigned the 101st Rifle Regiment, the 97th Ski Battalion and a tank battalion, as well as six additional artillery batteries. The Soviet advance enjoyed initial success in this sector.

A separate formation, also called the 7th Division fought for Finland in the Continuation War of 1941–1944.
