= Salpa Line =

Bunker line on the eastern border of Finland

- Eastern Finland
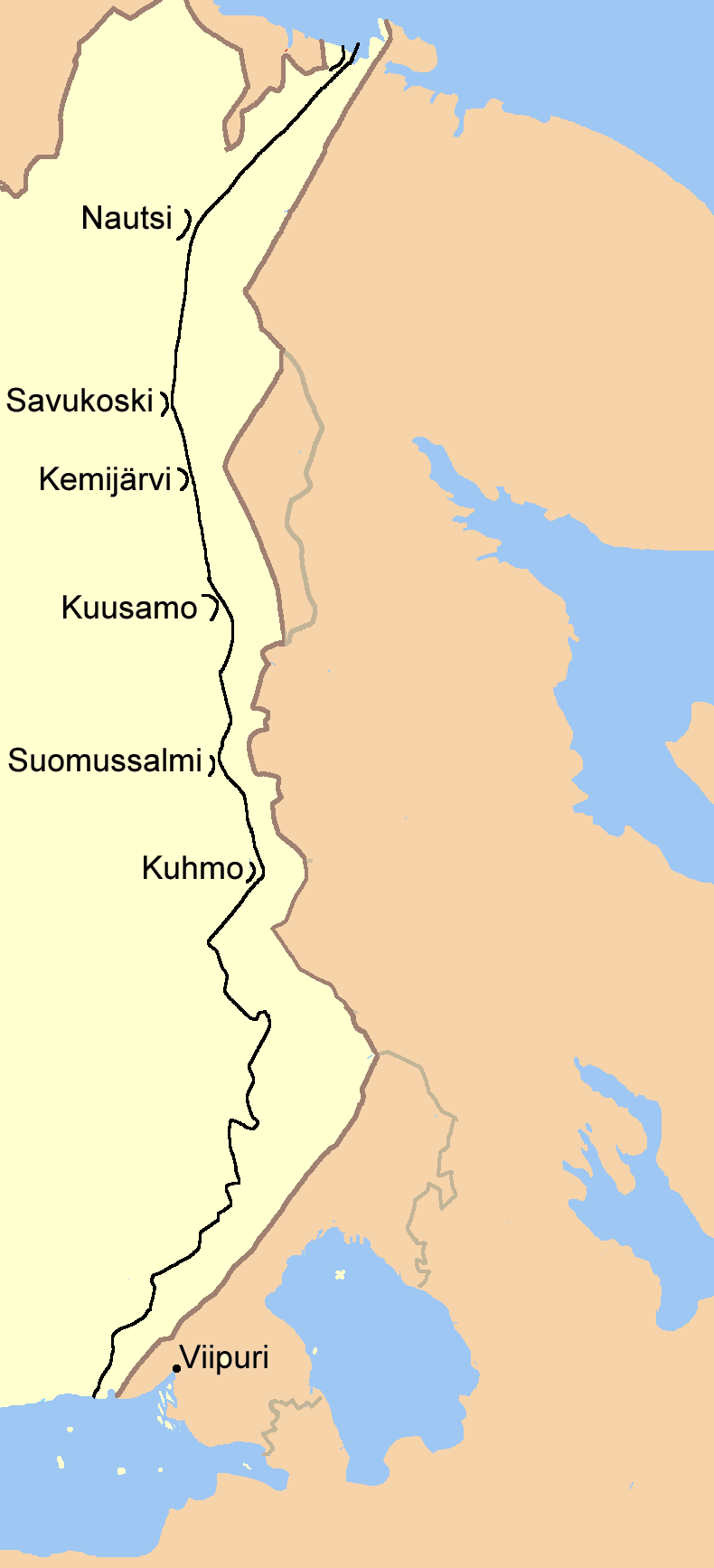

Site information
- Type: Defense line
- Controlled by: Finland

Site history
- Built: 1940–44
- In use: 1941–44
- Materials: Concrete, steel, natural features
- Battles/wars: Continuation War

Garrison information
- Garrison: Reserve

The Salpa Line (Finnish: Salpalinja, lit. 'Latch Line'; Swedish: Salpalinjen), or its official name, Suomen Salpa ('Finland's Latch'), is a defense line on the eastern border of Finland. It was built in 1940–41 during the Interim Peace between the Winter War and the Continuation War and further in 1944 to defend Finland against a possible Soviet invasion.

The line is 1,200 kilometres long, stretching from the Gulf of Finland to Petsamo (now Pechenga, Russia). It never saw military action because the Soviet offensive in 1944 was stopped at the VKT-line on the Karelian Isthmus. The fortifications of the Salpa Line were significantly more complete and stronger than those of the Mannerheim Line.

== Construction ==
The planning of the Salpa Line was commissioned by general Rudolf Walden and the construction began at the end of the Winter War in 1940. At first, volunteers worked there—then people ineligible for the war service were mobilized. The maximum number of workers, on site was near 35,000 in the spring of 1941. After the beginning of the Continuation War on 25 June 1941 the fortification work was stopped, pillboxes and bunkers were stripped of armaments, which were sent to the front. As the tide of the conflict turned, and the front began to approach the prewar Finnish borders in early 1944, the work on the Salpa Line resumed and continued until the end of the Continuation War on 4 September 1944.

== Line composition and terrain ==
728 various concrete installations, 315 km of wire obstacles, 225 km of anti-tank obstacles, 130 km of anti-tank ditches, more than 3,000 entrenchments, 254 concrete infantry shelters, trenches, rifleman's cells and dugouts composed the power and strength of this defence line. The line even employed old 11 and 9 inch coastal mortars from the late 19th century, due to unavailability of more modern artillery.

Numerous lakes, marshes and small rocks were also incorporated in the defence line. For example, the Lake Saimaa area is a labyrinth of lakes of varying sizes, islands, straits and rivers, making the area very easy to defend. 90% of all the concrete installations of the Salpa Line were on the line between the Gulf of Finland and the Lake Saimaa waterway system. This part, as the original post-Winter War defence line, was also referred with the name "Luumäki-Suomenlahti-linja" (Luumäki-Gulf of Finland line) or simply as "Luumäen linja" (Lake Saimaa is situated north of Luumäki).

== Impact on the war ==
The fortifications were never used in combat because the Red Army was stopped at the end of the Continuation War well before its advance units reached Salpa (see Battle of Tali-Ihantala). The line was partially manned with old reservists in the summer of 1944. The existence of the fortified line was an advantage for the Finns in the subsequent peace talks.

== Present day ==
The remains of the decommissioned line serve as a tourist attraction. On the southernmost part of the Salpa Line is located the Salpa Line Museum (Salpa linja -museo) that was founded in 1987 by the Miehikkälä municipality and the Second World War veteran organisations.

== Gallery ==
=== Maps ===
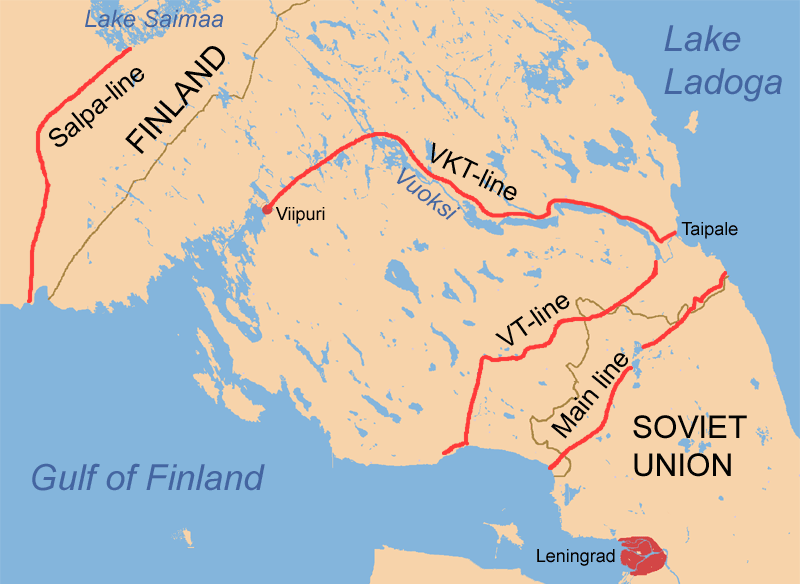
Start of the Salpa Line between Lake Saimaa and the Gulf of Finland. The line continues up to the Northern Finland. Also shown are the VT-line and the VKT-line.

=== Kymenlaakso and South Karelia ===
Municipality	Place	Name	WGS 84	Description
Lappeenranta		The bunker tour		
Lappeenranta	Ylämaa	The Salpa Line		
Luumäki		Salpa and Toikkala Lines		3km deep defenses near the village of Askola. The Toikkala Line was an advanced position of the Salpa Line. See the Toikkala Line Page for more info.
Lemi	Kärmeniemi	The gun battery and ball casemate		
Lemi	Juvola	The gun battery remains of the four 280 mm naval mortars of the year 1877 from the Continuation War. No mortars left.		
Miehikkälä		The Salpa Line Museum		
Miehikkälä	Myllylampi			Built-up cultural environments of national importance
Miehikkälä	Kylmälä			Built-up cultural environments of national importance
Miehikkälä	Kuntakeskuksen alue (Municipal center area)			Built-up cultural environments of national importance
Miehikkälä	Muurikkala			Built-up cultural environments of national importance
Ruokolahti		The Salpa Line area of Syyslahti		
Taipalsaari	Jauhiala			Built-up cultural environments of national importance
Virolahti		The Virolahti Bunker Museum		
Virolahti	Mustamaa	Mustamaa island		Built-up cultural environments of national importance
Virolahti	Säkäjärvi			Built-up cultural environments of national importance
Virolahti	Ylä-Pihlaja			Built-up cultural environments of national importance
Virolahti	Santasaari	South-East part of Santasaari island		Built-up cultural environments of national importance
Virolahti	Ravijoki			Built-up cultural environments of national importance
Virolahti	Ravijoki			Built-up cultural environments of national importance
Virolahti	Saarasjärvi	East beach of Saarasjärvi		Built-up cultural environments of national importance
Virolahti	Säkäjärvi			Built-up cultural environments of national importance

Built-up cultural environments of national importance refers to the official classification of The National Board of Antiquities of Finland.

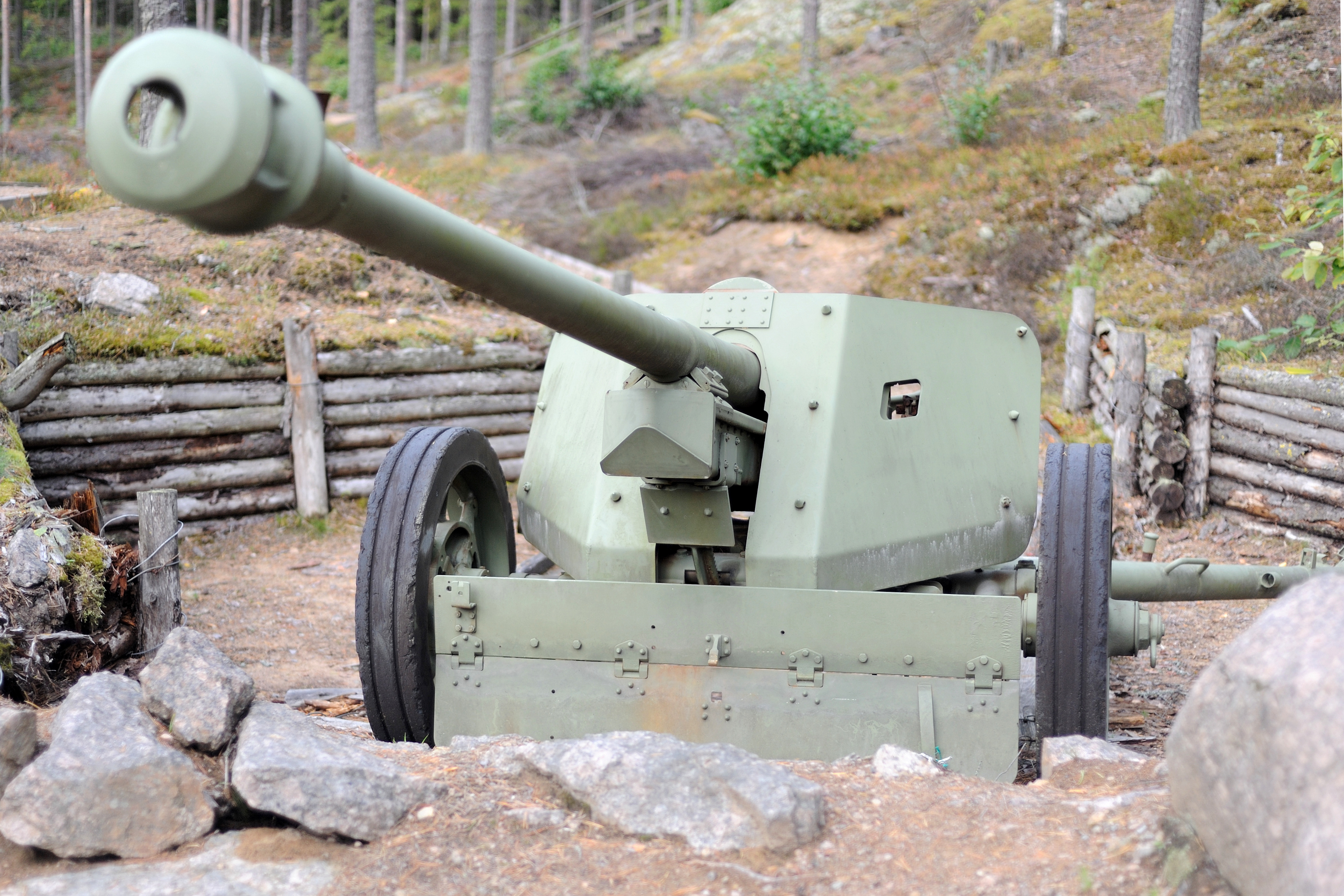
7.5 cm Panzerabwehrkanone 40 in the Salpa Line Museum #360

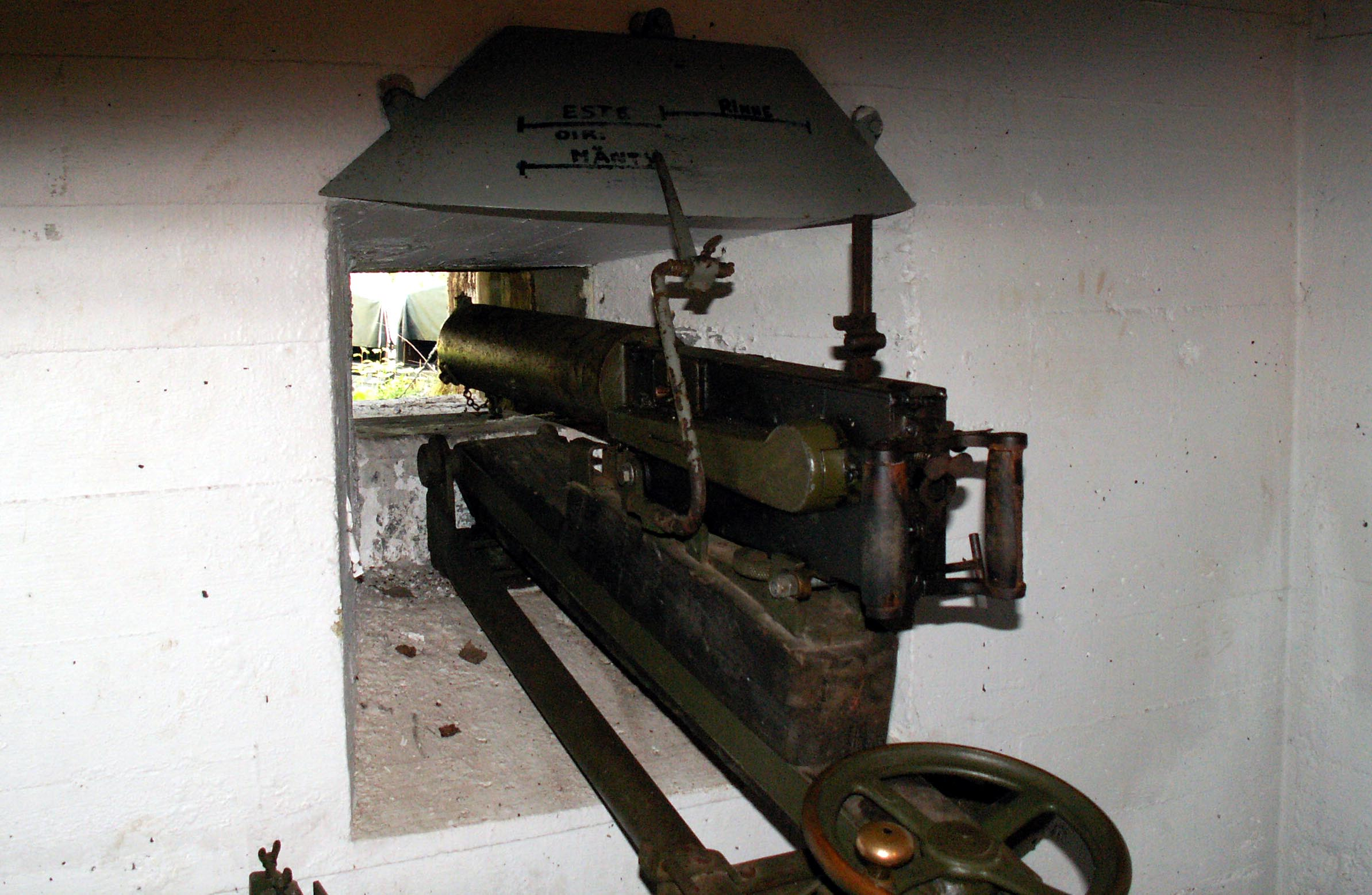
A machine gun bunker in the Salpa Line Museum

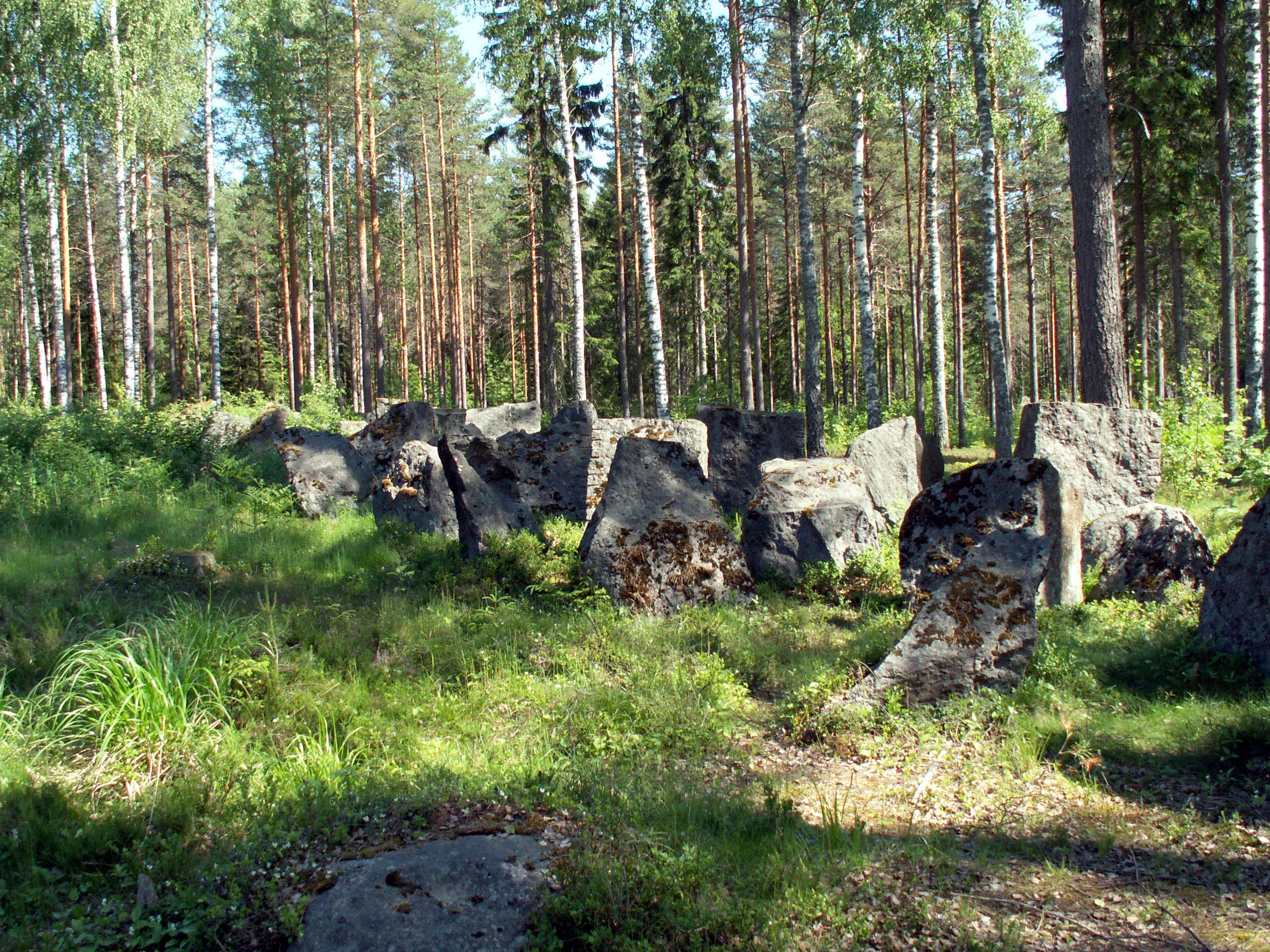
Tank obstacles in Miehikkälä

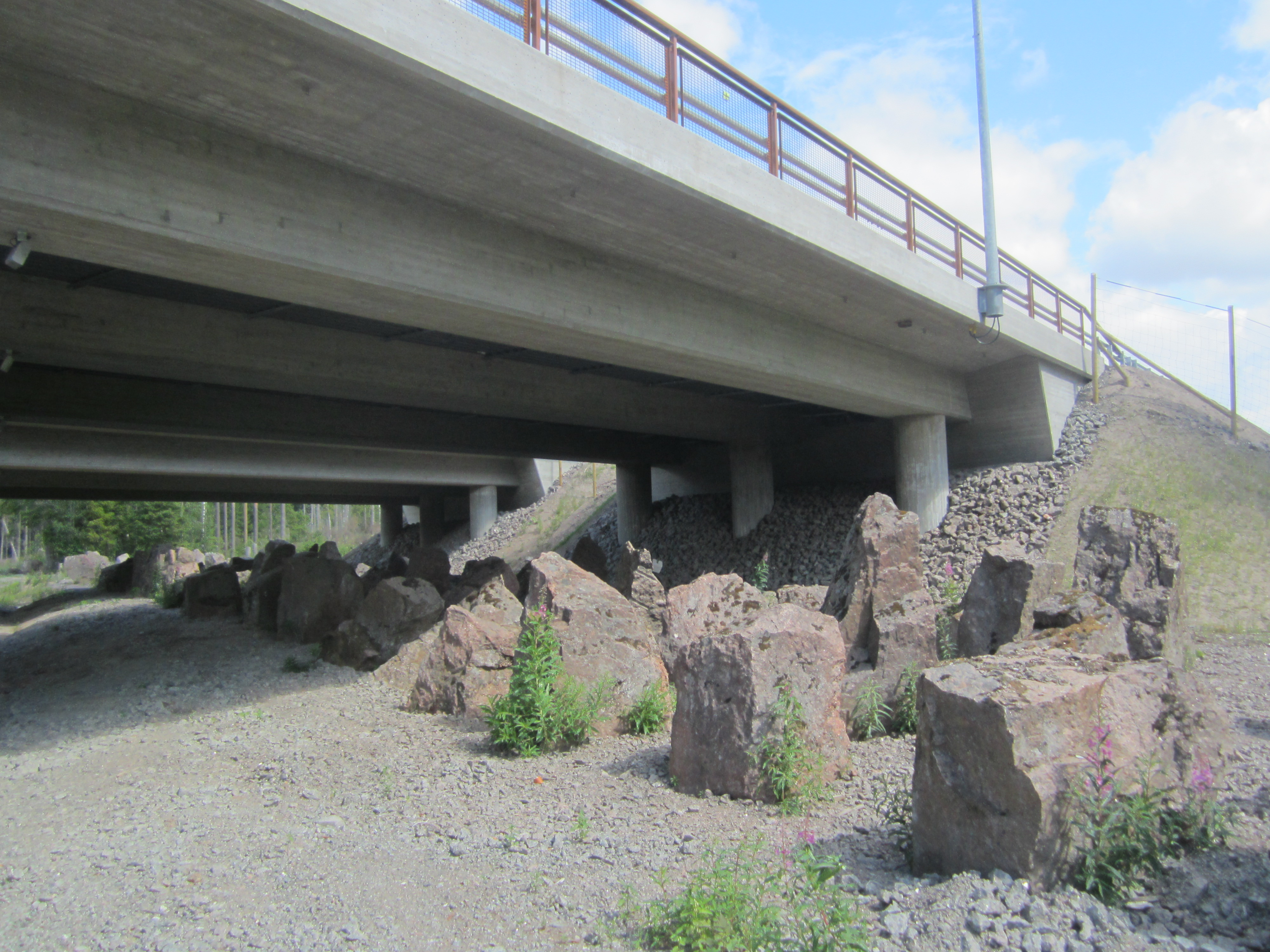
Tank obstacles under national road 7

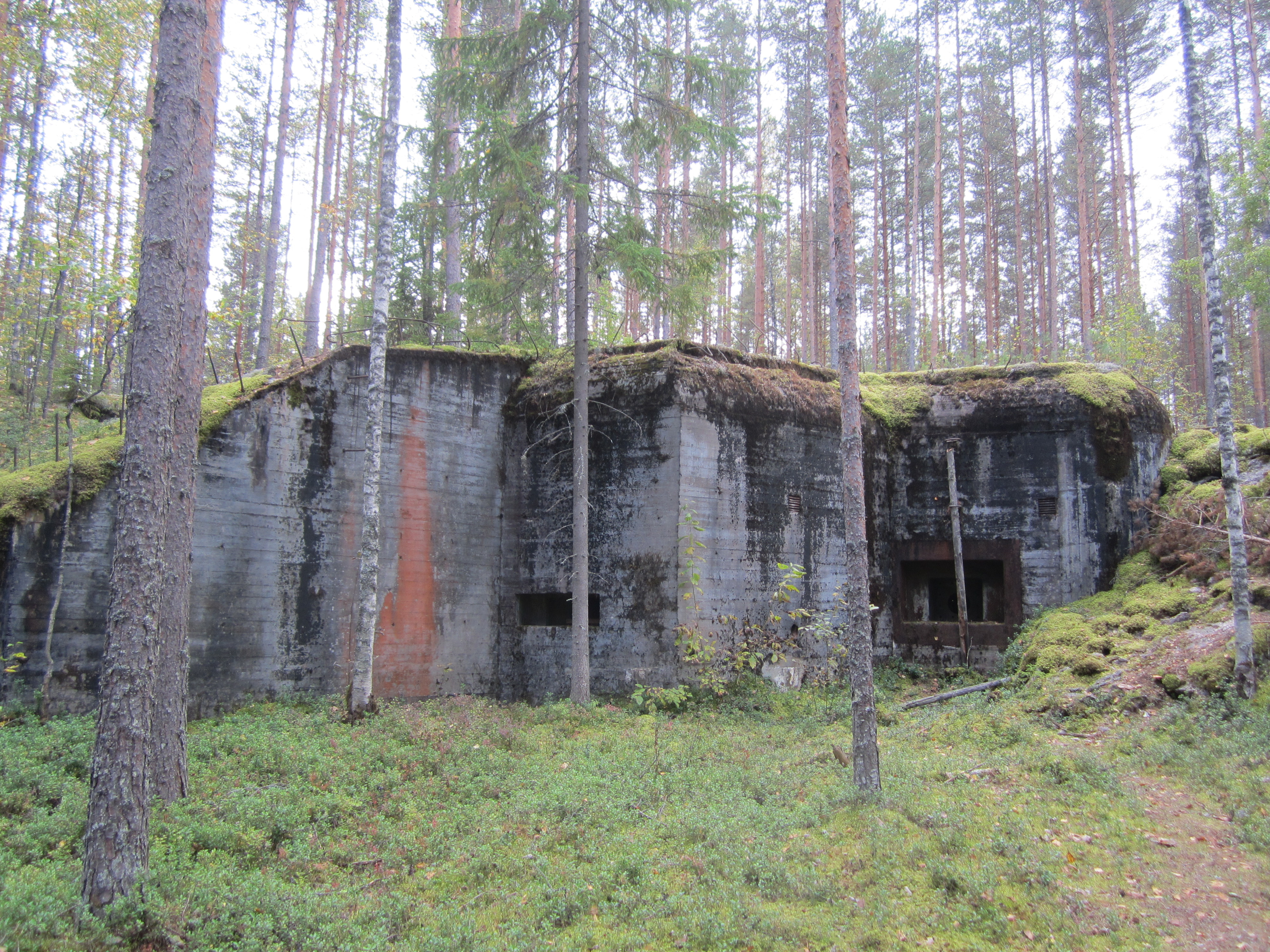
bunker in Virolahti

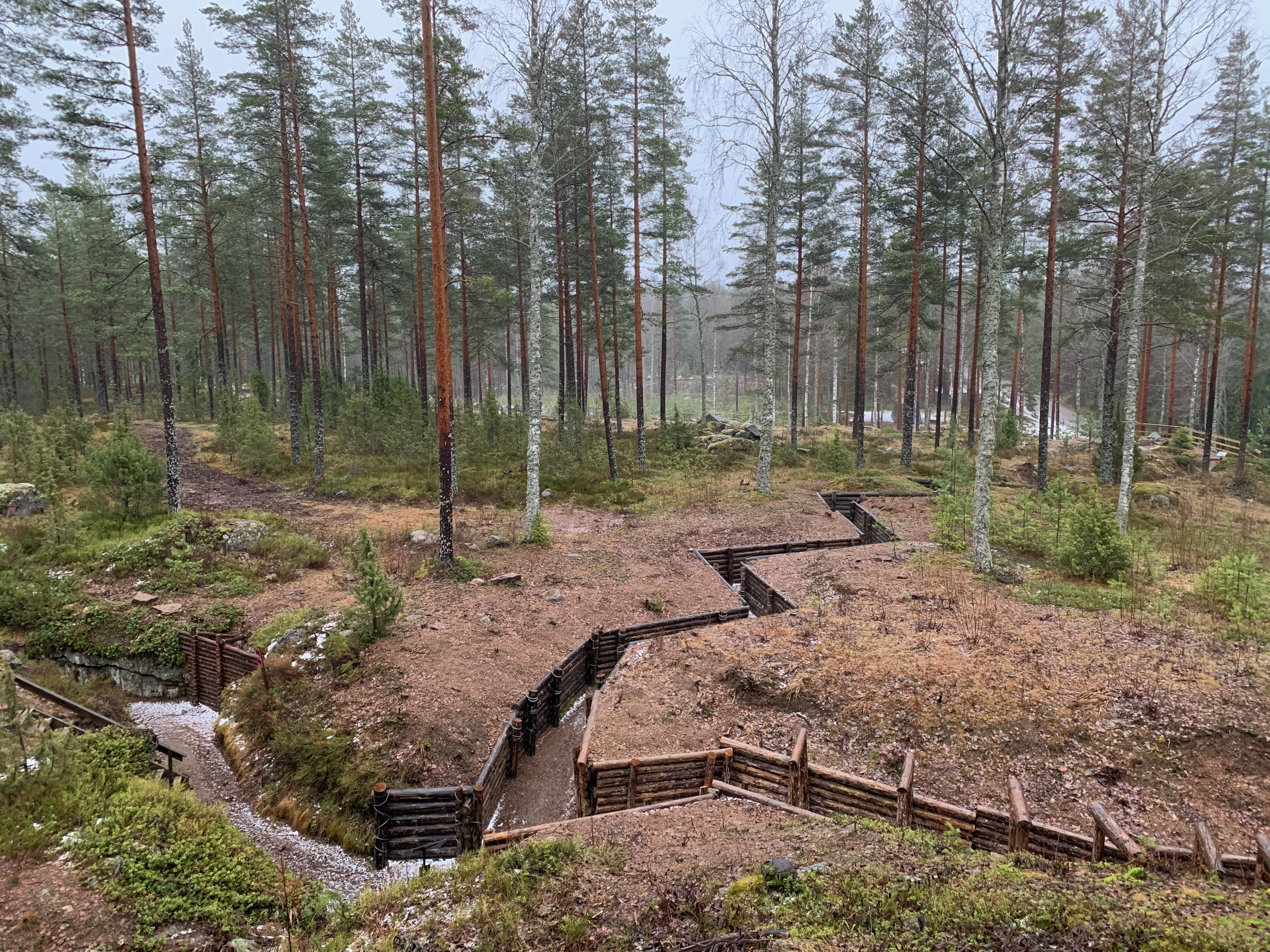
Defensive fighting position in Salpa Line

=== Southern Savonia ===
Municipality	Name	WGS 84	Description
Kerimäki	The Salpa Line in Raikuu		
Puumala	The main village bunker		
Sulkava	Sarsuinmäki area		

=== North Karelia ===
==== History ====
Some of the Salpa Line objects dates back to the Winter War. In Lieksa "Viisikon Salpalinja etusema" was started to be built already during the pre-Winter War extra military training period . The name "Viisikko" refers to the name of the village and can be translated as "The Five". The other names of the village are Hattuvaara (of Lieksa) or just Hattu (a Hat). The battles in Hattu are related to the battles of Lieksa from the very first war day, 30 November 1939 to 27 December 1939. The Soviet forces attacked against the Viisikko positions on 9 December 1939 and it had to start to withdraw on Christmas Day.

The other place where there have been battles during the Winter War was in the Änänkäinen and Puuruu lake areas. On the very first war day, the Soviet troops tried to capture the Kiviranta border control post just after 7 o'clock in the morning, but the prepared and reinforced Finnish border troops succeeded in slowing the speed of the attacking forces and only by the evening the Finnish border troops had withdrawn to Äninkäinen position, where the positions of the 13th separate battalion were. The Finnish counter-attack took place the next day, 1 December 1939. The 13th separate battalion was assisted by the 12th separate battalion, which had come to the place. Both the battalions attacked until the Soviet troops stopped them on the crossroad of Hattuselkonen. Then 12th separate battalion occupied the Änänkäinen position, while the 13th battalion was withdrawing driven by the Soviet troops to the Nurmijärvi of Lieksa. The Laklajoki position was missed almost without a fight. The delay action actually started only 2 December. The Soviet troops started harassing with artillery fire on 3 December and continued to do so for five days. In the first days of December also in Kuhmo the Sivakka road-crossing was lost in Kuhmo, which made it possible for the Soviet troops to go the Nurmijärvi of Lieksa to the back side of the Aninkäinen defenders.

The 13th separate battalion hold the positions and the 12th separate battalion was ordered to withdraw to Puuruu to reinforce the next possible defence position about four kilometres back. The mortars of the 12th battalion were left to reinforce those of the 13th battalion.

In four days, 7 December, the Soviet troops succeeded to take the front positions of the Finnish troops making it hard for the 12th battalion to keep its positions in Änänkäinen region. The same day the Finns destroyed a big Soviet patrol and learned, that the Soviet infantry regiment 529 will cover the southern side of the attacking Soviet division 54, which was to go to Kuhmo. The reinforced 529th regiment consisted of 6,000 soldiers added by 40 cannons and 20 tanks. The idea had been to occupy Lieksa in the independence day of Finland and then go to Nurmes 10 December and then towards Kajaani. The main target was Oulu on the West coast of Finland to cut the country into two halves.

On 8 December 13 separate battalion was allowed to withdraw from Änäkäinen to Nurmijärvi through Puuruu positions. Delaying by almost a week the Soviet troops in front of Änäkäinen provided time for building the new positions in Puuruu.

==== Places ====
Municipality	Name	WGS 84	Description
Ilomantsi			Built-up cultural environments of national importance
Joensuu	Joensuun bunkkerimuseo – The Joensuu Bunker Museum		Stone anti-tank barriers along with two ferroconcrete bunkers
Joensuu, Eno	The defence line of Harpatinvaara "Harpatinvaaran puolustusasema"		Stone anti-tank barriers and partly decayed wooden installations
Lieksa	Anti-tank cliffs, anti-tank gun, "Viisikon Salpalinjan etuasema"		
Lieksa	Änäkäinen-Puuruu battle line Salpa Line objects "Änäkäisen Salpalinjan etuasema", built in 2005 according to the war-time instructions.		
Nurmes	The platoon base "Iloniemi"		
Polvijärvi	The naval gun (Canet 152/45 C) position "Huhmarisvaaran linnoitustykistöasemat"		In Huhmarinen village

==== Other ====
Near Puuruu lake there is a memorial plate attached on the granite stone with the text "TÄÄLLÄ TAISTELTIIN 9–25.12.1939" ("The fights went on here from 9 to 25 December 1939") to commemorate the Lieksa battles.

=== Kainuu and Northern Ostrobothnia ===
Municipality	Place	Name	WGS 84	Description
Kuhmo	Saunajärvi			
Kuusamo	The 5-kilometres long Salpa Line route beginning from Lahtela on the Lämsänkylä road "Lahtela−Vanttajan polku"			
Suomussalmi		Field fortress in "Haukiperän linnoitteet"		Memorial stone for the 14th separate battalltion, which stopped an attack in the Winter War, 7 December 1940 in Jyrkänkoski
Suomussalmi		Field fortress in "Purasjokilinjan kohteet"		

=== Lapland ===
Municipality	Place	Name	WGS 84	Description
Kemijärvi	Joutsijärven teräsbetonikorsut – The Joutsijärvi Concrete Bunkers			
Kuusamo	The 5-kilometres long Salpa Line route beginning from Lahtela on the Lämsänkylä road "Lahtela−Vanttajan polku"			
Salla	The machine gun nest in Ruuhijärvi village "Ruuhijärven konekivääripesäke"			Built-up cultural environments of national importance
Salla	One-kilometre long stone anti-tank barrier in Aholanvaara "Sallan kirkonkylän kohteet"			
Savukoski	The 1.2-kilometres long wooden hiking route "Sarvilammen luontopolku"			Anti-tank barriers and the remains of the nests
Suomussalmi	Field fortress in "Haukiperän linnoitteet"			Memorial stone for the 14th separate battalion, which stopped an attack in the Winter War, 7 December 1940 in Jyrkänkoski
Suomussalmi	Field fortress in "Purasjokilinjan kohteet"			

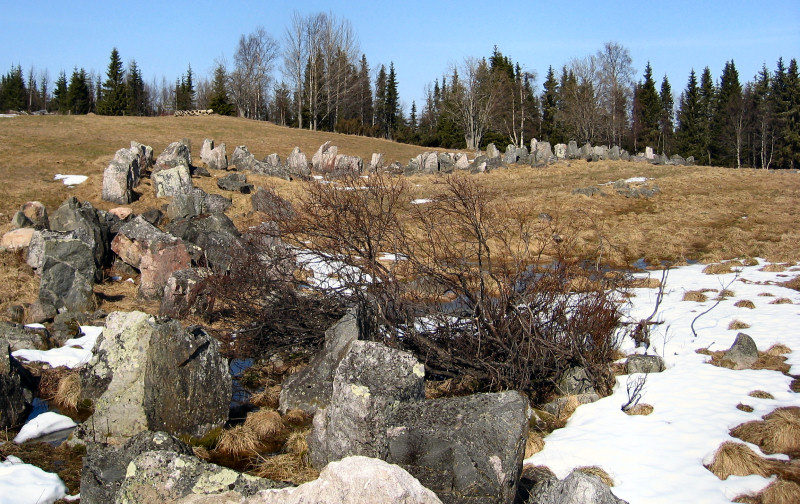
Anti-tank obstacles in the village Aholanvaara, Salla

== See also ==
- VT-line
- VKT-line
- Salpa Line Museum
