= Fire Correction Circle =

Military device

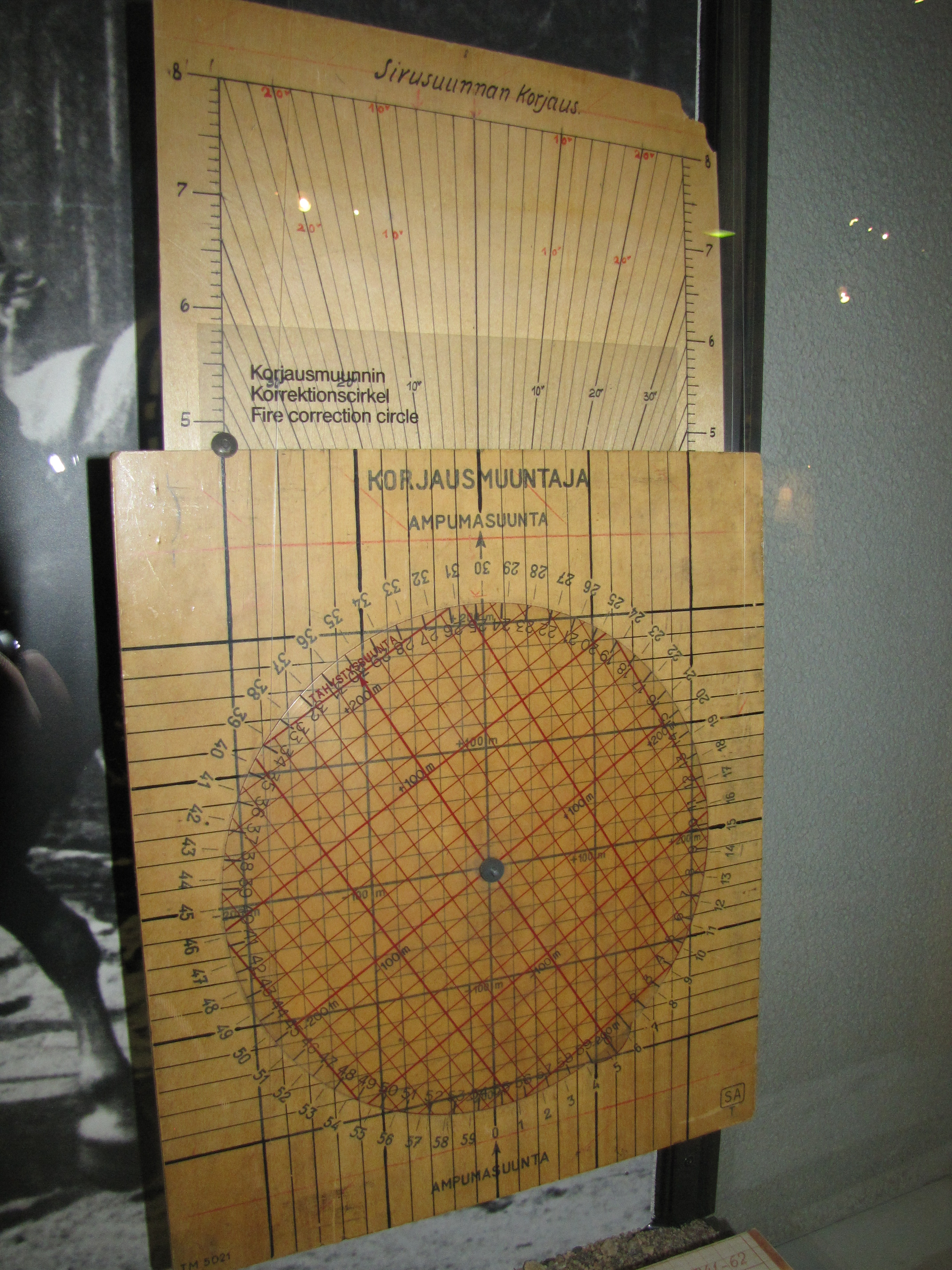
A preserved Fire Correction Circle on display at the Military Museum of Finland in Suomenlinna

In a military context, especially in indirect fire by the Finnish artillery of the Continuation War, the Fire Correction Circle (Finnish: korjausympyrä) or (Fire) Correction Converter Dial (Finnish: korjausmuunnin) is a fully mechanical auxiliary device which was constructed of plywood and transparent plastic and which used to be used to calculate targeting values for indirect fire and mortars. By using a Correction Circle the artillery observer is able to report the necessary fire corrections to the unit firing without knowing exactly where the unit is firing from. This is achieved by having the artillery observer report targets' coordinates (distance and azimuth) from his or her own position to the firing units, then report corrections (both lateral and distance-) in meters after a salvo. Each firing unit would make their own calculations for correction based on their own position, target's position, artillery observer's position as well as lateral- and distance corrections in meters provided by said observer, in theory allowing for an unlimited number of firing units to fire on a single target using the same target coordinates and corrections reported by a single artillery observer. The system can and is also used to quickly switch between targets within the artillery observer's vision by simply reporting sufficiently large corrections.

As an example of this in use, during the Battle of Tali-Ihantala Finnish Army had 21 artillery battalions and one heavy battery, a total of 250 guns and mortars, focusing their fire on targets inside an area of 7 square kilometers, considered to be a world record at the time.
