= VT-line =

Finnish defensive line

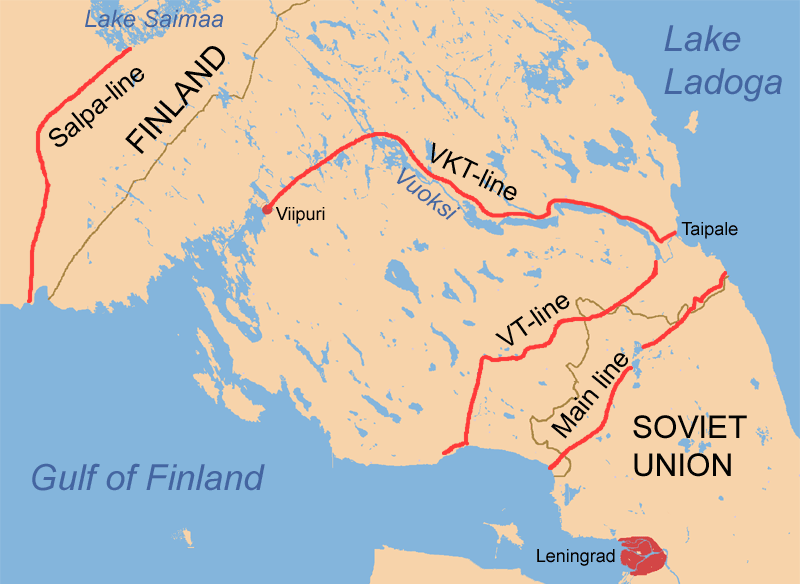
Map showing the four main defence lines built by Finland; Main line, VT-line, VKT-line and the Salpa-line. The Soviet offensive was stopped at the VKT-line.

The Vammelsuu–Taipale line (Finnish: VT-linja; Swedish: VT-linjen; Russian: Карельский вал, romanized: Karelskiy val, lit. 'Karelian Wall') was a Finnish defensive line on the Karelian Isthmus built in 1942–1944 during the Continuation War and running from Vammelsuu on the northern shore of the Gulf of Finland through Kuuterselkä and Kivennapa and along Taipaleenjoki to Taipale on the western shore of Lake Ladoga. It crossed the Saint Petersburg–Vyborg railroad at Sahakylä (now 63rd km) and the Saint Petersburg–Hiitola railroad at Kelliö (now 69th km).

The VT-line was part of four main defence lines constructed by Finland in the aftermath of the Winter War, with the VT-line being the second main line of defence. On June 15, the partially completed VT-line was breached at Kuuterselkä by the Soviet 21st Army as part of the Vyborg–Petrozavodsk Offensive.

== See also ==
- VKT-line
- Karelian Fortified Region
- Salpa Line
