= Einar Vihma =

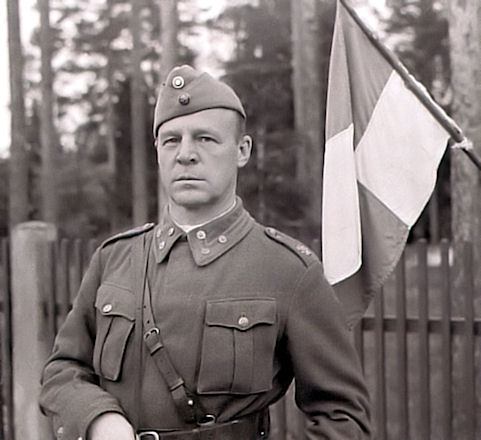
- Born: 19 September 1893; Kuopio, Grand Duchy of Finland
- Died: 5 August 1944 (aged 50); Karelian Isthmus, Karelo-Finnish SSR, Soviet Union
- Cause of death: Killed in action
- Movement: Jäger Movement

Einar August Vihma (until 1936 Wichmann; 19 September 1893 – 5 August 1944) was a Finnish major general. During the Battle of Tali-Ihantala he commanded the 6th Division.

Vihma started his military career in 1915 when he joined the Jäger Movement. In 1917, he came to Finland with the German U-boat SM UC-57 to fight on the side of the Whites during the Finnish Civil War. After the war he was head of the Finnish cadet school between 1933 and 1936 and head of the White Guard between 1936 and 1939. During the Winter War he served as initially as a Brigade commander and later Division commander on the western Karelian Isthmus. He was awarded the Mannerheim Cross in 1941. During the Continuation War he took part in the re-capture of Vyborg and later in the Battle of Tali-Ihantala, where he distinguished himself by managing to halt the Soviet advance in his sector.

In August 1941, troops under Vihma's command massacred 46-57 captured Soviet soldiers. The regimental commander reported the incident to Vihma, who fully approved of the actions of the officer in charge, Captain Niilo Ahonen. After the war, Ahonen was prosecuted for the massacre. During the trial, testimony was presented that Vihma had issued direct orders to execute all enemy officers and political officers. In 1946, the Supreme Court of Finland found Ahonen guilty of 46 counts of manslaughter and sentenced him to one year in prison. Confirming Vihma's involvement, the ruling stated that superior orders had been accepted as a mitigating circumstance.

Vihma himself never stood trial. He was killed during the Battle of Tali–Ihantala in 1944.
