= Lebyazhye, Vyborgsky District, Leningrad Oblast =

Rural locality in Vyborgsky District, Russia

Coordinates: 60°18′38″N 29°32′25″E

Lebyazhye (Russian: Лебя́жье; Finnish: Kuuterselkä) is a rural locality situated on the Karelian Isthmus, in Vyborgsky District of Leningrad Oblast.
