= VKT-line =

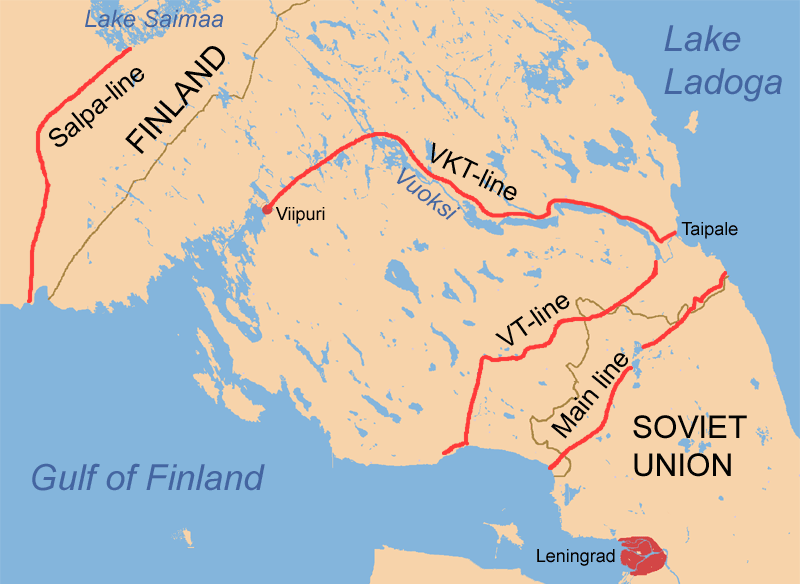

The VKT-line or Viipuri–Kuparsaari–Taipale line (Finnish: VKT-linja, Swedish: VKT-linjen) was a Finnish defensive line.

== See also ==
- VT-line
- Karelian Fortified Region
- Salpa Line
