= 1st Parachute =

1st Parachute may refer to:

== Armies/Corps/Divisions/Brigades ==
- 1st Parachute Army (Wehrmacht)
- 1st Parachute Corps (Germany)
- 1st Parachute Division (Germany)
- 1st Independent Parachute Brigade, Poland
- 1st Parachute Brigade (United Kingdom)

== Regiments ==
- 1st Cambodian Parachute Regiment
- 1st Foreign Parachute Regiment
- 1st Marine Infantry Parachute Regiment, France
- 1st Parachute Chasseur Regiment
- 1st Parachute Hussar Regiment

== Battalions ==
- 1st Battalion, Parachute Regiment, Britain
- 1st Canadian Parachute Battalion
- 1st Foreign Parachute Battalion
- 1st Laotian Parachute Battalion
- 1 Parachute Battalion, South Africa
- 1st Parachute Battalion (Australia)
- 1st Parachute Battalion (Hungary)
- 1st Parachute Battalion, 1st Marine Parachute Regiment, a former U.S. Marine unit
- 1st Paratroopers Battalion (Belgium)
- 1st Royal Carabinieri Paratroopers Battalion, Italy
- 1st Vietnamese Parachute Battalion

== Companies ==
- 1st Foreign Parachute Heavy Mortar Company

== See also ==
- 1st Airborne (disambiguation)
- 1st Army (disambiguation)
- 1st Corps (disambiguation)
- 1st Division (disambiguation)
- 1st Brigade (disambiguation)
- 1st Regiment (disambiguation)
- 1st Battalion (disambiguation)
- 1st (disambiguation)
