= I Corps =

I Corps, 1st Corps, or First Corps may refer to:

== China ==
- 1st Air Defense Force Corps, People's Republic of China
- 1st Mobile Corps, People's Armed Police, People's Republic of China
- 1st Railway Corps, People's Republic of China

== Finland ==
- I Corps (Finland, Continuation War)
- I Corps (Finland, Winter War)

== France ==
- 1st Army Corps (France)
- I Cavalry Corps (Grande Armée), a cavalry unit of the Imperial French Army during the Napoleonic Wars
- I Corps (Grande Armée), a unit of the Imperial French Army during the Napoleonic Wars

== Germany ==
=== German Empire ===
- I Cavalry Corps (German Empire), Imperial German Army
- I Corps (German Empire), Imperial German Army
- I Reserve Corps, German Empire, Imperial German Army
- I Royal Bavarian Corps, Bavarian Army and the Imperial German Army
- I Royal Bavarian Reserve Corps, Bavarian Army and the Imperial German Army

=== Nazi Germany ===
- 1st Air Corps (Germany), Luftwaffe, Wehrmacht
- I Army Corps (Wehrmacht)
- I Cavalry Corps (Wehrmacht)
- 1st Fighter Corps, Luftwaffe, Wehrmacht
- 1st Parachute Corps, Luftwaffe, Wehrmacht
- I Flak Corps, Luftwaffe, Wehrmacht
- I SS Panzer Corps, Waffen-SS

=== Reunified Germany ===
- 1 German-Netherlands Corps

== India ==
- I Corps (British India)
- I Corps (India)

== Ottoman Empire ==
- I Corps (Ottoman Empire)
- I Caucasian Corps

== Poland ==
- 1st Armoured Corps (Poland)
- Polish I Corps (disambiguation), several units

== Romania ==
- 1st Air Corps (Romania)
- 1st Territorial Army Corps

== Russia and Soviet Union ==
=== Russian Empire ===
- 1st Army Corps (Russian Empire)
- 1st Caucasian Cavalry Corps
- 1st Caucasus Army Corps
- 1st Cavalry Corps (Russian Empire)
- 1st Guards Corps (Russian Empire)
- 1st Siberian Army Corps

=== Russian Republic ===
- 1st Ukrainian Corps

=== Russian Civil War ===
- 1st Army Corps (Armed Forces of South Russia)
- 1st Middle Siberian Corps

=== Soviet Union ===
- 1st Airborne Corps (Soviet Union)
- 1st Army Corps (Soviet Union), also known as the 1st Rifle Corps
- 1st Fighter Aviation Corps
- 1st Guards Assault Aviation Corps
- 1st Guards Cavalry Corps
- 1st Guards Mechanized Corps
- 1st Guards Special Rifle Corps
- 1st Mechanized Corps

=== Donetsk People's Republic ===
- 1st Army Corps (Donetsk People's Republic)

== Syria ==
- 1st Corps (Syria)
- First Corps (Syrian rebel group)

== Ukraine ==
- 1st Army Corps (Ukraine)
- 1st Azov Corps, Ukraine
- 1st Donetsk Corps, Ukraine

== United Kingdom ==
- I Corps (United Kingdom)
- I Airborne Corps (United Kingdom)
- I Anti-Aircraft Corps
- 1st (Southern) Buckinghamshire Volunteer Corps

=== Artillery Volunteer Corps ===
- 1st (Peterhead) Aberdeenshire Artillery Volunteer Corps
- 1st (Holyhead) Anglesey Artillery Volunteer Corps
- 1st (Easdale) Argyllshire Artillery Volunteer Corps
- 1st (Irvine) Ayrshire Artillery Volunteer Corps
- 1st (Macduff) Banffshire Artillery Volunteer Corps
- 1st (Wick) Caithness Artillery Volunteer Corps
- 1st (Birkenhead) Cheshire Artillery Volunteer Corps
- 1st Cheshire and Carnarvonshire Artillery Volunteer Corps
- 1st (Padstow) Cornwall Artillery Volunteer Corps
- 1st (Whitehaven) Cumberland Artillery Volunteer Corps
- 1st (United Woodbury and Topsham 'Royal') Devonshire Artillery Volunteer Corps
- 1st (Lyme Regis) Dorsetshire Artillery Volunteer Corps
- 1st (Helensburgh) Dumbartonshire Artillery Volunteer Corps
- 1st (Durham) Durham Artillery Volunteer Corps
- 1st Edinburgh (City) Artillery Volunteer Corps
- 1st (Lossiemouth) Elgin Artillery Volunteer Corps
- 1st (Harwich) Essex Artillery Volunteer Corps
- 1st (Arbroath) Forfarshire Artillery Volunteer Corps
- 1st Forfarshire (Forfar and Kincardine) Artillery Volunteer Corps
- 1st (Bristol) Gloucestershire Artillery Volunteer Corps
- 1st Gloucestershire (Gloucester and Somerset) Artillery Volunteer Corps
- 1st Hampshire (Hants and Dorset) Artillery Volunteer Corps
- 1st Kirkcudbright Artillery Volunteer Corps
- 1st (Stonehaven) Kincardineshire Artillery Volunteer Corps
- 1st London Artillery Volunteer Corps
- 1st (Hanover Square) Middlesex Artillery Volunteer Corps
- 1st Midlothian Artillery Volunteer Corps
- 1st Norfolk Artillery Volunteer Corps
- 1st Northumberland Artillery Volunteer Corps
- 1st (Kirkwall) Orkney Artillery Volunteer Corps
- 1st (Tenby) Pembrokeshire Artillery Volunteer Corps
- 1st (Greenock) Renfrewshire Artillery Volunteer Corps
- 1st (Clevedon) Somerset Artillery Volunteer Corps
- 1st Suffolk Artillery Volunteer Corps
- 1st (Helmsdale) Sutherland Artillery Volunteer Corps
- 1st (Poplar) Tower Hamlets Artillery Volunteer Corps
- 1st (Stranraer) Wigtownshire Artillery Volunteer Corps
- 1st (Leeds) Yorkshire West Riding Artillery Volunteer Corps

=== Engineer Volunteer Corps ===
- 1st City of London Engineer Volunteer Corps
- 1st Cumberland Engineer Volunteer Corps
- 1st Durham Engineer Volunteer Corps
- 1st Essex Engineer Volunteer Corps
- 1st Gloucestershire Engineer Volunteer Corps
- 1st Hampshire Engineer Volunteer Corps
- 1st Newcastle Engineer Volunteer Corps
- 1st Northamptonshire Engineer Volunteer Corps
- 1st Somersetshire Engineer Volunteer Corps
- 1st Sussex Engineer Volunteer Corps
- 1st Tower Hamlets Engineer Volunteer Corps

=== Rifle Volunteer Corps ===
- 1st Anglesey Rifle Volunteer Corps
- 1st (Brecknock) Brecknockshire Rifle Volunteer Corps
- 1st (Carnarvon) Carnarvonshire Rifle Volunteer Corps
- 1st City of Edinburgh Rifle Volunteer Corps
- 1st (Wrexham) Denbighshire Rifle Volunteer Corps
- 1st (Exeter and South Devon) Devonshire Rifle Volunteer Corps
- 1st (Stockton) Durham Rifle Volunteer Corps
- 1st Durham (1st Durham and North Riding of York) Rifle Volunteer Corps
- 1st (Mold) Flintshire Rifle Volunteer Corps
- 1st (City of Bristol) Gloucestershire Rifle Volunteer Corps
- 1st Huntingdonshire Rifle Volunteer Corps
- 1st (Castletown and Foxdale) Isle of Man Rifle Volunteer Corps
- 1st (Ryde) Isle of Wight Rifle Volunteer Corps
- 1st Lancashire Rifle Volunteer Corps
- 1st (Glasgow 1st Western) Lanarkshire Rifle Volunteer Corps
- 1st (1st Leicester Town Rifles) Leicestershire Rifle Volunteer Corps
- 1st (Bala) Merionethshire Rifle Volunteer Corps
- 1st (Victoria and St George's) Middlesex Rifle Volunteer Corps
- 1st (Newtown) Montgomeryshire Rifle Volunteer Corps
- 1st Northamptonshire Rifle Volunteer Corps
- 1st (Tynemouth) Northumberland Rifle Volunteer Corps
- 1st Nottinghamshire (Robin Hood) Volunteer Rifle Corps
- 1st Staffordshire Rifle Volunteer Corps
- 1st Warwickshire (Birmingham) Rifle Volunteer Corps
- 1st (Hull) Yorkshire (East Riding) Rifle Volunteer Corps

== United States ==
- I Corps (United States)
- I Armored Corps (United States)
- I Marine Amphibious Corps
- First Army Corps (Spanish-American War)
- I Field Force, Vietnam, a corps-level unit

=== American Civil War corps ===
- I Corps (Union Army)
- First Corps, Army of Northern Virginia
- First Corps, Army of Tennessee

== Yugoslavia ==
- 1st Aviation Corps, Yugoslavia
- 1st Corps of Air Force and Air Defense, Yugoslavia
- 1st Corps (Yugoslav Partisans), World War II
- 1st Bosnian Corps, Yugoslav Partisans
- 1st Croatian Corps, Yugoslav Partisans

== Other countries ==
- 1st Army Corps (Armenia)
- I ANZAC Corps, Australia and New Zealand
- I Corps (Australia)
- 1st Army Corps (Azerbaijan)
- I Corps (Belgium)
- I Corps (Bosnia and Herzegovina)
- Bulgarian 1st Occupation Corps
- I Canadian Corps
- 1st Croatian Guards Corps, Croatia
- I Corps (Czechoslovakia)
- I Army Corps (Greece)
- I Corps (Hungary)
- 1st Corps (Iraq)
- I Army Corps (Italy)
- I Corps (Netherlands)
- I Corps (North Korea)
- I Corps (Pakistan)
- 1st Krajina Corps, Republika Srpska
- I South African Corps
- I Corps (South Korea)
- I Corps (South Vietnam)
- I Corps (Sri Lanka)
- Field Army Corps 1, Switzerland
- 1st Corps (Vietnam)

== Other uses ==
- First Corps of Cadets, Massachusetts, United States
- First Cadet Corps, Saint Petersburg, Russia

== See also ==
- List of military corps by number
- 1st Army (disambiguation)
- 1st Brigade (disambiguation)
- 1st Division (disambiguation)
- 1st Regiment (disambiguation)
- 1st Wing (disambiguation)
- 1st Squadron (disambiguation)
- 1st (disambiguation)
- I (disambiguation)
