= 1st Brigade Combat Team =

1st Brigade Combat Team or 1 BCT is a modularized brigade of the United States Army.

1st Brigade Combat Team may also refer to:

- 1st Brigade Combat Team, 1st Infantry Division (United States)
- 1st Brigade Combat Team, 1st Armored Division (United States)
- 1st Brigade Combat Team, 1st Cavalry Division (United States)
- 1st Brigade Combat Team, 2nd Infantry Division (United States)
- 1st Brigade Combat Team, 3rd Infantry Division (United States)
- 1st Brigade Combat Team, 4th Infantry Division (United States)
- 1st Brigade Combat Team, 10th Mountain Division (United States)
- 1st Brigade Combat Team, 11th Airborne Division (United States)
- 1st Brigade Combat Team, 82nd Airborne Division
- 1st Brigade Combat Team, 101st Airborne Division (United States)
- 1st Brigade Combat Team (Philippines)

== See also ==
- 1st Division (disambiguation)
- 1st Brigade (disambiguation)
- 1st Regiment (disambiguation)
- 1 Squadron (disambiguation)
