= List of Finnish corps in the Winter War =

This is a list of Finnish corps that existed during the Winter War, 1939–1940.

- I Corps – formed February 19, 1940
- II Corps
- III Corps
- IV Corps
- Swedish Volunteer Corps – Svenska Frivilligkåren, arrived in 1940

== See also ==
- Finnish Army
- List of Finnish corps in the Continuation War
- List of Finnish divisions in the Continuation War
- List of Finnish divisions in the Winter War
