= U-asema =

U-asema, or Pitkäranta–Loimola (U-line) was a defense line during the Continuation War in Ladoga Karelia. The U-station is named after its chief designer and equipment manager, Major Yrjö Urto.

== Fortress ==
Fortification work began in December 1943. When the attack began in the summer of 1944, the line was 55 kilometers long and best equipped in the direction of Uoma and Pitkäranta. The line had 15 ready-made concrete bunkers, 300 meters of armored barriers and five kilometers of battle trenches. Otherwise, the station was mostly unfinished.

== U-station and its operation ==
U-station was an unfinished defensive position with a few strong fire positions, about 25 covered trenches, 12 concrete bunkers, trenches and one barbed wire barrage along the entire length of the station. All tank trenches had strong anti-tank barriers and mines. In Battle of Nietjärvi, the Defensive fighting position of three separate lines, the last one, on a narrow sand ridge, was clearly the strongest.

The position was defended by the 8th Division, 5th Division and 7th Division supported by the 15th Brigade. The Finnish troops occupied U-station for the most part by July 10. According to the retreating forces, 120 Artillery and 40 mortars arrived on the 6th-9th. July. The Battle of Nietjärvi area was occupied by the 5th division's infantry regiment 44 under the command of lieutenant colonel Ilmari Rytkönen and infantry regiment 2 under the command of colonel Heikki Saure.

== The battles ==
The Karelian Front of the Soviet Union attacked the U-station with the forces of four army units in July 1944. The 5th, 8th and 7th divisions of the Finnish army were grouped at the U-station.

The biggest battle for the place took place in Battle of Nietjärvi. The fighting was of the nature of a great battle between the 14th and 15th. since July. The Finns repulsed the attacking Red Army troops. After the Moscow Armistice, the U-station remained on the side of the Soviet Union.
