= 5th Division (Finland, Continuation War) =

- 5. Divisioona
- Active: 1941–1944
- Country: Finland
- Branch: Army
- Type: Division
- Nicknames: Tavastian Division, Lynx Division

Commanders
- Notable commanders: Ruben Lagus (11–25 July 1941)

5th Division (Finnish: 5. Divisioona, also known as Tavastian Division or Lynx Division) was a Finnish Army division in the Continuation War. The division was formed by Etelä-Häme (South Tavastia) military province from the men in Kanta-Häme (Tavastia proper) and Lounais-Häme (South-western Tavastia) civil guard districts.

== History ==
The division was intended to be used as the reserve of the Finnish High Command, but was subordinated to the VI Corps prior to the start of the war. As part of the Army of Karelia, the division advanced towards lake Onega and the river Svir during the 1941 Finnish offensive phase.

At the onset of the Soviet Vyborg–Petrozavodsk offensive, the division was stationed on the river Svir, from where it conducted a fighting retreat during the offensive. As the situation stabilized, the division had established a defensive position in the region of Sortavala.

== Formation ==
After formation the division consisted of the following sub-units:

- Infantry Regiment 2 (JR2)
- Infantry Regiment 23 (JR23)
- Infantry Regiment 44 (JR44)
- Field Artillery Regiment 3 (KTR3)
- Heavy Artillery Battalion 24 (RaskPsto 24)
- Light Detachment 4 (KevOs 4)
- Engineer Battalion 21 (PionP 21)
- Signals Battalion 23 (VP23)

The 5th Division was mostly equipped according to division generic organization, but because of material shortage it lacked the anti-aircraft machine gun company and some material quantities did not reach the intended amounts.

== Commanders ==
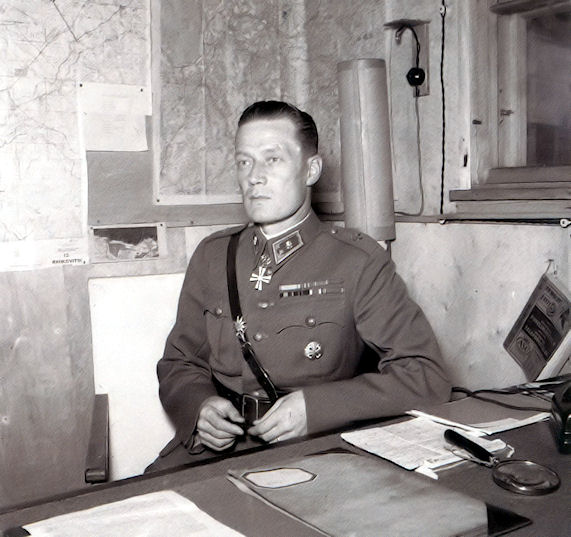
5. Division commander major general K. A. Tapola

- Jäger colonel Eino Koskimies 18 June 1941 – 11 July 1941
- Jäger colonel Ruben Lagus 11 July 1941 – 25 July 1941
- Colonel Ilmari Karhu 25 July 1941 – 16 June 1942
- Major general Kustaa Tapola 16 June 1942 –

== Losses ==
Based on the periodic reports made by units to Finnish General Headquarters the total losses suffered by the 5th Division in killed, wounded and missing during the Continuation War were 10 608 men.

== Sources ==
- Kohvakka, Mikko; Palokangas, Marko (2004). Jatkosodan tiellä. Helsinki: Maanpuolustuskorkeakoulu, Sotahistorian laitos. ISBN 951-25-1522-9.
- Palmunen, Einar (1964). Hämäläisdivisioona jatkosodassa. Karisto.
- Palmunen, Einar (1972). Hämäläisdivisioona etulinjasta kenttäsairaalaan. Karisto.
- Palmunen, Einar (1981). Ilvesdivisioona kuvissa. Karisto.
- Sotatieteen laitos (1988). Jatkosodan historia. Porvoo: Werner Söderström Osakeyhtiö. ISBN 951-0-15326-5.
- Leskinen, Antti; Juutilainen, Jari, eds. (2005). Jatkosodan pikkujättiläinen. Porvoo: Werner Söderström Osakeyhtiö. ISBN 951-0-28690-7.

== See also ==
- List of Finnish divisions in the Winter War
- List of Finnish divisions in the Continuation War
