= 1. Division =

1. Division may refer to:

== Sport ==
- Cypriot First Division, football
- Danish 1st Division, football
- FFHG Division 1, French ice hockey
- Luxembourg 1. Division, football
- 1. divisjon (Norwegian handball), level 2 of Norwegian handball
- Norwegian First Division, football

== Military ==
- 1st Division (disambiguation)
