= 1st Frigate Squadron =

1st Frigate Squadron may refer to:

- 1st Frigate Squadron (Norway)
- 1st Frigate Squadron (United Kingdom)

== See also ==
- Frigate
- 1st Squadron (disambiguation)
