= Krutikov =

Krutikov (Russian: Крутиков), feminine: Krutikova is a Russian surname. Notable people with the surname include:

- Anatoly Krutikov (1933–2019), Russian footballer and manager
- Georgy Krutikov (1899–1958), Russian architect and artist
- Alexey Krutikov (disambiguation), multiple people
- Mikhail Krutikov, Russian sports sailor
- Mikhail Krutikov (philologist), American philologist
