= 1st Panzer Division =

1st Panzer Division may refer to:

- 1st Panzer Division (Wehrmacht)
- 1st Panzer Division (Bundeswehr)
- 1st SS Panzer Division Leibstandarte SS Adolf Hitler
- Fallschirm-Panzer Division 1 Hermann Göring

== See also ==
- 1st Division (disambiguation)
