= 1st Aviation Regiment =

1st Aviation Regiment may refer to:

- 1st Aviation Regiment (Australia)
- 1st Aviation Regiment (United States)
- 1st Transport Aviation Regiment, Yugoslavia
- 1st Training Aviation Regiment, Yugoslavia

== See also ==
- 1st Regiment (disambiguation)
