= 1st Polish Corps =

1st Polish Corps or I Polish Corps or similar may refer to:

- 1st Polish Corps in Russia, 1917–1918, World War I
- I Polish Corps, part of the Polish Blue Army, 1917–1919, World War I
- 1st Polish Corps (Polish Armed Forces in the West), 1940–1947, World War II
- Polish I Corps in the Soviet Union, 1943–1944, World War II; expanded into the Polish First Army on March 16, 1944
- 1st Armoured Corps (Poland), 1944–1945, World War II

== See also ==
- I Corps (disambiguation)
