= First Army =

First Army may refer to:

== China ==
- New 1st Army, Republic of China
- First Field Army, a Chinese Communist Party unit in the Chinese Civil War
- 1st Group Army, People's Republic of China
- First Red Army

== Germany ==
- 1st Army (German Empire), a World War I field Army
- 1st Army (Wehrmacht), a World War II field army
- 1st Panzer Army
- 1st Parachute Army

== Russia and the Soviet Union ==
- 1st Air Army
- First Western Army
- 1st Cavalry Army
- 1st Army (Russian Empire)
- 1st Army (RSFSR)
- 1st Guards Army
- 1st Manchurian Army
- 1st Red Banner Army
- First Russian National Army
- 1st Shock Army
- 1st Guards Tank Army
- 1st Ukrainian Soviet Army
- 1st Fighter Air Defense Army
- 1st Special Purpose Air and Missile Defense Army

== Others ==
- First Allied Airborne Army
- First Australian Army
- 1st Army (Austria-Hungary)
- First Army (United Kingdom)
- First Army (Home Forces), United Kingdom
- First Army (Bulgaria)
- First Canadian Army
- First Czechoslovak Army in Slovakia
- 1st Army (Czechoslovakia)
- 1st Army (France)
- First Army (Greece)
- First Army (Hungary)
- First Indian National Army
- 1st Army (Italy)
- First Army (Japan)
- First Air Army (Japan)
- First Area Army, Japan
- First General Army, Japan
- First Army (Ottoman Empire)
- First Eastern Army (Ottoman Empire)
- First Polish Army (1920)
- First Polish Army (1944–1945)
- First Polish Army (1955–1990)
- First Army (Austro-Prussian War)
- First Army (Romania)
- First Army (Serbia)
- First Army (Syrian rebel group)
- 1st Army Area, Thailand
- First Army (Turkey)
- First Army (United Arab Republic)
- First Army (United States)
- 1st Army (Kingdom of Yugoslavia)
- 1st Army (Yugoslav Partisans)

== See also ==
- List of armies by number
- I Corps (disambiguation)
- 1st Division (disambiguation)
- 1st Brigade (disambiguation)
- 1st Regiment (disambiguation)
- 1st Wing (disambiguation)
- 1st Squadron (disambiguation)
- 1st (disambiguation)
