= 7th Division (Finland, Continuation War) =

- 7. Divisioona
- Active: 1941–1944
- Country: Finland
- Branch: Army
- Type: Division
- Nickname: Sword division
- Engagements: World War II: Continuation War; Finnish invasion of East Karelia; Battle of Nietjärvi; Vyborg–Petrozavodsk offensive

Commanders
- Notable commanders: Antero Svensson

7th Division (Finnish: 7. Divisioona, also known as Sword division) was a Finnish Army division in the Continuation War. The division was formed Savo-Karjala military province from the men in Pohjois-Savo (Northern Savonia) and Pohjois-Karjala (North Karelia) civil guard districts.

== History ==
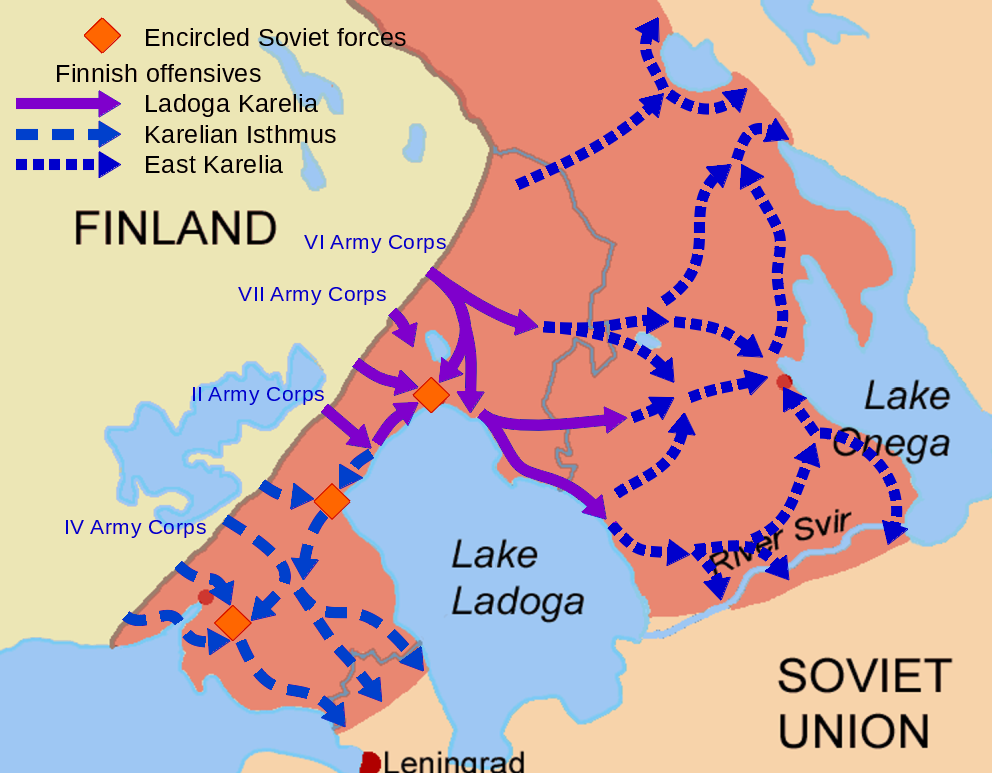
Finnish offensives in 1941, Sortavala is the red square on the north edge of Lake Ladoga. Petrozavodsk is the red circle on the west shore of Lake Onega.

As a component of the VII Corps, the 7th Division took part in the Army of Karelia's 1941 conquest of East Karelia.

At the start of the war the 7th Division was the westernmost division of the VII Corps, the westernmost division of the Army of Karelia, intended to operate between Lake Ladoga and Lake Opega as part of the Finnish invasion of East Karelia. By July 1941 the division was commanded by Colonel Antero Svensson and had advanced to the Matkaselkä Railway and pushed the Soviets back towards Lake Ladoga.

The 7th Division captured Sortavala, a Russian town since 1917 but which had previously been part of Finland, on 8 August 1941 after a fierce battle. The division advanced between Ladoga and Opega, uniting with the 11th Division it attacked east of Kotkozero to capture Lumatjarvi crossroads on 13 September. Continuing to operate with the 11th Division the 7th Division helped to capture Petrozavodsk after penetrating Soviet lines to the south of the city. The 7th Division reached the Svir river by October. The tired division failed to cross the river on 6 October but succeeded the following day.

During the 1944 Soviet advances the 7th Division participated in the defence of Loimola during the July Battle of Nietjärvi.

By 4 September 1944, the division had been subordinated to the II Corps. During the Soviet Svir-Petrozavodsk Offensive of 1944, the division fought a delaying action from the river Svir first to Petrozavodsk and eventually to the Sortavala region.

== Organization ==
After forming the division consisted of the following sub-units:

- Infantry Regiment 9
- Infantry Regiment 30
- Infantry Regiment 51
- Light Detachment 15
- Field Artillery Regiment 2
- Heavy Artillery Battalion 28
- Engineer Battalion 35
- Signals Battalion 26

7th Division was mostly equipped according to division generic organization, only some material quantities were lacking.

== Commanders ==
- Colonel Antero Svensson (18 December 1941 promoted to major general) 17 June 1941 – 1 August 1943
- Colonel William Häkli
- Major general Selim Isakson 28 January 1944 – 15 November 1944

== Losses ==
Based on the periodic reports made by units to Finnish General Headquarters the total losses suffered by the 7th Division in killed, wounded and missing during the Continuation War were 12,384 men, the second-highest losses suffered by the Finnish divisions during the war.

== See also ==
- List of Finnish divisions in the Winter War
- List of Finnish divisions in the Continuation War

== Sources ==
- Sotatieteen laitos (1988). Jatkosodan historia. Porvoo: Werner Söderström Osakeyhtiö. ISBN 951-0-15326-5.
- Leskinen, Antti; Juutilainen, Jari, eds. (2005). Jatkosodan pikkujättiläinen. Porvoo: Werner Söderström Osakeyhtiö. ISBN 951-0-28690-7.
