= Finnish 6th Division =

There have been two Finnish 6th Divisions:

- Finnish 6th Division (Winter War)
- Finnish 6th Division (Continuation War)
