= First Polish Army =

First Polish Army may refer to:

- First Polish Army (1920)
- First Polish Army (1944–1945)
- First Polish Army (1955–1990)

== See also ==
- Polish Army
- First Army (disambiguation)
