= 1st Division (Finland) =

- 1. Divisioona
- Active: 1941–1944
- Country: Finland
- Branch: Army
- Type: Division

Commanders
- Notable commanders: Paavo Paalu

The 1st Division (Finnish: 1. Divisioona) was a unit of the Finnish Army during the Continuation War.

== History ==
The division was initially formed from reservists of the Lounais-Suomi military district and was intended to be used as the reserve of the General Headquarters. Before the onset of the war, one of its component regiments, Infantry Regiment 14, was transferred to the Åland islands under the command of the navy as part of Operation Kilpapurjehdus. The 14th regiment was replaced by Infantry Regiment 60.

During the war, the 1st Division took part in the invasion of East Karelia as a component of the Finnish VII Corps that captured the city of Petrozavodsk. Later in the war, the division was transferred to the II Corps.

== Notable members ==
- Lauri Törni

== See also ==
- List of Finnish divisions in the Continuation War
- Finnish 1st Division (Winter War)
