= Finnish invasion of East Karelia (1941) =

- Part of Continuation War and World War II
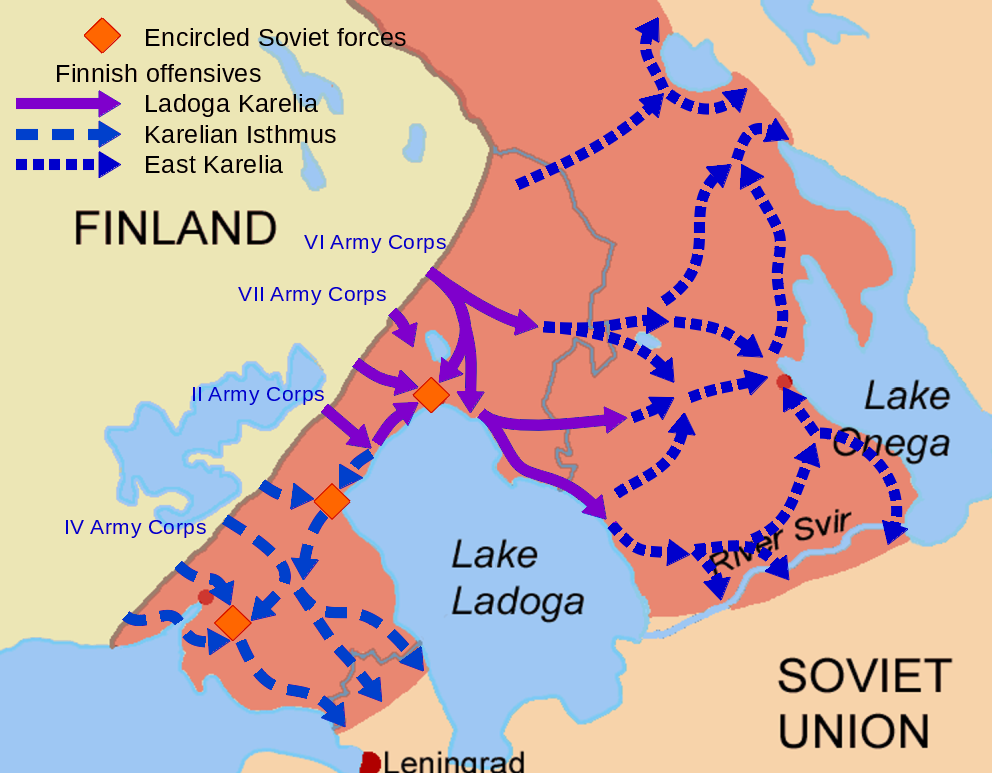
- Map depicting the Finnish offensive operations in Karelia carried out in the Summer and Autumn of 1941 during the Continuation War. The furthest advance of Finnish units in the Continuation War and borders for both before and after the Winter War are shown.
Date	10 July 1941 – 6 December 1941 (4 months, 3 weeks and 5 days)
Location	Eastern Karelia, Lake Ladoga, Lake Onega, Svir River
Result	Finnish victory

Belligerents
Finland; Germany	Soviet Union

Commanders and leaders
(Finland) Erik Heinrichs (Finland) Woldemar Hägglund (Finland) Paavo Talvela (Nazi Germany) Erwin Engelbrecht	(Soviet Union) Markian Popov (Soviet Union) Filipp Gorelenko (Soviet Union) Kirill Meretskov

Units involved
(Finland) Army of Karelia; VII Corps; 7th Division; VI Corps; Group Oinonen^{[note]}; (Nazi Germany) 163rd Division^{[note]}	(Soviet Union) 7th Army

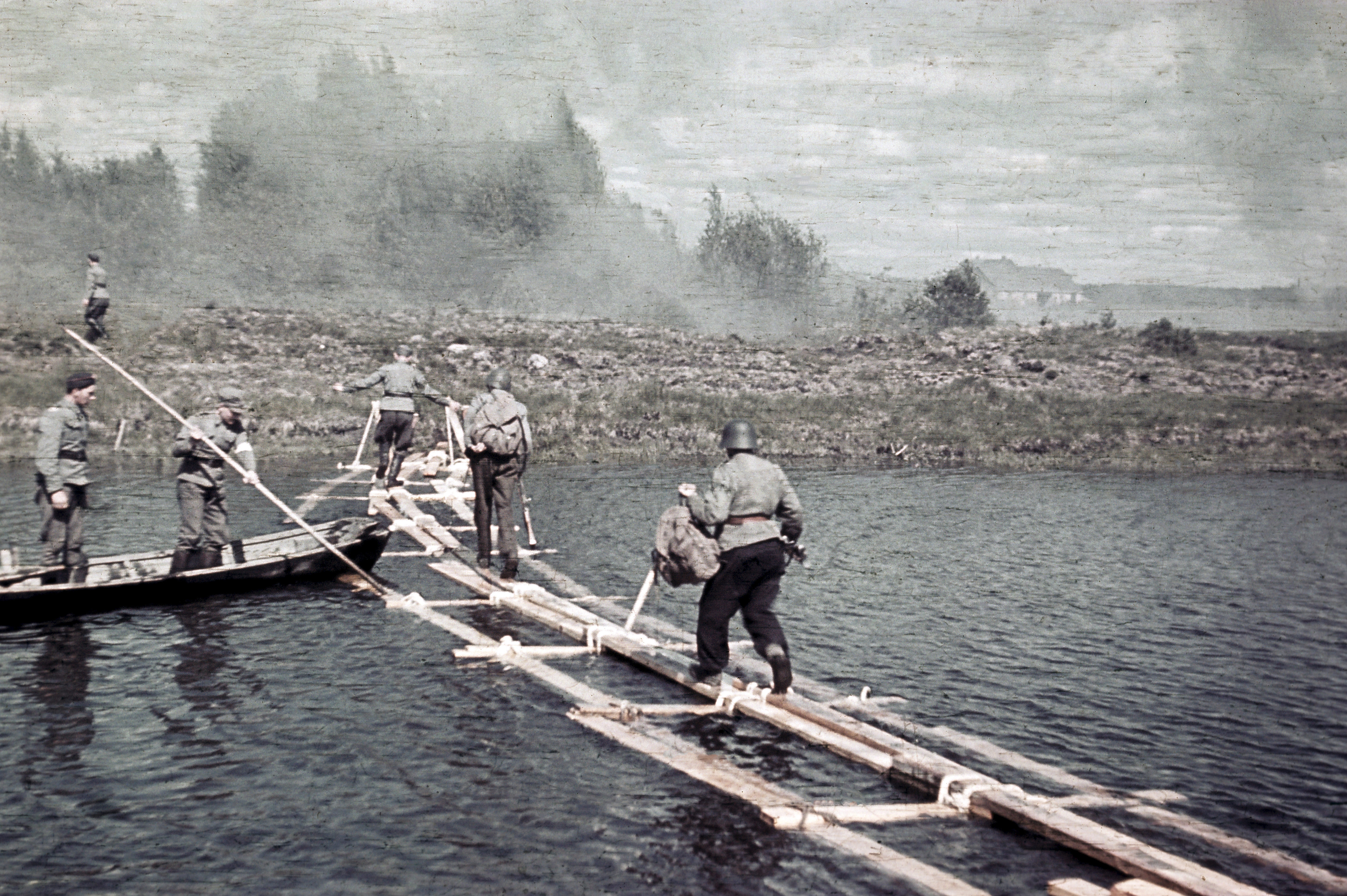
Finnish soldiers in Olonets using an Iivari's quick bridge

The Finnish invasion of East Karelia was a military campaign in 1941. It was part of the Continuation War. Finnish troops occupied East Karelia and held it until 1944. For over a month after the outbreak of the Continuation War, the Karelian Army reinforced and prepared to resume its earlier offensive while waiting for the recapture of the Karelian Isthmus. The Soviets had prepared fortifications and brought troops to the front. When encirclements on the western shore of Lake Ladoga were resolved, the Finnish 7th Division was transferred to the junction of VI and VII Corps.

== Preparations and plans ==
The Finnish 14th Division, commanded by Colonel Erkki Raappana (who in turn operated under the direct command of the Finnish HQ), started its advance on 4 July. It was the northernmost Finnish unit south of the demarcation line between Finnish and German forces. It was opposed by elements of the Soviet 54th Rifle Division. It encircled and mauled the defending Soviet 337th Rifle Regiment at Omelia and kept advancing towards its goal of Rukajärvi and Ontajoki River. The advance was halted by Mannerheim on 17 September 17 after the 14th Division had reached its goals.

While the earlier offensive in Ladoga Karelia by the Finnish VI Corps of the Karelian Army had been successful the same didn't apply to all Finnish attempts. The advance of Group Oinonen had bogged down almost immediately and the VII Corps had been completely occupied in clearing the encircled Soviet forces from the Sortavala area. While the Finnish command had stopped the offensive that did not prevent local commanders from preparing for further attacks. This meant repairing roads and railroad tracks leading to the front lines. The left flank of the Karelian Army also received permission to capture tactical jumping-off positions.

Group Oinonen and the 11th Division of the Finnish VII Corps were ordered to capture the Suvilahti-Suojärvi region. The attack was launched on 19 August and forced the Soviet 71st Rifle Division holding the area to withdraw already on 21 August. The Finns pressed on and captured Tsalkki village and crossroads on 23 August. Increased pressure allowed the Finns to advance and reach the eastern edge of the lake Säämäjärvi on 1 September.

The Finnish plan for the offensive that was to begin on 4 September had the VI Corps advance from its current positions near the lake Ladoga to south-east and reach the Svir River while the VII Corps would first take the important crossroads of Prääsä and then continue to Petrozavodsk. This offensive was believed to be much more difficult than the previous Finnish offensives due to the relatively unfamiliar terrain, wide front of advance and the expectation that Soviet reinforcements would be sent to protect the Murmansk railway.

== Order of battle ==
The Finnish forces consisted of the units of the Karelian Army under Lieutenant General Erik Heinrichs. Furthest to the south was VI Corps under Major General Paavo Talvela who had two divisions (the 5th and 17th Divisions) in front line positions and Group L or Group Lagus (consisting of the 1st Jäger Brigade and certain elements of the 5th Division) under Colonel Ruben Lagus as the mobile reserve. At the center the Finns had VII Corps under Major General Woldemar Hägglund who initially had two divisions (the 1st and 11th Divisions) under his command but was soon reinforced with the 7th Division. Further to the north the Finns had Major General Woldemar Oinonen's Group Oinonen together with the German 163rd Infantry Division under Lieutenant General Erwin Engelbrecht. Furthest to the north was the roughly brigade strong Group K or Group Kuussaari under Lieutenant Colonel Eero Kuussaari.

The Soviet forces consisted of forces of the Soviet 7th Army under Lieutenant General Filipp Gorelenko which had been split into two operational groups. The Olonets Operational Group was located to the south and the Petrozavodsk Operational Group at the center. The Olonets Operational Group consisted of the recently formed Soviet 3rd Militia Division with the 3rd Naval Rifle Brigade held in reserve but was soon reinforced with the 314th Rifle Division. The Petrozavodsk Operational Group consisted of the 272nd Rifle Division with the 313th Rifle Division being held as reserve. The Soviet 71st Rifle Division defended the area further to the north.

== Start of the offensive ==
The Finnish offensive started on the early hours of September 4 at Tuloksa, when the largest artillery barrage so far in Finnish history was unleashed. The Finnish 5th Division quickly broke through the Soviet defenses and crossed the river Tuloksa. Once engineers had hastily built a pontoon bridge the mechanized Group L raced eastwards. The defending Soviet forces consisting of Soviet 3rd Marine Brigade and supporting infantry regiments were forced to either retreat or end up encircled by the advancing Finnish forces. Group L used the mobility it had due to its usage of motor vehicles and captured Olonets already on September 5. Soviet attempts to reform for the defense were hindered by the fact that most of the forces now consisted of broken-up units.

The Finnish 5th and 17th Divisions also started their offensive towards the village of Nurmoila, which was defended by the Soviet 3rd Militia Division. By attacking from both south and north, the Finns forced the defending Soviets to withdraw towards the east despite the field fortifications the Soviets had constructed in the area. The Soviet withdrawal, however, prevented Finns from closing the trap they had prepared for the Soviets, and on September 7, a strong infantry contingent, together with the divisional HQ of the Soviet 3rd Militia Division, managed to escape via forest paths though without any heavy equipment.

The Finnish advance by Group L reached the river Svir by September 7 near the town of Lodeynoye Pole. On the same day, a detachment from the 17th Division cut the Murmansk railroad. The Finns pressed on and captured the railroad bridge over the Svir at Svirstroy on September 13. By September 22, the Finnish VI Corps had already advanced south of the Svir capturing Podporozhye and taken defensive positions. The Finnish bridgehead was at this point approximately 40 km wide and 5–10 km deep. The Finnish 5th Division took positions on the northern shore of the Svir reaching to the mouth of the river while the Finnish 17th Division manned the bridgehead south of the Svir River.

== Capture of Petrozavodsk ==
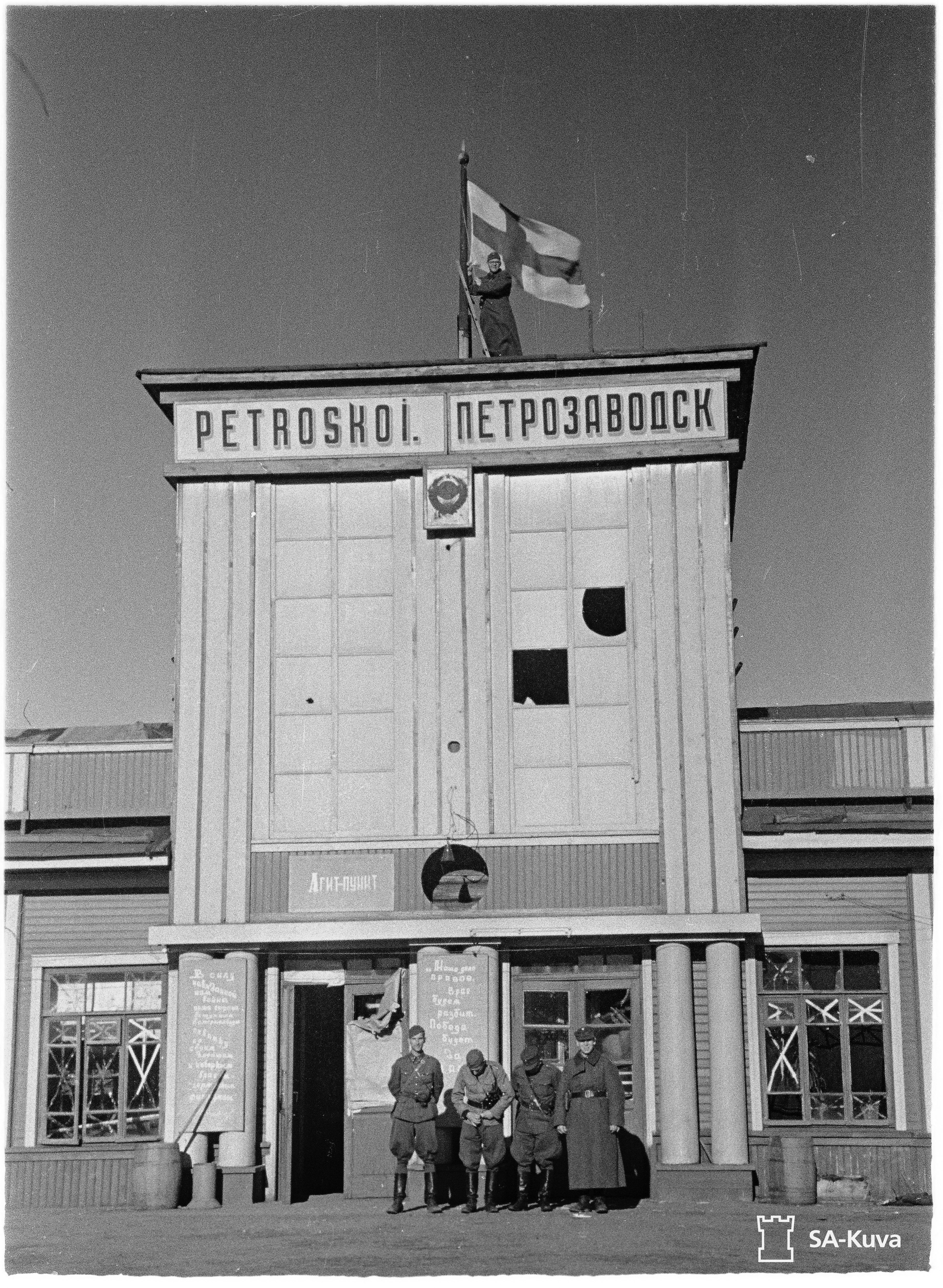
The Finnish flag is raised at Petrozavodsk station (1941)

The Finnish 11th Division's advance towards Pryazha (Prääsä) met strong Soviet resistance but was able to advance through the forests and encircle the defending Soviets. However, the advance was slow, and it took until September 5 before the road leading to Petrozavodsk was cut by the Finnish forces. Encircled Soviet units made repeated counterattacks against the Finnish roadblock but failed to clear it. Steadily advancing, the Finnish 11th Division captured Pryazha on September 8. Meanwhile, the Finnish 1st Division advanced towards the village of Pyhäjärvi directly south of Pryazha. By September 16 the Finnish 1st Division had reached the southern end of Pyhäjärvi while the Finnish 7th Division had looped around the defending Soviet forces. After suffering heavy casualties, the surrounded Soviet forces escaped through the forest after abandoning their heavy equipment. The Finnish 11th Division continued its advance first to Polovina on September 24 and from there to the crossroads at Vilga on September 28, just 6 km from the suburbs of Petrozavodsk.

The Soviets realized early on that holding Petrozavodsk against the Finns advancing towards the town from both west and south was going to be a costly effort. In an attempt to do that, the Soviets formed several new formations from NKVD units, broken-up or separated army units and from reinforcements. These included the 37th Rifle Division as well as the 1st Light Infantry Brigade.

The Finns also brought in reinforcements in the form of the 4th Division that was sent to advance along the road leading from Lake Syamozero towards Petrozavodsk. By September 14, it had already met fierce Soviet resistance, but the numerically superior Finnish forces managed to encircle and defeat the defending Soviet 313th Rifle Division, which was forced to retreat after suffering heavy casualties. However, the clearing of the last of the mottis took until September 26. Elements of the Finnish 4th Division continued their advance with the intent of cutting the road leading north from the Petrozavodsk. The Finns captured the village of Markkila on September 19, but couldn't breach the Soviet 313th Division's defense at Besovets (Viitana) despite repeated attempts. While the Finnish 4th Division was unable to complete its mission of cutting off the Soviet forces defending Petrozavodsk region, it did tie up a considerable amount of Soviet forces and protected the only vulnerable flank of the Finnish advance.

Group L had been advancing north-east from the Svir but the advance was slower than expected due to the heavy autumn rains that turned roads into quagmires. By September, the advance had reached the village of Ladva, where Group L met with the Finnish 7th Division, and together, the Finnish units encircled and then defeated the defending Soviet 3rd Militia Division. Elements of Group L pressed on and reached the shores of Lake Onega on September 23 and cut the route south from Petrozavodsk.

The Finnish advance had pressed the defending Soviets into a small area in the vicinity of Petrozavodsk, with the Soviet 313th Rifle Division keeping the sole remaining land route open. The advance of the Finnish 11th Division reached the town on October 1 but failed to close the escape route until on the following day. Meanwhile, the Finnish 1st Division which had been clearing mottis near Pryazha now reached the front and captured the town later on the same day. The fairly slow Finnish advance had, however, made it possible for several Soviet units to escape from the encirclement. The fall of Petrozavodsk also broke down the resistance in the south from where Group L had been approaching the town. The Finnish 4th Division also finally broke through the Soviet defenses at Besovets, leaving Petrozavodsk firmly in Finnish hands. The town was promptly renamed as 'Äänislinna' ('castle of Onega') by the Finns.

While most of the Finnish forces in the area had been concentrating on the capture of Petrozavodsk, elements of the Finnish 7th Division had advanced along the shoreline of Lake Onega to the mouth of the river Svir. Attempts to cross the river on October 6 failed due to fatigue and the men's refusal to cross the river. A renewed attempt on the following day in bright daylight was successful. The rest of the division followed soon after. This allowed merging of the bridgehead with the one created earlier in the offensive. A Finnish attempt to gain ideal defensive ground came to an end at Oshta when the Finnish troops encountered the fresh Soviet 114th Rifle Division. Neither side could gain advantage in the fighting that followed and the Finnish forces started to prepare for defense in the bridgehead south of the Svir. The Finnish bridgehead south of the Svir was expanded to 100 km in width and 20 km in depth.

== Continued offensive ==
The capture of the town of Medvezhyegorsk (Karhumäki) was set as the goal for the continued Finnish offensive. Troops advancing from various directions towards the town were reformed as II Corps consisting of the Finnish 4th Division, Group O, Brigade (or Group) K and were further reinforced with the 8th Division that was transferred from the Karelian Isthmus. Opposing them was the Soviet operative group consisting of the 37th, 71st and 313th Rifle Divisions which were all under strength. The Finns advanced along two routes: a larger group following the road from Petrozavodsk towards Medvezhyegorsk; and a smaller group following the road from Porosozero (Porajärvi) towards Paatene (at the south-western end of the lake Segozero).

After reaching Paatene, advancing Finnish forces were able to form lines of communication to the Finnish 14th Division that had earlier reached Rugozero. Medvezhyegorsk was captured on December 5 by a three-pronged attack, and on the following day, the Finnish spearhead captured the town of Poventsa (Povenets). After Povenets had fallen to Finnish control, the Red Army destroyed the locks of the Stalin Canal on December 8, which caused immediate flooding of Povenets. Damage from the flood was however largely superficial. Mannerheim had ordered previously that the advance of the Finnish forces would be halted to a line running from Povenets towards Lake Segozero so the capture of Povenets ended the Finnish offensive.

== See also ==
- Finnish military administration in Eastern Karelia

== Notes ==
- ^{a} Independent group consisting of the Finnish Cavalry Brigade and the 2nd Jäger Brigade.
- ^{b} The German 163rd Infantry Division was under the operational command of the Army of Karelia.
