= Alexey Krutikov =

Alexey Krutikov (Russian: Алексей Крутиков), also transliterated Aleksei Krutikov, Aleksey Krutikov, or Alexei Krutikov, may refer to:

- Alexey Dmitriyevich Krutikov (1902–1962), Soviet politician
- Alexey Nikolayevich Krutikov (1895–1949), Soviet general
