= VBF =

United States Navy acronym for Bombing Fighter Squadron military unit

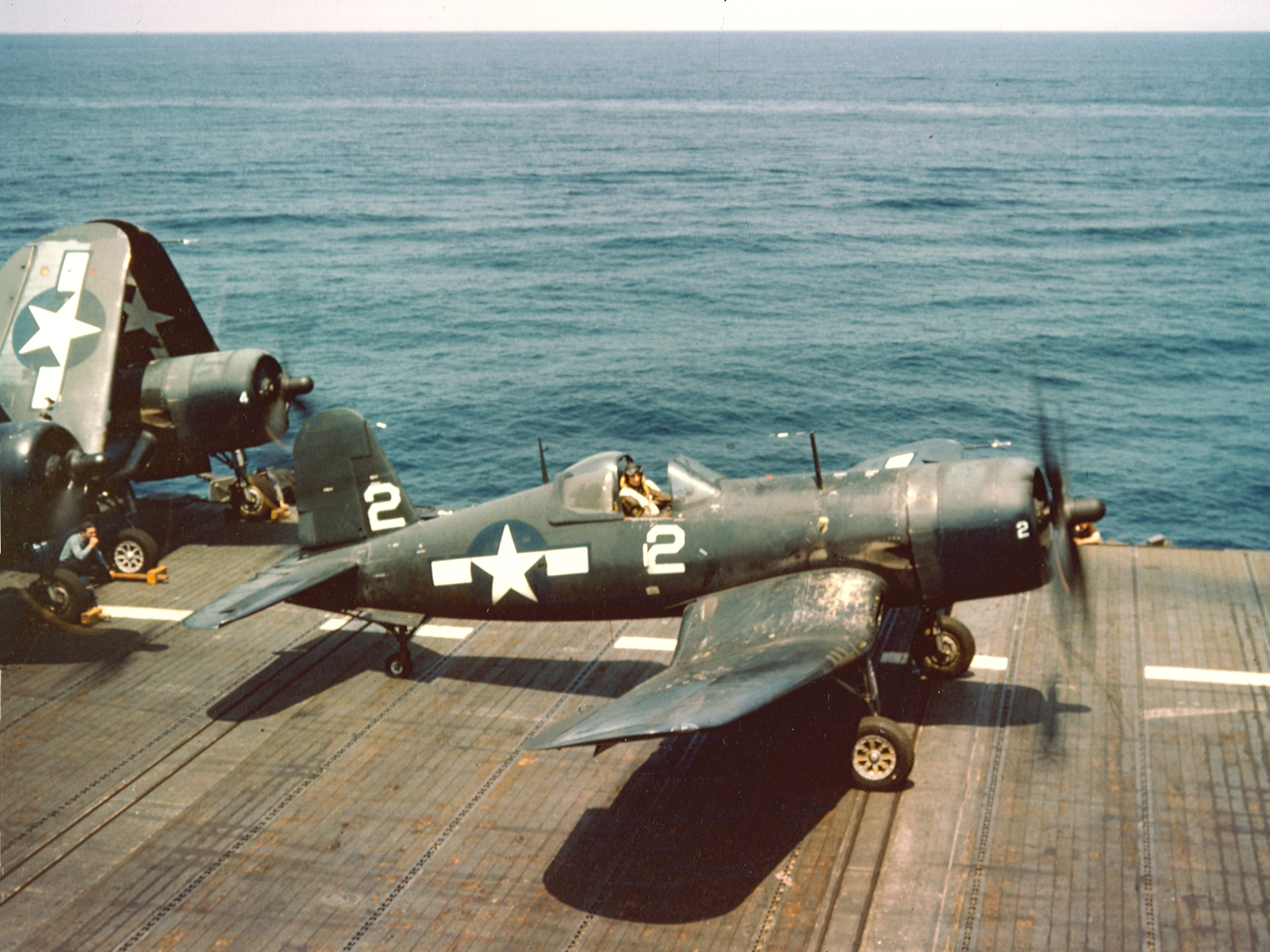
VBF-82 F4U on USS Randolph c.1946

VBF is a United States Navy acronym for Bombing Fighter Squadron. A squadron military unit that used aircraft that could be used both as a fighter aircraft and bomber. During World War II the Vought F4U Corsair was one of the main aircraft used in this role as the Corsair was an excellent fighter aircraft that could carry up to 4,000 pounds (1,800 kg) of bombs. VBF also is sometimes called an Attack Bombing Squadron. Grumman F6F Hellcat could also carry up to 4,000 lb (1,800 kg) of bombs. The Grumman F8F Bearcat carry up to 1,000 lb (454 kg) of bombs.

== VBF units ==
Some US Navy VBF units:

- VBF-1
- VBF-3
- VBF-17
- VBF-19
- VBF-20
- VBF-74A
- VBF-75
- VBF-82
- VBF-153

== See also ==
- List of fighter aircraft
- Warbird
