= 1st Airborne =

1st Airborne or 1st Airmobile may refer to:

- 1st Airborne Division (United Kingdom)
- 1st Airborne Task Force (United States)
- 1st Airmobile Brigade, Germany
- 1st Airmobile Division (Ukraine)
- 1st Airborne Corps (Soviet Union)
- 1st Airborne Brigade (Japan)
- 1st Airborne Brigade (Soviet Union)
- 1st Airborne Brigade, part of the 1st Air Cavalry Division of the U.S. Army during the Vietnam War

== See also ==
- 1st Parachute (disambiguation)
