= List of Finnish divisions in the Continuation War =

This is a list of Finnish divisions that existed during the Continuation War, 1941–1944.

- 1st Division
- 2nd Division
- 3rd Division
- 4th Division
- 5th Division
- 6th Division – formed the 12th Brigade in 1942, reformed as 6th Division in 1943
- 7th Division
- 8th Division
- 10th Division
- 11th Division
- 12th Division – formed 3rd Brigade in 1941
- 14th Division
- 15th Division
- 17th Division
- 18th Division
- 19th Division – disbanded in 1942
- Armoured Division – formed in 1942
- Division J – formed in August 1941, disbanded in August 1942
- 1st Coast Division – a Naval Forces unit, formed in July 1944

== See also ==
- Finnish Army
- List of Finnish corps in the Continuation War
- List of Finnish corps in the Winter War
- List of Finnish divisions in the Winter War
