= 1st Railway Corps =

- Chinese: 铁道兵第1军
- Active: 1956.9-1958 (inactive)
- Country: (China)
- Type: Railway Troops
- Part of: People's Liberation Army Railway Troops

Commanders
- Notable commanders: He Huiyan

1st Railway Corps (Chinese: 铁道兵第1军) of the People's Liberation Army was a military formation mainly focusing on railway construction missions. It was activated on September 1, 1956. The corps commander was Major General He Huiyan. (Note: 何辉燕)

The corps was composed of 2nd, 7th and 11th Railway Divisions.

From 1956 to early 1957, the corps was in charge of the construction of Lanzhou–Xinjiang railway.

In early 1957 the corps diverted to Ningxia and Inner Mongolia to build the Baotou-Lanzhou railway. During the construction, 11th Railway Division was detached from the corps, while 9th Railway Division and Independent Bridge Construction Regiment attached. In July 1958 the construction was finished.

The corps was inactivated before November 1958.
