= VBF-1 =

1944–1945 bombing fighter squadron of the US Navy

The Bombing Fighting Squadron One, designated as Bombing Fighter Squadron VBF-1 and known as "The Royal Flushers", was formed at the Naval Air Station in Fallon, Nevada in December 1944 and commissioned on 2 January 1945, to become the fourth squadron in the Veteran Air Group One. Following Japan's surrender and the end of World War II in the Pacific, VBF-1 was disbanded on 1 November 1945.

== History ==
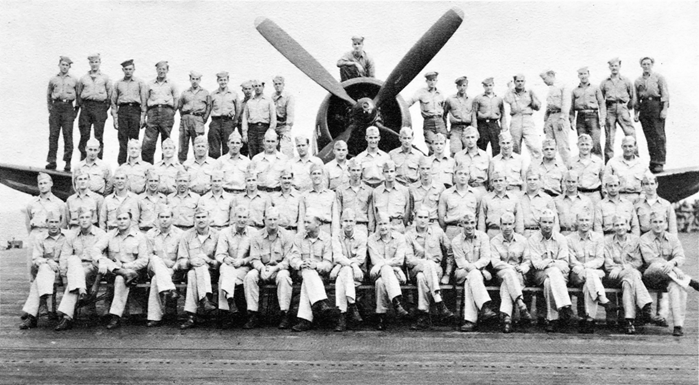
The VBF-1 Squadron

Flying F4U Corsairs, the VBF-1 squadron was assigned to the USS Bennington (CV-20) in the Pacific on 17 June 1945, where it was based for the remainder of World War II. The squadron's pilots participated in strikes against the Imperial Japanese homeland and against her fleet at sea from 10 July 1945 until Japan's surrender on 15 August 1945, including attacks against the Nagato on 18 July 1945, and the battle of Kure from 24 July 1945 through 28 July 1945.
