= Lake Syamozero =

Lake in the Republic of Karelia, Russia

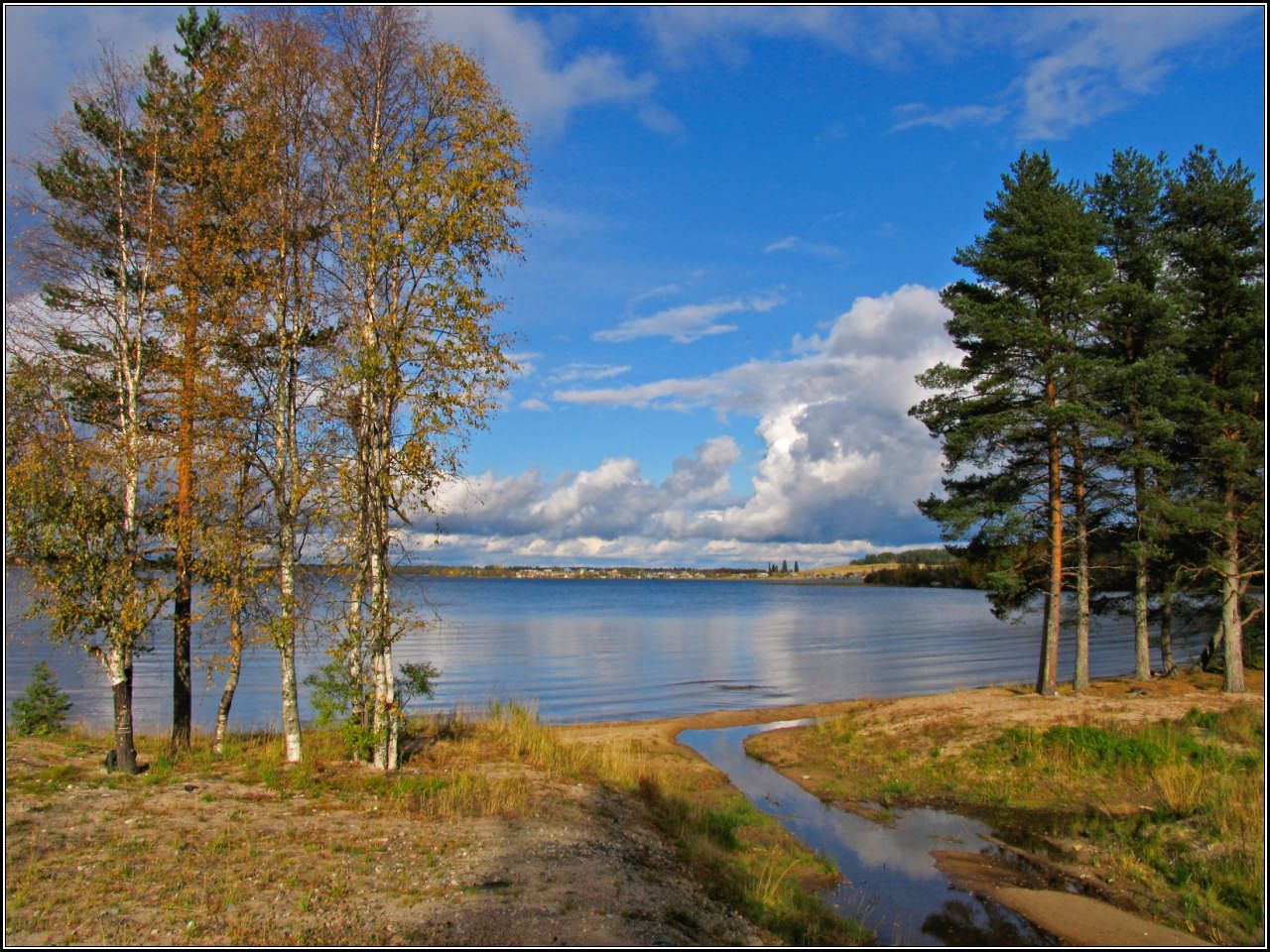

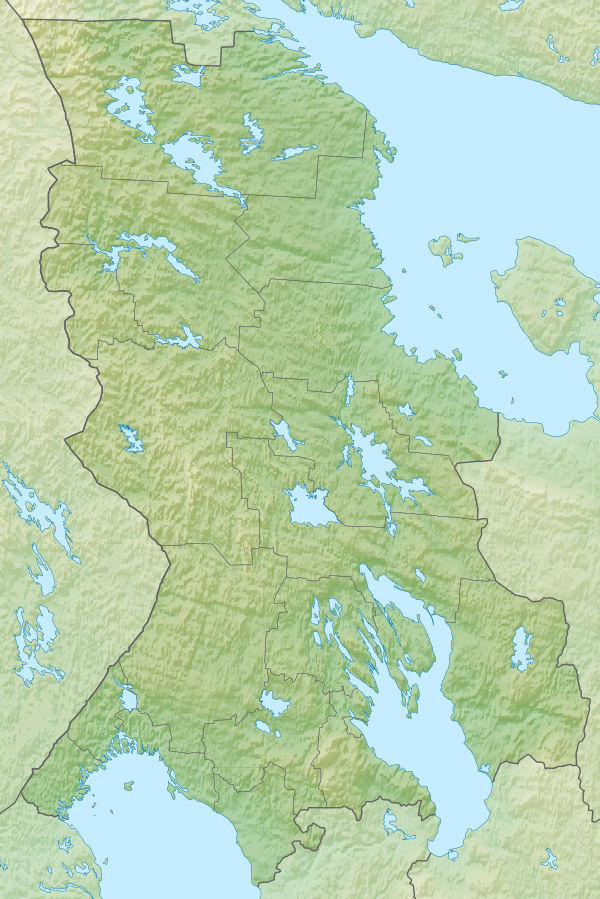
- Location within Russia Location within Karelia
- Location: Republic of Karelia
- Coordinates: 61.9166667°N 33.1666667°E
- Primary outflows: Shuya River, Karelia
- Basin countries: Russia
- Surface area: 265–270 km^{2} (102–104 sq mi)
- Max. depth: 24 m (79 ft)

Lake Syamozero (Russian: Сямозеро, Finnish: Säämäjärvi, Karelian: Seämärvi) is a large freshwater lake in the Republic of Karelia, northwestern part of Russia. It is located west of Petrozavodsk, the capital of the Republic, and has an area between 265 and 270 km^{2}. Maximum depth is about 24 m. There are a few islands on the lake. Syamozero is used for fishery, water transport and timber rafting. The lake is part of the basin of the Shuya River, which flows into Lake Onega.

== 2016 boat disaster ==
In the Syamozero boating accident on 18 June 2016, at least 13 children and one adult instructor died, when a storm caught a tour group on the lake. Aboard were 47 children on a trip from Moscow and four adult instructors. Four people have been arrested on suspicion of safety violations as there had been repeated warnings days prior of an impending storm and advising against boating on the lake.

== See also ==
- List of lakes of Russia
