= II Corps (Finland, Winter War) =

Finnish Army unit

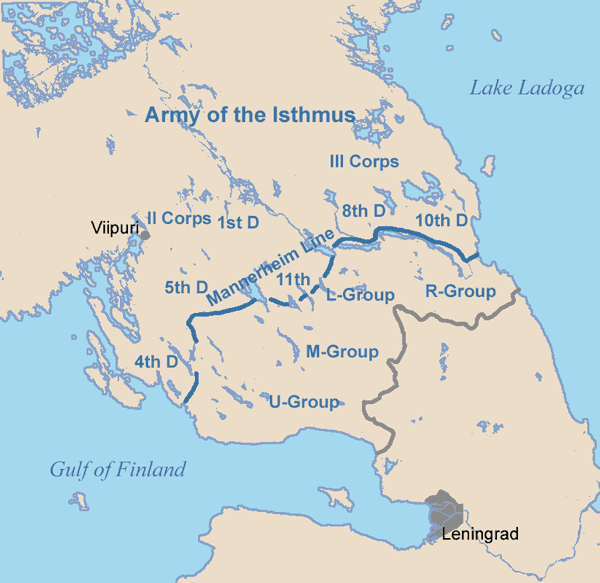

The II Corps (Finnish: II Armeijakunta) was an army corps unit of the Finnish Army during the Winter War.

The II Corps with the III Corps formed the Army of the Isthmus (Kannaksen armeija). The corps was commanded by Lieutenant General Harald Öhquist.

The corps fought in the fierce battles around Summa and in the defence of Viipuri.

== Order of battle ==
=== II Corps ===
- 1st Division
- 4th Division
- 5th Division
- 6th Division - attached on 19 December
- 11th Division
- 23rd Division - arrived in February 1940

=== Delaying groups ===
Delaying groups operational only in the opening phase of the war:

- Group Uusikirkko
  - Cavalry Brigade
  - Jaeger Battalion 1
- Group Muolaa
  - Jaeger Battalion 3
- Group Lipola
  - Jaeger Battalion 2

== Commander ==
- Lieutenant General Harald Öhquist (30.11.1939 - 13.03.1940).
