= 1st Army Corps (Ukraine) =

- 1-й армійський корпус
- Active: 1992–1996
- Country: Ukraine
- Branch: Ukrainian Ground Forces
- Type: Corps
- Garrison/HQ: Chernihiv, Chernihiv Oblast

Commanders
- Current commander: Lieutenant General Viktor Kolotov

The 1st Army Corps (Ukrainian: 1-й армійський корпус, romanized: 1-y armiys'kyi korpus) was one of the first three army corps of the Ukrainian Ground Forces headquartered in Chernihiv, Ukraine. The Corps was established in 1992 after the collapse of the Soviet Union from a redesignation of the former Soviet 1st Guards Army and disbanded in 1996 during Ukrainian Ground Forces reorganization, being replaced Operational Command North (current name since 1998).

== Structure ==
1st Army Corps structure in 1992

- HQ 1st Army Corps
  - 123rd Missile Brigade (Konotop)
  - 108th Anti-Aircraft Missile Brigade (Zolotonosha)
  - 71st Artillery Regiment (Fastiv)
  - 976th Anti-Tank Artillery Regiment (Fastiv)
  - 961st Rocket Artillery Regiment (Fastiv)
  - 30th Independent Mixed Aviation Squadron (Honcharivske)
  - 30th Independent Linear Signal Regiment (Chernihiv)
  - 92nd Independent Radiotechnics Battalion (Chernihiv)
  - 417st Independent Combat Engineer Battalion (Chernihiv)
  - 832nd Independent Surveillance and Reconnaissance Battalion (Chernihiv)
  - 102nd Logistics Brigade (Chernihiv)
  - 6298th Material Maintenance Base (of 41st Guards Tank Division) (Cherkasy)
  - 4214th Material Maintenance Base (of 7th Guards Tank Division and 200th Motorised Rifle Division) (Piryatin)
  - 5193th Material Maintenance Base (of 204th Motorised Rifle Division) (Uman)
  - 5001th Material Maintenance Base (of 47th Motorised Rifle Division and 39th Guards Rifle Division) (Konotop)
  - 25th Mechanized Division (Lubny)
  - 72nd Mechanized Division (Bila Tserkva)
  - 314th Independent Protection and Service Battalion (Chernihiv)
  - 367th Information and Telecommunications Node (Chernihiv)
  - 307th Independent Electronic Warfare Battalion (Chernihiv)
  - 161st Independent Unmanned Aerial Vehicle Reconnaissance Squadron (Honcharivske)
  - 48th Independent Chemical Defence Battalion (Honcharivske)
  - 147th Independent Repair and Restorage Battalion (Honcharivske)
  - 162nd Missile Brigade (Bila Tserkva)
  - 761st Independent Reconnaissance Artillery Regiment (Kremenchuk)
  - 720th River Crossing Battalion (Okhtyrka)
  - 281st Cannon Artillery Brigade (Divychky, Kyiv Oblast)
