= 1st Aviation Regiment (United States) =

- Coat of arms
- Active: 23 Oct 1963 to 15 Apr 1970; 2 Sep 1981 to 15 Sep 1995; 16 Feb 1996 to 15 Jul 2006; 16 Aug 2006 to Present
- Country: United States
- Branch: United States Army Aviation Branch
- Type: Aviation
- Part of: Combat Aviation Brigade, 1st Infantry Division (United States)
- Garrison/HQ: Fort Riley, Kansas
- Nickname(s): "Gunfighters"
- Motto(s): Super Primum (Above the first)
- Engagements: Vietnam; Defense; Counteroffensive; Counteroffensive, Phase II; Counteroffensive, Phase III; Tet Counteroffensive; Counteroffensive, Phase IV; Counteroffensive, Phase V; Counteroffensive, Phase VI; Tet 69/Counteroffensive; Summer-Fall 1969; Winter-Spring 1970; Southwest Asia; Defense of Saudi Arabia; Liberation and Defense of Kuwait; Cease-Fire; War on Terrorism; Iraq; Transition of Iraq; Iraqi Governance; Iraqi Surge; Iraqi Sovereignty; New Dawn

Insignia
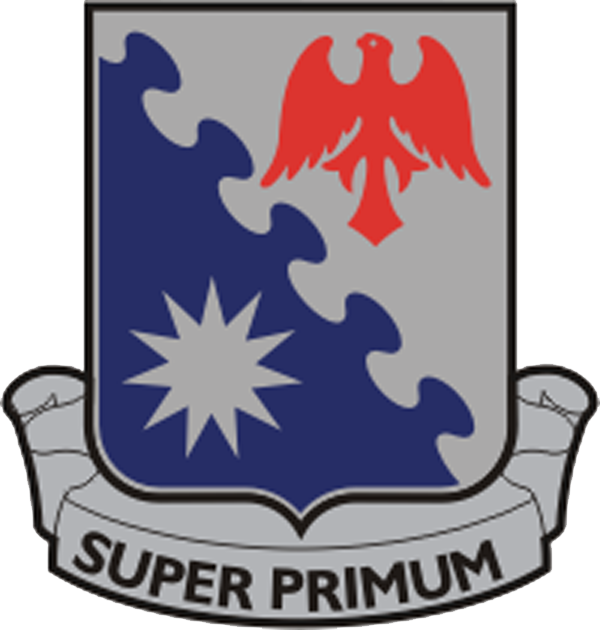
- Distinctive unit insignia

Aircraft flown
- Attack helicopter: AH-64E Apache
- Cargo helicopter: CH-47D Chinook
- Utility helicopter: UH-60L Black Hawk

The 1st Aviation Regiment is a task force and is a unit in the First Infantry Division's Combat Aviation Brigade, composed of three battalion units of pilots, crews, and teams within the United States Army.

== Structure ==
- 1st Battalion (Attack Reconnaissance) "Gunfighters"
  - Headquarters and Headquarters Company (HHC)
    - Iraq 2004-2005 / HQ at FOB Speicher
  - Company A (AH-64) "Rebels"
    - Iraq 2004-2005 / HQ at FOB Speicher
  - Company B (AH-64) "Wolfpack"
    - Iraq 2004-2005 / HQ at FOB Speicher
  - Company C (AH-64) "Ghostriders"
    - Iraq 2004-2005 / HQ at LSA Anaconda
  - Company E
  - Company F (Gray Eagle)
- 2nd Battalion (General Support)
  - Headquarters and Headquarters Company (HHC)
  - Company C (UH-60)
  - Company D
  - Company F
- 3rd Battalion (Assault Helicopter) (Previously 2-6th Cavalry)

== History ==
A U.S. Army Specialist of the 1st Aviation Regiment holding a G36 rifle

=== 1st Battalion ===
The unit was redesignated as Aviation Company, 1st Infantry Division and activated at Fort Riley, Kansas on 21 April 1972. On 2 September 1981 the unit was reorganized and redesignated as 1st Aviation Battalion at Fort Riley, Kansas. On 16 November 1987, the 1st Aviation Regiment was relieved from assignment to the 1st Infantry Division. Its headquarters was concurrently reorganized and redesignated as the 1st Aviation, a parent regiment in the United States Army Regimental System. 2nd Battalion, 1st Aviation Regiment was activated at Katterbach Kaserne, Federal Republic of Germany, under the 1st Armored Division (Old Ironsides)

On 16 November 1987, the unit was reorganized and redesignated as 1st Battalion, 1st Aviation. It remained assigned to the 1st Infantry Division. The 1st Battalion, 1st Aviation was later reorganized and completed its AH-64 Apache unit training plan fielding on 23 April 1990. On 8 November 1990, the 1st Battalion, 1st Aviation, as part of the 1st Infantry Division, was alerted and deployed to Saudi Arabia. On 24 February 1991, the 1st Battalion, 1st Aviation helped the 1st Infantry Division spearhead the VII Corps attack into Iraq. Upon return to Fort Riley, Kansas, the unit continued training until it was inactivated 15 September 1995.

On 16 February 1996, the 1st Battalion, 1st Aviation was reactivated and restationed at Katterbach, Germany, as part of 4th Brigade (Aviation), 1st Infantry Division. On 24 December 1996, the 1st Battalion, 1st Aviation was alerted and deployed to the former Republic of Yugoslavia to conduct operations as part of the North Atlantic Treaty Organization's (NATO) Stabilization Force (SFOR) Operational Reserve. On 31 October 1997, the 1st Battalion, 1st Aviation returned to Katterbach, Germany, where the unit provided invaluable reconnaissance and lethal attack helicopter fires for the soldiers of the Big Red One.

=== 2nd Battalion ===
2nd Battalion was originally Company B, 1st Aviation Battalion.

=== 3rd Battalion ===
3rd Battalion was originally Company C, 1st Aviation Battalion.

3rd Battalion, 1st Aviation Regiment started in Ft. Hood, then deployed to 4th Brigade, 1st Aviation Regiment in Katterbach, Germany with the new AH-64 Apache. 2/1 Avn came after.

The 3rd Battalion lead TF Nightmare for TAAC – South in Afghanistan for 7 months in 2016–2017.

Currently, the regiment may have up to three battalions.

=== G Company 1st Aviation ===
In 1987 G Company 1st Aviation fielded the initial OH-58D equipped platoon in Europe as part of the 4th Brigade, 1st Armored Division. G Company later swapped out the UH-1 Quick-fix with upgraded UH-60 versions. G Company became part of Task Force Phoenix (composed of two J series TOE companies). The other, H Company, was a lift company composed of UH-60s.

== Distinctive unit insignia ==
=== Description ===
A silver color metal and enamel device 1 1/8 inches (2.9 cm) in height overall consisting of a shield blazoned: Per nebuly Argent and Azure (Ultramarine Blue) in base a mullet of 11 points of the first and in chief an alerion Gules. Attached below the shield a silver scroll inscribed "SUPER PRIMUM" in black letters.

=== Symbolism ===
Ultramarine blue is traditionally associated with Aviation units. The alerion (a heraldic eagle without beak or talon) is symbolic of flight and further suggests the fixed-wing variety of aircraft. The star, a symbol of achievement, also represents rotary-winged aircraft. The nebuly partition line is suggestive of clouds and sky.

=== Background ===
The distinctive unit insignia was originally approved for the 1st Aviation Battalion on 17 February 1964. It was rescinded on 8 July 1976. On 1 September 1981, it was reinstated for the 1st Aviation Battalion and amended to change the color of the shield. The insignia was redesignated on 16 November 1987 for the 1st Aviation with the description and symbolism revised.

== Coat of arms ==
=== Blazon ===
==== Shield ====
Per bend nebuly Argent and Azure (Ultramarine blue) in base a mullet of 11 points of the first and in chief an alerion Gules.

==== Crest ====
On a wreath of the colors, Argent and Azure, issuant out of a cloud proper, four crossed lightning bolts their points in base, two at center Gules between Gold.

=== Symbolism ===
==== Shield ====
Ultramarine blue is traditionally associated with Aviation units. The alerion (a heraldic eagle without beak or talon) is symbolic of flight and further suggests the fixed-wing variety of aircraft. The star, a symbol of achievement, also represents rotary-winged aircraft. The nebuly partition line is suggestive of clouds and sky.

==== Crest ====
The lightning bolts issuing from a cloud refers to the mission and capabilities of the 1st Aviation Battalion in combat service. Yellow and scarlet, the colors of the Republic of Vietnam flag, refer to the 1st Aviation Battalion's service in 11 campaigns there. Two awards of the Meritorious Unit Commendation are represented by the scarlet lightning bolts at center, and the two yellow bolts connote awards of the Republic of Vietnam Cross of Gallantry with Palm and Civil Action Honor Medal, First Class.

=== Background ===
The coat of arms was originally approved for the 1st Aviation Battalion on 17 February 1964. It was rescinded on 8 July 1976. On 1 September 1981 the coat of arms was reinstated and amended to change the color of the shield and to add a crest. The coat of arms was redesignated to the 1st Aviation with the symbolism revised on 16 November 1987.
