= 1st Division =

1st Division or First Division may refer to:

== Military ==
=== Airborne divisions ===
- 1st Parachute Division (Germany)
- 1st Airborne Division (United Kingdom)
- 1st Airmobile Division (Ukraine)
- 1st Guards Airborne Division

=== Armoured divisions ===
- 1st Armoured Division (Australia)
- 1st Canadian Armoured Division (subsequently renamed the 5th Canadian Division)
- 1st Armored Division (People's Republic of China)
- 1st Armored Division (France)
- 1st Light Mechanized Division (France)
- 1st Panzer Division (Bundeswehr), (West) Germany
- 1st Panzer Division (Wehrmacht), Nazi Germany
- Fallschirm-Panzer Division 1 Hermann Göring, Nazi Germany
- 1st Armoured Division (India)
- 1st Tank Division (Imperial Japanese Army)
- 1st Armoured Division (Poland)
- 1st Mechanised Division (Poland)
- 1st Mechanized Division (Soviet Union)
- 1st Armoured Division (United Kingdom)
- 1st Armored Division (United States)
- 1st Armoured Division (Syria)
- 1st Tank Division (Soviet Union)
- 1st Armored Brigade (People's Republic of China), formerly the 1st Tank Division, then 1st Armored Division
- 1st Division (Sweden)

=== Artillery divisions ===
- 1st Anti-Aircraft Division (Japan)
- 1st Anti-Aircraft Artillery Division (Soviet Union)
- 1st Anti-Aircraft Division (United Kingdom)
- 1st Flak Division

=== Aviation divisions ===
- 1st Fighter Division (China)

=== Cavalry divisions ===
- 1st Light Cavalry Division (France)
- 1st Foot Cavalry Division (France)
- 1st Cavalry Division (German Empire)
- 1st Cavalry Division (Reichswehr), Weimar Republic, Germany
- 1st Cavalry Division (Wehrmacht), Nazi Germany
- 1st Light Division (Germany)
- 1st Indian Cavalry Division, British Indian Army during World War I
- 1st Cavalry Division "Eugenio di Savoia", Royal Italian Army
- 1st Cavalry Division (Poland)
- 1st Guard Cavalry Division (Russian Empire)
- 1st Cavalry Division (Soviet Union)
- 1st Cavalry Division (United Kingdom)
- 1st Mounted Division (United Kingdom)
- 1st Cavalry Division (United States)

=== Infantry divisions ===
- 1st Guards Infantry Division (Russian Empire)
- 1st Guards Infantry Division (German Empire)
- 1st Division (Australia)
- 1st Infantry Division (Belgium)
- 1st Canadian Division
- 1st Commonwealth Division
- 1st Division (Colombia)
- 1st Division (Estonia)
- 1st Division (Continuation War), Finnish Army
- 1st Colonial Infantry Division (France)
- 1st Free French Division
- 1st Division (German Empire)
- 1st Infantry Division (Wehrmacht), Nazi Germany
- 1st Mountain Division (Wehrmacht), Nazi Germany
- 1st Mountain Division (Bundeswehr), West Germany
- 1st Marine Division (Wehrmacht), Nazi Germany
- 1st Ski Division (Wehrmacht), Nazi Germany
- 1st SS Panzer Division Leibstandarte SS Adolf Hitler, Nazi Germany
- 1st Infantry Division (Azerbaijan, 1918)
- 1st Infantry Division (Greece)
- 1st Kostrad Infantry Division, Indonesia
- 1st Alpine Division "Taurinense", Royal Italian Army
- 1st CC.NN. Division "23 Marzo", Italy
- 1st Infantry Division "Superga", Royal Italian Army
- 1st Division (Imperial Japanese Army)
- 1st Guards Division (Imperial Japanese Army)
- 1st Division (Ireland)
- 1st Division (Japan)
- 1st Division (New Zealand)
- 1st Division (North Korea)
- 1st Infantry Division (Philippines)
- Polish 1st Tadeusz Kościuszko Infantry Division
- 1st Legions Infantry Division (Poland)
- 1st Grenadiers Division (Poland)
- 1st Infantry Division (Romania)
- 1st Infantry Division (South Africa)
- 1st Infantry Division (South Korea)
- 1st Marine Division (South Korea)
- 1st Rifle Division (Soviet Union)
- 1st Caucasian Rifle Division (Soviet Union)
- 1st Division (South Vietnam)
- 1st Division (Spain)
- 1st Asturian Division (Spain)
- 1st Division (Thailand), King's Guard
- 1st Ukrainian Division of the Ukrainian National Army
- 1st Zadneprovsk Ukrainian Soviet Division
- 1st (African) Division, United Kingdom
- 1st (Peshawar) Division, British Indian Army before and during World War I
- 1st (United Kingdom) Division
- 1st London Division, United Kingdom
- 1st Division (Lithuania)
- 1st Infantry Division (United States)
- 1st Marine Division
- 1st Infantry Division (Venezuela)
- 1st Division (Vietnam)

=== Naval divisions ===
- 1st Carrier Division, Imperial Japanese Navy
- 1st Division (Royal Navy), Home Fleet, United Kingdom
- 1st Naval Guard and Patrol Division (Ukraine)
- Carrier Division 1, United States Navy

== Sports ==
=== Association football ===
- Azadegan League, the second-tier professional football league in Iran
- Azerbaijan First League, the second-tier professional football league in Azerbaijan
- Cypriot First Division, the top-flight football division in Cyprus
- Danish 1st Division, the second-tier football league in Denmark
- Football League First Division, the defunct top-flight of the English football league system
- Hong Kong First Division League, the second-highest division in the Hong Kong football league system
- Kategoria e Parë, the second-tier football league in Albania
- League of Ireland First Division, second-level division in Ireland's football league system
- Norwegian First Division, second-level division in Norway's football league system
- Oman First Division League, second-highest Association football league in Oman
- Saudi First Division League, tier of professional football in Saudi Arabia
- Scottish Football League First Division, the second-tier football league in Scotland from 1975 to 2013
- Uzbekistan Pro League, the second-tier football league in Uzbekistan

=== Baseball ===
- First division (baseball), a general term referring to teams in the top half of league standings

== See also ==
- Primera división (disambiguation)
- Division 1 (disambiguation)
- First Army (disambiguation)
- I Corps (disambiguation)
- 1st Brigade (disambiguation)
- 1st Regiment (disambiguation)
- 1st Wing (disambiguation)
- 1 Squadron (disambiguation)
