= List of Finnish divisions in the Winter War =

This is a list of Finnish divisions that existed during the Winter War, 1939–1940.

- 1st Division
- 2nd Division – renamed from 11th Division in 1940
- 3rd Division – renamed from 6th Division in 1940
- 4th Division
- 5th Division
- 6th Division – renamed to 3rd Division in 1940
- 7th Division – renamed from 10th Division in 1940
- 8th Division
- 9th Division
- 10th Division – renamed to 7th Division in 1940
- 11th Division – renamed to 2nd Division in 1940
- 12th Division
- 13th Division
- 21st Division – formed December 19, 1939
- 22nd Division – formed December 19, 1939
- 23rd Division – formed December 19, 1939

== See also ==
- Finnish Army
- List of Finnish corps in the Continuation War
- List of Finnish corps in the Winter War
- List of Finnish divisions in the Continuation War
