= Combat Aviation Brigade, 1st Infantry Division =

Basic aviation formation of the 1st Infantry Division, US Army

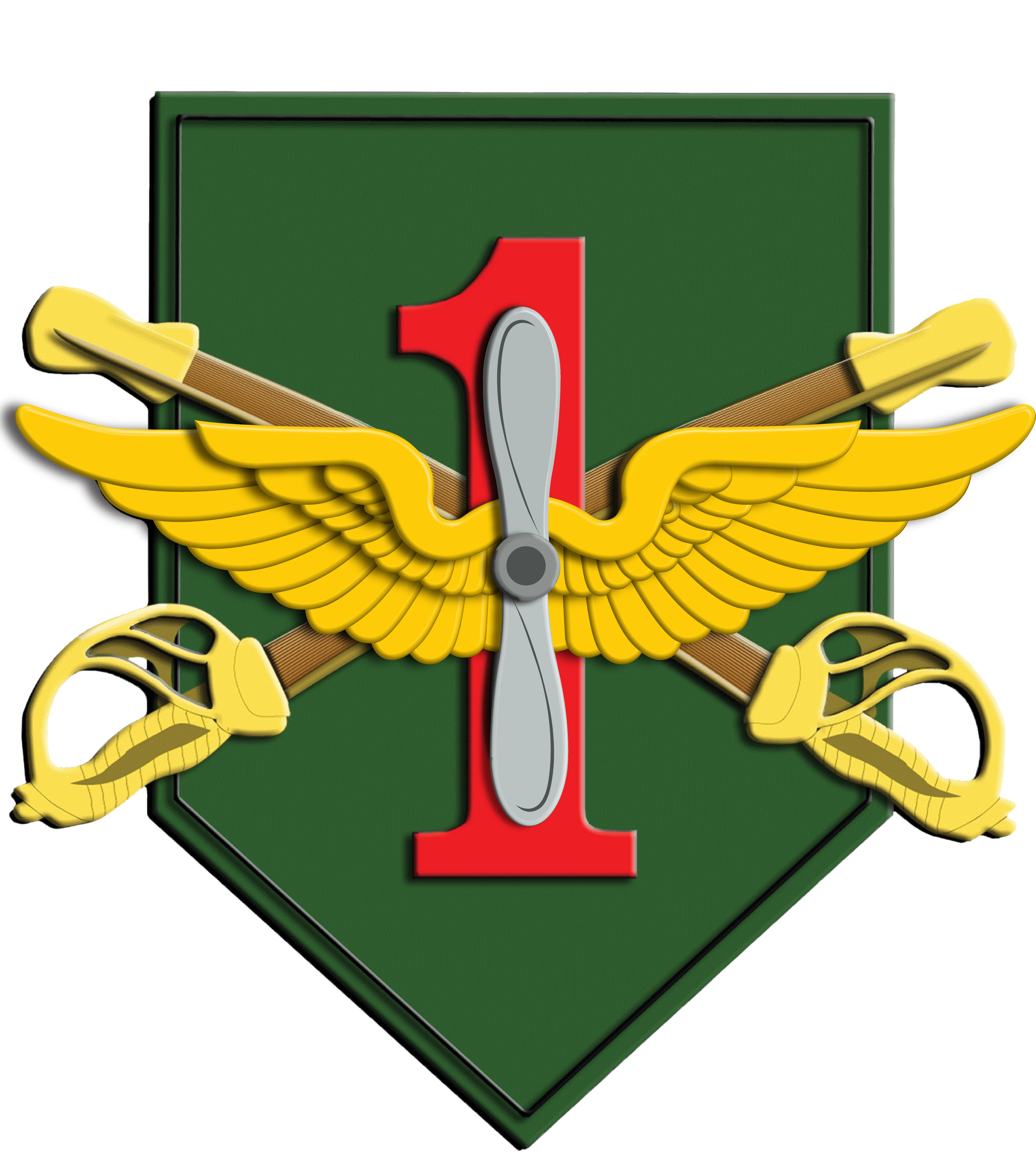
- Active: 1986 – present
- Country: United States
- Allegiance: United States Army
- Type: Aviation
- Size: Brigade
- Part of: 1st Infantry Division
- Garrison/HQ: Fort Riley, Kansas
- Nickname: Demons

The Combat Aviation Brigade, 1st Infantry Division is the Army Aviation formation of the United States Army's 1st Infantry Division. The current commander of this brigade is Colonel Chad P. Corrigan.

== Current structure ==
The current configuration is as follows:

- Headquarters and Headquarters Company (HHC) Archangels
- 1st Battalion (Attack Reconnaissance), 1st Aviation Regiment Gunfighters
- 2d Battalion (General Support), 1st Aviation Regiment Fighting Eagles
  - Company A (VIP Support)(Flying Aces)
  - Company B (Chinook/Heavy Load) (Diesel)
  - Company C (Medical Evacuation)(Boomer)
  - Company D (Maintenance)(Direwolves)
  - Company E (Support and Logistics)(Road Runners)
  - Company F (Air Traffic Control)(Firehawks)
- 3d Battalion (Assault Helicopter), 1st Aviation Regiment Nightmares
  - Company A (Assault), (Black Cats)
  - Company B (Assault), (Black Knights)
  - Company C (Assault), (Black Sheep)
  - Company D (Maintenance), (Black Dragons)
  - Company E (Support and Logistics), (Executioners)
- 1st Squadron (Heavy Attack Reconnaissance), 6th Cavalry Regiment The Fighting Sixth
  - Headquarters Troop (Six Shooters)
  - Troop A (Reconnaissance), (Avengers)
  - Troop B (Reconnaissance), (Bandits)
  - Troop C (Reconnaissance), (Crusaders)
  - Troop D (Maintenance), (Dark Angels)
  - Troop E (Support), (Ironhorse)
- 601st Support Battalion (Aviation) Hellions

== History ==
=== 1980s ===
The Combat Aviation Brigade, 1st Infantry Division, was originally formed from the assets of the Aviation Brigade, 1st Armored Division, which had been created from the assets of 1st Armored Division's 501st Aviation Battalion on 17 April 1986. Colonel James W. Lloyd, the first Aviation Brigade Commander, accepted the unit colors from Major General Dave R. Palmer, Commanding General, 1st Armored Division. (Note: Although often referred to as the "4th Brigade," the United States Army Center of Military History has confirmed that divisional aviation brigades are not numbered. The only exceptions were the 101st and 159th Combat Aviation Brigades in the 101st Airborne Division (Air Assault), which had two aviation brigades. The 159th has since been inactivated and the other brigade was concurrently redesignated as the Combat Aviation Brigade, 101st Airborne Division.)

When formed, the Brigade consisted of the 10th and 501st Aviation Battalions, the 220th Aviation Company (Assault Helicopter), the 244th Aviation Company (Command Aviation) and the 61st Aviation Company (Maintenance). Brigade aircraft included 22 Bell AH-1 Cobras, 38 Bell OH-58 Kiowas and 30 Bell UH-1 Iroquois helicopters.

On 16 November 1987 the 501st and 10th Aviation Battalions were reflagged as the 2d and 3d Battalions, 1st Aviation, a regimental designation. Company A, 501st Aviation Battalion became Companies G and H under the 1st Armored Division and were redesignated again under the 3d Infantry Division as 7th Battalion, 1st Aviation. The 61st Aviation Company (Maintenance) was reflagged as Company I, 1st Aviation.

In May 1988, the 1st Squadron, 1st Cavalry completed the conversion from a purely ground squadron to an air/ground squadron and moved from Schwabach to Katterbach. In late 1998, the 1st Squadron, 1st Cavalry turned in its M60A3s and received 40 M3 Cavalry Fighting Vehicles (CFV).

In July 1989, 2nd Battalion, 1st Aviation inactivated in Germany and the colors reactivated as an AH-64 Apache battalion at Fort Hood, Texas.

=== 1990s ===
The "Strike Eagles" returned to Ansbach Army Heliport on 24 May 1990 becoming the first divisional AH-64 attack helicopter battalion stationed in Germany.

In November 1990, Company I, 1st Aviation was reflagged as the 9th Battalion, 1st Aviation. "Eagle Support" was designed to provide dedicated support to the aviation brigade. The unit later became 603rd Support Battalion (Aviation) under 3d Infantry Division.

In December 1990, COL Daniel J. Petrosky led the brigade to Southwest Asia with the 1st Armored Division and conducted combat operations. For its accomplishments in Operation Desert Storm, the brigade was selected as AAAA unit of the year in 1991.

Shortly after the unit returned and in conjunction with the reorganization of USAREUR, the "Iron Eagle" Brigade joined the 3d Infantry Division. The 1st Squadron, 1st Cavalry was inactivated and turned in its equipment. Its colors were transferred to the divisional cavalry squadron of the 1st Armored Division.

The Aviation Brigade was inactivated in January 1996 at Fort Riley, Kansas, and was reactivated as Aviation Brigade, 1st Infantry Division, in Katterbach, Germany on 15 February 1996, becoming an integral part of the Big Red One. The Aviation Brigade supported numerous contingency operations throughout Europe and Southwest Asia.

=== Operations in Eastern Europe ===
In 1997, the Aviation Brigade deployed to Bosnia and Herzegovina to provide aviation support for Operation Joint Guard (SFOR). In 1999 the Aviation Brigade deployed to Kosovo as a part of the Multi-National Brigade East to provide aviation support to Operation Joint Endeavor. The Aviation Brigade continued operations in Kosovo through July 2003.

=== Operation Iraqi Freedom ===
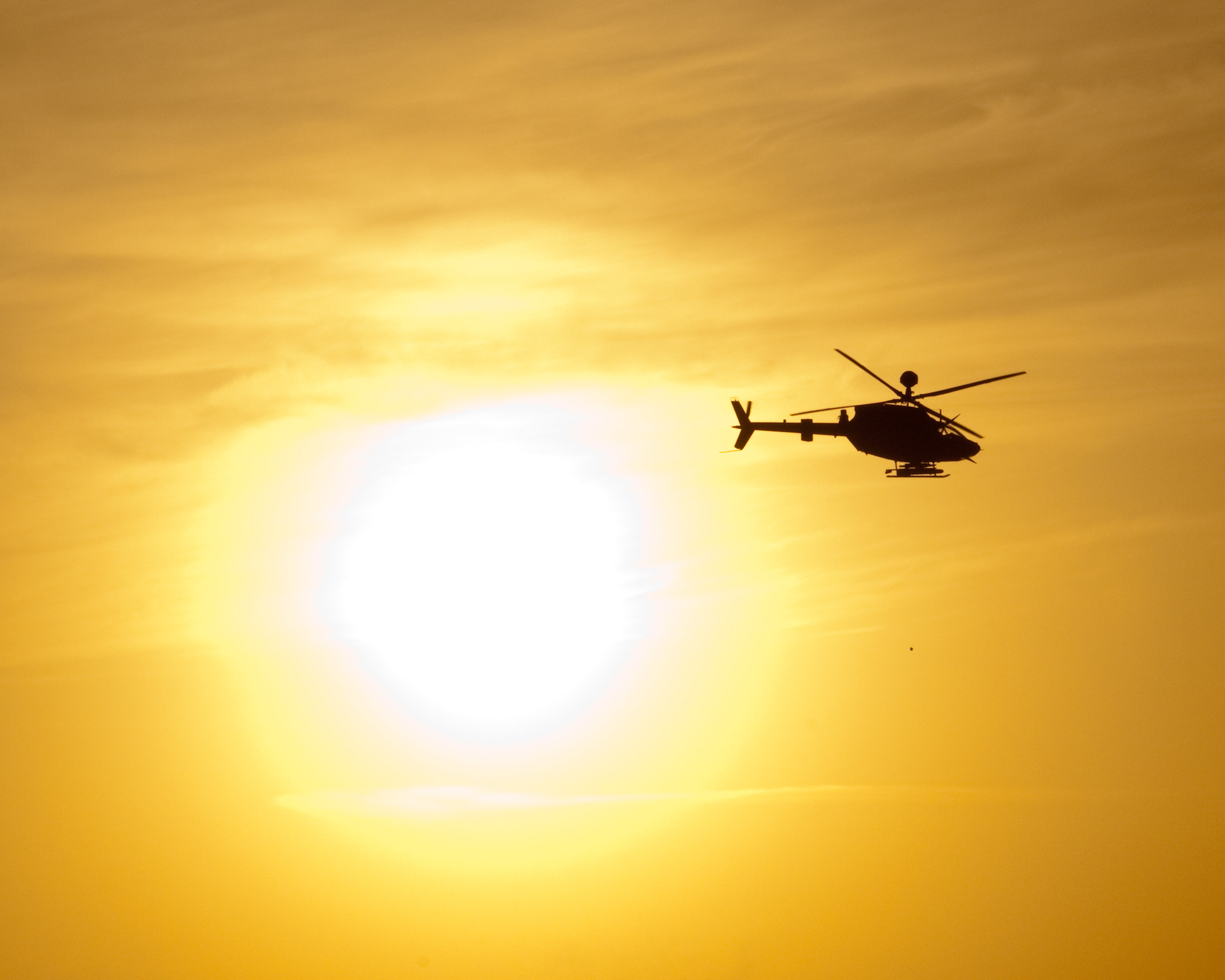
An OH-58D Kiowa Warrior helicopter with Task Force Saber, Combat Aviation Brigade, 1st Infantry Division, flies past the setting sun outside Al Asad Air Base, Iraq, 21 May 2010

In early 2003, the Aviation Brigade prepared for combat operations in support of Operation Iraqi Freedom. Elements of the Aviation Brigade deployed to Turkey to provide general aviation support to AFOR Turkey and the 1st Infantry Division. This support effort was made without aircraft as the battalion was stuck in Kosovo on "unofficial" deployment orders and after three months of trying to get to Iraq through Turkey the Division was turned around and the aviation elements relocated back to Katterbach.

Upon redeployment, the Aviation Brigade welcomed the 6th Squadron, 6th Cavalry Regiment "Six Shooters" to the brigade as part of its aviation transformation and, on 13 June 2005, inactivated the 1st Squadron, 1st Aviation Regiment "Gunfighters," the colors of which departed for the Longbow Unit Fires Training Program (UFTP).

The 1st Infantry Division's Combat Aviation Brigade (The Demon Brigade) completed a fifteen-month deployment to Iraq supporting Operation Iraqi Freedom 07–09. The CAB Hq conducted operations from Forward Operating Base (FOB) Speicher. The Combat Aviation Brigade executed operations from eight dispersed locations and provided attack, reconnaissance, assault, general support aviation, MEDEVAC, Air Traffic Control, and Manned and Unmanned Fixed Wing ISR capability throughout Central and Northern Iraq. During the deployment, the CAB's eight Aviation Battalions flew over a combined total of 230,000 combat flight hours (all platforms) providing Aviation Combat, Combat Support, and Combat Service Support to the 1st Armored Division. The unit's participation was critical during the OIF "Surge". During this time, the Combat Aviation Brigade was led by Colonel Jessie O. Farrington and CSM Darrell "Buddy" Wallace.

In March 2010, the Combat Aviation Brigade deployed to Iraq for a 12-month rotation in support of Operation Iraqi Freedom, as well as to usher in and spearhead Operation New Dawn in September of the same year.

=== Return to Fort Riley ===
Along with its parent 1st Infantry Division, the Combat Aviation Brigade has been reassigned to Fort Riley, Kansas.
