= Alexey Nikolayevich Krutikov =

Soviet military officer (1895–1949)

- Born: 20 July 1895; Kineshma, Kostroma Governorate, Russian Empire (now in Ivanovo Oblast, Russian Federation)
- Died: 23 April 1949 (aged 53); Moscow, Russian SFSR; Soviet Union
- Military career
- Allegiance: Russian Empire (1914-1917); Soviet Russia (1918-1922); Soviet Union (1922-1949)
- Branch: (Russian Empire) Imperial Russian Army; Red Army / Soviet Army
- Service years: 1914 - 1917; 1918 - 1949
- Rank: Lieutenant-general
- Commands: 7th Independent Army / 7th Army (January 1943 - August 1944)
- Conflicts: World War I; Russian Civil War; World War II; Vyborg-Petrozavodsk Offensive; Svir-Petrozavodsk Operation; Battle of Nietjärvi; Petsamo–Kirkenes Offensive; Manchuria Offensive
- Awards: Order of Lenin (2x); Order of the Red Banner (2x); Order of Suvorov, 1st class (2x); Order of the Red Star and other awards

Alexey Nikolayevich Krutikov (Russian: Алексе́й Никола́евич Кру́тиков; 20 July 1895 - 23 April 1949) was a Soviet military leader.

A veteran of the Imperial Russian Army during World War I and the Red Army in the Russian Civil War, Alexey Krutikov graduated from the Frunze Military Academy in 1931 and General Staff Academy in 1938. He was appointed 7th Army chief of staff in November 1940 and served as the commander of the 7th Army between January 1943 and August 1944.

He closely collaborated with Marshal Kirill Meretskov while chief of staff for the Karelian Front (September - November 1944), chief of staff for the Maritime Group of Forces (April - August 1945), and chief of staff for the 1st Far Eastern Front (August - October 1945).

== Biography ==
=== Early career ===
Alexey Nikolayevich Krutikov was born in Kineshma, Kostroma Governorate on 20 July 1895. Conscripted into the Imperial Russian Army at the outbreak of World War I in 1914, he fought at the front as a junior officer (poruchik) after an accelerated junior officers' training course. He joined the newly formed Red Army of Soviet Russia in 1918 and joined the Bolshevik Party in 1919 during the Russian Civil War.

Advancing through the Red Army ranks in the interwar period, he graduated from the Frunze Military Academy in 1931 and the General Staff Academy in 1938. He was promoted to kombrig in 1939 and made a major-general when the traditional general officer ranks were first introduced into the Red Army in June 1940.

Appointed a senior instructor at the General Staff Academy in August 1940, he then took up the position of chief of staff for the 7th Army of the Leningrad Military District in November 1940.

=== World War II ===
Following Finland's entry into war with the Soviet Union on the side of Germany after the launch of Operation Barbarossa in June 1941, the 7th Army temporarily formed part of the Northern and Karelian Fronts until autumn 1941, but remained in eastern Karelia as the 7th Independent Army afterward. Succeeded as its chief of staff by Colonel M. I. Peshekhontsev, Major-General Krutikov was named 7th Independent Army commanding officer in January 1943 and promoted to lieutenant-general in April 1943. The 7th Independent Army rejoined the Karelian Front (now under Army General Meretskov) in the spring of 1944.

In June 1944, the Karelian Front turned to offensive operations. Destruction of enemy forces between Lake Ladoga and Lake Onega fell to Lieutenant-General Krutikov's 7th Army, tasked with attacking in the Olonets-Pitkyaranta-Sortavala direction after forcing the Svir River. One rifle corps with a tank brigade was detached to clear the western shore of Lake Onega with Filip D. Gorelenko 's 32nd Army, which received orders to destroy the concentration of enemy troops around Medvezhyegorsk and cooperate with the 7th Army in liberating the city of Petrozavodsk before moving onward.

Expecting a Soviet offensive, the Finns withdrew from the Svir and their forward positions in the Medvezhyegorsk area, permitting the 7th Army to quickly reach the Svir on the evening of 20 June. The following morning, the 7th Army commenced a full offensive forward and reached the opposite side of the Svir within twenty-four hours, its advance preceded by three-and-a-half hours of artillery bombardment from 1,500 guns and bombing by over 3,000 aircraft from Lieutenant-General Ivan Sokolov's 7th Air Army. Though slowed down as a result of the slow movement of supplies across the Svir, the 7th Army took Olonets and closed in on Pitkyaranta with the support of Naval Infantry from the Lake Ladoga Flotilla within a week. Compelled to withdraw again, the Finns now abandoned Petrozavodsk to the Soviets on 27 June 1944.

Though successful in eliminating the first two of three Finnish defensive lines between Loymola and Koyrinoya in July after being reinforced by a new corps and tank brigade, Krutikov's 7th Army did not manage to break through the final defense at the Battle of Nietjärvi and the front stabilized. Despite this last-ditch success, the Soviet attacks had virtually exhausted the Finnish reserves.

Succeeded as commander of the 7th Army by Lieutenant-General Vladimir Gluzdovsky, Alexey Krutikov replaced Lieutenant-General Boris Pigarevich as chief of staff for the Karelian Front in September - November 1944. Following negotiations in the summer of 1944, the Moscow Armistice ended hostilities between Finland and the Soviet Union in September 1944 and resulted in the Lapland War between Finland and Germany. The following month, Meretskov's Karelian Front launched the Petsamo–Kirkenes Offensive against German forces in northern Finland and northeastern Norway on 7 October 1944, the last major offensive in an Arctic environment. Assisted by Naval Infantry assaults launched by the Northern Fleet, the Front forced German troops in the Finnish north to begin a retreat into Norway on 15 October. Soviet troops freed the Norwegian port of Kirkenes on 25 October, leading the Germans to commence evacuation operations for the German forces in Norway's Varanger Peninsula the day after. The Soviets reached Neiden on 29 October, ultimately stopping at Tanafjord as the Germans retreated further westward to Lakselv.

The Red Army's successful operations in the far north were recognized with Kirill Meretskov's promotion to Marshal of the Soviet Union on 26 October 1944. In spring 1945, Meretskov had Krutikov appointed his chief of staff when made commander of the Maritime Group of Forces along the borders of the Soviet Far East, with Stavka's reorganization of the Soviet forces in preparation for an assault on the Kwantung Army of the Japanese making Meretskov and Krutikov the newly organized 1st Far Eastern Front in August 1945.

==== War with Japan ====
On 9 August, the Soviet Union began the invasion of Japanese Manchuria (Manchukuo) with a three-Front assault on the Kwantung Army. Attacking the heavy concentration of Japanese troops in eastern Manchuria from the region between Vladivostok and Khabarovsk, the 1st Far Eastern Front linked up with Marshal Rodion Malinovsky's Transbaikal Front in the west in a successful entrapment achieved with concealment and surprise while Army General Maxim Purkayev's 2nd Far Eastern Front joined in from the north. Concurrently, elements of the Front's 25th Army fought into Japanese Korea with the support of Naval Infantry deployed by the Pacific Ocean Fleet.

When Hirohito's announced assent to unconditional surrender came on 15 August, most of the Soviets' objectives in Manchuria had been attained. Despite complete encirclement by Soviet forces, Kwantung Army resistance in Manchuria lingered for several more days and was especially stiff at Mudanjiang, a Japanese stronghold blocking the way to Harbin and Jilin. On 15–16 August, some of the most intense fighting in Manchuria took place as the 1st Far Eastern Front's 1st Red Banner and 5th Armies forced the Mudan River and captured Mudanjiang. On 20 August, the last resistance to the Soviet forces ended with recognition of Japan's defeat.

=== Post-war career ===
The 1st Far Eastern Front was disbanded at the end of the war in 1945, with Marshal Meretskov being made commander of the Soviet Far East's Primorsky Military District and Lieutenant-General Krutikov remaining as his chief of staff. He was made deputy chief of the Department of Military Colleges at the Ministry of Defense of the USSR in Moscow in 1946. He died on 23 April 1949.

== Awards ==
- Order of Lenin (twice)
- Order of the Red Banner (twice)
- Order of Suvorov, 1st class (twice)
- Order of the Red Star
  and other awards

== Bibliography ==
- Erickson, John (1999). The Road to Berlin: Stalin's War with Germany, Vol. 2. New Haven, Connecticut: Yale University Press. ISBN 0-300-07813-7.
- Glantz, David M. (2005). Soviet Operational and Tactical Combat in Manchuria, 1945: August Storm. Taylor & Francis e-Library. ISBN 0-203-49625-6.
- Glantz, David M. (2004). The Military Strategy of the Soviet Union: A History. London: Frank Cass. ISBN 0-7146-3435-2.
- Lunde, Henrik O. (2011). Finland's War of Choice: The Troubled German-Finnish Coalition in World War II. Havertown, Pennsylvania: Casemate Publishers. ISBN 978-1-935149-48-4.
