= 6th Division (Finland, Winter War) =

The 6th Division (6.Divisioona) was a unit of the Finnish Army during the Winter War. Finland lost territories in the 3½ month Winter War against the Soviets, November 1939 to March 1940.

== History ==
During the mobilization prior to the Winter War, the 6th Division was placed in the reserve of the Commander-in-Chief Gustaf Mannerheim. The division consisted of reservists mainly from Satakunta. On 19 December it was attached to the II Corps. The 6th and 1st Divisions were to attack the advancing Soviet forces near Summa. The attack began on 23 December but was a failure.

In the beginning of January 1940, the division's name was changed to the 3rd Division. This was done in order to confuse the enemy, but it is uncertain if this had any effect.

In January 1940 the division replaced the 5th Division at the Summa front.

In February the Soviet forces began bombarding the front lines at Summa with artillery fire. On the morning of 11 February, the attack began along the whole front of the exhausted 3rd Division. The Soviets had concentrated nine divisions and five armoured brigades of the 7th Army at Summa. The Finnish lines broke on 13 February and the forces retreated to the Intermediate Line (Väliasema).

== Commanders ==
- Colonel Paavo Paalu

== Organisation in 1939 ==
- Infantry Regiment 16 (JR 16), replaced by JR 22, from January 1940 JR 6
- Infantry Regiment 17 (JR 17), from January 1940 JR 7
- Infantry Regiment 18 (JR 18), from January 1940 JR 8
- Artillery Regiment 6 (KTR 6), from January 1940 KTR 3
- Light Detachment 6 (Kev.Os 6), from January 1940 Kev.Os 3

== See also ==
- Finnish Infantry Division Generic Organisation
