= Battle of Nietjärvi =

1944 Continuation War battle

Coordinates: 61.615°N 31.491°E

- Part of the Continuation War
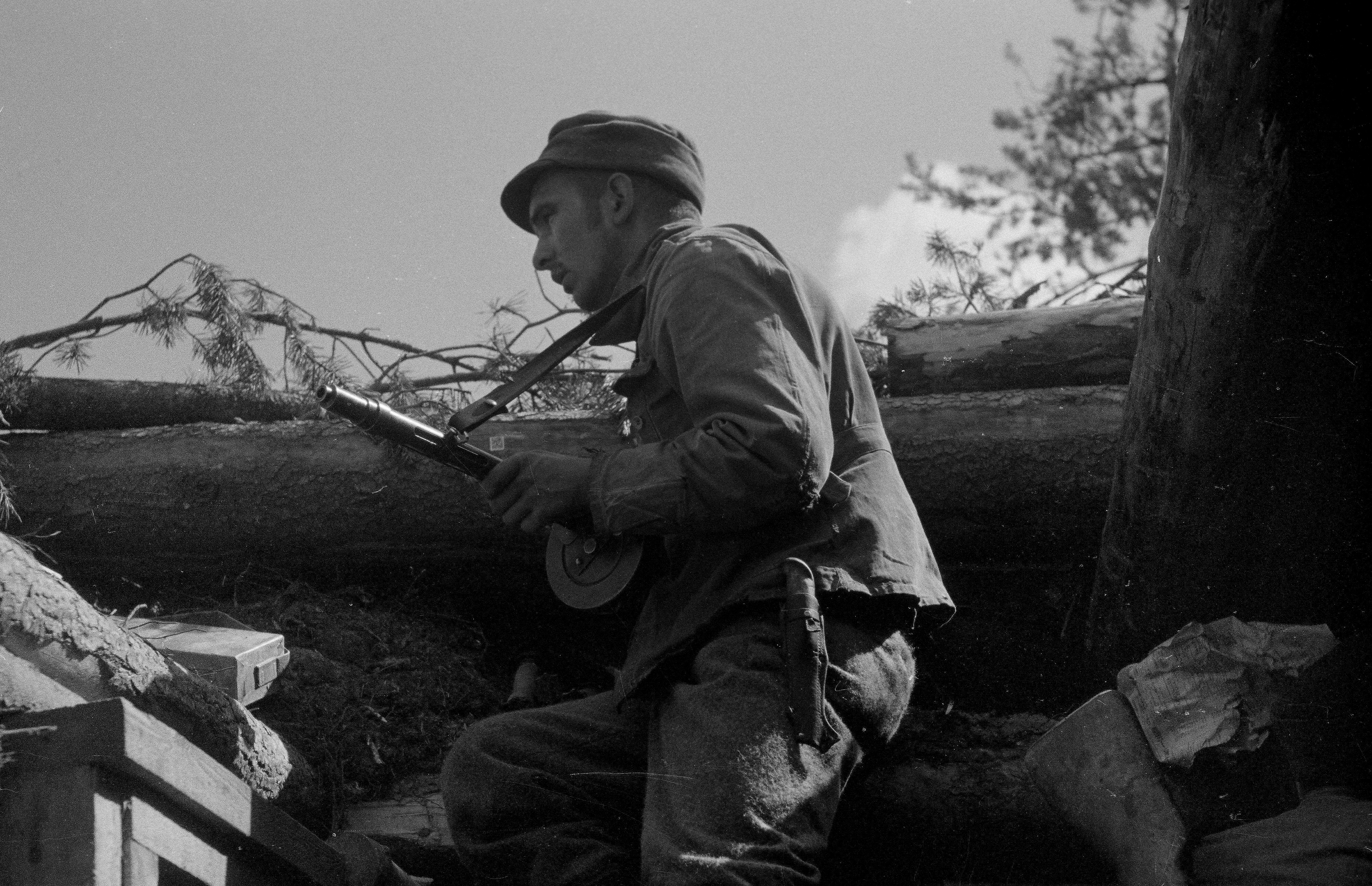
- Finnish soldier in guard duty at Nietjärvi, 19 July 1944
Date	15–17 July 1944
Location	Ladoga Karelia, Finland
Result	Finnish victory

Belligerents
Finland	Soviet Union

Commanders and leaders
Kustaa Tapola	Alexey Krutikov

Strength
5,000; 250 field artillery pieces (20 1/3 battalions, VI Corps)	15,000; 80 tanks

Casualties and losses
500 dead or missing 700 wounded	2,200 dead or missing 4,000 wounded ~40 tanks

The Battle of Nietjärvi (15–17 July 1944) was part of the Continuation War between Finland and the Soviet Union, which occurred during World War II. The battle ended in a Finnish victory.

== Background: U-line prepares to meet a Soviet attack ==
Nietjärvi is a village by Lake Nietjärvi ("järvi" meaning lake). It is located in Ladoga Karelia, north of Lake Ladoga (in the southwestern corner of the Aunus Karelia frontier), in an area which belonged to Finland up to the end of the Continuation War (1944). Here, Finland's Aunus Group was on 11–12 July 1944 ready in positions at the defensive U-line, expecting an enemy offensive. The construction of the U-line had been launched seven months earlier on the level of Nietjärvi–Lemetti–Loimola, as the fortified line behind the PSS-line (Pisi– Saarimäki–Sammatus), which was the most heavily fortified defense line in the Olonets Karelia (north and northeast of Lake Ladoga).

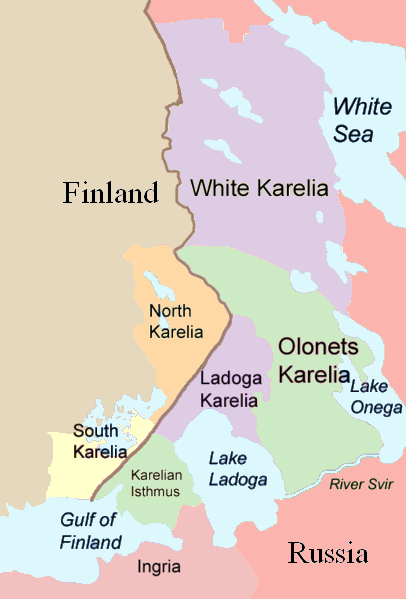
Parts of Karelia, as they are traditionally divided.

Until July 1944, the frontline had closely followed the banks of the River Svir, which flows from Lake Onega to Lake Ladoga. Before the battles began, the Finns abandoned the bridgehead which they had occupied on the southern shore of Svir, when troop transfers to the Karelian Isthmus made it impractical to hold. Behind the frontline there was a secondary defensive line before the strong PSS-line for the Finnish Army to slow down the Soviet advance.

The long-awaited Soviet offensive began with overwhelming force and managed to push through Finnish defenses at the front line. The attack stalled at the PSS-line, but combined efforts from the assaulting troops and naval infantry landing behind the Finnish lines made holding the PSS-line impossible for the Finns, who started withdrawing towards the U-line while delaying the Soviet advance.

During the previous three weeks, the Finnish defenders had managed to delay and disturb the advancement of the enemy offensive, wearing down and eating away the sharpest edge of the Soviet attack. Withdrawing Finns stopped at the U-line, and after finding out the Finnish defenses, the Soviets began to make local probing attacks against the U-line in an attempt to locate possible weak spots suitable for a breakthrough attempt from the Finnish defense line. The decision was made to breach the Finnish defenses along the main coastal road at Nietjärvi and advance to Kittilä. Reaching Kittilä would provide access to the better maintained Finnish road network as well as several roads to Finnish rear areas (Sortavala, Värtsilä and Matkaselkä).

At dawn on 15 July, the formation of the Finnish 5th Division was as follows: the line between Lake Ladoga and Nietjärvi was defended by the 44th Infantry Regiment, commanded by Lieutenant Colonel Ilmari Rytkönen; the 2nd Infantry Regiment defended on the northeastern side of Nietjärvi under the command of Colonel Heikki Saure.

== Combat activities ==
On the morning of 15 July 1944, Soviet artillery and mortars opened fierce fire preparations. The resulting dust, sand and smoke clouds severely reduced visibility. The Red Army followed the artillery preparation with an infantry assault supported with armored units. By midday, the Finnish defense had been able to stop the Soviet attacks everywhere except on the west side of Nietjärvi, where 1st and 3rd battalions of 44th Infantry Regiment were unable to hold back the Soviets. The Soviets followed their initial success with another breakthrough attempt on the northwestern shore of Lake Nietjärvi, in Yrjölä. Lack of reserves made it difficult for the Finns to respond to the attacks, but by evening they had succeeded in stopping the Red Army breakthrough attempt, apart from a 400 m wide section of the line which the Soviets held tight. Throughout the evening, the Soviet offensive continued relentlessly backed by heavy air support. The Finnish Air Force also took part in the battle, bombing Red Army formations on the southeastern edge of Lake Nietjärvi. Artillery battalions supporting the Finnish 5th Division fired 10,170 rounds and 4,900 mortars on 15 July.

On the morning of 16 July, the Finns launched a counter-attack to regain the defense line. The entire day saw continuous heavy fighting. By evening the Soviets held on to a part of Nietjärvi village, and part of the defense line (a stretch of line consisting of connected trenches) on a low hill in that area. As a frontal assault was deemed to be too expensive, the Finns chose to cut off the Soviets by assaulting along the trenches, with artillery being used to prevent Soviet reinforcements from reaching the area. At 22:30 that evening, the Finns began an artillery preparation which was immediately followed by an infantry assault along the trenches from both ends, using automatic rifles, hand grenades and flame throwers.

In the early morning of 17 July 1944, the Finnish units approaching the trench from both ends managed to link up with the help of the flame throwers. Only a small portion of the Red Army soldiers trapped in the trench or beyond it had escaped. Soviet forces tried to support the troops fighting in the trenches but Finnish artillery prevented reinforcements from reaching the area.

== Losses, and conclusion ==
The Red Army had not been able to penetrate through the defense of the Finnish 5th Division in the U-line. The heaviest losses were suffered by the Soviet 114th Rifle Division. The Soviet 762nd Rifle Regiment was totally destroyed. The Finns captured the Red Army message to its headquarters: "The Regiment destroyed, the flag saved". The main bulk of the two other regiments of the Soviet 114th Division were also destroyed, and the Soviet 272nd Rifle Division suffered heavy losses. Around 40 Red Army tanks, which had attacked in the direction of Nietjärvi, were lost. The breakthrough attempt cost the Soviets over 6,000 casualties, of whom over 2,000 died in the relatively short but brutal battle. Few Red Army soldiers were captured by the Finns.

The Finnish Army suffered 500 dead or missing and 700 wounded. Some soldiers might have died outside of the Nietjärvi battleground.

During the five days from 11 to 15 July, the Finnish field artillery fired 54,300 rounds in the U-line, more than in any other battle during the summer of 1944. They also fired 24,400 mortars. The infantry battalions had the highest recorded artillery support, with 1.4 artillery battalions per infantry battalion. The Finns deployed a surprise element, inflicting heavy damage on enemy forces with very short half-minute or one-minute artillery barrages and counter-battery firing. This happened without notable Finnish air force support.

The efficient cooperation of the elements of the Finnish armed forces helped the Aunus Group to stop the Soviet Karelian Front's advance along the shores of Ladoga at the U-line. The concentrated field artillery and mortar fire power played a vital role, as in many other critical combats during summer of 1944. The Soviet 7th Army's attempt to get around the U-line resulted in smaller engagements on the frontier north of lake Ladoga. The Soviet move to extend the front required Finns to extend their line as well, setting the stage for the Battle of Ilomantsi fought further to the north. The Finnish defense had prevented the Red Army from advancing from the north side of Lake Ladoga into the battle stages of the Karelian Isthmus. If the Red Army had not been stopped here, the Finnish forces fighting on the Karelian Isthmus would have been left between two Soviet armies on the narrow Isthmus, in the area limited by the Gulf of Finland in the south, and Lake Ladoga in the north.
