= 1st Regiment =

In military terms, 1st Regiment or First Regiment may refer to:

== Australia ==
- 1st Regiment, Royal Australian Artillery
- 1st Aviation Regiment (Australia)

== France ==
- 1st Marine Infantry Regiment
- 1st Infantry Regiment (France)

== Germany ==
- Jäger Regiment 1 (Bundeswehr)
- 1st Foot Guards (German Empire)
- 1st (Emperor Alexander) Guards Grenadiers
- 1st (1st East Prussian) Grenadiers "Crown Prince"
- SS Fortress Regiment 1

== Greece ==
- 1st Infantry Regiment (Greece)
- 1st Evzone Regiment
- 1st Raider Regiment (Greece), see 3rd Special Forces Division
- 1st Serres Regiment

== Indonesia ==
- 1st Air Defense Artillery Regiment (Indonesia)

== New Zealand ==
- 1st (Canterbury) Regiment

== Spain ==
- 1st King's Immemorial Infantry Regiment

== South Africa ==
- Durban Light Infantry, formerly 1st Infantry (Durban Light Infantry)

== Thailand ==
- 1st Infantry Regiment, King's Own Bodyguards

== United Kingdom ==
- 1st (Royal) Regiment of Foot
- 1st Regiment of Foot Guards
- 1st Regiment Greek Light Infantry
- 1 Regiment RLC, a unit of the Royal Logistic Corps
- 1 Regiment Army Air Corps

== United States ==
- 1st Infantry Regiment (United States)
- 1st Marine Regiment (United States)
- 1st Massachusetts Infantry Regiment, a unit in the American Civil War
- 1st Missouri State Militia Cavalry, a unit in the American Civil War
- 1st Enrolled Missouri Militia, a unit in the American Civil War
- 1st Aviation Regiment (United States)

== Yugoslavia ==
- 1st Fighter Regiment
- 1st Yugoslav Fighter Regiment
- 1st Transport Aviation Regiment
- 1st Training Aviation Regiment
- 1st Air Reconnaissance Regiment

== See also ==
- 1st Aviation Regiment (disambiguation)
- 1st Cavalry Regiment (disambiguation)
- 1st Brigade (disambiguation)
- 1st Division (disambiguation)
- 1st Corps (disambiguation)
