= I Corps (Finland, Winter War) =

Corps of the Finnish Army during the Winter War

The I Corps was a formation of the Finnish Army during the Winter War. It was formed on February 25 from parts of the II Corps which had become too large to function properly. It fought during the final stages of the war on the front north of Viipuri.

== Order of battle ==
- 1st Division
- 2nd Division (former 11th Division)

== Commander ==
- Major General Taavetti Laatikainen (19.02.1940 - 13.03.1940).
