= 1st Wing =

1st Wing, No. 1 Wing, etc. may refer to:

== Commonwealth of Nations ==
- 1 Wing, of the Royal Canadian Air Force
- 1st Polish Fighter Wing, a WWII Polish RAF unit
- No. 1 Wing AAC, a former unit of the British Army Air Corps
- No. 1 Wing RAAF, a unit of the Royal Australian Air Force
- No. 1 Wing RAF
- No. 1 Wing RCAF, a former unit of the Royal Canadian Air Force
- No. 1 Wing SLAF, a training unit of the Sri Lankan Air Force

== US ==
- 1st Bombardment Wing, of the US Army Air Forces, designated 1st Wing 1919–1924 and 1935–1940
- 1st Fighter Wing, of the US Air Force
- 1st Marine Aircraft Wing
- 1st Special Operations Wing, of the US Air Force
- 1st Space Wing, a former US Air Force unit
- Carrier Air Wing One, of the US Navy

== Worldwide ==
- 1st Air Force Wing Reserve, a unit of the Philippines Air Force
- 1st Air Wing (JASDF), a unit of the Japan Air Self-Defense Force
- 1st Wing (Belgium), a unit of the Belgian Air Component
- Flugabwehrraketengeschwader 1, a unit of the German Air Force
- Wing 1 Nakhon Ratchasima, a unit of the Royal Thai Air Force
