= 1 Squadron =

1 Squadron, 1st Squadron or No. 1 Squadron may refer to:

== Australia ==
- No. 1 Squadron RAAF
- No. 1 Airfield Operations Support Squadron RAAF
- No. 1 Security Forces Squadron RAAF

== United Kingdom ==
- No. 1 Squadron RFC, Royal Flying Corps
- No. 1 Squadron RAF, Royal Air Force
- No. 1 Squadron RAF Regiment
- No. 1 Squadron RNAS, Royal Naval Air Service
- 1st Aircraft Carrier Squadron
- 1st Destroyer Squadron
- 1st Frigate Squadron (United Kingdom)

== United States ==
- 1st Air and Space Test Squadron
- 1st Airborne Command Control Squadron
- 1st Airlift Squadron
- 1st Combat Communications Squadron
- 1st Expeditionary Space Control Squadron
- 1st Fighter Squadron
- 1st Helicopter Squadron
- 1st Reconnaissance Squadron
- 1st Space Control Squadron
- 1st Space Launch Squadron
- 1st Space Operations Squadron
- 1st Special Operations Squadron
- VBF-1, Bombing Fighting Squadron One, U.S. Navy
- Fighter Plane Squadron 1, VF-1, U.S. Navy
- Fighter Squadron 1 (United States Navy), VF-1
- Marine Air Control Squadron 1, U.S. Marine Corps
- Destroyer Squadron 1, U.S. Navy
- Submarine Squadron 1, U.S. Navy
- Coast Guard Squadron One

== Other countries ==
- No. 1 Squadron RNZAF, New Zealand
- No. 1 Squadron IAF, India
- 1 Squadron SAAF, South Africa
- 1st Squadron (Belgium)
- 1st Air Squadron, a unit in the 31st Air Wing, Indonesian Air Force
