= Khelyulya =

Khelyulya Хелюля
- Urban-type settlement
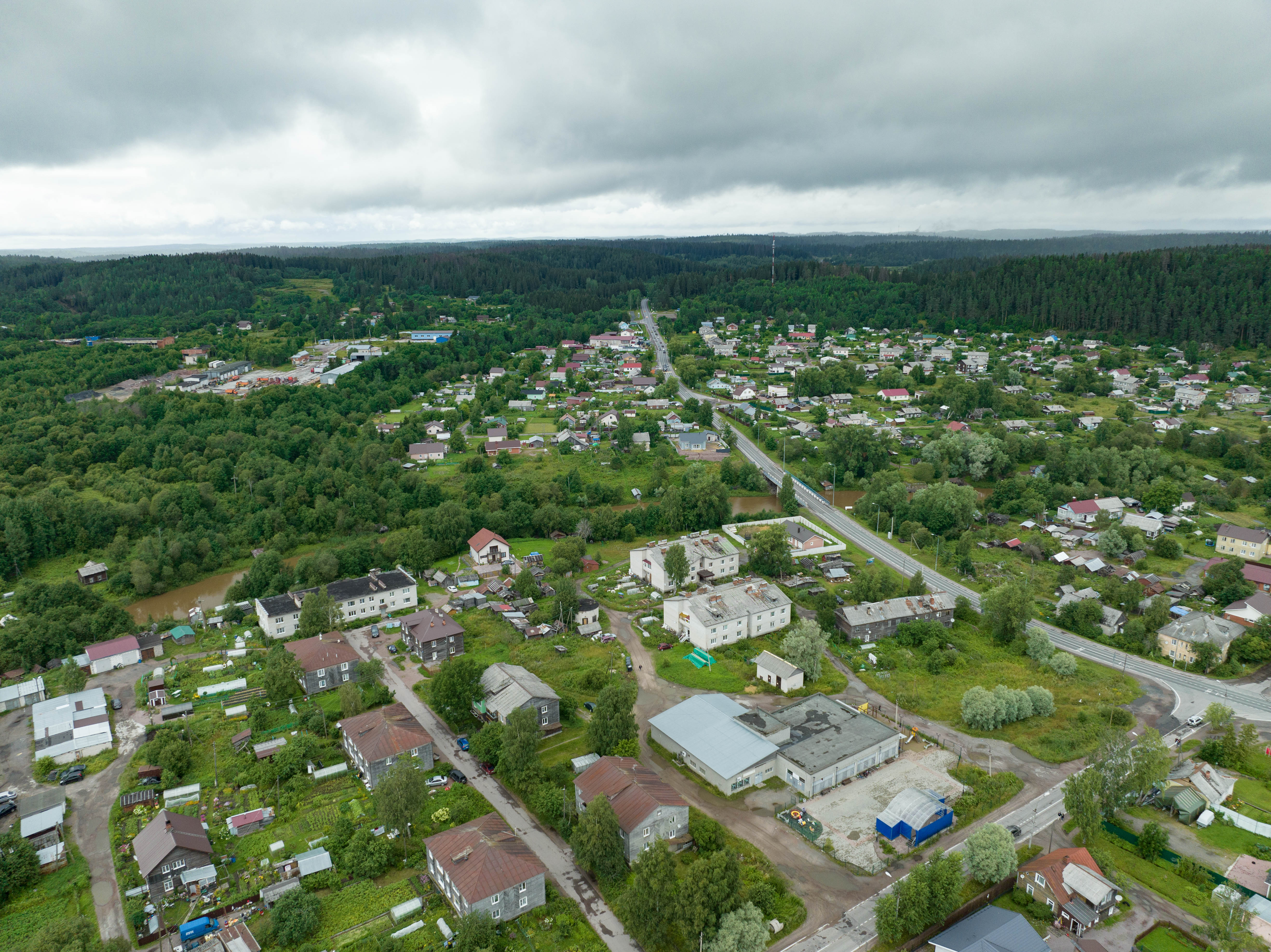
- Aerial view at the settlement in July 2022
- Interactive map of Khelyulya
- Location of Khelyulya Khelyulya (Karelia)
- Coordinates: 61°45′N 30°41′E
- Country: Russia
- Federal subject: Republic of Karelia
- Urban-type settlement status since: 1972

Population (2010 Census)
  - Total: 2,793
  - Estimate (2025): 1,777 (−36.4%)

Administrative status
  - Subordinated to: town of republic significance of Sortavala

Municipal status
  - Municipal district: Sortavalsky Municipal District
  - Urban settlement: Sortavalsky Urban Settlement
  - Capital of: Sortavalsky Urban Settlement
- Time zone: UTC+3 (UTC+03:00)
- Postal code: 186760
- OKTMO ID: 86610165051

Khelyulya population
- 2010 Census: 2,793
- 2002 Census: 3,166
- 1989 Census: 3,727
- 1979 Census: 3,231

Khelyulya (Russian: Хелю́ля; Finnish: Helylä) is an urban locality (an urban-type settlement) under the administrative jurisdiction of the town of republic significance of Sortavala in the Republic of Karelia, Russia, located on the Tokhma River, 278 kilometers (173 mi) west of Petrozavodsk, the capital of the republic. As of the 2010 Census, its population was 2,793.

== History ==
The village was first mentioned in the scribe book of the Korelsky uyezd (Vodskaya Pyatina) Dmitry Kitaev 1500: «the village of Gelyulya on the river on Gelyulya». In 1641, when this territory was under the control of Sweden, the first Christian church was built in Khelyulya (burned down already in 1657).

=== In the Russian Empire ===
From 1700 to 1721, the Tsardom of Russia and Sweden fought a war for supremacy in the Baltic. As a result, according to the Treaty of Nystad of 1721, all of Old Finland was ceded to Russia. The Vyborg Province was formed on the recaptured territory.

In July 1766, the first quarry was laid on the island of Joensuu, a month later they began to break marble in Ruskeala. From 1769 to the middle of the XIX century, the delivery of marble from Ruskeala to St. Petersburg in winter was carried out overland from the quarries to the pier in the village of Gelyulya (Khelyulya).

«About 30 versts are considered to reach the pier, located on the Gelule, from the Ruskalskaya breakage, through which marble is transported by dry route, which is worth a lot of labor and dependency»., academician N. Ya. Ozeretskovsky, «A journey through the Ladoga and Onega Lakes» (1785).

In 1811, the Vyborg province became part of the Grand Duchy of Finland (which became part of Russia in 1809). Khelyulya was part of the Serdobolsky district.

In 1915, the construction of a factory for the manufacture of furniture, including school furniture, as well as children's toys made of wood, began in Khelyul. (Helylä O.Y.). At the same time, a sawmill belonging to the factory was built. In 1916, the new company began its work. That year, 220,000 pairs of ski poles were manufactured at the factory for the Russian military department. By that time, in Khelyul, the railway and the postal tract passed almost under the walls of the workshops.

=== Finland (1917-1940) ===
Khelyula was one of the 66 villages of Sortavala parish.

In the 1920s and early 1930s, the main customer of Helylä Oy products was the state. During these years Helylä Oy was the largest woodworking enterprise in Finland. The capital of the association was 4 million marks, the number of workers was about 300 people. A total of 80 families lived in Khelyulya in the apartments of the combine, and the rest — in their own houses on the territory of the village and on nearby farms.

=== The war period ===
In 1939, after the shelling of Mainila the Soviet Union began hostilities against Finland. After three months of fighting, a peace treaty was concluded between the countries, according to which the territory on which the settlement was located was ceded to the USSR. The Finnish population was evacuated to the Finnish cities of Oulu and Kokkola. In their place, settlers were settled, primarily from Belarus and the Vologda Oblast.

In 1940, the administrative division of the received territory was carried out. Khelyulya entered the Rautakangassky village Council. A collective farm named after him was created in Khelyul. Telman.

In 1941, with the outbreak of the German war in alliance with Finland against the USSR, Finnish troops regained control of the territory of Khelyul and the area of Sortavala and held it until September 1944. In 1941, Finnish immigrants also began to return. After the end of the Soviet-Finnish War of 1941-1944 on September 19, 1944, according to the Moscow Armistice, the Moscow Treaty of 1940 was restored — Khelyulya was again transferred to the USSR. In September, the second evacuation of the peaceful Finnish population from Sortavala took place. On September 22, 1944, the last train with refugees departed from Sortavala station.

=== The USSR ===
In May 1945, the first echelon of collective farmers of the Sortavala district arrived in Sortavala, returned from the Vologda Oblast, where they had been evacuated in 1941. In July 1945, work began on clearing and putting in order the steam power plant and the power plant of the Khelyul furniture factory. Due to the lack of technological equipment, the first stools and tables were made by hand. By the end of February 1946, the production of skis began, in March the first chairs were made.

In March 1958, the Khelyul and Sortaval furniture factories were merged into the Sortaval Furniture and Ski Factory.

In 1972, Khelyulya received the status of an urban-type settlement.

== Economy ==
=== Industry ===
In Soviet times, a large furniture and ski factory operated in the village, which produced the famous «Sortavala» skis. Now there are several small production facilities on its base, the largest of which is the factory for the production of plastic skis of «Sortavala Ski Factory» LLC and the production of «Raptek» fishing lures of the Finnish company «Rapala». Also near the village there is a Sortavala crushing and screening plant (production of crushed stone from granite mined at a local quarry).

== Culture ==
The village has a secondary school №7 and a kindergarten. There is also its own sports complex, a football stadium and a house of culture. The Tohmajoki River is popular with fishing and water sports enthusiasts.

== Administrative and municipal status ==
Within the framework of administrative divisions, the urban-type settlement of Khelyulya is subordinated to the town of republic significance of Sortavala. From December 2004 to July 2020, as a municipal division, Khelyulya, together with two rural localities, was part of Sortavalsky Municipal District as Khelyulskoye Urban Settlement.

== Attractions ==
- The mass grave of 366 Soviet soldiers who died during the Great Patriotic War. In 1981, a monument was erected on the mass grave — a granite figure of a grieving mother.
- A memorial sign on the site of the first Christian church, destroyed in 1657.
- Near the village, on a mountain with rocky slopes — the ancient Karelian settlement of Paaso (the settlement existed in the XII—XIII centuries).
