= Ruskeala (Mountain Park) =

Ruskeala Mountain Park Горный парк «Рускеала»
- Tourist complex
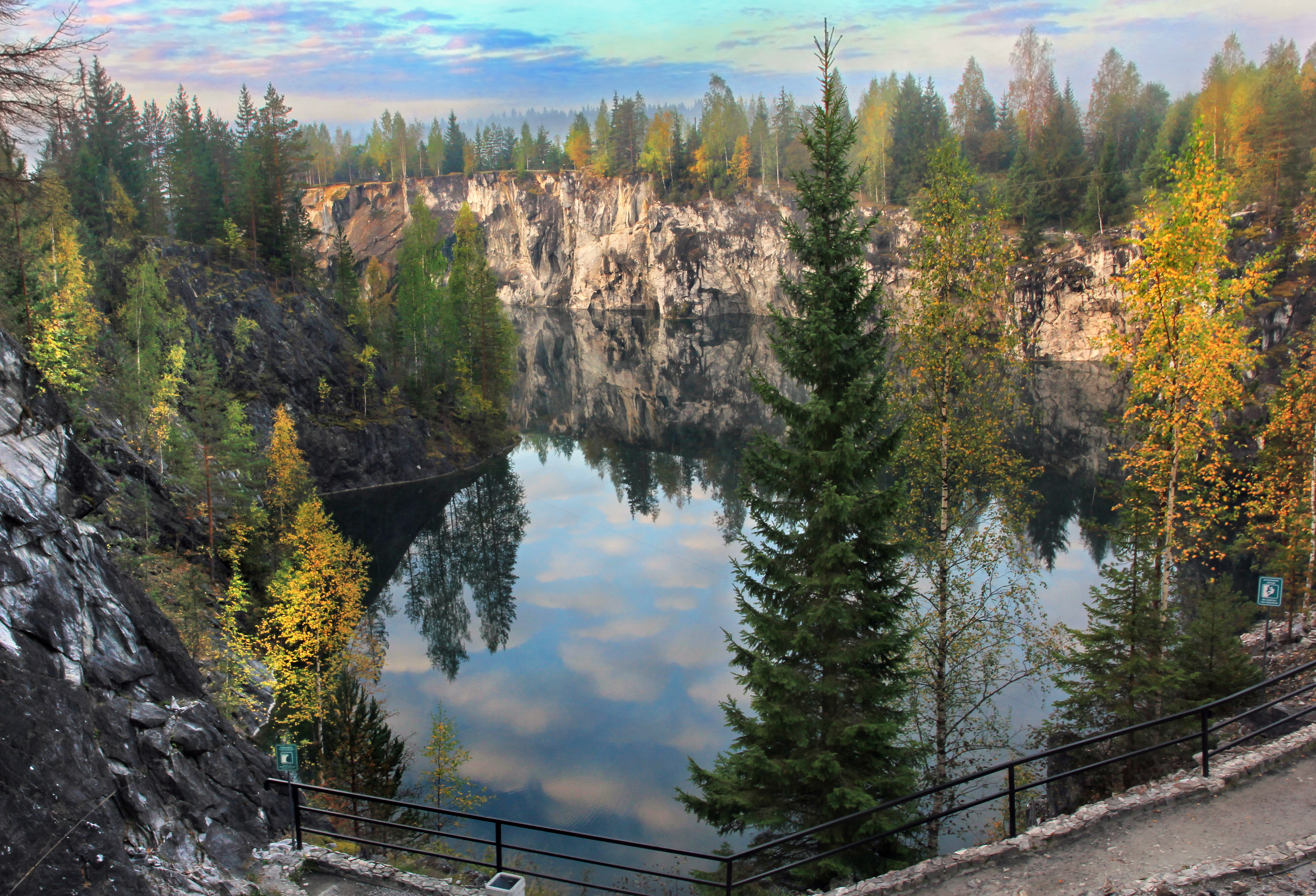
- Ruskeala Mountain Park in autumn 2014; View of the flooded marble quarry
- Interactive map of Ruskeala Mountain Park
- Coordinates: 61.9461°N 30.5814°E
- Country: Russia
- Federal subject: Republic of Karelia
- District: Sortavalsky District
- Opened: 2005

Ruskeala Mountain Park (Russian: Го́рный парк «Рускеа́ла») is a tourist complex located in the Sortavalsky District of the Republic of Karelia. Its central feature is a former marble quarry, now flooded by groundwater and designated as a cultural heritage site. The park is one of the earliest examples in northwestern Russia of the commercial development of a historical and cultural heritage site.

== Geography ==
The park is located near the settlement of Ruskeala, approximately 30 km north of Sortavala, on the banks of the Tohmajoki River.

A terminal railway station, Ruskeala Mountain Park railway station, is situated adjacent to the park on the line from Sortavala railway station.

== Description ==
The quarry extends approximately 460 metres from north to south and up to 100 metres in width. The vertical distance from the upper edge of the quarry to its bottom exceeds 50 metres. Water transparency reaches 15–18 metres.

The quarry walls contain an extensive network of underground workings, including adits and drifts connected by vertical shafts. Most of these passages were flooded after the World War II and cannot be drained. The total length of the underground workings amounts to several kilometres. Surviving structures include a former administrative building constructed from marble blocks and remnants of lime kilns.

== History ==
The quarries, identified by the pastor and local historian Samuel Alopaeus, a member of the Free Economic Society, began to be developed in 1765 during the reign of Catherine II of Russia. Early extraction works were supervised by master mason Andrey Pilyugin with consultation from Italian specialists.

Five quarries were established at the site, where marble of four varieties—ash-grey, grey-green, white with grey veining, and white-blue-grey—was extracted using drilling and blasting techniques. Up to 500 local residents were employed in quarrying operations.

Ruskeala marble was used in the construction and decoration of major buildings in Saint Petersburg and its suburbs. It was used in the облицовка of Saint Isaac's Cathedral (with architect Auguste de Montferrand personally selecting the stone), flooring of Kazan Cathedral, windowsills of the Hermitage Museum, and decorative elements of the Marble Palace and Mikhailovsky Castle. In the second half of the 20th century, the marble was also used in the underground halls of the Saint Petersburg Metro stations Primorskaya and Ladozhskaya station.

In 1846, following the construction of a water-powered sawing and polishing factory and the establishment of lime production, the workforce increased to approximately 800 people.

In 1859, the French writer Alexandre Dumas visited the site and later described it in his travel work "Travel Impressions. In Russia".

Between 1939 and 1947, quarry operations were suspended. Production at the marble and lime plant resumed in 1947 and continued until the early 1990s, including limited extraction of marble blocks and materials for lime, crushed stone, and decorative aggregates.

In 1998, the main quarry was granted protected status as a cultural heritage site. In 1999, it was included in the international tourist route Blue Highway.

In 2005, after obtaining the necessary permits, entrepreneur Alexander Artemyev opened the site as a tourist attraction.

In 2010, significant portions of the film Dark World were shot at the site. In 2013, the television series The Seventh Rune was also largely filmed in Ruskeala and nearby Hiidenselkä.

Since 2017, the park has hosted the annual summer music festival "Ruskeala Symphony".

On 1 June 2019, a tourist heritage train, the Ruskeala Express, began operating between Sortavala railway station and the park, using steam traction and interiors styled after the Nikolaevsky Express.
