= Riekkalansaari =

Island in Lake Ladoga, Russia

Native name: Риеккалансаари
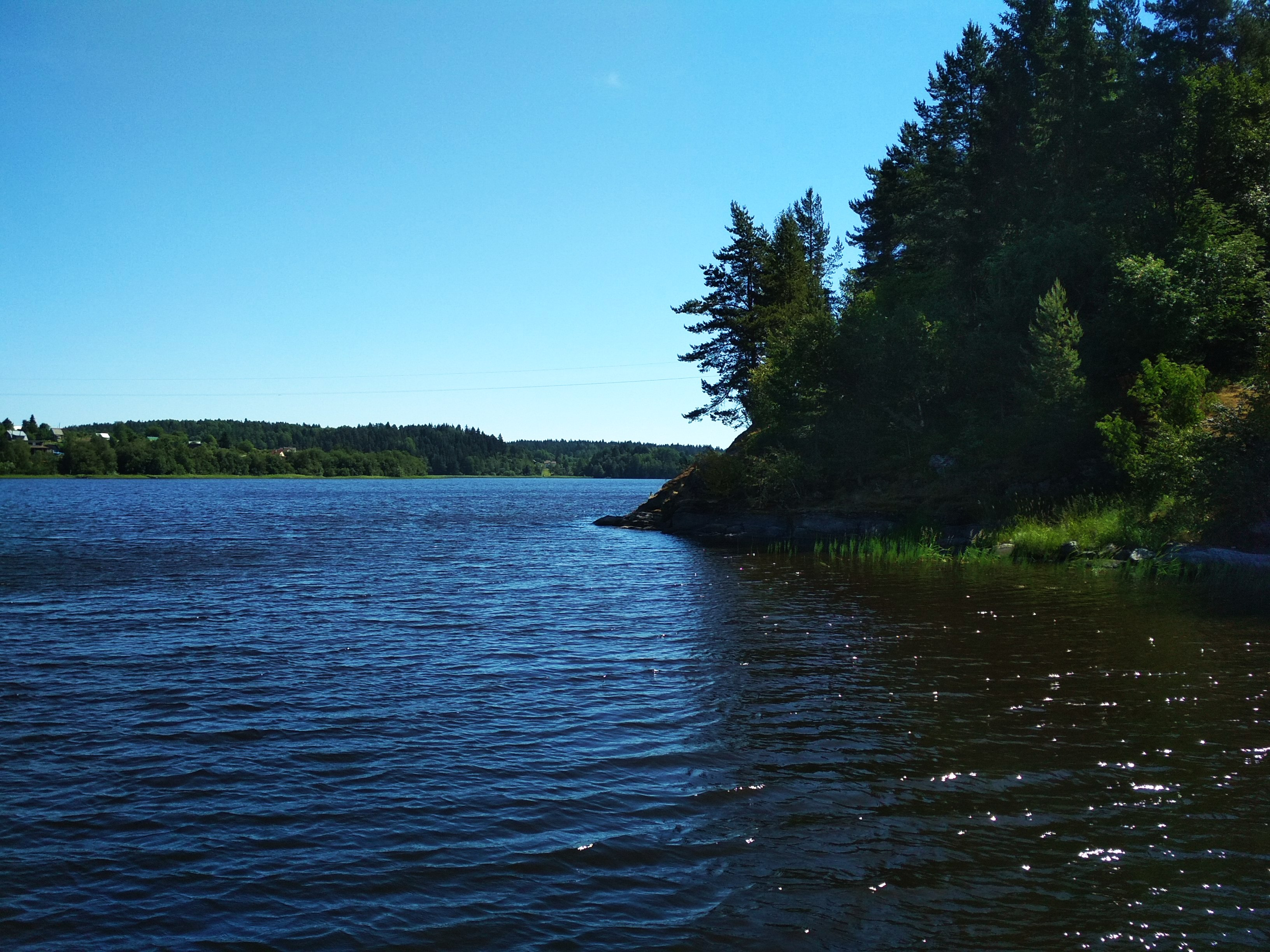
- Interactive map of Riekkalansaari

Geography
- Location: Lake Ladoga
- Coordinates: 61.670°N 30.770°E
- Area: 41 km^{2} (16 sq mi)
- Length: 12 km (7.5 mi)
- Width: 6 km (3.7 mi)

Administration
- Russia
- Federal subject: Republic of Karelia
- District: Sortavalsky District
- Municipality: Sortavala Urban Settlement

Demographics
- Population: 325 (2013)

Riekkalansaari (Russian: Риеккалансаари) is a 41-square-kilometer (16 sq mi) island in the northern part of Lake Ladoga in Sortavalsky District, Republic of Karelia, Russia. The island is located east of the town of Sortavala and is connected to the mainland by a bridge.

== Geography ==
Riekkalansaari is 12 kilometers (7.5 mi) long, 6 kilometers (3.7 mi) wide, and has a surface area of 41 square kilometers (16 sq mi). It is located in the northern part of Lake Ladoga near the town of Sortavala, and is separated from the mainland by the Vorssunsalmi strait and Lyappyayarvi, a section of the lake. The easternmost sections of the island are part of the Ladoga Skerries National Park, covering much of the archipelago of northern Ladoga. The distance between Riekkalansaari and the mainland is about 100 meters (330 ft), and the island is connected to the mainland by a narrow one-lane pontoon bridge.

There are seven settlements on the island: Krasnaya Gorka, Lamberg, Nukuttalakhti, Oyavoys, Rantue, Tokkarlakhti and Zarechye. The settlements are administratively part of the urban settlement (municipality) of Sortavala and had a combined population of 325 in 2013.

== History ==
The earliest evidence of agriculture on Riekkalansaari dates to the 4th and 5th centuries, becoming more permanent from the 7th century onward. One of the earliest known Iron Age graveyards in the northern Ladoga area, dated to the 6th century, has been found near modern Nukuttalakhti.

Riekkalansaari is an old center of the Sortavala area, where the first church of the Serdobol pogost was built in the late 13th century. In a taxation document of the Vodskaya Pyatina of the Novgorod Land from 1500, the following villages were mentioned:

- Rigola (Ригола, later Tukianmäki)
- Igakshala (Игакшала, Ihaksela)
- Ruchane (Ручане; according to Saulo Kepsu, the same as Ojavoinen, as ручей and oja both mean 'stream')
- Rekala (Рѣкала, Riekkala)
- Navolok (Наволокъ, later Airinniemi)
- na Popove beregu / Popovo Poberezhye (на Поповѣ берегу, Попово Побережье, later Rantue); the name "priest's shore" referring to the church located there
- Parola (Парола)

After the 1617 Treaty of Stolbovo, the area of Ladoga Karelia became part of Sweden; the town of Sortavala was established nearby in 1632. In 1721, the area was returned to Russia after the Great Northern War. The Orthodox church in Rantue was rebuilt in 1765 and renovated in 1891. The church still exists today and is located within the modern settlement of Krasnaya Gorka.

In 1811, the Vyborg Governorate, including the Sortavala area, was transferred to the Grand Duchy of Finland, which became the independent country of Finland in 1917. Within Finland, Riekkalansaari was part of the municipality of Sortavalan maalaiskunta. In the 1930s, the island was populated by over 2,000 people in fourteen villages and four school districts. The villages of Airinniemi, Hakala, Heikkurinsaari, Ihaksela, Nukuttalahti, Ojavoinen, Parola, Pohjus, Rantue, Riekkala, Sinilä, Telkinniemi, Tokkarlahti and Tukianmäki were located on the island. Access to the mainland was provided by the Vorssu ferry.

After the area was ceded to the Soviet Union following the Winter and Continuation Wars, three kolkhozes were established on Riekkalansaari, in the villages of Lamberg, Nukuttalakhti and Hakala. The Hakala kolkhoz existed only for a few years and the entire village was abandoned soon after due to a lack of road access, while those in Lamberg and Nukuttalakhti were united and turned into a sovkhoz in 1953. After the nearby island of Tulolansaari was abandoned in the 1960s, its fields were converted into pastures for cattle kept in Lamberg. A fur farm also existed on Riekkalansaari from 1958 until the fall of the Soviet Union in 1991. A pontoon bridge between Riekkalansaari and the mainland was built in 1974 and renovated in 2012.
