= Tulolansaari =

Island in Russia

Native name: Тулолансаари
- Interactive map of Tulolansaari

Geography
- Location: Lake Ladoga
- Coordinates: 61.678°N 30.890°E
- Area: 26 km^{2} (10 sq mi)

Administration
- Russia
- Federal subject: Republic of Karelia
- District: Sortavalsky District

Tulolansaari (Russian: Тулолансаари) is a 26-square-kilometer (10 sq mi) island in the northern part of Lake Ladoga in Sortavalsky District, Republic of Karelia, Russia. The island is uninhabited, having been so since the 1960s.

== Geography ==
Tulolansaari has a surface area of 26 square kilometers (10 sq mi). It is located in an archipelago in the northern part of Ladoga and is part of the Ladoga Skerries National Park. The closest settlements are located on the island of Riekkalansaari to the west, separated from Tulolansaari by the Khonkasalonselkya strait.

== History ==
In a taxation document of the Vodskaya Pyatina of the Novgorod Land from 1500, six villages on the island were mentioned:

- Undiyala, Lokhkala na Sovkine beregu (Ундіяла, Лохкала на Совкинѣ берегу, two villages around the later village of Soukanranta)
- Valgala (Валгала)
- Khotkola (Хоткола)
- Tulola bolshaya (Тулола большая, Suuri-Tulola)
- Tulola menshaya (Тулола меншая, Pieni-Tulola)

A granite quarry had existed on the island since the 1770s. Granite from Tulolansaari has been used in the Marble Palace and Kazan Cathedral of Saint Petersburg. The quarry was abandoned in 1918, soon after Finland had become independent and the border between it and Soviet Russia was closed.

The family of Nicholas Roerich lived on Tulolansaari in the summer of 1918; by October, they had moved to Viipuri. Today, there is a memorial plaque dedicated to Roerich on the island.

Within Finland, Tulolansaari was part of the municipality of Sortavalan maalaiskunta. The villages of Kannas, Möntsölä/Möntsölänsalmi, Pieni-Tulola, Putsinlahti, Soukanranta and Suuri-Tulola were located on the island; Möntsölä also extended into the island of Karpansaari to the east, while Soukanranta extended to Orjatsaari to the south. In the 1930s, Tulolansaari had nearly 2,000 inhabitants and three school districts.

After the Winter War, the island became part of the Soviet Union and was repopulated by 97 families mainly from the Astrakhan Oblast and Kuban in southern Russia, and two fishing kolkhozes were established there. Tulolansaari came under Finnish control again during the Continuation War and its population was evacuated to the Vologda Oblast. The Russian population returned to the island after the war, along with additional settlers mainly from the Byelorussian SSR. The population of Tulolansaari began moving to the mainland and Riekkalansaari in the 1960s after the kolkhozes had been disestablished, with the last person living on the island leaving in 1968. The island's abandoned fields were later used to graze cattle kept at the village of Lamberg on Riekkalansaari.
