= Ruskeala =

Rural settlement in Karelia, Russia

Ruskeala Рускеала
- Settlement
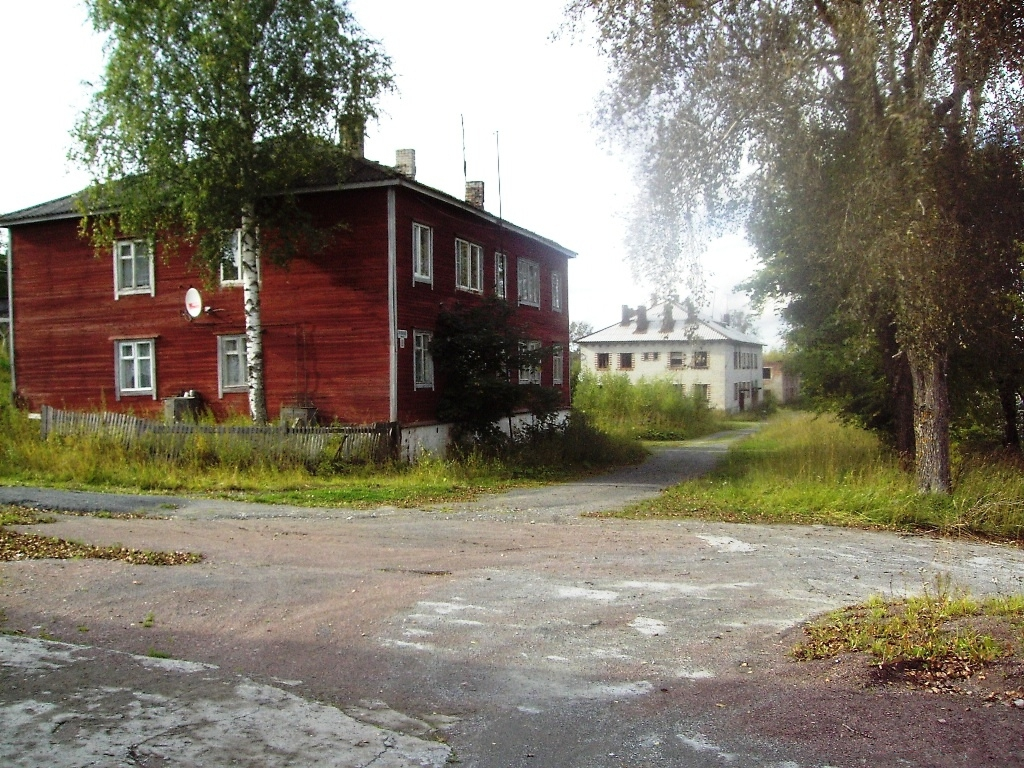
- Ruskeala
- Interactive map of Ruskeala
- Location of Ruskeala Ruskeala (Karelia)
- Coordinates: 61°55′56″N 30°35′22″E
- Country: Russia
- Federal subject: Republic of Karelia
- Administrative district: Sortavalsky District

Population (2010 Census)
  - Total: 694
  - Estimate (2021): 450 (−35.2%)

Municipal status
  - Municipal district: Sortavalsky Municipal District
- Time zone: UTC+3 (UTC+03:00)
- Postal code: 186759
- OKTMO ID: 86610411131

Historical population
| Year | Pop. | ±% |
|---|---|---|
| 2002 | 760 | — |
| 2009 | 730 | −3.9% |
| 2010 | 694 | −4.9% |
| 2013 | 659 | −5.0% |
Source: Census data

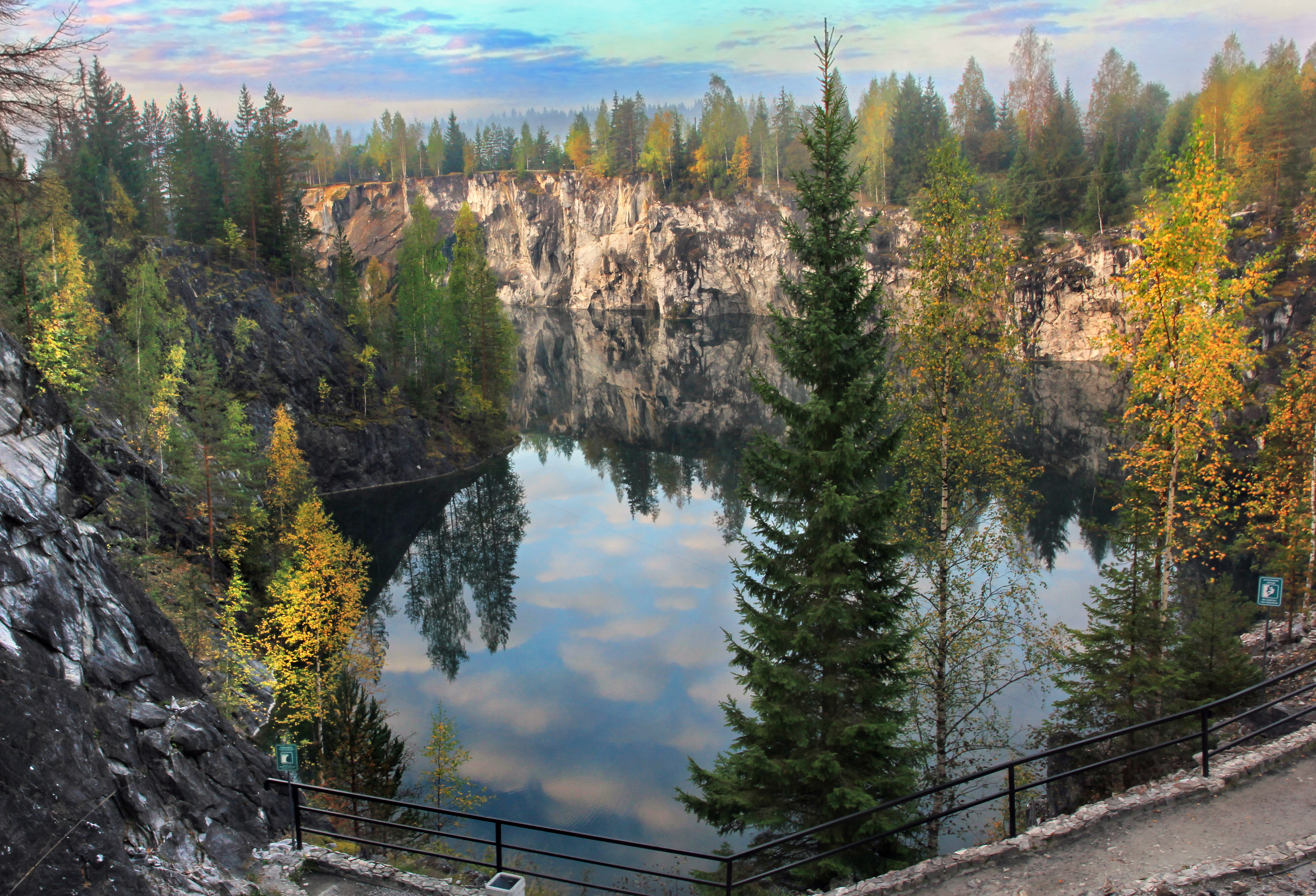
Marble Lake in Ruskeala. Karelia, Russia

Ruskeala (Russian: Рускеала; Finnish: Ruskeala) is a rural locality (a settlement) under the administrative jurisdiction of the town of republic significance of Sortavala in the Republic of Karelia, Russia. Within the framework of municipal divisions, Ruskeala is a part of Kaalamskoye Rural Settlement in Sortavalsky Municipal District.

An international tourist route, Blue Highway (Norway-Sweden-Finland-Russia) goes through Ruskeala. There is also a regular tourist train operated by a steam locomotive named after the town that runs to Sortvala since 2019.

== History ==
Before the Winter War and Continuation War, it was the seat of Ruskeala Municipality of the Viipuri Province in Finland. Ruskeala became the main village of its own parish, independent of Kitee, in 1721.

=== Quarries ===
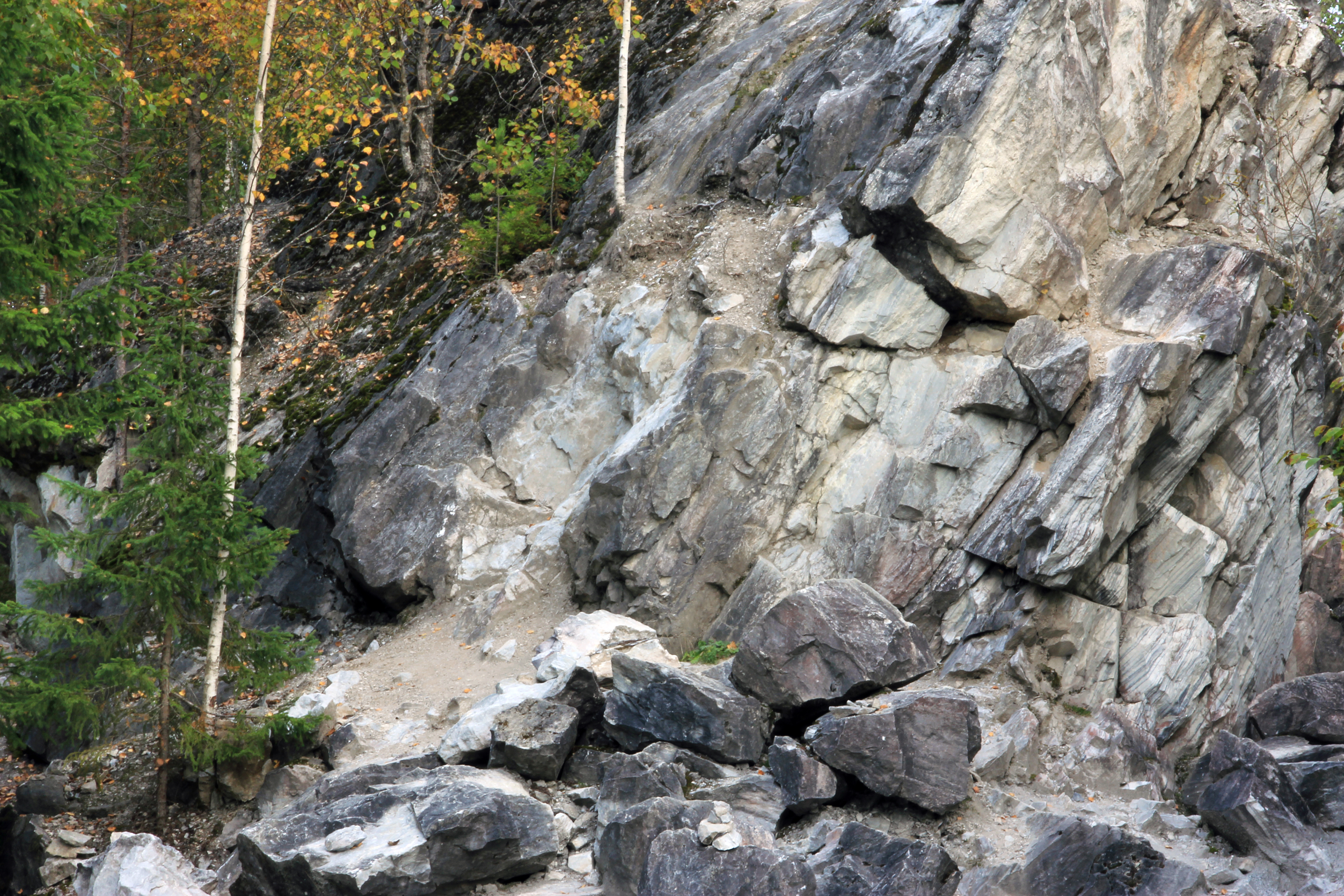
Rocky slope.Ruskeala Mountain Park. Karelia, Russia

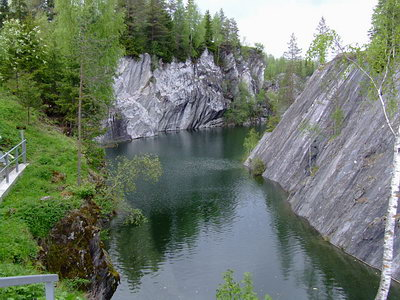
An inundated quarry

Not far from the settlement, the Ruskeala marble quarries are located. The deposit was discovered in 1765 and has been in operation since 1769. The integrity of the massif of the marble was cracked in the 20th century due to the use of dynamite. For this reason some quarries were abandoned and inundated. Now these picturesque deep quarries and adits with limpid water serve as a popular tourist attraction.

The length of the quarries from north to south is 460 meters, width – up to 100 meters. The distance from the highest point to the bottom is more than 50 meters. The transparency of the water reaches 15–18 meters.

The quarries, as well as some other marble deposits of Karelia, the Urals, and Italy, supplied various projects in St. Petersburg, including St. Isaac's Cathedral, Marble Palace, St. Michael's Castle, the interiors of the Winter Palace, New Hermitage and Kazan Cathedral, and decorations of the St. Petersburg Metro (namely the Primorskaya and Ladozhskaya stations).

== Nature ==
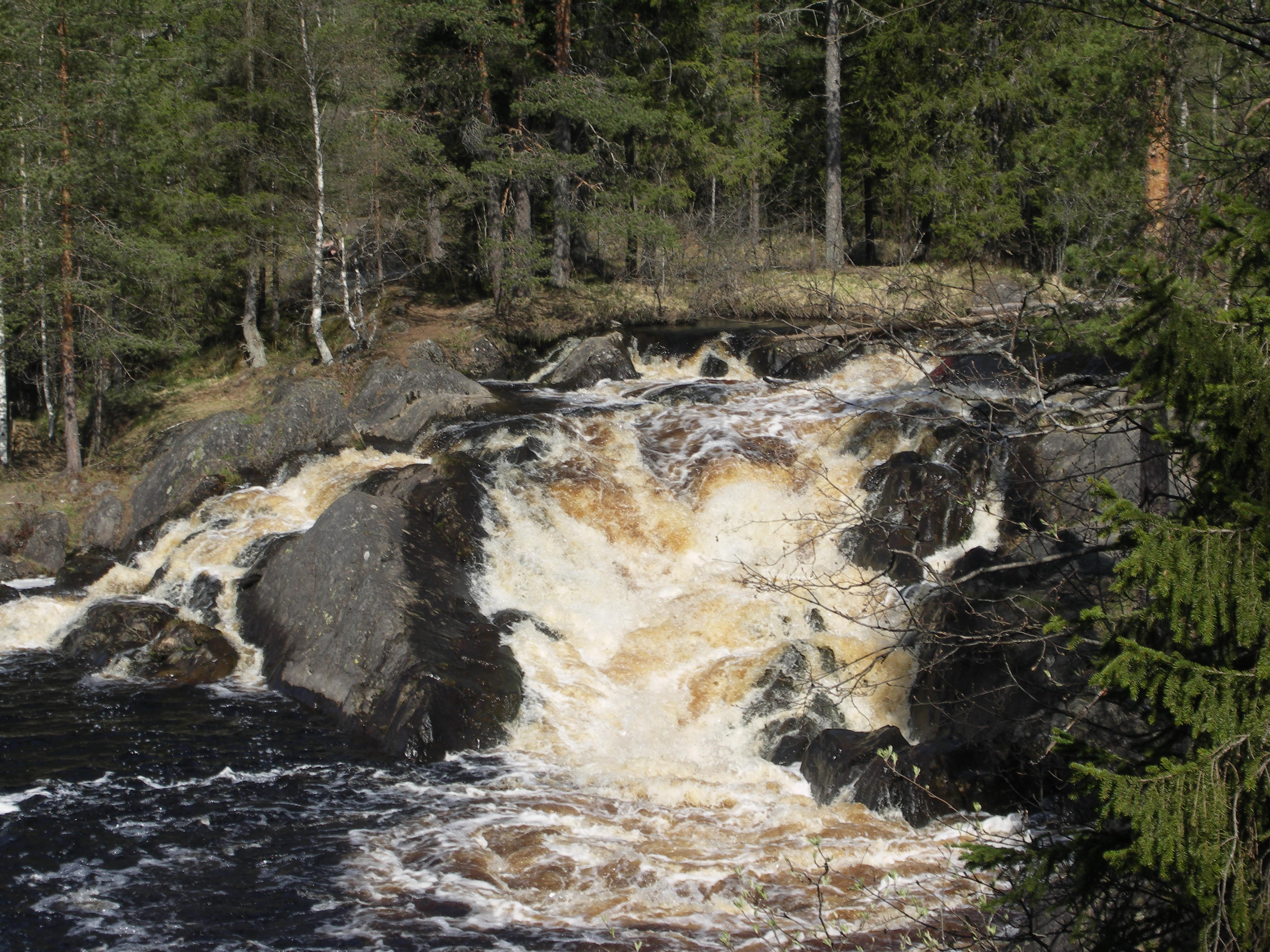
A waterfall

The quarry site has been designed to become Ruskeala Park, a regional park. A series of small cascade waterfalls on the Tohmajoki River is another popular tourist attraction situated near the settlement. The height of the waterfalls ranges from 3 to 4 meters. Waterfalls are known to tourists and extremes, overcoming them on kayaks.

== Notable people ==
Teuvo Aura (1912–1999), former Mayor of Helsinki and Prime Minister of Finland; and Yrjö Keinonen (1912–1977), the Chief of Defence of the Finnish Defence Forces between 1965 and 1969; were both born in Ruskeala.
