= Karelian Industrial Complex =

Russian surimi manufacturing leader

Группа Компаний "Карельский комбинат" «Karelian Industrial Complex»
- Type: Public
- Industry: Fishing industry
- Founded: 1940
- Headquarters: Sortavala, Russia
- Key people: Maxim Tralo, CEO
- Products: surimi, crab sticks, minced fish
- Number of employees: 450

Karelian Industrial Complex (Карельский комбинат) is a Russian fish processing plant and manufacturer of surimi, crab sticks and minced fish. Karelian Industrial Complex is the only manufacturer of surimi in Russia. Before 2006 the plant was called the Sortavalsky Fish Factory. It is the largest fish processing plant in the region, with a production volume of 24,000 tons per year. Karelian Industrial Complex has more than 450 employees. The plant is included in the list of socially important enterprises of the Republic of Karelia.

== History ==
In 1940, after the Russo-Finnish War of 1939—1940, the plant was built in the area of Sortavala, which became part of the newly created Karelo-Finnish Soviet Socialist Republic. In 1944 the plant was reconstructed after the Finnish occupation. In 1970 the plant was upgraded with new soviet equipment.

In 1980 it became the largest canned food plant in the Northwestern region of the Russian Soviet Federative Socialist Republic.

At the end of the 1990s the plant was on the verge of bankruptcy, but was saved by government loans and grants.

In 2001 the plant had to curtail production and produce only one type of canned fish: mackerel in oil. The company’s management was negotiating with investors. The process of renovation started by the end of the second half-year.

In 2002 Russian and foreign investors allocated funds for reconstruction of the plant. The Government of the Republic of Karelia supported modernization program of the plant. The company came back to its normal production capacities.

In 2003 crab sticks production shops were put into operation.

In January 2004 the investment program for reconstruction and technical reequipment of the enterprise was completed. At this period of time, the total investment volume reached about 20 million euros.

In 2005 the plant increased production of crab sticks in three times and started construction of logistics centers in Saint Petersburg and Moscow.

In 2006 the plant changed its name into Karelsky Kombinat (Karelian Industrial Complex).

In 2008 the plant started export deliveries in Belarus, Moldova, Kazakhstan and expanded the product line.

In 2010 the plant started export deliveries in Thailand and China.

In 2014 the enterprise began modernization of the production line. Modernized production starts in 2015 as a result of which production capacity should grow up to 2–2.5 thousand tons of products per month. By 2015 total sum of investment in Karelian Industrial Complex and its modernization amounts to 950 million roubles.

In 2014 the plant started exporting up to 90% of manufactured products mostly to the countries of Africa and Asia.

In 2014 with the participation of the Hermes-Sojitz investment foundation construction of a fish processing plant in Senegal was completed. The planned production volume is about 300 tons of various fish products per day.

== Major consumers ==
At this stage Karelian Industrial Complex provides almost 20% of the domestic market of surimi products.

Surimi products are delivered to the Ural Federal District (4%), Southern Federal District (3%), Far Eastern Federal District (1%), Central Federal District (1%), and Northwestern Federal District (1%). 90% of production is exported.

== See also ==
- Crab stick
- Fish sticks
- Surimi
- Hermes-Sojitz
