= Ladoga Skerries National Park =

Group of islands on Lake Ladoga, Russia

- (Russian: Ладожские шхеры)
- IUCN category II (national park)
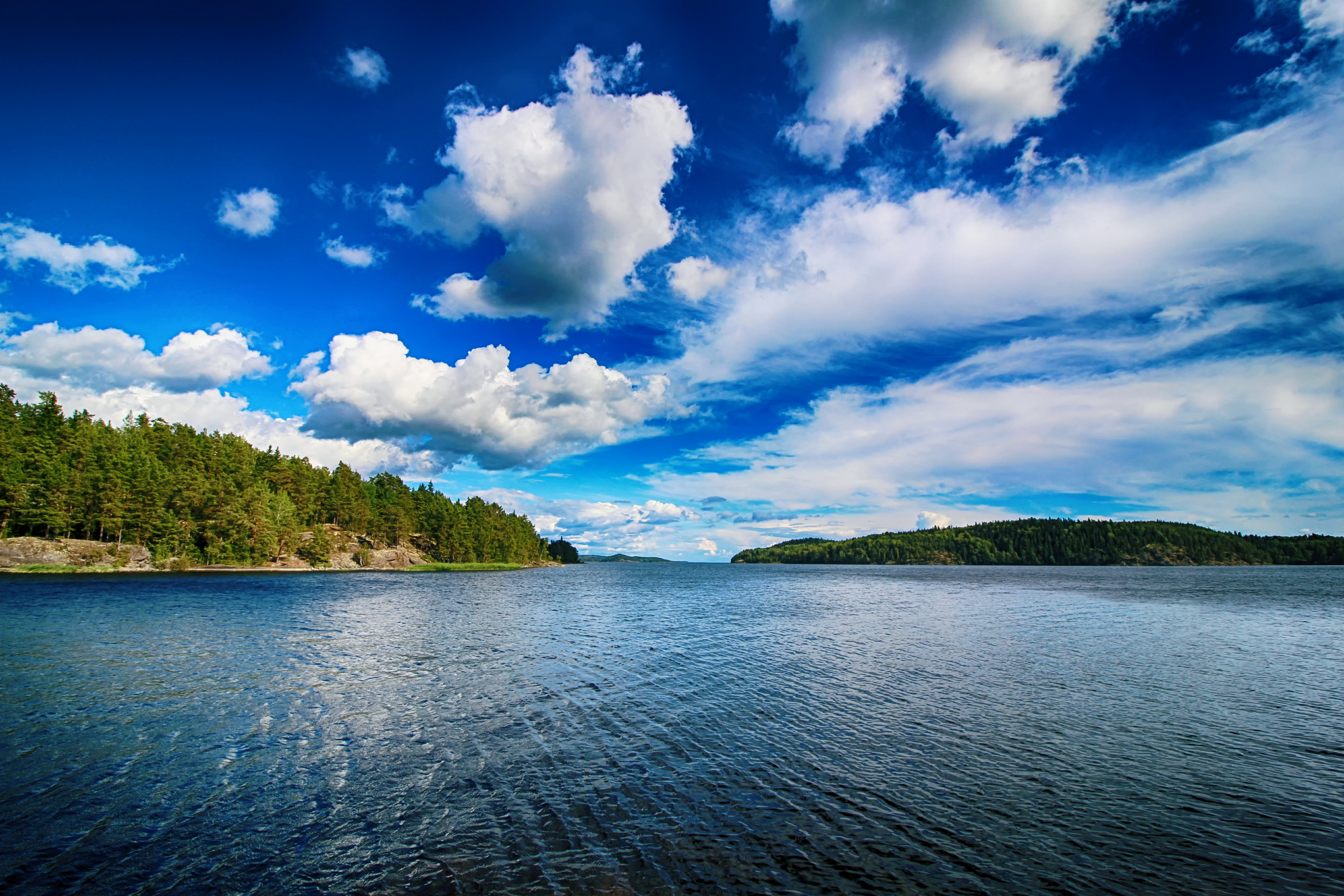
- Ladoga Skerries National Park

- Location within Russia
- Location: Republic of Karelia
- Nearest city: Saint Petersburg
- Coordinates: 61°36′N 30°50′E
- Area: 122,008 ha (301,488 acres; 1,220 km^{2}; 471 sq mi)
- Established: December 28, 2017
- Governing body: FGBU "Ladoga Skerries"

Ladoga Skerries National Park (Russian: Национальный парк «Ладожские шхеры») is located on the north and northwestern shores of Lake Ladoga in the Republic of Karelia, Russia. The park features numerous small rocky islands (skerries) on narrow bays and channels. The park was officially created in 2017.

== History ==
Lake Ladoga is the largest lake in Europe, with total area encompassing 17,890 km (11,120 mi); it has various fishes. In the post-World War I era, the lake became popular among tourists. The earliest proposal for creation of a national park was proposed by Karelian Research Centre of RAS in late 1980s. However, the project was stalled due to reasons such as close proximity in Sortavala and presence of various country houses. There was another unsuccessful attempt in 1999, when the European Union sponsored the project, spending 3.5 million euros. However, the authors of that project observed that: "the attitude of the local community toward the park is one of the thorniest questions." The park was finally established on December 28, 2017, by an order of the Government of Russia.

In January 2024, the Dossier Center, a London-based investigative group associated with Mikhail Khodorkovsky announced that a four square kilometer portion of this national park at Marjalahti Bay was designated as a luxury residence for President Vladimir Putin. The fenced-off portion includes a four-meter high waterfall that was previously open to public access.

== Topography ==
The park covers an archipelago of approximately 500 islands on the northwestern coasts of Lake Ladoga. The park is covered 44% by the water, and its area totals over 1,220 km (760 mi).

Lappeenranta, Finland

Climate chart (precipitation, max. and min. temperature)
J	F	M	A	M	J	J	A	S	O	N	D
2.1 23 16	1.8 24 16	1.7 31 22	1.5 43 30	2 58 42	2.8 66 52	3.1 72 58	3.1 68 56	2.4 58 48	2.5 45 38	2.4 35 30	2.4 23 23
- █ Average max. and min. temperatures in °F
- █ Precipitation totals in inches
- Source: https://en.climate-data.org
Metric conversion
J	F	M	A	M	J	J	A	S	O	N	D
53 −5 −9	46 −5 −9	43 −1 −6	38 6 −1	51 15 6	71 19 11	79 22 15	79 20 13	61 14 9	64 7 3	61 2 −1	61 −5 −5
- █ Average max. and min. temperatures in °C
- █ Precipitation totals in mm

== Ecoregion and climate ==
The park is in the southern latitudes of the Scandinavian and Russian taiga ecoregion, a region of conifers, and near the northern reaches of the Sarmatic mixed forests.

== Plants and animals ==
The islands are covered with coniferous forests, about 90% pine and 10% spruce. The non-forested land features meadows and swamps. Plant biodiversity is relatively high. There are 748 species of vascular plants that have been recorded in the park, of which 101 are on the protected list for the region. There is a high presence of bryophytes (a collective term for liverworts, hornworts, and mosses). Almost 350 species of bryophytes and over 700 species of lichens have been found in the park. Water covers 44% of the park with 3 known species that include freshwater whitefish, bream, and northern pike.

== See also ==
- Protected areas of Russia

== Works cited ==
- "Ladoga Skerries (Republic of Karelia)". Republic of Karelia. Archived from the original on December 10, 2021.
- "On the creation of the Ladoga Skerries National Park". Government of Russia. Archived from the original on December 10, 2021.
- Osipov, Alexander (2019). "Ecotourism in Russian Karelia: Emergence, Development, Opportunities". Finnish Journal of Tourism Research. 15 (1): 53–66. doi:10.33351/mt.79700. S2CID 202309940. Archived from the original on November 25, 2020.
- Osipov, Alexander (February 2, 2018). "Ladoga Skerries National Park". University of Eastern Finland. Archived from the original on December 18, 2021.
- Stepanova, Svetlana V. (2019). "The Northern Lagoda Region as a prospective Tourist Destination in the Russian-Finnish Borderland: Historical, Cultural, Ecological and Economic Aspects". Geographia Polonica. 92 (4). Polish Academy of Sciences. doi:10.7163/GPol.0156. ISSN 0016-7282. S2CID 213766765. Archived (PDF) from the original on January 2, 2022 – via ResearchGate.
- "skerry". Lexico. Oxford University Press. Archived from the original on January 2, 2022.
- "Karelia Government Releases Updated Report on Ladoga Skerries National Park". Karelia Regional Nature Conservancy. January 7, 2012. Archived from the original on January 2, 2022.
