= Paasonvuori =

Mountain near Sortavala, Russia

- fi/Paasonvuori, Paassonvuori, Paussunvuori
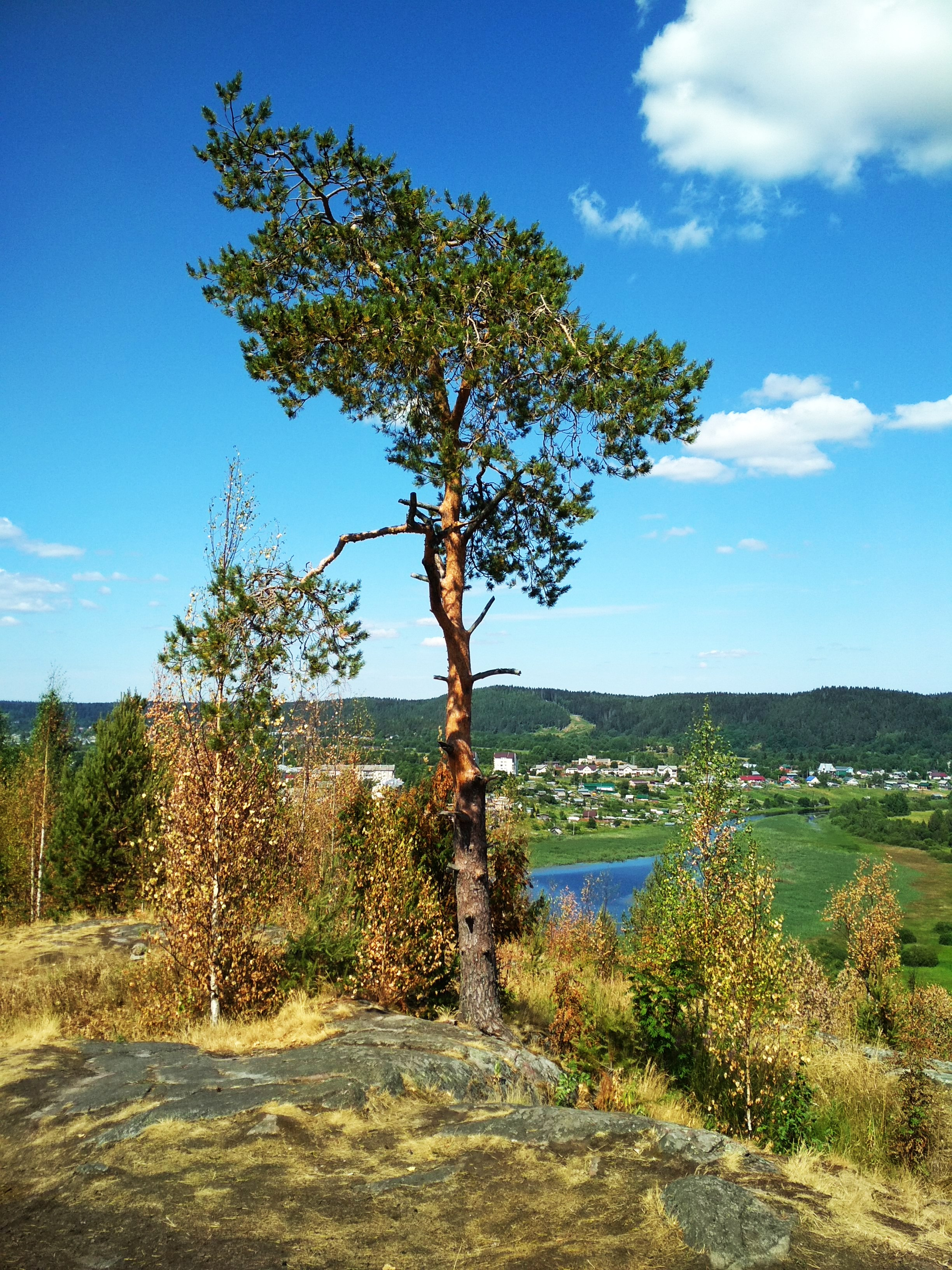

Highest point
- Peak: 79,2
- Coordinates: 61°43′53″N 30°42′00″E

Geography

Paasonvuori (Russian: Паасонвуори, Finnish: Paasonvuori, Paassonvuori, Paussunvuori, also (short) Russian: Паасо)is a hill (rock, height) near Sortavala, Russia.

Height - 79.2 m.

The Tohmajoki river (pictured) flows under the hill, as well as the Karmalanjärvi lake stretch.

According to archaeologists, there was a settlement Паасо on the hill:

One of the largest outposts within the boundaries of modern Karelia is the Paaso settlement, located on Mount Paasonvuori, which is located at the entrance to Sortavala from the side of the village of Khelyulya. At the top of this hill, almost 80 meters high, with a steep cliff on one side and a gentle slope on the other, in the 12th - early 15th centuries, there was a fortress... Ирина Сумманен, младший научный сотрудник сектора археологии Института языка, литературы и истории КарНЦ РАН
