= Sortavala =

Town in the Republic of Karelia, Russia

Sortavala Сортавала Sortavala (Karelian)
- Town
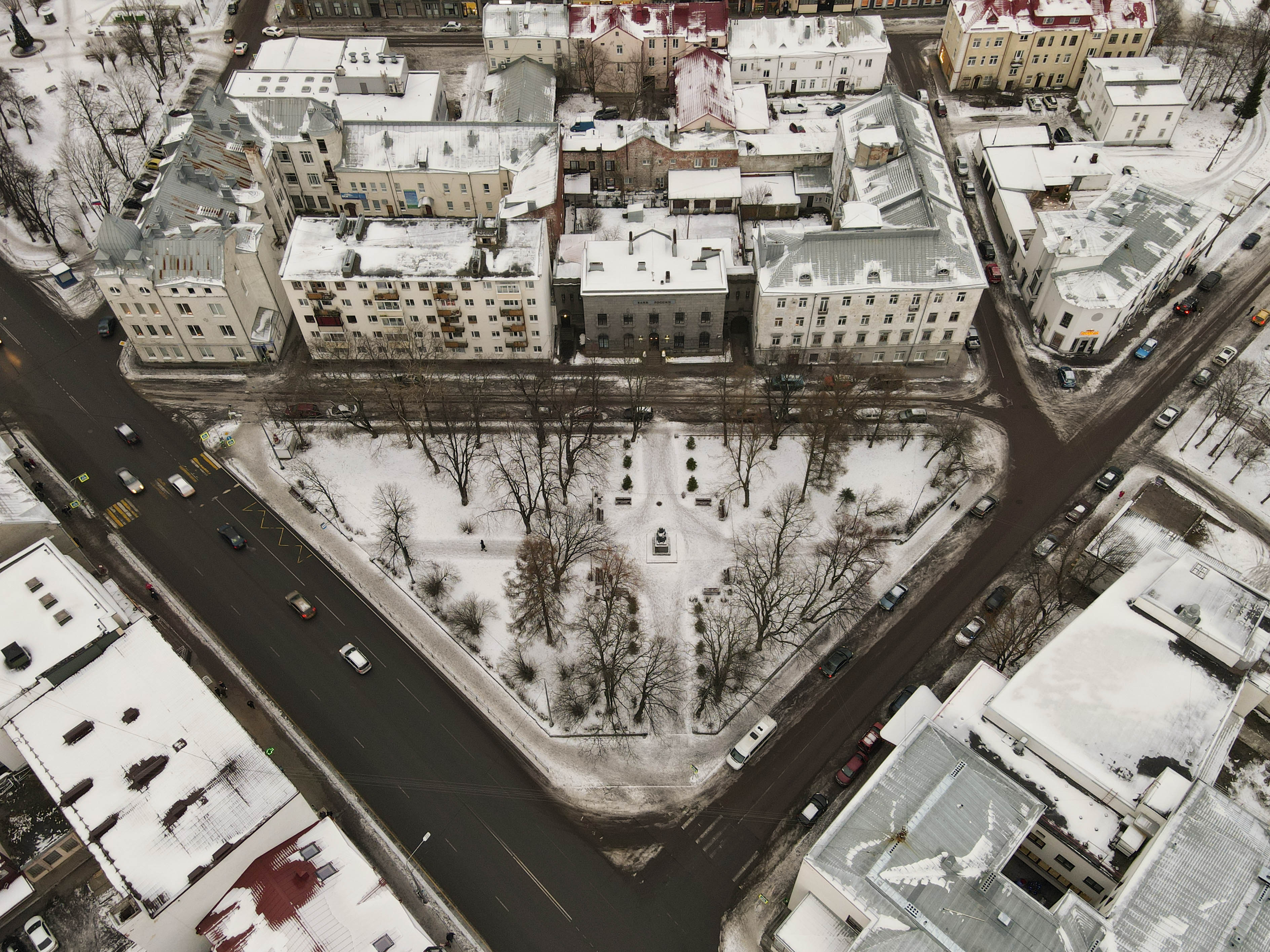
- An aerial view of the town center of Sortavala in 2020.

- Flag Coat of arms
- Interactive map of Sortavala
- Location of Sortavala Sortavala (Karelia)
- Coordinates: 61°42′20″N 30°41′45″E
- Country: Russia
- Federal subject: Republic of Karelia
- First mentioned: 1468
- Elevation: 5 m (16 ft)

Population (2010 Census)
  - Total: 19,235
  - Estimate (2023): 14,787 (−23.1%)

Administrative status
  - Subordinated to: town of republic significance of Sortavala
  - Capital of: town of republic significance of Sortavala

Municipal status
  - Municipal district: Sortavalsky Municipal District
  - Urban settlement: Sortavalskoye Urban Settlement
  - Capital of: Sortavalsky Municipal District, Sortavalskoye Urban Settlement
- Time zone: UTC+3 (UTC+03:00)
- Postal code: 186790
- OKTMO ID: 86510000001
- Website: городсортавала.рф

Sortavala (Russian: Сортавала; Finnish and Karelian: Sortavala; Swedish: Sordavala), in Russian sometimes known as Serdobol (Сердоболь), is a town in the Republic of Karelia, Russia, located at the northern tip of Lake Ladoga near the Finnish border, 246 kilometres (153 mi) west of Petrozavodsk, the capital city of the Republic of Karelia. The closest city on the Finnish side of the border is Joensuu, which is located 136 kilometres (85 mi) from Sortavala. In 2021, the population of Sortavala was 19,215.

== History ==
The district of Sortavala was first recorded in Swedish documents dating to 1468. Russian documents first mention it as Serdovol or Serdobol in 1500. It was ceded to Sweden after the Ingrian War.

With the 1721 Treaty of Nystad, the settlement was joined to Russia along with the rest of Old Finland and was given the Russian name Serdobol. It became known for its marble and granite quarries which provided materials necessary for construction of imperial palaces in St. Petersburg and its neighborhood. In 1812, along with the rest of Viipuri Province, it was joined to the newly formed Grand Duchy of Finland.

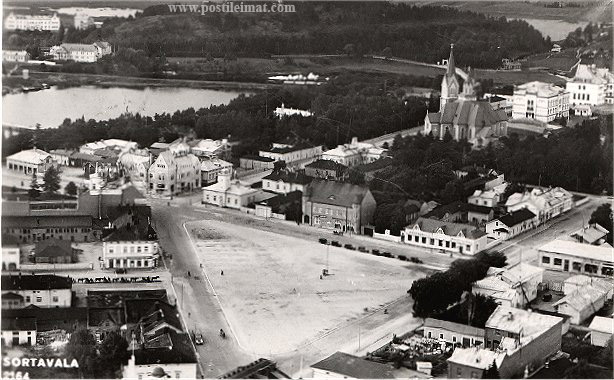
Old View

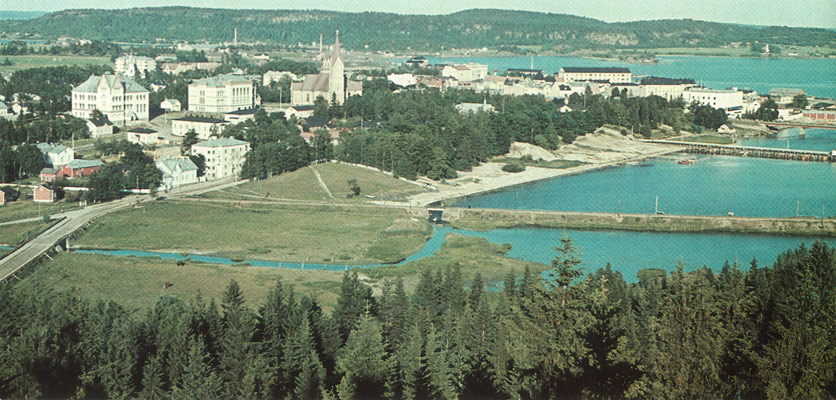
View in 1939

In 1917, the town remained a part of independent Finland. It suffered extensively from mass Soviet bombardment during the Winter War, and through the Moscow Peace Treaty Finland was forced to cede the town to the Soviet Union. All of the population of the town was evacuated for the first time. Like the rest of Finnish Karelia, Sortavala was retaken by Finland during 1941–1944 (the period of the Continuation War) and most evacuees returned to rebuild their homes. However, after the armistice of 1944, the Finns were evacuated again and the town was ceded back empty of population. After the war, the town was resettled by the Russian and Karelian population.

Until 1940, the Ladoga shore southwest of Sortavala had been one of the very few relatively densely populated areas north of the Karelian Isthmus populated by Karelians.

== Geography ==
=== Features ===
- Paasonvuori, 79.2 m. hill near Sortavala

=== Climate ===
Climate data for Sortavala
Month	Jan	Feb	Mar	Apr	May	Jun	Jul	Aug	Sep	Oct	Nov	Dec	Year
Record high °C (°F)	6.4 (43.5)	8.8 (47.8)	15.0 (59.0)	22.0 (71.6)	27.5 (81.5)	32.0 (89.6)	35.4 (95.7)	29.9 (85.8)	24.5 (76.1)	18.4 (65.1)	11.4 (52.5)	9.4 (48.9)	35.4 (95.7)
Mean daily maximum °C (°F)	−5.3 (22.5)	−4.6 (23.7)	0.6 (33.1)	7.0 (44.6)	14.2 (57.6)	18.8 (65.8)	21.9 (71.4)	19.6 (67.3)	13.9 (57.0)	7.2 (45.0)	1.1 (34.0)	−2.4 (27.7)	7.7 (45.9)
Daily mean °C (°F)	−8.4 (16.9)	−8.1 (17.4)	−3.4 (25.9)	2.6 (36.7)	9.0 (48.2)	13.9 (57.0)	17.2 (63.0)	15.3 (59.5)	10.2 (50.4)	4.6 (40.3)	−1.1 (30.0)	−5.3 (22.5)	3.9 (39.0)
Mean daily minimum °C (°F)	−11.5 (11.3)	−11.6 (11.1)	−7.4 (18.7)	−1.7 (28.9)	3.7 (38.7)	9.0 (48.2)	12.5 (54.5)	10.9 (51.6)	6.5 (43.7)	2.0 (35.6)	−3.3 (26.1)	−8.1 (17.4)	0.1 (32.2)
Record low °C (°F)	−42.8 (−45.0)	−36.0 (−32.8)	−28.3 (−18.9)	−18.6 (−1.5)	−6.6 (20.1)	−0.8 (30.6)	3.5 (38.3)	0.8 (33.4)	−5.8 (21.6)	−12.3 (9.9)	−24.8 (−12.6)	−33.2 (−27.8)	−42.8 (−45.0)
Average precipitation mm (inches)	47.2 (1.86)	35.9 (1.41)	34.6 (1.36)	31.7 (1.25)	42.9 (1.69)	61.8 (2.43)	58.0 (2.28)	84.8 (3.34)	63.5 (2.50)	68.9 (2.71)	65.9 (2.59)	62.4 (2.46)	657.6 (25.89)
Source: Weather and climate in Sortavala

== Administrative and municipal status ==
Within the framework of administrative divisions, it is, together with two urban-type settlements and forty-seven rural localities, incorporated as the town of republic significance of Sortavala—an administrative unit with the status equal to that of the districts. As a municipal division, the town of republic significance of Sortavala is incorporated as Sortavalsky Municipal District; the town of Sortavala and ten rural localities are incorporated within it as Sortavalskoye Urban Settlement. The remaining urban-type settlements and rural localities are incorporated within the municipal district into two urban settlements and two rural settlements.

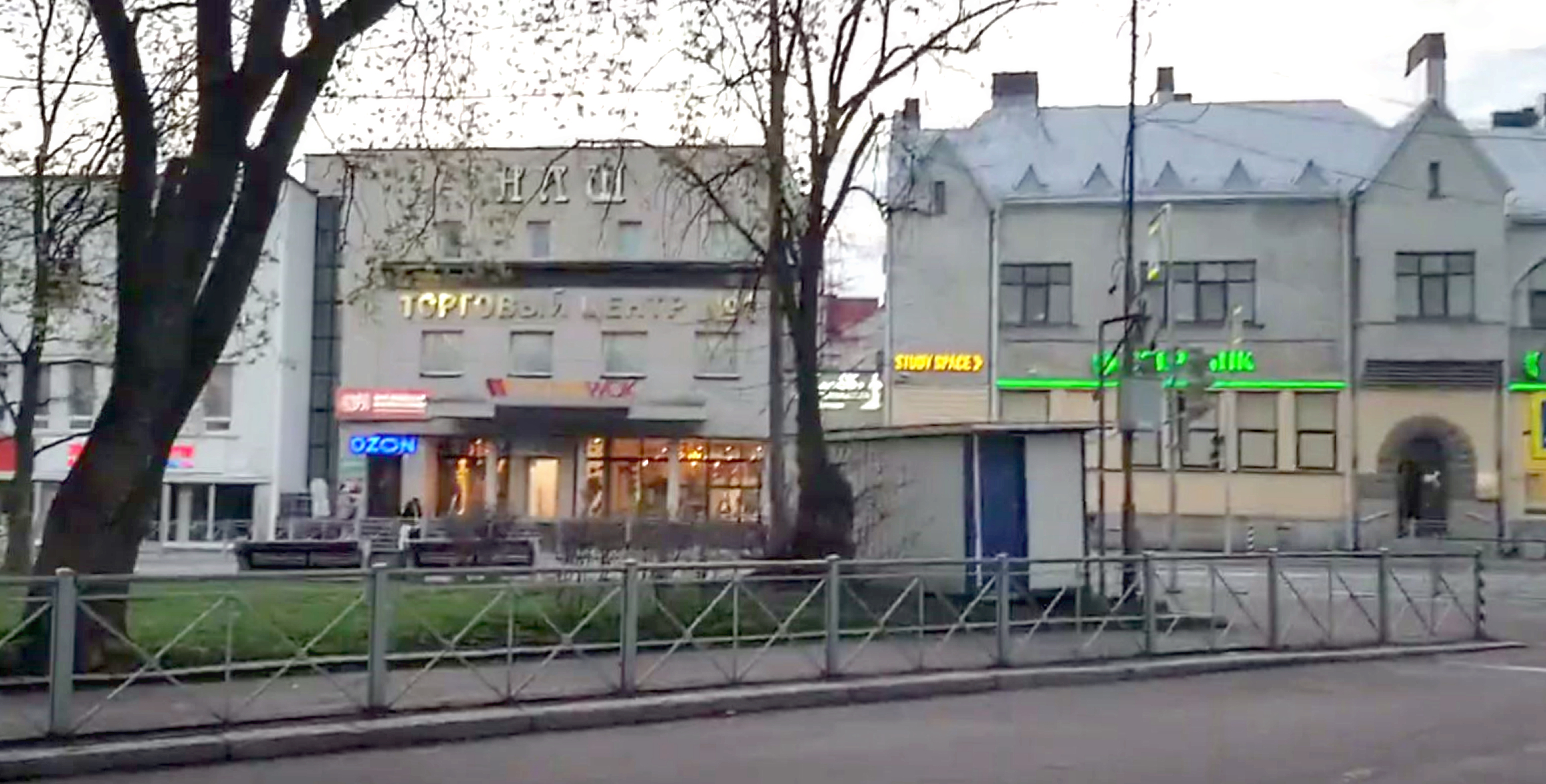
A corner of the Ulitsa Karel'skaya and Ulitsa Vyaynemyaynena streets in the center of Sortavala

Aside from the town of Sortavala, the urban settlement includes the rural localities of Khyumpyolya, Krasnaya Gorka, Lakhdenkyulya, Lamberg, Nukuttalakhti, Oyavoys, Rantue, Tokkarlakhti, Valaam and Zarechye. Krasnaya Gorka, Lamberg, Nukuttalakhti, Oyavoys, Rantue, Tokkarlakhti and Zarechye are located on the island of Riekkalansaari, while Valaam is located on the eponymous island of Valaam.

== Transportation ==
Sortavala is a railway station on the Khiytola-Matkaselkä railway.

== Layout and development ==
=== Architecture ===
The central part of the city consists mainly of stone 3–4-storey buildings built at the beginning of the 20th century (until the 1930s). As a rule, these are buildings in the style of Northern Art Nouveau (national Romanticism), neoclassicism, the most recent — functionalism, their authors are the most famous Finnish architects Uno Werner Ullberg, Gottlieb Eliel Saarinen, Johan Jacob Arenberg, etc. In addition, a large number of wooden buildings built in the middle of the 19th century, usually in the Empire style, have been preserved. The most notable buildings are:

- The building of the Bank of Finland (arch. Uno Ulberg, 1915)
- The building of the United Bank of the Nordic Countries (architect firm GLS, 1905)
- Lyceum building (arch. Johan Jacob Arenberg, 1901)
- The gymnasium building (arch. Johan Jakob Arenberg, 1911)
- The administration building of the Orthodox Church of Finland and the Church of St. John the Apostle (arch. Juhani Viiste, 1935)
- The house of the merchant Siitonen (arch. Ustin).
- Wing of the Evangelical Community house
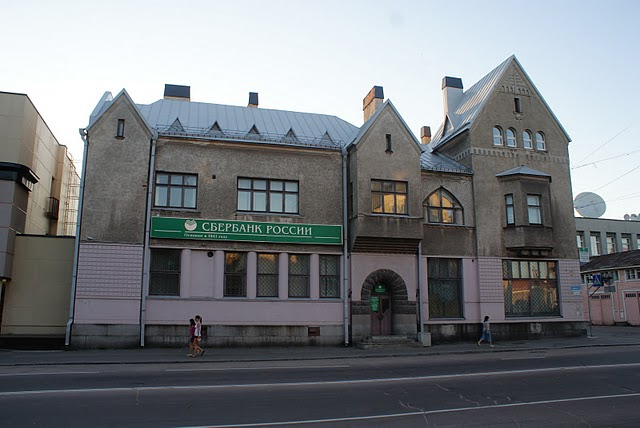
"Leander's House." Arch. Eliel Saarinen

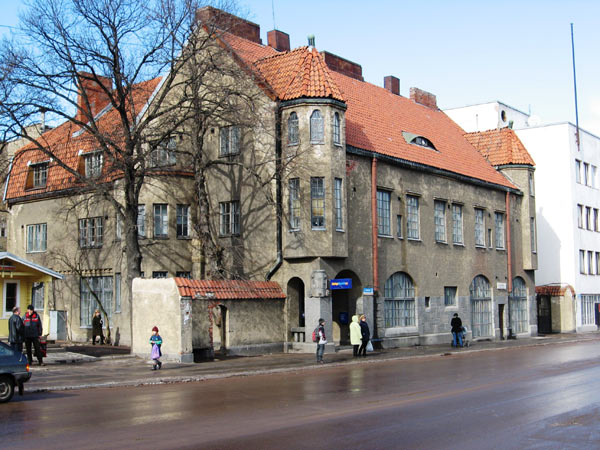
United Bank of the Nordic Countries (now the Post Office). Arch. Uno Werner Ullberg

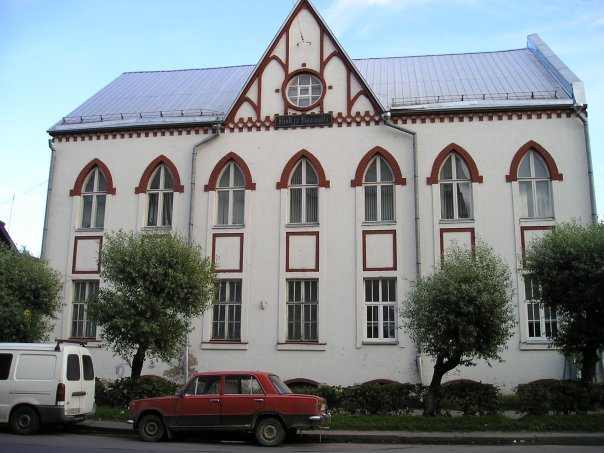
The former building of the publishing house of spiritual literature Risti ja Raamattu. Arch. Vyane Leander

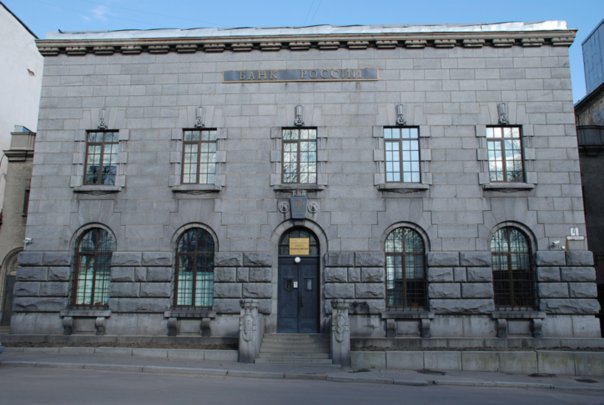
The former Finnish Bank (now the Bank of Russia). Arch. Uno Werner Ulberg

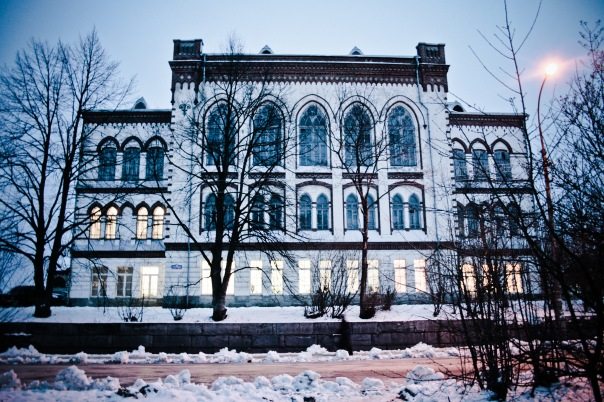
Former women's gymnasium. Arch. Johan Jakob Arenberg

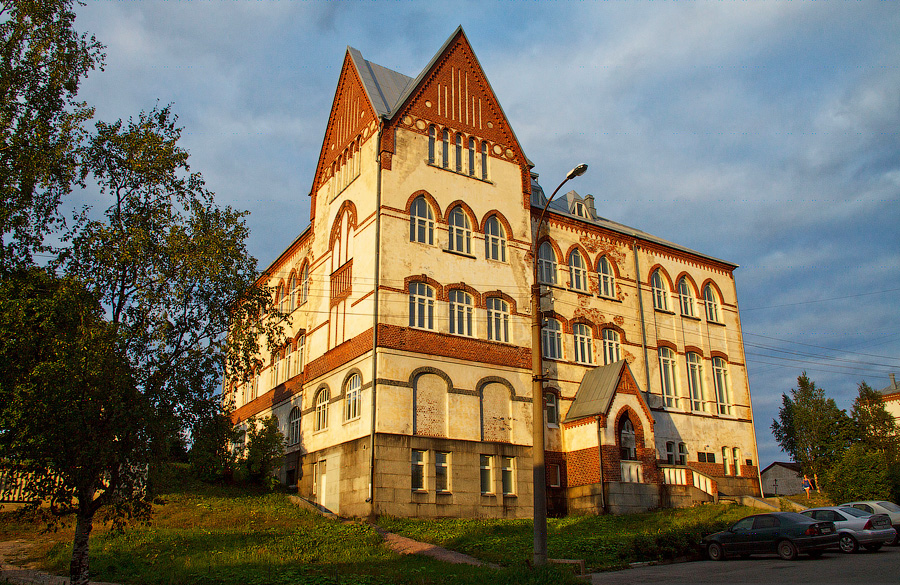
Former women's Gymnasium

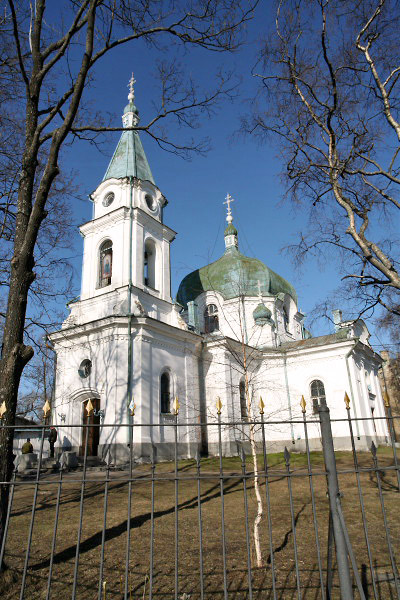
St. Nicholas Church. Arch. Nikolay Grebenka

== Industry ==
Urban development enterprise - Karelian Industrial Complex.

== Notable people ==
- Alexander Semyonovich Belyakov (born 1945), Russian politician
- Aarne Juutilainen (1904–1976), Finnish army captain, also known as nickname "The Terror of Morocco"
- Martti Kosma (1927–1999), former manager of the Finland national football team

== Twin towns and sister cities ==
- Joensuu, Finland
- Kitee, Finland
- Bogen, Germany
- Serdobsk, Russia

== See also ==
- Impilahti
- Vyborg
