= Sortavalsky District =

Municipal district in Karelia, Russia

Sortavalsky District Беломорский район (Russian)
- District

Other transcription(s)
  - Karelian: Sortavalskin piiri
- View of Lake Ladoga

- Flag Coat of arms
- Location of Sortavalsky District in the Republic of Karelia
- Coordinates: 64°31′N 34°46′E
- Country: Russia
- Federal subject: Republic of Karelia
- Established: 1 January 1970
- Administrative center: Sortavala

Area
  - Total: 2,189 km^{2} (845 sq mi)

Population (2010 Census)
  - Total: 32,287
  - Density: 14.75/km^{2} (38.20/sq mi)
  - Urban: 58.7%
  - Rural: 41.3%

Administrative structure
  - Inhabited localities: 1 cities/towns, 56 rural localities

Municipal structure
  - Municipally incorporated as: Sortavalsky Municipal District
  - Municipal divisions: 1 urban settlements, 3 rural settlements
- Time zone: UTC+3 (UTC+03:00)
- OKTMO ID: 86510000
- Website: https://sortavalsky.kar.sudrf.ru/

Population of Sortavalsky District
- 2010 Census: 32,287
- 2002 Census: 35,096
- 1989 Census: 38,004
- 1979 Census: 36,761

Sortavalsky District (Russian: Сортава́льский райо́н; Karelian: Sortavalskin piiri) is an administrative district (raion), one of the fifteen in the Republic of Karelia, Russia. It is located in the east of the republic. The area of the district is 2,189 square kilometers (845 sq mi). Its administrative center is the town of Sortavala. As of the 2010 Census, the total population of the district was 32,287, with the population of Sortavala accounting for 58.7% of that number.
